= List of the Damned members =

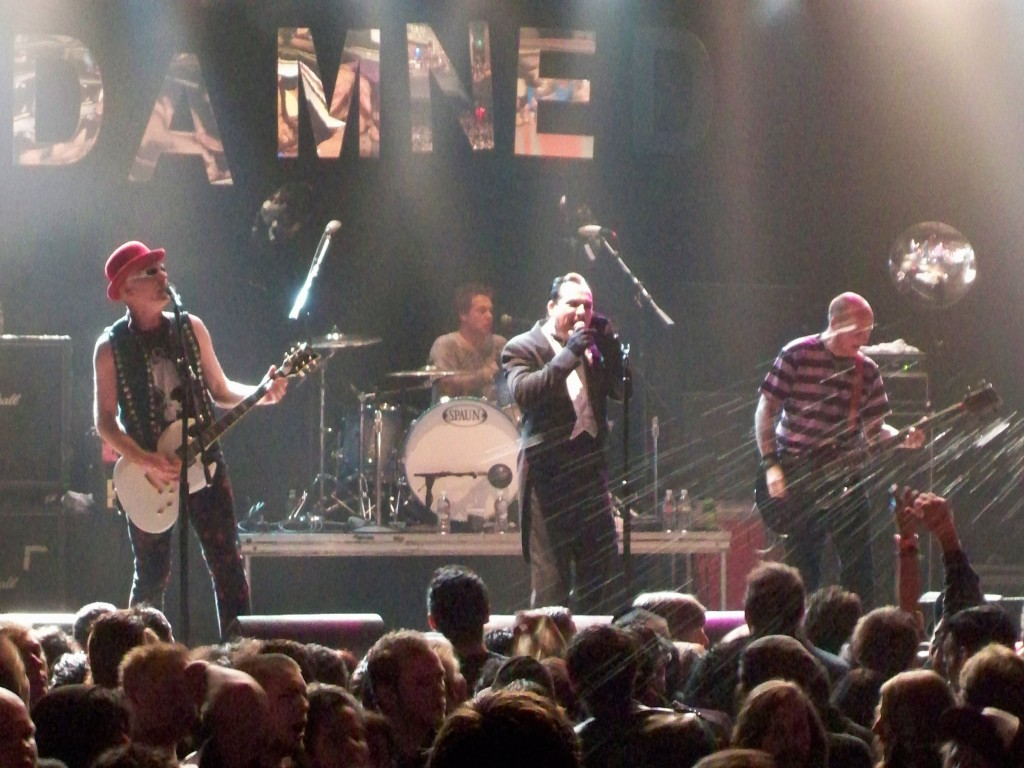
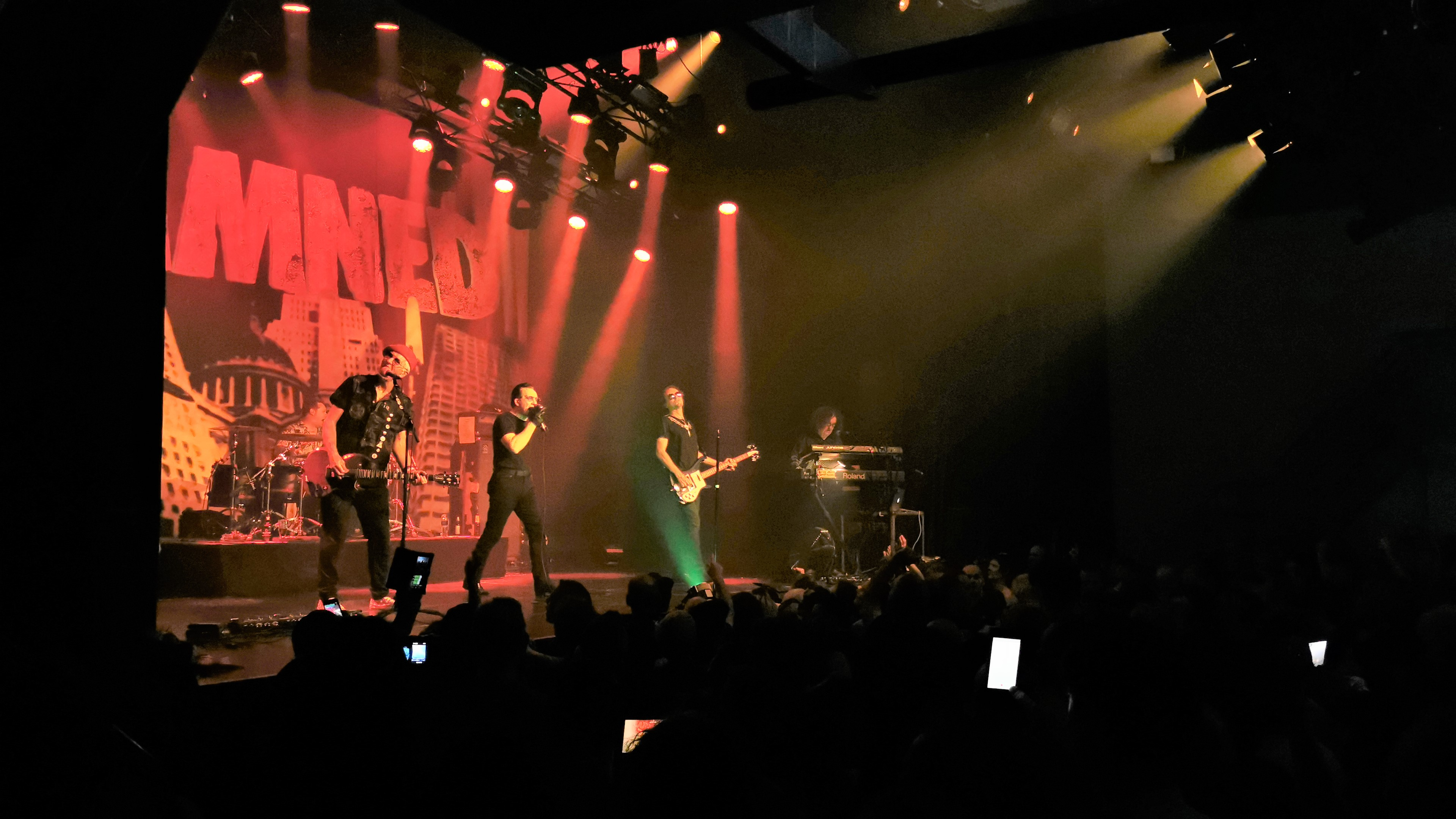
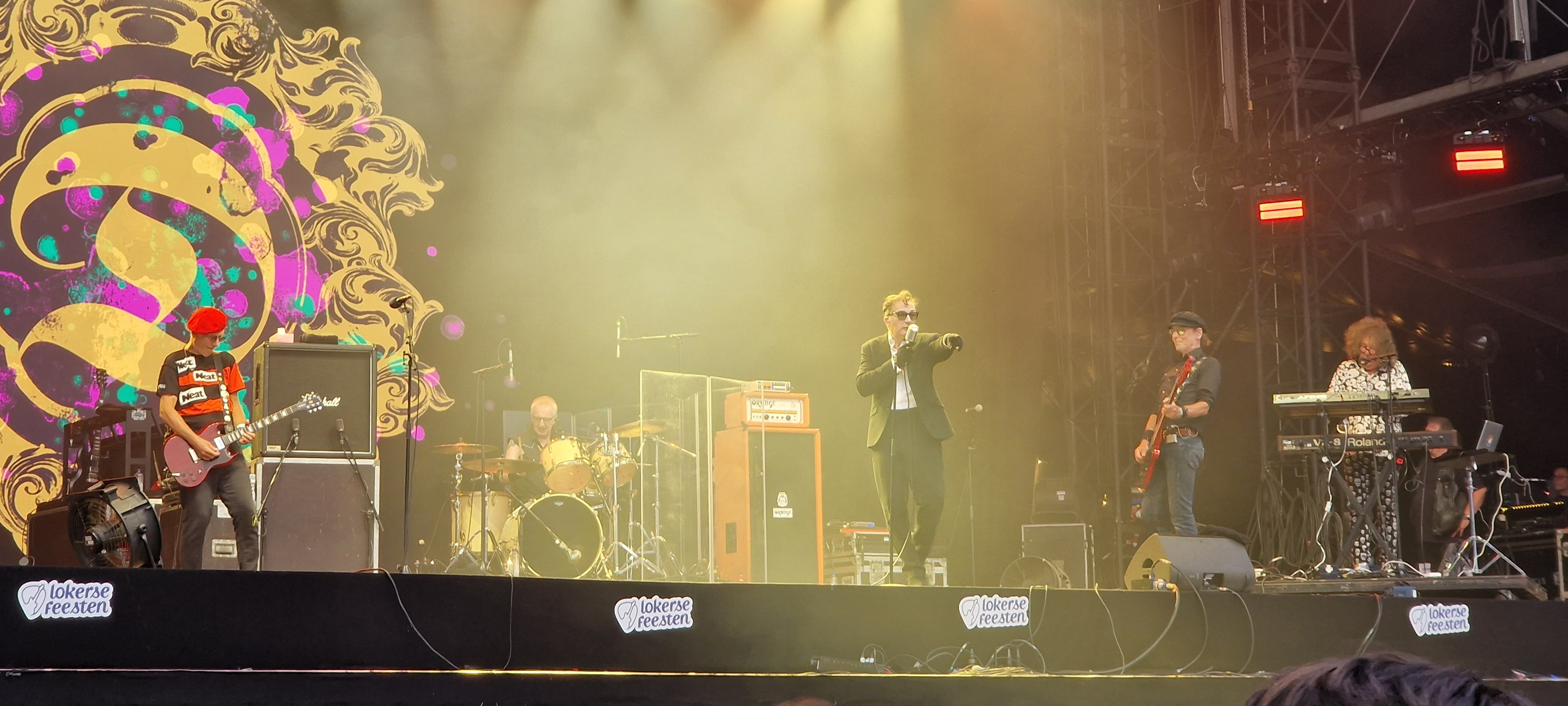
Three line-ups of the Damned performing live in 2008, 2019 and 2024

The Damned are an English punk rock band from London. Formed in June 1976, the group originally consisted of vocalist Dave Vanian, guitarist Brian James, bassist Raymond "Captain Sensible" Burns and drummer Christopher "Rat Scabies" Millar. The band's current lineup includes Vanian, Sensible (on guitar; from 1976 to 1984, 1988 to 1992, and since 1996), Millar (who left in 1996 and rejoined in 2023) bassist Paul Gray (from 1980 to 1983, 1989 to 1992, in 1996, and since 2017) and keyboardist Laurence "Monty Oxymoron" Burrow (since 1996).

== History ==
=== 1976–1989 ===
The Damned were formed by Dave Vanian, Brian James, Captain Sensible and Rat Scabies in June 1976. After the release of their debut album Damned Damned Damned, Robert "Lu" Edmonds was added as a second guitarist in August 1977. This lineup recorded Music for Pleasure, although Scabies had left the band by the time it was released. After a handful of shows with temporary substitute Dave Berk, the band replaced Scabies for a European tour the following month with Jon Moss. Music for Pleasure was a commercial failure, which led to the Damned being dropped by their label Stiff Records and breaking up in early 1978. In the following months, Vanian, Sensible (on guitar) and Scabies performed a handful of shows initially as Les Punks, with Motörhead frontman Lemmy filling in on bass at the Electric Ballroom, Camden on 5/9/1978, then as The Doomed with Henry Badowski.

In January 1979, the Damned officially reformed with Alasdair "Algy" Ward (formerly of Australian band the Saints) taking over the vacated bass role. Machine Gun Etiquette was issued later in the year, before Ward was replaced by Paul Gray in early 1980. After the release of The Black Album, the band added Paul Scott as their first live keyboardist. He was replaced in July 1981 by Pete Saunders, who subsequently made way for Roman Jugg in November, after Saunders's initially chosen replacement Tosh was unable to join. As a five-piece lineup for the first time, the group issued Friday 13th in 1981, Strawberries in 1982, and Live at Newcastle in 1983. In March 1983, however, Gray left to join UFO, with Bryn Merrick (a former bandmate of Jugg's in the group Victimize) taking his place.

Before a show on 24 August 1984, Captain Sensible left the Damned to focus on his solo career, with Jugg taking over as lead guitarist and Steve McGuire of Doctor and the Medics temporarily filling in on keyboards. The group subsequently continued as a four-piece, with the addition of Paul "Shirley" Shepley as touring keyboardist. After the release of Phantasmagoria and Anything, the Damned were dropped by MCA Records. The band continued performing live, before the original quartet reformed for part of a special show in June 1988 which was later issued as Final Damnation. Sensible and James continued to tour with the existing lineup (with Gray in place of Bryn), performing select songs at shows during 1989. After a final farewell tour in the UK and US, the group disbanded later in the year.

=== 1991 onward ===
The Damned's breakup was short-lived, however, as they embarked on a reunion tour just two years later. After a few shows into the September 1991 run, Brian James left the band suddenly following an argument with Captain Sensible and Rat Scabies, and the remaining members continued as a four-piece. The Damned essentially disbanded again after a short run of European shows in 1992, before Dave Vanian and Scabies introduced a new incarnation of the group in December 1993 featuring guitarists Kris Dollimore and Alan Lee Shaw, and bassist Jason "Moose" Harris. Shortly after the release of Not of This Earth in late 1995, Scabies left the Damned and Vanian reunited with Captain Sensible and his solo band – bassist Paul Gray, drummer Garrie Dreadful and keyboardist Monty Oxymoron.

Gray was replaced by Vanian's wife Patricia Morrison in time for a Japanese tour starting in September 1996, after he sustained an injury during a show. After three years of sustained touring, Dreadful was replaced in early 1999 by Spike Smith, who made way just a few months later for former English Dogs drummer Andrew "Pinch" Pinching. The group released their first studio album in six years, Grave Disorder, in 2001, before Morrison left the Damned after giving birth to daughter Emily on 9 February 2004. She was replaced by Stu West, a former bandmate of Pinch's in English Dogs. The addition of West began a long period of stability for the Damned, who released their tenth studio album So, Who's Paranoid? in 2008 and a series of live albums in subsequent years.

In September 2017, it was announced that Paul Gray had returned to the band for the upcoming album Evil Spirits and all future tour dates. Following the album's touring cycle, Pinch left in October 2019.

In early February 2022, The Damned announced their new drummer was Will Taylor and that they were working on a new studio album, set for release in late 2022. In early November 2023, Taylor announced on Facebook that his time with the Damned was over. Later that month the band announced that Rat Scabies had rejoined for festivals and tour dates in 2024.

== Members ==
=== Current ===
Image	Name	Years active	Instruments	Release contributions
	Dave Vanian (David Lett)	1976–present	lead vocals	all the Damned releases
	Captain Sensible (Raymond Burns)	1976–1984; 1988–1992; 1996–present	guitar (since 1979); backing and occasional lead vocals; bass (1976–78, 1988–1991, 2022); keyboards (1979–84)	all the Damned releases from Damned Damned Damned (1977) to "Thanks for the Night" (1984); The Peel Sessions (1986); The Captain's Birthday Party (1986); Not the Captain's Birthday Party? (1986); Mindless, Directionless Energy: Live at the Lyceum 1981 (1987); Final Damnation (1988); "Fun Factory" (1990); Ballroom Blitz: Live at the Lyceum (1992); The School Bullies (1993); Eternal Damnation Live (1999); all the Damned releases from Grave Disorder (2001) onward
	Rat Scabies (Christopher Millar)	1976–1977; 1979–1996; 2022; 2023–present	drums; backing vocals; occasional piano	all the Damned releases from Damned Damned Damned (1977) to "Fun Factory" (1990), and from Ballroom Blitz: Live at the Lyceum (1992) to Molten Lager (1999); Live at the 100 Club 6/7/76 (2007)
	Paul Gray	1980–1983; 1989–1992; 1996; 2017–present	bass; backing vocals	all the Damned releases from "White Rabbit" (1980) to Live at Newcastle (1983); Mindless, Directionless Energy: Live at the Lyceum 1981 (1987); "Fun Factory" (1990); Ballroom Blitz: Live at the Lyceum (1992); all the Damned released from Evil Spirits (2018) onward
	Monty Oxymoron (Laurence Burrow)	1996–present	keyboards; backing vocals	all the Damned releases from Grave Disorder (2001) onward, except Live at the 100 Club 6/7/76 (2007)

=== Former ===
Image	Name	Years active	Instruments	Release contributions
	Brian James (Brian Robertson)	1976–1978; 1988–1991; 2022; (died 2025)	guitar; backing vocals	Damned Damned Damned (1977); Music for Pleasure (1977); The Peel Sessions (1986); The Captain's Birthday Party (1986); Not the Captain's Birthday Party? (1986); Final Damnation (1988); "Prokofiev" (1991); Eternal Damnation Live (1999); Live at the 100 Club 6/7/76 (2007)
	Robert "Lu" Edmonds	1977–1978	guitar; backing vocals	Music For Pleasure (1977)
	Jon Moss	1977–1978	drums	none
	Alasdair "Algy" Ward	1978–1980 (died 2023)	bass; backing vocals	Machine Gun Etiquette (1979); Live '79 (1979); The School Bullies (1993)
	Roman Jugg	1982–1989 (session/touring 1981–1982)	guitar (lead from 1984); keyboards; backing and occasional lead vocals	Friday 13th (1981); Strawberries (1982); all the Damned releases from Live at Newcastle (1983) to "Eloise" (1986); Anything (1986); Final Damnation (1988); Fiendish Shadows (1997)
	Bryn Merrick	1983–1989; 1992 (died 2015)	bass; backing vocals	"Thanks for the Night" (1984); Phantasmagoria (1985); "Eloise" (1986); Anything (1986); Final Damnation (1988); Fiendish Shadows (1997)
	Jason "Moose" Harris	1993–1996	bass; backing vocals	Not of This Earth (1995); Testify (1997); Molten Lager (1999)
	Kris Dollimore	1993–1996	guitar; backing vocals	Not of This Earth (1995); Testify (1997); Molten Lager (1999)
	Alan Lee Shaw	1993–1996	guitar; backing vocals	Not of This Earth (1995); Testify (1997); Molten Lager (1999)
	Garrie Dreadful (Gary Priest)	1996–1999	drums	none
	Patricia Morrison (Patricia Rainone)	1996–2004	bass; backing vocals	Grave Disorder (2001); Tiki Nightmare: Live in London (2003)
	Spike Smith	1999	drums	none
	Andrew "Pinch" Pinching	1999–2019	drums; backing vocals	all the Damned releases from Grave Disorder (2001) to The Rockfield Files (2020), except Live at the 100 Club 6/7/76 (2007)
	Stu West	2004–2017	bass	all Damned releases from MGE25: Machine Gun Etiquette 25 Tour (2006) to 40th Anniversary Tour: Live in Margate (2017), except Live at the 100 Club 6/7/76 (2007)
	Will Taylor	2022–2023	drums	Darkadelic (2023)

=== Touring ===
Image	Name	Years active	Instruments	Details
	Dave Berk	1977	drums	Berk temporarily toured with the Damned after the departure of Rat Scabies, before the arrival of Jon Moss.
	Lemmy (Ian Kilmister)	1978 (died 2015)	bass	Motörhead frontman Lemmy performed bass at the Electric Ballroom on 5/9/1978 at which the band was dubbed "Les Punks", following their breakup. He would also perform on the band's cover of The Sweet's "Ballroom Blitz"
	Henry Badowski	1978	bass	Henry Badowski played from September to October 1978 during the period when the band was going under the name The Doomed.
	Gary Holton	1978 (died 1985)	lead vocals	Heavy Metal Kids singer Holton temporarily substituted for regular vocalist Dave Vanian during a tour of Scotland in December 1978.
	Paul "Astroturf" Scott	1980–1981	keyboards	Scott joined the Damned as their first live keyboardist in late 1980 for the tour in promotion of The Black Album.
	Pete Saunders	1981	keyboards	After Scott was unable to commit to future shows, he was replaced in the touring lineup by Saunders in July 1981.
	Tosh	1981	keyboards	A keyboardist called Tosh was initially recruited to take over from Saunders, however he was unable to join.
	Steve McGuire	1984	keyboards	After the departure of Captain Sensible, Roman Jugg switched to guitar and McGuire filled in on keyboards.
	Paul "Shirley" Shepley	1985–1989	keyboards	Shepley took over as live keyboardist after Captain Sensible's departure and Roman Jugg's switch to guitar.
	Warren Renfrow	2002	bass	Renfrow temporarily replaced Patricia Morrison for a tour in 2002, after she left to "deal with a family illness".
	Jon Priestley	2018	bass	Priestley temporarily replaced Paul Gray starting with the Vive Le Rock awards show and later tour dates.
	Dave Ruffy	2018	drums	Ruffy replaced Pinch, who was unavailable at the time, at the Vive Le Rock awards show on 28 March 2018.
	Troy Van Leeuwen	2022	guitar	Van Leeuwen replaced Captain Sensible, who was unavailable due to travel restrictions, on the band's North American tour in 2022.

== Lineups ==
Period	Members	Releases
June 1976 – August 1977	Dave Vanian – lead vocals; Brian James – guitar, backing vocals; Captain Sensible – bass, backing vocals; Rat Scabies – drums, backing vocals	Damned Damned Damned (1977); The Peel Sessions (1986); The Captain's Birthday Party (1986); Eternal Damnation Live (1999); Live at the 100 Club 6/7/76 (2007)
July – October 1977	Dave Vanian – lead vocals; Brian James – guitar, backing vocals; Lu Edmonds – guitar, backing vocals; Captain Sensible – bass, backing vocals; Rat Scabies – drums, backing vocals	Music for Pleasure (1977)
October – November 1977	Dave Vanian – lead vocals; Brian James – guitar, backing vocals; Lu Edmonds – guitar, backing vocals; Captain Sensible – bass, backing vocals; Dave Berk – drums (substitute)	none
November 1977 – April 1978	Dave Vanian – lead vocals; Brian James – guitar, backing vocals; Lu Edmonds – guitar, backing vocals; Captain Sensible – bass, backing vocals; Jon Moss – drums	none
Band inactive April – September 1978
5 September 1978 (as Les Punks)	Dave Vanian – lead vocals; Captain Sensible – guitar, backing vocals; Rat Scabies – drums, backing vocals; Lemmy – bass, backing vocals	
September – October 1978 (as The Doomed)	Dave Vanian – lead vocals; Captain Sensible – guitar, backing vocals; Rat Scabies – drums, backing vocals; Henry Badowski – bass, backing vocals	
November 1978 – February 1980 (as The Doomed until December 1978)	Dave Vanian – lead vocals; Captain Sensible – guitar, keyboards, backing vocals; Rat Scabies – drums, backing vocals; Algy Ward – bass, backing vocals	Machine Gun Etiquette (1979); Live '79 (1979); The School Bullies (1993)
February 1980 – November 1981	Dave Vanian – lead vocals; Captain Sensible – guitar, keyboards, backing vocals; Paul Gray – bass, backing vocals; Rat Scabies – drums, backing vocals	"White Rabbit" (1980); The Black Album (1980); "There Ain't No Sanity Clause" (1980); Live Shepperton 1980 (1982); Mindless, Directionless Energy: Live at the Lyceum 1981 (1987); Ballroom Blitz: Live at the Lyceum (1992)
November 1981 – March 1983	Dave Vanian – lead vocals; Captain Sensible – guitar, keyboards, backing vocals; Paul Gray – bass, backing vocals; Rat Scabies – drums, backing vocals; Roman Jugg – keyboards, guitar, backing vocals	Friday 13th (1981); Strawberries (1982); Live at Newcastle (1983); "Fun Factory" (1990)
March 1983 – August 1984	Dave Vanian – lead vocals; Captain Sensible – guitar, backing vocals; Bryn Merrick – bass, backing vocals; Rat Scabies – drums, backing vocals; Roman Jugg – keyboards, guitar, backing vocals	"Thanks for the Night" (1984)
August 1984 – May 1988	Dave Vanian – lead vocals; Roman Jugg – guitar, keyboards, backing vocals; Bryn Merrick – bass, backing vocals; Rat Scabies – drums, backing vocals	Phantasmagoria (1985); Anything (1986); "Eloise" (1986); Fiendish Shadows (1997)
May 1988 – June 1989	Dave Vanian – lead vocals; Captain Sensible – guitar, bass, backing vocals; Bryn Merrick – bass, backing vocals (select songs); Rat Scabies – drums, backing vocals; Roman Jugg – keyboards, backing vocals (select songs); Brian James – guitar, backing vocals (select songs)	Final Damnation (1989)
June – December 1989	Dave Vanian – lead vocals; Captain Sensible – guitar, bass, backing vocals; Rat Scabies – drums, backing vocals; Brian James – guitar, backing vocals (select songs); Paul Gray – bass, backing vocals (select songs)	none
Band inactive December 1989 – September 1991
September 1991	Dave Vanian – lead vocals; Captain Sensible – guitar, bass, backing vocals; Rat Scabies – drums, backing vocals; Brian James – guitar, backing vocals (select songs); Paul Gray – bass, backing vocals (select songs)	"Prokofiev" (1991) (Vanian and James only)
September 1991 – June 1992	Dave Vanian – lead vocals; Captain Sensible – guitar, backing vocals; Paul Gray – bass, backing vocals; Rat Scabies – drums, backing vocals	none
June – July 1992	Dave Vanian – lead vocals; Captain Sensible – guitar, backing vocals; Bryn Merrick – bass, backing vocals; Rat Scabies – drums, backing vocals	none
Band inactive July 1992 – December 1993
December 1993 – January 1996	Dave Vanian – lead vocals; Kris Dollimore – guitar, backing vocals; Alan Lee Shaw – guitar, backing vocals; Moose Harris – bass, backing vocals; Rat Scabies – drums	Not of This Earth (1995); Testify (1997); Molten Lager (1999)
February – September 1996	Dave Vanian – lead vocals; Captain Sensible – guitar, backing vocals; Paul Gray – bass, backing vocals; Garrie Dreadful – drums; Monty Oxymoron – keyboards, backing vocals	none
September 1996 – March 1999	Dave Vanian – lead vocals; Captain Sensible – guitar, backing vocals; Patricia Morrison – bass, backing vocals; Garrie Dreadful – drums; Monty Oxymoron – keyboards, backing vocals	none
March – August 1999	Dave Vanian – lead vocals; Captain Sensible – guitar, backing vocals; Patricia Morrison – bass, backing vocals; Spike Smith – drums; Monty Oxymoron – keyboards, backing vocals	none
September 1999 – February 2004	Dave Vanian – lead vocals; Captain Sensible – guitar, backing vocals; Patricia Morrison – bass, backing vocals; Pinch – drums, backing vocals; Monty Oxymoron – keyboards, backing vocals	Grave Disorder (2001); Tiki Nightmare: Live in London (2003)
February 2004 – September 2017	Dave Vanian – lead vocals; Captain Sensible – guitar, backing vocals; Stu West – bass; Pinch – drums, backing vocals; Monty Oxymoron – keyboards, backing vocals	MGE25: Machine Gun Etiquette 25 Tour (2006); Return to the 100 Club (2007); So, Who's Paranoid? (2008); 35th Anniversary Live In Concert (2012); Another Live Album from the Damned (2014); 35 Years of Anarchy, Chaos and Destruction: 35th Anniversary – Live in London (2016); 40th Anniversary Tour: Live in Margate (2016)
September 2017 – October 2019	Dave Vanian – lead vocals; Captain Sensible – guitar, backing vocals; Paul Gray – bass, backing vocals; Pinch – drums, backing vocals; Monty Oxymoron – keyboards, backing vocals	Evil Spirits (2018)
February 2022 – November 2023	Dave Vanian – lead vocals; Captain Sensible – guitar, backing vocals; Paul Gray – bass, backing vocals; Monty Oxymoron – keyboards, backing vocals; Will Taylor – drums	Darkadelic (2023)
October – November 2022 (Live 'original line-up' reunion shows)	Dave Vanian – lead vocals; Brian James – guitar, backing vocals; Captain Sensible – bass, backing vocals; Rat Scabies – drums, backing vocals	The Damned A.D. 2022 (2023)
November 2023 – present	Dave Vanian – lead vocals; Captain Sensible – guitar, backing vocals; Paul Gray – bass, backing vocals; Monty Oxymoron – keyboards, backing vocals; Rat Scabies – drums	Not Like Everybody Else (2026)

== Bibliography ==
- Hutchinson, Barry (22 July 2017a), After the Lights Go Out: A Biography of the Phantom Chords, Lulu.com, ISBN 978-0244321048
- Hutchinson, Barry (22 July 2017b), The Damned: The Chaos Years – An Unofficial Biography, Lulu.com, ISBN 978-0244921552
