= The Damned discography =

Band discography

- Studio albums: 13
- Extended plays: 5
- Live albums: 22
- Compilation albums: 28
- Singles: 48
- Video albums: 7
- Music videos: 17
- Box sets: 4

The discography of British punk rock band the Damned includes thirteen studio albums, twenty-two live albums, twenty-eight compilations, four box sets, five extended plays and forty-eight singles.

== Albums ==
=== Studio albums ===
Title	Album details	Peak chart positions				Certifications (sales thresholds)
Title	Album details	UK	UK Indie	AUS	NZ	Certifications (sales thresholds)
Damned Damned Damned	Released: 18 February 1977; Label: Stiff; Formats: LP, MC	34	—	—	—	
Music for Pleasure	Released: 18 November 1977; Label: Stiff; Formats: LP, MC	—	—	—	—	
Machine Gun Etiquette	Released: 9 November 1979; Label: Chiswick; Formats: LP, MC	31	4	—	—	UK: Silver
The Black Album	Released: October 1980; Label: Chiswick; Formats: 2×LP, LP, MC	29	13	—	—	
Strawberries	Released: 1 October 1982; Label: Bronze; Formats: LP, MC	15	7	—	—	
Phantasmagoria	Released: 15 July 1985; Label: MCA; Formats: CD, LP, MC	11	—	95	32	UK: Silver
Anything	Released: 1 December 1986; Label: MCA; Formats: CD, LP, MC	40	—	—	—	UK: Silver
Not of This Earth	Released: 8 November 1995; Label: InsideOut, Cleopatra, Marble Orchard; Formats: CD, LP, MC; Released in the UK in April 1996 as I'm Alright Jack and the Bean Stalk	—	—	—	—	
Grave Disorder	Released: 21 August 2001; Label: Nitro; Formats: CD, LP	—	38	—	—	
So, Who's Paranoid?	Release date: 17 November 2008; Label: The English Channel; Formats: CD	—	32	—	—	
Evil Spirits	Release date: 13 April 2018; Label: Spinefarm/Search and Destroy; Formats: CD, LP, digital download	7	—	—	—	
Darkadelic	Release date: 28 April 2023; Label: earMUSIC; Formats: CD, LP, digital download	9	—	—	—	
Not Like Everybody Else	Release date: 23 January 2026; Label: earMUSIC; Formats: CD, LP, digital download	23	—	—	—	
"—" denotes releases that did not chart or were not released in that territory.

=== Live albums ===
Title	Album details	Peak chart positions
Title	Album details	UK Indie
Live Shepperton 1980	Released: 26 November 1982; Label: Big Beat; Formats: LP	5
Live in Newcastle	Released: November 1983; Label: Damned; Formats: LP	2
The Captain's Birthday Party	Released: 27 June 1986; Label: Stiff; Formats: LP	—
Not the Captain's Birthday Party?	Released: 17 October 1986; Label: Demon; Formats: LP; Reissue of The Captain's Birthday Party with an additional track	16
Mindless Directionless Energy	Released: 30 October 1987; Label: I.D.; Formats: CD, LP, MC	—
Final Damnation	Released: 28 August 1989; Label: Essential; Formats: CD, LP, MC	—
Live	Released: 1991; Label: Success/Marble Arch Rock; Formats: 3×CD, digital download	—
Ballroom Blitz – Live at the Lyceum	Released: 15 June 1992; Label: Receiver; Formats: CD, LP	—
The School Bullies	Released: 3 May 1993; Label: Receiver; Formats: CD	—
Fiendish Shadows	Released: September 1996; Label: Cleopatra; Formats: CD; US and Japan-only release	—
Eternal Damnation Live	Released: June 1999; Label: Big Ear Music; Formats: CD; US-only release	—
Molten Lager	Released: October 1999; Label: Musical Tragedies, Sudden Death; Formats: CD; Germany and Canada-only release	—
Tiki Nightmare – Live in London	Released: November 2003; Label: Salvo; Formats: 2×CD+DVD	—
Live at the 100 Club	Released: April 2007 (LP); Label: Castle Music; Formats: CD (only with expanded release of debut album), LP (limited release)	—
Return to the 100 Club	Released: 2007; Label: Live Here Now; Formats: 2×CD (limited release)	—
Live at Woolwich Coronet	Released: 27 August 2007; Label: Cleopatra; Formats: LP; US-only limited release	—
Machine Gun Etiquette Anniversary Live Set	Released: 13 June 2011; Label: Easy Action; Formats: CD+2×DVD	—
35th Anniversary Live in Concert – 12.11.2011 The Roundhouse, London	Released: 12 November 2011; Label: Concert Live, 4W; Formats: 2×CD	—
35th Anniversary Live in Concert – 19.11.2011 Academy Manchester	Released: 2012; Label: Concert Live; Formats: 2×CD	—
Another Live Album from the Damned	Released: 27 October 2014; Label: Southworld, 4W; Formats: 2×CD, 2×LP, digital download	—
35 Years of Anarchy, Chaos and Destruction – 35th Anniversary – Live in London	Released: 18 September 2015; Label: Westworld; Formats: 2×CD	—
40th Anniversary Tour – Live in Margate	Released: December 2016; Label: Live Here Now; Formats: 2×CD, 3×LP	—
A Night of a Thousand Vampires: Live in London	Released: 28 October 2022; Label: Earmusic; Formats: 2×CD+Blu-ray, 2×LP	—
"—" denotes releases that did not chart or were not released in that territory.

=== Compilation albums ===
Title	Album details	Peak chart positions		
Title	Album details	UK	UK Indie	NZ
Another Great Record from the Damned – The Best of the Damned	Released: 13 November 1981; Label: Ace; Formats: LP, MC	43	3	41
Damned But Not Forgotten	Released: January 1986; Label: Dojo; Formats: CD, LP, MC	—	2	—
Lively Arts	Released: 21 February 1986; Label: PRT/Big Beat; Formats: LP; Japan-only release	—	—	—
The Light at the End of the Tunnel	Released: 30 November 1987; Label: MCA; Formats: 2×CD, 2×LP, 2×MC	87	—	—
Best of Vol 1 1/2 – Long Lost Weekend	Released: 31 May 1988; Label: Big Beat; Formats: LP, MC	—	17	—
Chiswick Singles	Released: 21 February 1990; Label: Chiswick; Formats: CD; Japan-only release	—	—	—
The Collection	Released: 10 December 1990; Label: Castle Communications; Formats: CD, 2×LP, MC	—	—	—
Totally Damned	Released: 1991; Label: Dojo Limited; Formats: CD	—	—	—
The MCA Singles A+Bs	Released: July 1992; Label: Connoisseur Collection; Formats: CD, MC	—	—	—
Skip Off School to See the Damned	Released: 28 September 1992; Label: Demon; Formats: CD	—	—	—
Tales from the Damned	Released: 13 August 1993; Label: Cleopatra; Formats: CD, MC; US-only release	—	—	—
Sessions of the Damned	Released: 15 November 1993; Label: Strange Fruit; Formats: CD	—	—	—
Eternally Damned: The Very Best of the Damned	Released: 30 May 1994; Label: Music Collection; Formats: CD, MC	—	—	—
Noise – The Best of the Damned Live	Released: 11 September 1995; Label: Emporio; Formats: CD, MC	—	—	—
From The Beginning	Released: 1995; Label: Spectrum Music (Universal Special Operations); Formats: CD; Country: Germany	—	—	—
The Radio One Sessions	Released: April 1996; Label: Nighttracks; Formats: CD	—	—	—
The Chaos Years – Rare & Unreleased 1977–1982	Released: 5 March 1997; Label: Cleopatra; Formats: CD; US-only release	—	—	—
Born to Kill	Released: May 1997; Label: Recall 2cd; Formats: 2×CD	—	—	—
The Best of the Damned – Marvellous	Released: 29 November 1999; Label: Big Beat; Formats: CD	—	—	—
The Pleasure and the Pain – Selected Highlights 1982–1991	Released: June 2000; Label: Castle Music; Formats: 2×CD	—	—	—
Live Anthology	Released: 22 October 2001; Label: Castle Music; Formats: 2×CD	—	—	—
Smash It Up: The Anthology 1976–1987	Released: 22 October 2002; Label: Castle Music/Sanctuary; Formats: 2×CD	154	—	—
Punk Generation: Best of Oddities & Versions	Released: 17 February 2004; Label: Anarchy Music; Formats: CD, digital download	—	—	—
Neat Neat Neat – The Alternative Anthology	Released: 11 October 2004; Label: Sanctuary Midline; Formats: 3×CD	—	—	—
The Best of the Damned – Total Damnation	Released: April 2006; Label: Metro; Formats: CD	—	—	—
Chiswick Singles...and Another Thing	Released: 26 September 2011; Label: Chiswick; Formats: CD; Includes Friday 13th EP	—	—	—
Punk Oddities & Rare Tracks 1977–1982	Released: 14 March 2014; Label: Cleopatra; Formats: CD, LP	—	—	—
Go! – 45	Released: 25 May 2015; Label: Chiswick; Formats: LP	—	—	—
Black Is the Night: The Definitive Anthology	Released: 1 November 2019; Label: BMG; Formats: 2×CD, 4×LP, digital download	63	—	—
Singles Singles Singles Vol.1 – 1976/1979	Released: 19 November 2021; Label: Zero Thoughts; Formats: LP	—	—	—
"—" denotes releases that did not chart or were not released in that territory.

==== Compilation appearances ====
- The Moonlight Tapes (1980)
- The Whip (1983)
- The Return of the Living Dead (1985)
- The History Of Rock Volume 31 (1985)
- Live At Alice In Wonderland - A Pretty Smart Way To Catch A Lobster (1986)
- The Punk Incident (1994)
- The Best Punk Album In The World...Ever! (1995)
- Punk Rock Xmas (1995)
- Punk - Lost & Found (1996)
- The Chiswick Story: Adventures Of An Independent Record Label 1975-1982 (1996)
- Industrial Mix Machine (1997)
- Short Music For Short People (1999)
- Punkzilla (2001)
- Warped Tour - 2002 Compilation (2002)
- No Thanks! The '70s Punk Rebellion (2003)
- Friends Reunited.co.uk The Class Of 1986 (2004)
- Friends Reunited.co.uk The Class Of 1987 (2004)
- Hardcore Breakout USA 1,2,3,... (2004)
- Ace 30th Birthday Celebration - Garage, Beat and Punk Rock (2005)
- The Satanic Rights Of Dracula (2006)
- Hardcore Breakout – Essential Punk (2012)

=== Box sets ===
Title	Album details
Boxed	Released: 18 May 1999; Label: Cleopatra; Formats: 3×CD; US-only release
The Stiff Singles 1976–1977	Released: February 2003; Label: Castle Music; Formats: 5×CD
Play It at Your Sister	Released: 24 October 2005; Label: Castle Music; Formats: 3×CD
Noise Noise Noise – The Live Box	Released: 4 September 2006; Label: Castle Music/Sanctuary; Formats: 5×CD

== Extended plays ==
Title	Album details	Peak chart positions	
Title	Album details	UK	UK Indie
Friday 13th EP	Released: 13 November 1981; Label: NEMS; Formats: 7", 12"	50	2
The Peel Sessions (10th May 1977)	Released: September 1986; Label: Strange Fruit; Formats: 12"	90	5
The Peel Sessions (30th November 1976)	Released: 20 November 1987; Label: Strange Fruit; Formats: 12"	—	26
Testify	Released: 21 January 1997; Label: Cleopatra; Formats: CD; US-only mini-album	—	—
The Rockfield Files	Released: 16 October 2020; Label: Spinefarm/Search and Destroy; Formats: CD, 12"	—	—
"—" denotes releases that did not chart or were not released in that territory.

== Singles ==
Title	Year	Peak chart positions							Album
Title	Year	UK	UK Indie	AUS	GER	IRE	NZ	US Main.	Album
"New Rose"	1976	—	—	—	—	—	—	—	Damned Damned Damned
"Neat Neat Neat"	1977	52 (Note: Chart position is from the "Star Breakers" list, an official extension of the BRMB Top 50 Singles Chart.)	—	—	—	—	—	—	Damned Damned Damned
"Stretcher Case Baby" (limited release)	1977	—	—	—	—	—	—	—	Music for Pleasure
"Problem Child"	1977	—	—	—	—	—	—	—	Music for Pleasure
"Don't Cry Wolf"	1977	—	—	—	—	—	—	—	Music for Pleasure
"Love Song"	1979	20	—	—	—	—	—	—	Machine Gun Etiquette
"Smash It Up"	1979	35	—	—	—	—	—	—	Machine Gun Etiquette
"I Just Can't Be Happy Today"	1979	46	—	—	—	—	—	—	Machine Gun Etiquette
"White Rabbit" (France and Germany-only release)	1980	—	—	—	—	—	—	—	Non-album single
"The History of the World (Part 1)"	1980	51	36	—	—	—	—	—	The Black Album
"Wait for the Blackout" (Spain-only release)	1980	—	—	—	—	—	—	—	The Black Album
"There Ain't No Sanity Clause"	1980	—	—	—	—	—	—	—	Non-album single
"Dr Jekyll & Mr Hyde" (US-only release)	1981	—	—	—	—	—	—	—	The Black Album
"Love Song" (reissue)	1982	—	3	—	—	—	—	—	Machine Gun Etiquette
"Smash It Up" (reissue)	1982	—	4	—	—	—	—	—	Machine Gun Etiquette
"Wait for the Blackout" (UK release)	1982	—	3	—	—	—	—	—	The Black Album
"Lovely Money"	1982	42	—	—	—	—	—	—	Non-album single
"Dozen Girls"	1982	—	—	—	—	—	—	—	Strawberries
"Lively Arts"	1982	—	5	—	—	—	—	—	The Black Album
"Generals"	1982	—	—	—	—	—	—	—	Strawberries
"White Rabbit" (UK release)	1983	82	2	—	—	—	—	—	Non-album singles
"There Ain't No Sanity Clause" (reissue)	1983	97	16	—	—	—	—	—	Non-album singles
"Thanks for the Night"	1984	43	1	—	—	—	—	—	Non-album singles
"Grimly Fiendish"	1985	21	—	—	—	—	—	—	Phantasmagoria
"The Shadow of Love"	1985	25	—	—	—	—	—	—	Phantasmagoria
"Is It a Dream?"	1985	34	—	69	—	—	—	—	Phantasmagoria
"Eloise"	1986	3	—	8	58	4	18	—	Non-album singles
"New Rose" (reissue)	1986	81	—	—	—	—	—	—	Non-album singles
"Anything"	1986	32	—	—	—	—	—	—	Anything
"Gigolo"	1987	29	—	—	—	—	—	—	Anything
"Alone Again Or"	1987	27	—	—	—	—	—	50	Anything
"In Dulce Decorum"	1987	72	—	—	—	—	—	—	Anything
"Fun Factory" (Note: Originally recorded in 1983)	1991	—	—	—	—	—	—	—	Non-album singles
"Prokofiev"	1991	—	—	—	—	—	—	—	Non-album singles
"Shut It"	1996	—	—	—	—	—	—	—	Not of This Earth
"Disco Man" (Germany and Canada-only release)	1998	—	—	—	—	—	—	—	Non-album single
"Ignite" (US-only release)	2001	—	—	—	—	—	—	—	Strawberries
"Smash It Up" (2nd reissue)	2004	77	23	—	—	—	—	—	Machine Gun Etiquette
"Little Miss Disaster"	2005	—	—	—	—	—	—	—	So, Who's Paranoid?
"A Nation Fit for Heroes"	2010	—	—	—	—	—	—	—	So, Who's Paranoid?
"Standing on the Edge of Tomorrow"	2018	—	—	—	—	—	—	—	Evil Spirits
"Devil in Disguise"	2018	—	—	—	—	—	—	—	Evil Spirits
"Look Left"	2018	—	—	—	—	—	—	—	Evil Spirits
"Black Is the Night"	2019	—	—	—	—	—	—	—	Black Is the Night: The Definitive Anthology
"Keep 'Em Alive"	2020	— (Note: "Keep 'Em Alive" didn't enter the UK Singles Chart, but did peak at number 1 on the Vinyl Singles Chart and number 20 on the Rock & Metal Singles Chart.)	—	—	—	—	—	—	The Rockfield Files
"The Invisible Man"	2023	—	—	—	—	—	—	—	Darkadelic
"Beware of the Clown"	2023	—	—	—	—	—	—	—	Darkadelic
"You're Gonna Realise"	2023	—	—	—	—	—	—	—	Darkadelic
"—" denotes releases that did not chart or were not released in that territory.

== Videos ==
=== Video albums ===
Title	Album details
Live '79	Released: 1979; Label: Target Video; Formats: VHS, Betamax; US-only release
The Light at the End of the Tunnel	Released: 1987; Label: CIC Video; Formats: VHS
Final Damnation	Released: January 1989; Label: Virgin Music Video; Formats: VHS
Tiki Nightmare – Live in London	Released: 25 August 2003; Label: Union Square Pictures; Formats: DVD
MGE25 – Machine Gun Etiquette 25 Tour	Released: 20 February 2006; Label: ILC Entertainment; Formats: 2×DVD
Don't You Wish That We Were Dead	Released: 20 May 2016; Label: MVD Visual/Cleopatra; Formats: Blu-ray+DVD; US-only release
Really Must Be Going Now	Released: 2017; Label: Up Periscope; Formats: DVD

=== Music videos ===
Title	Year
"New Rose"	1976
"Smash It Up"	1979
"Plan 9 Channel 7"	1979
"Grimly Fiendish"	1985
"Shadow of Love"	1985
"Is It a Dream?"	1985
"Eloise"	1986
"Anything"	1986
"Gigolo"	1987
"Alone Again Or"	1987
"Standing on the Edge of Tomorrow"	2018
"Look Out"	2018
"Keep 'Em Alive"	2020
"The Invisible Man"	2023
"Beware of the Clown"	2023
"You're Gonna Realise"	2023
"There's a Ghost in My House"	2025
