= Little Miss Disaster =

Single by The Damned

from the album So, Who's Paranoid?
- A-side: "Little Miss Disaster"
- B-side: "Anti-Pope (Live)"
- Released: 1 December 2005
- Recorded: Chapel Studios, South Thoresby, 2005
- Length: 4:47
- Label: Lively Arts Records
- Songwriter(s): Captain Sensible, Louisa Carr
- Producer(s): The Damned

The Damned singles chronology
| "Shut It" (1996) | "Little Miss Disaster" (2005) | "A Nation Fit for Heroes" (2010) |

"Little Miss Disaster" is a song by punk rock band the Damned, released 1 December 2005 on their own Lively Arts label. It was the band's first single release since "Shut It" in 1996.

The band's lineup shifted again, with Stu West making his recording debut on bass guitar for the group, having taken over on live dates from Patricia Morrison, who had begun to concentrate on her daughter Emily and managing the band.

The song continued the style the band established for their Grave Disorder album, with their unique gothic/punk/psychedelic sound, fast guitars and swirling keyboards topped off with a dramatic vocal.

From 11 November 2005, the band began selling copies of the single on their Little Miss Disaster Tour. The sleeve featured Emily Strange as a result of a collaboration between the band and the Emily Strange website. On 1 December, the single was made available via the band's website, with a limited edition of 1,000 vinyl copies (with a red-splattered vinyl pattern), and on CD. The B-side, a live version of "Anti-Pope", was taken from the DVD MGE25, recorded live at Manchester Academy on 4 December 2004 to celebrate the 25th anniversary of their album Machine Gun Etiquette.

== Track listing ==
7” version: -

1. "Little Miss Disaster" (Sensible, Carr) – 4:47
2. "Anti-Pope (Live)" (Scabies, Sensible, Vanian, Ward) – 3:31

CD version: -

1. "Little Miss Disaster" (Sensible, Carr) – 4:47
2. "Anti-Pope (Live)" (Scabies, Sensible, Vanian, Ward) – 3:31
3. "The History of the World (Part 1)" (Scabies, Sensible, Vanian, Gray) (video track, taken from the MGE25 DVD)

== Production credits ==
- Producers:
  - The Damned ("Little Miss Disaster")
  - Dash Productions Ltd. (live tracks)
- Musicians:
  - Dave Vanian − vocals
  - Captain Sensible − guitar
  - Stu West − bass
  - Monty Oxymoron − keyboards
  - Pinch − drums
