= Molten Lager =

Live album by the Damned
- Released: October 1999
- Recorded: 23 June 1994
- Genres: Punk; rock
- Label: Musical Tragedies

The Damned chronology
| Eternal Damnation Live (1999) | Molten Lager (1999) | Grave Disorder (2001) |

Molten Lager is a live album by English rock band the Damned, released in October 1999. It was recorded in Mulhouse, France on 23 June 1994.

The line-up features the Not of This Earth personnel and showcases much of that album and other rare tracks by the Damned. It was recorded straight from the mixing desk to DAT.

== Reception ==
Professional ratings
Review scores
| Source | Rating |
|---|---|
| AllMusic | 2/5 stars |
| Kerrang! | 1/5 stars |

Jack Rabid, writing for AllMusic, called the album "extremely great-sounding," adding, "Being boogie-rock, it doesn't really sound like the Damned, but it sounds like a fairly kick-ass R&B punk band being fronted by Dave Vanian." However, he felt that the "few old classics this lineup attempts" sound "horrible."

== Track listing ==
| No. | Title | Writer(s) | Length |
|---|---|---|---|
| 1. | "Testify" | Alan Lee Shaw, Rat Scabies | 3:52 |
| 2. | "Shut It" | Shaw, Scabies | 2:47 |
| 3. | "Shadow to Fall" | Shaw, Scabies | 3:47 |
| 4. | "I Need a Life" | Shaw, Scabies | 3:11 |
| 5. | "I Walk the Line" | Johnny Cash | 2:35 |
| 6. | "Running Man" | Shaw, Scabies | 4:05 |
| 7. | "That Loving Feeling" | Phil Spector, Barry Mann, Cynthia Weil | 1:21 |
| 8. | "Not of This Earth" | Shaw, Scabies | 2:54 |
| 9. | "Heaven... Can Take Your Lies"" | Shaw, Scabies | 4:13 |
| 10. | "My Desire" | Shaw, Scabies | 2:50 |
| 11. | "Never Could Believe" | Shaw, Scabies | 4:40 |
| 12. | "Love Song" | Scabies, Captain Sensible, Dave Vanian, Algy Ward | 2:13 |
| 13. | "Disco Man" | Scabies, Sensible, Vanian, Paul Gray | 2:46 |
| 14. | "Neat Neat Neat" | Brian James | 2:20 |
| 15. | "Ignite" | Scabies, Sensible, Vanian, Gray | 3:49 |
| 16. | "Gun Fury" | Scabies, Sensible, Vanian, Gray | 3:02 |
| 17. | "I Must Be Mad" | The Damned | 0:26 |
| 18. | "Nasty" | Sensible, Scabies, Vanian, Roman Jugg, Bryn Merrick | 2:38 |

Note

- Some editions of the album omit "I Walk the Line" and "That Loving Feeling".

== Personnel ==
The Damned

- Dave Vanian – vocals
- Kris Dollimore – guitar
- Alan Lee Shaw – guitar, backing vocals
- Rat Scabies – drums
- Moose – bass

Technical

- Ralf Lexis – cover, artwork
