= Not the Captain's Birthday Party? =

Not The Captain's Birthday Party?

Live album by The Damned
- Released: July 1986
- Recorded: 27 November 1977
- Genre: Punk rock
- Label: Demon Music Group

Not The Captain's Birthday Party? is an album released in July 1986 by The Damned. The album is based on a live performance recorded by Engineer Tony Taverner, using La Maison Rouge mobile, on 27 November 1977 at the Roundhouse.

Essentially, the album is a swift re-issue of The Captain's Birthday Party release with the addition of "I'm Bored" on the LP and "I Fall" on the CD.

== Track listing ==
- All songs written by Brian James, except where noted.

Side one

1. "You Take my Money" – 2:20
2. "Creep (you can't Fool me)" – 2:10
3. "Fan Club" – 2:46
4. "Problem Child" – 2:14 ~ (Scabies, James)
5. "I'm Bored" – ?:?? ~ (Vanian, Burns, Rat Scabies)

Side two

1. "So Messed Up" – 1:57
2. "New Rose" – 2:17
3. "I Feel Alright" – 4:32 ~ (Dave Alexander, Ron Asheton, Scott Asheton, Iggy Pop)
4. "Born to Kill" – 2:46

(CD)

1. "You Take my Money" – 2:20
2. "Creep (you can't Fool me)" – 2:10
3. "Fan Club" – 2:46
4. "Problem Child" – 2:14 ~ (Scabies, James)
5. "I Fall" – 2:14
6. "So Messed Up" – 1:57
7. "New Rose" – 2:17
8. "I Feel Alright" – 4:32 ~ (Dave Alexander, Ron Asheton, Scott Asheton, Iggy Pop)
9. "Born to Kill" – 2:46

== Personnel ==
- Bass – Captain Sensible
- Design – Pete Maclin
- Drums – Rat Scabies
- Engineer – Tony Taverner
- Guitar – Brian James
- Photography – Keith Morris
- Vocals – Dave Vanian
