= The Damned: Don't You Wish That We Were Dead =

2015 film

- Directed by: Wes Orshoski
- Written by: Wes Orshoski
- Produced by: Wes Orshoski
- Starring: David Vanian; Captain Sensible; Rat Scabies; Brian James
- Cinematography: Wes Orshoski
- Edited by: Wes Orshoski
- Music by: The Damned
- Production company: Three Count Films
- Release date: March 19, 2015 (SXSW Film Festival)
- Running time: 110 minutes
- Country: United States
- Language: English

The Damned: Don't You Wish That We Were Dead is a 2015 American documentary film about the British rock band The Damned. It was directed by Wes Orshoski and premiered at the SXSW Film Festival.

== Summary ==
The film is a mix of archival, interview and contemporary footage of The Damned and other musicians and fans. The film discusses the rivalry between members Captain Sensible and Rat Scabies with their disagreement over unpaid royalties.

== Production ==
The film was directed by Wes Orshoski, who was also the film's producer, writer, cinematographer and editor. It was the filmmaker's follow-up to his previous documentary Lemmy. The Damned provided the music for the film. The film was shot over a three-year period.

== Release ==
The film premiered at the SXSW Film Festival on 19 March 2015. At the screening, The Damned's lead guitarist Captain Sensible shouted commentary in the auditorium whenever a moment or a former Damned member he did not like appeared in the film. Damned frontman Dave Vanian did not attend the premiere.

The film received its premier in the United Kingdom on 3 June at the Prince Charles Cinema. Rat Scabies and Brian James were present for the London premiere of the film, where Scabies stated that he hopes the film will bring closure between himself and Captain Sensible.

The film was released on Blu-ray (which also included the DVD) on 20 May 2016.

== Reception ==
Variety gave the film a positive review, stating that even an audience unfamiliar with the group may find sufficient entertainment value in the documentary, noting "the Damned's unpredictability only endeared them further to a diehard fan base, and it makes this documentary all the more entertaining". The Hollywood Reporter opined that the director "struggles to impose dramatic shape on a sprawling subject, but at least he finds an emotional hook in the decades-old rift between Sensible and Scabies"
