= Not Like Everybody Else =

Studio album by the Damned
- Released: 23 January 2026
- Recorded: 2025
- Studio: Revolver (Los Angeles)
- Genre: Rock
- Length: 34:32
- Label: earMusic
- Producer: Mikal Blue

The Damned chronology
Darkadelic (2023)	Not Like Everybody Else (2026)

Singles from Not Like Everybody Else
- 1. "There's a Ghost in My House" Released: 30 October 2025; 2. "See Emily Play" Released: 4 December 2025; 3. "Summer in the City" Released: 16 January 2026

Not Like Everybody Else is the thirteenth studio album by the English rock band the Damned, released on 23 January 2026 through earMusic and produced by Mikal Blue. It is a collection of cover songs made in tribute to the band's late guitarist Brian James.

== Background and recording ==
In March 2025, founding member and guitarist Brian James died. Later that year, in tribute of the late guitarist after the U.S. leg of a tour, the band recorded a series of cover songs that were favourites of his at Revolver Studios in Los Angeles, finishing within five days. James posthumously features on the Rolling Stones cover "The Last Time", with guitar taken from his final live performances with the band in 2022 at the Hammersmith Apollo. The album also marks drummer Rat Scabies' first studio appearance with the Damned since his return in 2024.

== Singles and release ==
Alongside the announcement for Not Like Everybody Else, it was led with the single and R. Dean Taylor cover "There's a Ghost in My House" on 30 October 2025. Two more singles were released in anticipation of the album:, the Pink Floyd cover "See Emily Play" on 4 December and the Lovin' Spoonful cover "Summer in the City" on 16 January the following year. Not Like Everybody Else was released on 23 January 2026 through the label Earmusic, and it debuted on the UK Albums Chart at no. 23.

== Critical reception ==
Professional ratings
Aggregate scores
Source	Rating
Metacritic	61/100
Review scores
Source	Rating
Blabbermouth.net	7.5/10
Buzz	5/5 stars
Classic Pop	2.5/5 stars
Classic Rock	7/10
Mojo	3/5 stars
Record Collector	2/5 stars
Spectrum Culture	68%
Spill Magazine	4/5 stars
Uncut	6/10
Under the Radar	6.5/10

According to the review aggregator Metacritic, Not Like Everybody Else received "generally favorable reviews" based on a weighted average score of 61 out of 100 from 5 critic scores.

== Track listing ==
Not Like Everybody Else track listing
No.	Title	Writer(s)	Original artist	Length
1.	"There's a Ghost in My House"	Brian Holland; Eddie Holland; Freddie Gorman; Lamont Dozier; R. Dean Taylor	R. Dean Taylor	3:02
2.	"Summer in the City"	John Sebastian; Mark Sebastian; Steve Boone	The Lovin' Spoonful	3:32
3.	"Making Time"	Kenny Pickett; Eddie Phillips	The Creation	3:06
4.	"Gimme Danger"	Iggy Pop; James Williamson	The Stooges	4:06
5.	"See Emily Play"	Syd Barrett	Pink Floyd	3:08
6.	"I'm Not Like Everybody Else"	Raymond Douglas Davies	The Kinks	3:39
7.	"Heart Full of Soul"	Graham Gouldman	The Yardbirds	2:51
8.	"You Must Be a Witch"	Fred Cole	The Lollipop Shoppe	2:37
9.	"When I Was Young"	Vic Briggs; Eric Burdon; Barry Jenkins; Danny McCulloch; John Weider	Eric Burdon & the Animals	4:33
10.	"The Last Time" (feat. Brian James)	Keith Richards; Mick Jagger	The Rolling Stones	3:52
Total length:				34:32

== Personnel ==
Credits are adapted from the vinyl liner notes.

=== The Damned ===
- Dave Vanian – vocals
- Captain Sensible – guitar, vocals
- Rat Scabies – drums
- Paul Gray – bass
- Monty Oxymoron – keyboards
- Brian James – featured guitar on "The Last Time"

=== Technical and design ===
- Mikal Blue – production, engineering, mastering
- Sebastian Martinez, Peter Weissman – engineering assistance
- Graham Humphreys – artwork
- Marek Świątek – additional layout design

== Charts ==
Chart performance for Not Like Everybody Else
Chart (2026)	Peak position
French Physical Albums (SNEP)	94
French Rock & Metal Albums (SNEP)	22
Belgian Albums (Ultratop Wallonia)	177
Scottish Albums (OCC)	6
UK Albums (OCC)	23
UK Independent Albums (OCC)	4
US Top Current Album Sales (Billboard)	48
