= Shut It =

Single by The Damned

from the album Not of This Earth
- B-side: "Shut It (Album Version)"
- Released: September 1996
- Recorded: 1996
- Length: 2:51
- Label: Cleopatra; CLP-9802
- Songwriter(s): Rat Scabies, Allan Lee Shaw
- Producer(s): David M Allen

The Damned singles chronology
"Prokofiev" (1991)	"Shut It" (1996)	"Little Miss Disaster" (2005)

"Shut It" is a song by the Damned, released as a single in September 1996 on Cleopatra Records.

The song was released to promote the Not of This Earth album, recorded by a new lineup which featured longtime members Dave Vanian and Rat Scabies, and new members Kris Dollimore (guitar), Allan Lee Shaw (guitar) and Moose (bass).

The single was only released in the US.

In 1997, just one year after the release of the single, "Shut It" was remixed by Paul Raven and released as "Shut It (Paul Raven Remix)" on Cleopatra's Industrial Mix Machine compilation.

== Track listing ==
1. "Shut It (Die Krupps Mix)" (Scabies, Shaw) – 2:51
2. "Shut It (Album Version)" (Scabies, Shaw) – 2:49

Bonus track on CD single:

1. "The Shadow of Love (Live)" (Jugg, Scabies, Vanian, Merrick) Recorded 11 July 1985 at Woolwich Coronet

== Production credits ==
- Producer:
  - David M Allen
- Musicians:
  - Dave Vanian − vocals
  - Kris Dollimore − guitar
  - Allan Lee Shaw: theme guitar, backing vocals
  - Rat Scabies − drums
  - Moose − bass
- Guest Musicians
  - James Taylor − Hammond organ on "Shut It"
  - Roman Jugg − guitar on "The Shadow of Love"
  - Bryn Merrick − bass on "The Shadow of Love"
  - Paul "Shirley" Shepley − keyboards on "The Shadow of Love"
