= Ballroom Blitz – Live at the Lyceum =

Live album by The Damned
- Released: 15 June 1992
- Recorded: 12 July 1981
- Genre: Punk
- Label: Receiver Records Limited

The Damned chronology
Final Damnation (1989)	Ballroom Blitz – Live at the Lyceum (1992)	Not of This Earth (1995)

Ballroom Blitz – Live at the Lyceum is a live album by the Damned, documenting their tour in support of the Friday 13th EP. It was recorded at the London Lyceum on 12 July 1981. It was released in June 1992 by Receiver Records Limited.

== Track listing ==
1. "I Fall"
2. "I Just Can't Be Happy Today"
3. "Plan 9 Channel 7"
4. "Smash It Up Parts I & II"
5. "Drinking About My Baby"
6. "Looking at You"
7. "I Feel Alright"
8. "Love Song"
9. "Ballroom Blitz"
10. "New Rose"
11. "In a Rut"
12. "Dr Jekyll & Mr Hyde"
13. "Melody Lee"
14. "Neat Neat Neat/New Rose (Medley)"
15. "Shakin' All Over"
