= Live at the 100 Club (The Damned album) =

Live album by The Damned
- Released: 2007
- Recorded: 6 July 1976
- Genre: Punk rock
- Label: Castle Music

Live at the 100 Club is a live album by The Damned, recorded on 6 July 1976 at London's 100 Club. The album was released in 2007, originally included as a bonus disc with the 30th Anniversary Deluxe version of The Damned's debut album, Damned Damned Damned, and later on vinyl, limited to 1,000 LPs.

The show was the first ever played by The Damned, who were opening for the Sex Pistols. According to Brian James, Sex Pistols manager Malcolm McLaren paid them £5 for the gig but charged them £10 to use the PA system.

== Track listing ==
All tracks are written by Brian James, except where noted

No.	Title	Writer(s)	Length
1.	"1 of the 2"		3:41
2.	"New Rose"		2:57
3.	"Alone"		3:50
4.	"Help"	John Lennon, Paul McCartney	1:47
5.	"Fan Club"		3:01
6.	"I Feel Alright"	David Alexander, Ron Asheton, Iggy Pop	4:20
7.	"Feel the Pain"		4:46
8.	"Fish"		1:50
9.	"I Fall"		2:10
10.	"Circles"	Pete Townshend	4:42
11.	"See Her Tonite"		2:51
12.	"I Fall"		3:08
13.	"So Messed Up"		2:38

== Personnel ==
The Damned

- Dave Vanian – vocals
- Brian James – guitar
- Captain Sensible – bass
- Rat Scabies – drums
