= The Captain's Birthday Party =

Live album by The Damned
- Released: 1986
- Recorded: 27 November 1977
- Venue: The Roundhouse, London
- Genre: Punk rock
- Label: Castle; Sanctuary
- Producer: The Damned

The Damned chronology
Phantasmagoria (1985)	The Captain's Birthday Party (1986)	Anything (1986)

The Captain's Birthday Party is a live recording by The Damned. It was recorded in November 1977 at The Roundhouse, in London and released in June 1986 on 12" blue vinyl, Remixed by Chris Heester and Engineer by Colin James for Stiff Records Ltd. In 2002, this album was released on CD by Sanctuary Records.

Shortly afterwards re-issued as Not The Captain's Birthday Party?, with the addition of "I Fall" among the tracks.

== Track listing ==
- All songs written by Brian James, except where noted.

Side one

1. "You Take My Money" – 2:20
2. "Creep (You Can't Fool Me)" – 2:10
3. "Fan Club" – 2:46
4. "Problem Child" – 2:14 ~ (Rat Scabies, James)

Side two

1. "So Messed Up" – 1:57
2. "New Rose" – 2:17
3. "I Feel Alright" – 4:32 ~ (Iggy Pop, David Alexander, Scott Asheton, Ron Asheton)
4. "Born To Kill" – 2:46

== Personnel ==
The Damned

- Dave Vanian – lead vocals
- Captain Sensible – bass, backing vocals
- Brian James – guitar
- Rat Scabies – drums
