= Darkadelic =

2023 album by The Damned

Studio album by the Damned
- Released: 28 April 2023
- Studio: Kore Studios, Acton, London; Broadfields Studios, Watford
- Genre: Punk rock; psychedelic; gothic rock
- Length: 48:27
- Label: Edel; earMUSIC
- Producer: Thomas Mitchener

The Damned chronology
Evil Spirits (2018)	Darkadelic (2023)	Not Like Everybody Else (2026)

Singles from Darkadelic
- 1. "The Invisible Man" Released: 3 February 2023; 2. "Beware of the Clown" Released: 10 March 2023; 3. "You're Gonna Realise" Released: 21 April 2023

Professional ratings
Aggregate scores
Source	Rating
Metacritic	79/100
Review scores
Source	Rating
The Arts Desk	3/5 stars
Blabbermouth.net	8/10
Classic Rock	4/5 stars
Louder Than War	4/5 stars
Mojo	4/5 stars
New Noise Magazine	3.5/5 stars
The Spill Magazine	4.5/5 stars
The Telegraph	4/5 stars
Uncut	3.5/5 stars

Darkadelic is the twelfth studio album by the British punk rock band the Damned, released on 28 April 2023 by earMUSIC.

== Background ==
The album's title has been described as recognising the Damned's "influence as a pioneering goth band and interest in psychedelia". Darkadelic is the first and only album by the Damned to feature drummer William Granville-Taylor after he replaced Pinch, who left the band in 2019.

For Darkadelic, the Damned teamed up with producer Thomas Mitchener, formerly of the bands Haunts and Spycatcher, because he was, as guitarist Captain Sensible put it, a "purveyor of the '70s sound" they were going for on the album. Singer Dave Vanian stated that, for him, "the only criteria was to have this album driven by more pronounced guitars."

Prior to recording, Sensible and Granville-Taylor spent time working out arrangements for the tracks. "We actually sat down and we listened to a few Beatles songs, 'cause the songs were so beautifully arranged on those," Sensible said. "We really arranged the drums for what's right for the song. There was a lot of brainstorming during those two weeks of laying down the basic tracks."

Prior to its release, the majority of the album was played during shows by the Damned on their April 2023 tour of the United Kingdom.

The track "Leader of the Gang" is based on the crimes of former glam rock star Gary Glitter. "Follow Me" is about influencers, and "Beware of the Clown" deals with politicians. "Wake the Dead" was written specifically to be played at funerals. Through his online activity, Sensible had become aware that Damned songs were being played at fans' funerals. "So I thought, 'Well, they're playing these songs 'cause the deceased love the band. Why not write one actually for that purpose?"

== Track listing ==
No.	Title	Writer(s)	Length
1.	"The Invisible Man"	Dave Vanian, Paul Gray	3:10
2.	"Bad Weather Girl"	Captain Sensible, Gray	4:49
3.	"You're Gonna Realise"	Vanian	2:36
4.	"Beware of the Clown"	Sensible	3:14
5.	"Western Promise"	Vanian	4:26
6.	"Wake the Dead"	Sensible, Martin Newell	5:22
7.	"Follow Me"	Sensible, Gray	3:18
8.	"Motorcycle Man"	Gray	4:45
9.	"Girl I'll Stop at Nothing"	Sensible	5:08
10.	"Leader of the Gang"	Sensible	4:18
11.	"From Your Lips"	Vanian	3:31
12.	"Roderick"	Vanian	3:50

== Personnel ==
Credits adapted from the album's liner notes.

The Damned

- Dave Vanian – vocals
- Captain Sensible – guitar, vocals (lead vocals on "Bad Weather Girl")
- Monty Oxymoron – keyboards
- Paul Gray – bass
- William Granville-Taylor – drums

Additional musicians

- Marty Love – backing vocals ("Bad Weather Girl")
- Don Jenkins – tambourine ("Beware of the Clown")
- Chris Coull – trumpet ("Western Promise", "Roderick")
- Emily Vanian – violin ("Roderick")
- Thomas Mitchener – EBow guitar ("Roderick")

Technical

- Thomas Mitchener – production, engineering, mixing
- Mark Knight – assistant (at Kore Studios)
- John Davis – mastering (at Metropolis Studios)
- Graham Humphreys – cover, layout
- David Read – 'A Damned Picture' globe

== Charts ==
Chart performance for Darkadelic
Chart (2023)	Peak position
German Albums (Offizielle Top 100)	35
Scottish Albums (OCC)	6
UK Albums (OCC)	9
UK Independent Albums (OCC)	4
UK Rock & Metal Albums (OCC)	1
US Top Album Sales (Billboard)	75
