= Prokofiev (song) =

Single by The Damned
- B-side: "Prokofiev" (Instrumental)
- Released: November 1991
- Genre: Rock
- Label: Skinnies Cut; AVL1077
- Songwriters: Rat Scabies, Brian James
- Producer: Rat Scabies

The Damned singles chronology
"Fun Factory" (1991)	"Prokofiev" (1991)	"Shut It" (1996)

"Prokofiev" was a single by the Damned, released in November 1991 on the Skinnies Cut label.

The song was recorded in June 1990 in Rat Scabies' home studio, consisting of a loop of the Stooges' song "Gimme Danger", over which Brian James improvised guitar and sound effects. At a later point, vocals by Dave Vanian were added.

The single was sold on the Damned's September 1991 reunion tour of the US and came without a picture sleeve. It was later remixed for Not of This Earth in 1996.

== Track listing ==
1. "Prokofiev" (Rat Scabies, Brian James)
2. "Prokofiev (Instrumental)" (Scabies, James)

== Production credits ==
- Producer:
  - Rat Scabies
- Musicians:
  - Dave Vanian − vocals
  - Brian James − guitar, sound effects
