= Final Damnation =

Live album by The Damned
- Released: 28 August 1989
- Recorded: 13 June 1988
- Genre: Punk rock
- Label: Essential ESSLP 008

The Damned chronology
The Light at the End of the Tunnel (1987)	Final Damnation (1989)	Ballroom Blitz – Live at the Lyceum (1992)

Professional ratings
Review scores
Source	Rating
Hi-Fi News & Record Review	B:1

Final Damnation is a live album by the Damned. The album was recorded at The Town & Country Club in London on 13 June 1988. It was originally released in August 1989 by Essential, and was later re-released on DVD.

The track list starts with the original line‑up of band members and transitions through later incarnations, each assembly of members performing the songs that group originally recorded in the studio. It was recorded at a time when the band were in a chaotic state, without a record contract, after being dropped by their only major label, MCA. Various line-ups based on this show would tour until the Damned released the "Fun Factory" single.

== Track listing ==
1. "See Her Tonite"
2. "Neat Neat Neat"
3. "Born to Kill"
4. "I Fall"
5. "Fan Club"
6. "Fish"
7. "Help!"
8. "New Rose"
9. "I Feel Alright"
10. "I Just Can't Be Happy Today"
11. "Wait for the Blackout"
12. "Melody Lee"
13. "Noise Noise Noise"
14. "Love Song"
15. "Smash It Up Parts I & II"
16. "Looking at You"
17. "The Last Time"

== Personnel ==
- Dave Vanian − vocals
- Rat Scabies − drums
- Brian James – guitar (1–9, 16, 17)
- Captain Sensible – bass (1–9), guitar (10–17), backing vocals
- Bryn Merrick – bass (10–17), backing vocals
- Roman Jugg – keyboards (10–17), backing vocals
