= So, Who's Paranoid? =

Studio album by The Damned
- Released: 17 November 2008
- Recorded: 2005–2008
- Studio: The Doghouse Studio, Henley-on-Thames, Oxfordshire; Chapel Studios, South Thoresby, Lincolnshire; Audio Design Recording, San Diego, California
- Genre: Punk rock; pop-punk; gothic rock; psychedelic
- Length: 65:59
- Label: The English Channel

The Damned chronology
Grave Disorder (2001)	So, Who's Paranoid? (2008)	Evil Spirits (2018)

Singles from So, Who's Paranoid?
- 1. "Little Miss Disaster" Released: 1 December 2005; 2. "A Nation Fit for Heroes" Released: 2010

Professional ratings
Review scores
Source	Rating
Allmusic	3/5 stars
Chart Attack	2/5 stars
The Great Rock Bible	6/10
The Guardian	3/5 stars
Louder	3/5 stars
Slant Magazine	3/5 stars
Record Collector	4/4 stars

So, Who's Paranoid is the tenth studio album by English punk rock band the Damned. Released in November 2008, it was their first album in seven years. It was funded by the band themselves and released on their English Channel label. Musically, the album largely draws from the band's 1980s gothic rock sound.

== Reception ==
Guardian critic Dave Simpson thought it was their best album in a while and said the album "takes a lead from 1980's superb The Black Album by skipping through genres" and "fabulous pop anthems such as "Perfect Sunday" may find them a new audience even now." While Cameron Gordon, writing for Chart Attack, wasn't so kind. He said the album "blows", was "a really tedious album to absorb" and contains "either generic pop-punk blandness or self-indulgent silliness". Allmusic critic Mark Deming said " there is practically nothing on So, Who's Paranoid? that resembles punk rock as we know it", he suggested it was more likely to appeal to people who liked the band's later albums, like Strawberries and Phantasmagoria. Slant Magazine said it "rises above mediocrity" but Record Collector said it was a "beautifully controlled blend of melody and dynamic".

The closing track "Dark Asteroid" is a tribute to Pink Floyd founder Syd Barrett, who died two years previously.

== Track listing ==
Songwriting credits adapted from BMI.

All songs written by Captain Sensible, except where noted.

1. "A Nation Fit for Heroes" (Sensible, Martin Newell) – 3:57
2. "Under the Wheels" (Sensible, Pinch) – 5:02
3. "Dr. Woofenstein" (Sensible, Pinch) – 5:54
4. "Shallow Diamonds" – 3:34
5. "Since I Met You" (Monty Oxymoron) – 4:07
6. "A Danger to Yourself" – 4:04
7. "Maid for Pleasure" – 4:34
8. "Perfect Sunday" (Sensible, Dave Vanian) – 4:42
9. "Nature's Dark Passion" (Oxymoron) – 4:11
10. "Little Miss Disaster" – 4:23
11. "Just Hangin'" – 3:58
12. "Nothing" (Sensible, Stu West) – 3:41
13. "Dark Asteroid" – 14:02

- (a). "Dark Asteroid Part 1"
- (b). "Dark Asteroid Part 2" (Sensible, Vanian, Oxymoron, West, Pinch)

Reissue bonus tracks

14. "Half Forgotten Memories" – 6:02
15. "Aim to Please" – 2:43
16. "Time" (B-side to "A Nation Fit for Heroes") – 3:41

== Personnel ==
Credits adapted from the album's liner notes.

The Damned

- Dave Vanian – lead vocals
- Captain Sensible – guitar, backing vocals
- Monty Oxymoron – keyboards, backing vocals
- Pinch – drums, backing vocals
- Stu West – bass

Additional musicians

- Bela Emerson – cello, saw on "Nature's Dark Passion"
- The Brighton Gay Men's Chorus – vocal harmonies on "Dr. Woofenstein"
- Lorraine Bowen – conductor, arranger on "Dr. Woofenstein"

Technical

- Adam Whittaker – engineer, mixing on "Nature's Dark Passion", "Since I Met You" and "Dark Asteroid"
- Jim Spencer – mixing
- Ewan Davies – engineer on "Perfect Sunday" and "Little Miss Disaster", mixing on "Little Miss Disaster"
- Ben Moore – engineer (drum tracks) on "Dr. Woofenstein"
- Adrian Wear – artwork, sleeve design

== Release history ==
Region	Date	Label	Format	Catalog	Notes
UK	17 November 2008	The English Channel	CD	CHANDAM13	
US	12 December 2008	The English Channel / Redeye	CD	CHANDAM13	
UK (reissue)	1 July 2010	Devils Jukebox Records	LP	DJB66643LP	Limited-edition two-album set; includes the bonus tracks "Aim to Please" and "Half Forgotten Memories"
UK (reissue)	2014	Let Them Eat Vinyl	LP	LETV358LP	Limited-edition two-album set; includes the bonus tracks "Half Forgotten Memories", "Aim to Please" and "Time"
UK (reissue)	2014	Southworld Recordings	CD	SWGC112CD	Includes the bonus tracks "Half Forgotten Memories", "Aim to Please" and "Time"
US (reissue)	10 March 2015	4Worlds Media	CD	FWUS047CD	Includes the bonus tracks "Half Forgotten Memories", "Aim to Please" and "Time"
