= Live Shepperton 1980 =

Live album by the Damned
- Released: 1982
- Recorded: Shepperton Studios, 26 July 1980 (Shepperton)
- Genre: Punk rock, post-punk
- Label: Ace Records
- Producer: The Damned

The Damned chronology
The Black Album (1980)	Live Shepperton 1980 (1982)	Strawberries (1982)

Live Shepperton 1980 is a 1982 album by the Damned, their first live album.

== Background ==
This recording was made live at a special gig played for the members of The Damned Fan Club at Shepperton, England in 1980. Six of the tracks were originally released as side 4 of The Black Album in the UK. (Those tracks are Side One: 1-3 and Side Two: 2–4.)

== Track listing ==
- All songs written by Rat Scabies, Captain Sensible, Dave Vanian and Algy Ward, except where noted.

=== Side One ===
1. "Love Song" - 2:10
2. "Second Time Around (Machine Gun Etiquette)" - 1:41
3. "I Just Can’t Be Happy Today" (Rat Scabies, Captain Sensible, Dave Vanian, Algy Ward, Giovanni Dadomo) - 3:55
4. "Melody Lee" - 2:06
5. "Help!" (Lennon/McCartney) - 1:30
6. "Neat Neat Neat" (Brian James) - 4:37

=== Side Two ===
1. "Looking at You" (Michael Davis, Wayne Kramer, Fred "Sonic" Smith, Dennis Thompson, Rob Tyner) - 5:46
2. "Smash It Up (Parts 1 And 2)" - 4:22
3. "New Rose" (Brian James) - 1:48
4. "Plan 9 Channel 7" - 4:47

== Personnel ==
The Damned

- Dave Vanian - lead vocals, keyboards
- Captain Sensible - guitar, keyboards, backing vocals
- Paul Gray - bass
- Rat Scabies - drums
