= Fun Factory (song) =

Song by The Damned

Single by The Damned
- B-side: "A Riot on Eastbourne Pier (Remix)"
- Released: 28 January 1991
- Recorded: 1983, 1989
- Genre: Rock
- Length: 3:59
- Label: Deltic; DELT (7")
- Songwriter: Captain Sensible
- Producer: Captain Sensible

The Damned singles chronology
| "In Dulce Decorum" (1987) | "Fun Factory" (1991) | "Prokofiev" (1991) |

"Fun Factory" is a single by the English rock band the Damned, released in January 1991 on Deltic Records.

The band had split in 1989, but reformed shortly thereafter for touring. Captain Sensible was set to return, and sought the other band members' permission to reissue the track "Fun Factory", recorded in the late 1982 (and featuring King Crimson's Robert Fripp on guitar), but shelved when the Damned's record company (Bronze Records) went bankrupt in early 1983. While it was not attached to any Damned album, it has been issued on several compilations.

The B-side was a solo track by Sensible, a remix of a track from his 1989 solo album Revolution Now. The bonus tracks on the 12" and CD singles were also solo Sensible works.

== Track listing ==
1. "Fun Factory" (Sensible) - 3:59
2. "A Riot on Eastbourne Pier (Remix)" (Sensible)

12"/CD single: -

1. "Fun Factory" (Sensible) - 3:59
2. "A Riot on Eastbourne Pier (Remix)" (Sensible)
3. "Freedom" (Sensible)
4. "Pasties" (Sensible)

== Production credits ==
- Producer:
  - Captain Sensible
- Musicians:
  - Dave Vanian − vocals on "Fun Factory"
  - Captain Sensible − guitar, vocals
  - Rat Scabies − drums
  - Paul Gray − bass on "Fun Factory" & "A Riot On Eastbourne Pier"
- Guest Musician
  - Robert Fripp − guitar on "Fun Factory"
