= Evil Spirits (album) =

Album by The Damned

Studio album by the Damned
- Released: 13 April 2018
- Recorded: November 2017
- Studios: Atomic Sound, Brooklyn, New York
- Genre: Punk rock
- Length: 41:06
- Labels: Search and Destroy, Spinefarm
- Producer: Tony Visconti

The Damned chronology
| So, Who's Paranoid? (2008) | Evil Spirits (2018) | Black Is the Night: The Definitive Anthology (2019) |

Singles from Evil Spirits
- 1. "Standing on the Edge of Tomorrow" Released: 19 January 2018; 2. "Devil in Disguise" Released: March 2018; 3. "Look Left" Released: March 2018; 4. "Procrastination" Released: 9 April 2018

Professional ratings
Aggregate scores
| Source | Rating |
|---|---|
| Metacritic | 75/100 |
Review scores
| Source | Rating |
| AllMusic | 3.5/5 stars |
| The Arts Desk | 4/5 stars |
| Classic Rock | 4/5 stars |
| Drowned in Sound | 7/10 |
| Exclaim! | 7/10 |
| Mojo | 4/5 stars |
| PopMatters | 7/10 |
| Record Collector | 4/5 stars |
| Slant Magazine | 3/5 stars |
| Uncut | 4/5 stars |

Evil Spirits is the eleventh studio album from the Damned. Released on 13 April 2018, it was their first album in ten years and was produced by famed producer Tony Visconti who is best known for his work with David Bowie, and features bassist Paul Gray rejoining the band after a 20 year absence. The album was largely crowdfunded by a successful PledgeMusic campaign.

== Background ==
Captain Sensible said of the album: "we deliberately recorded the album retro style, the same way our debut album was made, basically. There's something wonderful about the seventies sounds; glam, rock and punk records, they all sound so great and Tony specializes in beautifully crafted old school production. He had us all playing live, bashing it out in the same room with a focus on getting the initial band version of each song as close as possible to the finished thing."

== Reception ==
The album received some of the best reviews in years for the Damned. Zachary Hoskins of Slant Magazine said, "The Damned sounds like the same band they were 35 years ago. While it's admittedly hard not to miss the explosive presence of drummer Rat Scabies, Sensible's lashing power chords on "The Devil in Disguise" are a welcome reminder that this is still technically a punk band, and David Vanian's baritone has aged into a powerful growl reminiscent of latter-day Nick Cave. While Evil Spirits isn't a late-career masterpiece, Visconti's production chops have at least ensured a warm and rich listening experience." Ian Rushbury of PopMatters said, "Evil Spirits is a strong, weirdly timeless album. It's hard to pin this record down to a point in time – it certainly doesn't sound like 2018, but it sure as eggs are eggs doesn't sound like it's from 1978 either. It sounds like a band stretching out and having fun in a studio, under the watchful eye of someone who is accustomed to working with mavericks and outcasts." Evil Spirits became the band's first album to make the top 10 on the United Kingdom's Official Charts, peaking at number seven.

== Track listing ==
| No. | Title | Writer(s) | Length |
|---|---|---|---|
| 1. | "Standing on the Edge of Tomorrow" | Dave Vanian | 4:10 |
| 2. | "Devil in Disguise" | Pinch; Pat Beers | 4:31 |
| 3. | "We're So Nice" | Captain Sensible | 4:09 |
| 4. | "Look Left" | Pinch; Jon Priestley | 4:43 |
| 5. | "Evil Spirits" | Sensible | 3:54 |
| 6. | "Shadow Evocation" | Vanian; Monty Oxymoron | 4:10 |
| 7. | "Sonar Deceit" | Sensible | 4:12 |
| 8. | "Procrastination" | Oxymoron; Sensible | 3:50 |
| 9. | "Daily Liar" | Vanian; Sensible | 5:55 |
| 10. | "I Don't Care" | Vanian | 3:16 |

== Personnel ==
Credits adapted from the album's liner notes, except where noted.

The Damned

- Dave Vanian – vocals
- Captain Sensible – guitar
- Monty Oxymoron – keyboards
- Paul Gray – bass
- Pinch – drums

Additional musicians

- Chris Coull – trumpet
- Kristeen Young – backing vocals

Technical

- Tony Visconti – producer, mixing, backing vocals
- Kevin Killen – engineer
- Erin Tonkon – assistant engineer
- Joe LaPorta – mastering engineer
- Jez Larder – pre-production (AudioBeach Studios, Brighton, East Sussex)
- Jon Priestley – pre-production (Abatis Studios, Honiley, Warwickshire)
- Mitchell Thomas – front cover design
- Laurence Thomas – front cover design
- Alex Tillbrook – additional artwork
- Shigeo Jones Kikuchi – photography
- Kurt Steinmetz – photography
- Steven Gullick – photography
- John Nikolai – photography

== Charts ==
| Chart (2018) | Peak position |
|---|---|
| Irish Albums (IRMA) | 88 |
| Scottish Albums (Official Charts) | 5 |
| UK Albums (Official Charts) | 7 |
