= Friday 13th (EP) =

Friday 13th EP

EP by The Damned
- Released: 13 November 1981
- Recorded: October 1981
- Studio: Rockfield Studios, Rockfield, Wales
- Genre: Punk rock
- Length: 14:17
- Label: NEMS
- Producer: Tony "Broozer" Mansfield

The Damned chronology
There Ain't No Sanity Clause (1980)	Friday 13th EP (1981)	Lovely Money (1982)

Friday 13th EP is a four-track EP by English rock band the Damned, issued as the result of a one-off deal with the NEMS Records label. It was released on 13 November 1981, which fell on a Friday.

The EP was released in the UK and Sweden on 7" vinyl, and also in Germany on 12" vinyl. In 1981, EPs were still eligible for the UK Top 75 Singles chart, and Friday 13th reached No. 50.

The lead-off track, "Disco Man", was featured on many compilations, also becoming a live favourite. Two of the other three tracks, "Billy Bad Breaks" and "Limit Club", were composed by the band; the final track was a cover version of The Rolling Stones song "Citadel". "Limit Club" was a tribute to the late Malcolm Owen of The Ruts.

== Track listing ==
All songs written by Rat Scabies, Captain Sensible, Paul Gray and Dave Vanian, except where noted.

1. "Disco Man" – 3:20
2. "Limit Club" – 4:15
3. "Billy Bad Breaks" – 3:53
4. "Citadel" (Mick Jagger, Keith Richards) – 2:48

== Personnel ==
The Damned

- Dave Vanian − vocals
- Captain Sensible − guitar, keyboards, backing vocals
- Rat Scabies − drums
- Paul Gray − bass

Technical personnel

- Tony "Broozer" Mansfield − production
- Paul Cobbold − engineering

Cover Design

- Linda Roast

== Charts ==
Chart (1981)	Peak position
UK Singles Chart	50
UK Indie Chart	2
