= The Black Album (The Damned album) =

Studio album with live tracks by the Damned
- Released: 3 November 1980
- Recorded: May–June and 26 July 1980
- Venue: Shepperton Studios, Shepperton, 26 July 1980
- Studio: Rockfield Studios, Monmouth, Wales, May–June 1980
- Genre: Gothic rock; punk rock; psychedelia
- Length: 77:42
- Label: Chiswick
- Producer: The Damned (as the Kings of Reverb); Hans Zimmer

The Damned chronology
Machine Gun Etiquette (1979)	The Black Album (1980)	Strawberries (1982)

Singles from The Black Album
- 1. "The History of the World (Part 1)" Released: 26 September 1980; 2. "Dr Jekyll & Mr Hyde" Released: 13 February 1981 (US); 3. "Wait for the Blackout" Released: May 1982; 4. "Lively Arts" Released: October 1982

The Black Album is the fourth studio album by the English punk rock band the Damned, and the first to feature Paul Gray on bass guitar. It was released on 3 November 1980 by Chiswick as a double album, with "Curtain Call" filling the whole of side three, and a selection of live tracks recorded at Shepperton Studios at a special concert for Damned fan club members on side four. The album peaked at No. 29 on the UK Charts.

== Background ==
The Black Album represented a change in the career of the group and an expansion of their sound with psychedelic elements. AllMusic critic Ned Raggett noted that "some of the numbers show the band following their original punk vein, but by this point the four...were leaving straight, three-chord thrash to the cul-de-sac revivalists", and that it was "a chance for the band to try everything from straightforward rock to gentler atmospherics". Raggett described "Wait for the Blackout" as a "dramatic psych/punk surge" with "overtly-serious goth affectations", and qualified "Drinking About My Baby" as "goofy but still enjoyable". Captain Sensible later said that Dave Vanian's vocals were moving to a darker direction, and stated "It is goth; we didn't set out to do that but that is just the way it is. He did have a hearse, he was a gravedigger".

The song "13th Floor Vendetta" paid tribute to the film The Abominable Dr. Phibes (1971), opening with the lyrics "...the organ plays to midnight on Maldine Square tonight".

Hans Zimmer German film score composer and music producer contributed to the album. In 1980, Zimmer co-produced a single, "History of the World, Part 1", with, and for The Damned, which was also included on The Black Album which carried the description of his efforts as "Over-Produced by Hans Zimmer."

== Release ==
Initially, Chiswick issued Wait for the Blackout instead of The History of the World (Part 1) as a single to promote The Black Album (1980) in Spain, with "Dr Jekyll & Mr Hyde" as the B-side. In 1982, their Big Beat budget imprint reissued the track as a single in the UK, despite The Damned having left the label two years previously. The B-side was provided by Damned guitarist Captain Sensible's spin-off project, Captain Sensible and the Softies, in the form of "Jet Boy Jet Girl". This was a cover version of the 1977 recording by Elton Motello, which shared its backing track with Plastic Bertrand's "Ça plane pour moi". The writing credit for Ward refers to Motello, real name Alan Ward, not ex-Damned bass player Algy Ward.

"Wait for the Blackout" was covered by The Goo Goo Dolls for the Tommy Boy soundtrack. It finally saw release on The Goo Goo Dolls' Greatest Hits Volume 2, released on August 19, 2008. It was covered by Alkaline Trio on BYO Split Series, Vol. 5 as well as on the 2007 release Remains.

=== Reissues ===
The Damned's Chiswick back catalogue was acquired by Big Beat in 1981, and The Black Album was reissued in August 1982 as a single album that omitted "Curtain Call" and the live tracks. The artwork for the reissue parodied the sleeve of the Beatles' The White Album, rendered in black with no details other than the group's name embossed in capitals. "It was said that the Beatles had their White Album, we had our Black Album", said Vanian. "The sleeve isn't related to the Beatles in any way". However, Scabies said: "Of course it was to do with the Beatles, I was so sick about the debates of what we should have on the front of it. I said: 'Put the thing in a plain black sleeve and we'll have a go at the Beatles and The White Album". The live tracks were reissued in their own right, with four extra tracks, as Live Shepperton 1980.

The first subsequent reissue of The Black Album on CD reinstated "Curtain Call" and the original artwork, and the 2005 double-CD reissue also reinstated the live tracks.

== Tour ==
The 28-date Black Album UK tour began in November 1980, with reformed 1970s street punk band the Straps as support.

== Critical reception ==
Professional ratings
Review scores
Source	Rating
AllMusic	3.5/5 stars

In a retrospective review for AllMusic, critic Ned Raggett called the album hit-or-miss, but added that "tracks of note are still thick on the ground" and that "it's still a surprisingly good blast, a tour de force for Vanian particularly".

Stewart Voegtlin of Stylus Magazine praised the album saying it is "Truly a tale of four sides, this mildly schizophrenic record oscillates between a single side of neon'd, less than zero pop and three slabs of punk songs that sound like a besotted U.K. Subs intoning glee club favourites from boarding school's past." noting Vanian's vocals as "baritone sneers, part dandy, part deviant," describing the album as "Drums and guitars spar; voices wrap their arms around one another and try to outlung the lot: all spit, smiles, and undulating uvulas."

Ian Fortnam of Louder in a glowing review stated "it still stands as The Damned’s psychedelic goth-punk magnum opus." and said "Sounding for all the world like the best album the late-60s Who never made (with ex-Hot Rods bassist Paul Gray channelling his inner Entwistle), Wait For The Blackout, 13th Floor Vendetta and the side-long Curtain Call are well worth the hefty price of admission alone."

== Track listing ==
All tracks are written by Rat Scabies, Captain Sensible, Paul Gray and Dave Vanian, except as noted.

Side one
No.	Title	Writer(s)	Length
1.	"Wait for the Blackout"	Scabies; Sensible; Gray; Vanian; Billy Karloff	3:51
2.	"Lively Arts"		2:59
3.	"Silly Kids Games"		2:35
4.	"Drinking About My Baby"		3:04
5.	"Twisted Nerve"		4:39
6.	"Hit or Miss"		2:37

Side two
No.	Title	Writer(s)	Length
7.	"Dr. Jekyll and Mr. Hyde"	Scabies; Sensible; Gray; Vanian; Giovanni Dadomo	4:35
8.	"Sick of This and That"		1:50
9.	"The History of the World (Part 1)"		3:45
10.	"13th Floor Vendetta"		5:05
11.	"Therapy"	Scabies; Sensible; Gray; Vanian; Fay Hart	6:12

Side three
No.	Title	Length
12.	"Curtain Call"	17:13

Side four
No.	Title	Writer(s)	Length
13.	"Love Song" (live)	Scabies; Sensible; Vanian; Algy Ward	2:10
14.	"Second Time Around" (live)	Scabies; Sensible; Vanian; Ward	1:46
15.	"Smash It Up (Parts 1 & 2)" (live)	Scabies; Sensible; Vanian; Ward	4:24
16.	"New Rose" (live)	Brian James	1:49
17.	"I Just Can't Be Happy Today" (live)	Scabies; Sensible; Vanian; Ward; Dadomo	3:55
18.	"Plan 9 Channel 7" (live)	Scabies; Sensible; Vanian; Ward	5:12

Note

- The song titled "Second Time Around" was also known as "Machine Gun Etiquette", the title track from the band's previous album.

=== 2005 deluxe edition ===
Disc one

The first disc contains the 12 tracks from side one to side three of the original release.

Disc two

The second disc contains the 6 tracks from side four of the original release plus 9 bonus tracks.

No.	Title	Writer(s)	Length
7.	"White Rabbit" (non-album single)	Grace Slick	3:00
8.	"Rabid (Over You)" (B-side)	Scabies; Sensible; Vanian; Andy Le Vien	3:44
9.	"Seagulls" (B-side)	Scabies; Sensible; Vanian	2:36
10.	"The History of the World (Part 1)" (single version)		3:48
11.	"I Believe the Impossible" (B-side)		2:54
12.	"Sugar and Spite" (B-side)		1:30
13.	"There Ain't No Sanity Clause" (non-album single)	Scabies; Sensible; Vanian; Dadomo	2:29
14.	"Looking at You" (live) (B-side)	Michael Davis; Wayne Kramer; Fred "Sonic" Smith; Dennis Thompson; Rob Tyner	5:51
15.	"White Rabbit" (extended version; previously unreleased original mix)	Slick	5:24

Notes

- "White Rabbit" – produced by the Damned and Roger Armstrong at Wessex Studios, London, April 1980; engineered by Tony Taverner; mixing on "White Rabbit" extended version engineered by Robin Black; released as a single in France and Germany only but available in the UK on import in July 1980.
- "Rabid (Over You)" and "Seagulls" – produced by the Damned at Wessex Studios, February 1980; recording and mixing on "Rabid (Over You)" engineered by Gary Edwards; "Seagulls" engineered by Alvin Clark; synthesizer on "Rabid (Over You)" by Anthony More; B-sides to "White Rabbit".
- "The History of the World (Part 1)" single version – sound effects recorded at Nova Suite, London, August 1980; overdubs and mixing engineered by Steve Rance; released on 22 September 1980.
- "I Believe the Impossible" and "Sugar and Spite" – recorded by Captain Sensible and Rat Scabies (lead vocals on "I Believe the Impossible" by Captain Sensible); recording date and location unknown; B-sides to "The History of the World (Part 1)".
- "There Ain't No Sanity Clause" – produced by the Damned at Rockfield Studios, May–June 1980; released as a single on 24 November 1980.
- "Looking at You" – recorded live at Shepperton Studios, 26 July 1980; B-side to "There Ain't No Sanity Clause".

== Personnel ==
Credits adapted from the 2005 edition liner notes.

The Damned

- Dave Vanian – lead vocals (all but 3), backing vocals (10), harmonium (12)
- Captain Sensible – electric and acoustic guitars, keyboards, backing and lead (3) vocals
- Paul Gray – bass
- Rat Scabies – drums, rhythm guitar and backing vocals (4)

Additional musicians

- Hans Zimmer – synthesizer (2, 9)
- Ray Martinez – trumpet (5, 7)
- Hugh Jones – backing vocals (10)

Technical

- The Damned – producer (all but 9)
- Hans Zimmer – producer (9)
- Hugh Jones – engineer
- Dave Vanian – artwork concept, design
- Allan Ballard – photography
- H. Leadbitter – design execution
