= Testify (The Damned EP) =

EP by The Damned
- Released: 1997
- Recorded: 1985, 1996
- Genre: Rock, industrial
- Length: 24:13
- Label: Cleopatra
- Producer: Judson Leach

The Damned chronology
Fiendish Shadows (1996)	Testify (1997)	Eternal Damnation Live (1999)

Professional ratings
Review scores
Source	Rating
AllMusic	1.5/5 stars

Testify is a remix EP by The Damned, released by Cleopatra Records in 1997.

== Composition ==
The EP consists of remixes of material from their 1996 album Not of This Earth. Among those contributing were the UK Subs (Track 1), Birmingham 6 (Track 2), Claus Larsen (Track 3), Damien Deville of Nosferatu (Track 4), Matt Green (Track 5) and Romell Regulacion (Track 6). A bonus live version of MC5's "Looking at You" recorded at Woolwich Coronet on 11 July 1985, the same gig as Fiendish Shadows live album (but not included on that release) was included as a "bonus track" – something of a misnomer as the EP's never been issued without it.

== Release ==
The EP was initially released in the United States only, but is relatively easy to find imported in the UK, among others. It was later included on Cleopatra's Damned Box Set.

== Track listing ==
All tracks composed by Rat Scabies and Alan Lee Shaw; except where indicated

1. "Testify" (UK Subs Mix) – 2:19
2. "I Need a Life – Resurrected" (Birmingham 6 Mix) – 4:40
3. "Shadow to Fall" (Leæther Strip Mix) – 3:39
4. "Testify" (Nosferatu Mix) – 2:57
5. "No More Tears" (Spahn Ranch Mix) – 3:58
6. "Shadow to Fall – Hypersensitive" (Razed in Black Mix) – 3:00
7. "Looking at You" (Live) (MC5) – 3:37
