= Not of This Earth (The Damned album) =

Studio album by The Damned
- Released: 11 November 1995
- Recorded: 1994
- Studio: Connie's Studio, Cologne
- Length: 42:34
- Label: Toshiba
- Producer: David M Allen

The Damned chronology
Anything (1986)	Not of This Earth (1995)	Grave Disorder (2001)

Singles from Not of This Earth
- 1. "Shut It" Released: September 1996

Not of This Earth is the eighth studio album by The Damned, released on 11 November 1995. It is often called I'm Alright Jack & The Beanstalk.

== History ==
The album has a convoluted history. Following the Final Damnation concerts in 1988, the original line-up of the band (singer Dave Vanian, guitarist Brian James, bass guitarist Captain Sensible and drummer Rat Scabies) had briefly collaborated to record the track "Prokofiev", which had a low-key USA-only release on the independent Skinnies Cut label.

Over the following months, Scabies worked on collaborative demo recordings with James and guitarist Kris Dollimore. James soon moved on. Scabies and Dollimore then recruited bass player Moose (formerly with New Model Army), the trio travelling to Scotland to work on further demos.

Initial attempts to persuade Vanian to join the project were unsuccessful, as the singer was dismissive of the demo songs. Scabies abandoned the material, and began working with Alan Lee Shaw (who had previously played guitar for The Rings, The Maniacs, The Physicals and Brian James' band Brains). This time the new material progressed further, Dollimore rejoined the project and a number of bassists were auditioned before Moose returned. Alternative singers were suggested (including recent Take That departed Robbie Williams, and Joe Strummer) before Vanian was contacted again. Vanian reversed his original decision and completed the new line-up as singer.

A period of rehearsal followed, and the new band debuted at The Dome in Tufnell Park under the moniker The Damagement. At this point the decision was taken to revert to The Damned banner.

The new line-up performed a BBC Radio 1 session in November 1993, and then toured the UK, U.S. and Japan. The group's recordings had built a cult following in Japan, and following excellent reception of the new material at the gigs there, Toshiba offered the group the funding to record it as an album.

Recording took place at the late Connie Plank's studio in Germany, before additional tracks were overdubbed at the Stoneroom Studio back in the UK. None of the Scabies/Dollimore material was used, all songs coming from Scabies/Shaw (as a side-note, Scabies is listed under his real name of Chris Millar in the writing credits). James Taylor of James Taylor Quartet fame added Hammond organ to some tracks, while ex-Sex Pistols bass player Glen Matlock played on "Tailspin" and part of "Never Could Believe".

The results were issued by Toshiba as Not of This Earth in Japan in November 1995, with a remix of "Prokofiev" as an unlisted 'hidden' track.

By this time, the new line-up was breaking up. Vanian wanted to continue touring to cover the costs of his divorce, and was performing with his Phantom Chords project. Scabies was less keen to continue saturating their live work, fearing playing to smaller audiences. The pair also disagreed over the writing of the album. A proposed tour of small venues was shelved, apart from a one-off show at Plymouth Cooperage, the line-up's final live performance. The band split in August 1995, and by August 1996 would be reforming once more – this time with Vanian accompanied by Captain Sensible instead of Scabies.

The Vanian/Scabies/Shaw/Dollimore/Moose line-up have featured on two other Damned releases – the remix EP Testify and the live album Molten Lager.

== Release ==
Much confusion has sprung up about the Not of This Earth/I'm Alright Jack & the Beanstalk album. The Damned's official site formerly carried the unhelpful message "Not intended for release in this form" on its discography page on the album, and the music press often referred to 2001's Grave Disorder as the group's first release since Anything in 1986. Several sources list it as a compilation album. Both versions of the album are listed separately on their official website's discography page with their respective artworks.

In April 1996, the Marble Orchard label issued the album in the UK, now titled I'm Alright Jack & the Beanstalk (inspired by a phrase used by an acquaintance of Scabies'). This had apparently been the planned title of the album all along, but had been considered too much of a mouthful for the Japanese market.

The cover was a 3D lenticular design, using the Japanese artwork as a background for a risqué animation. This version of the album was also issued in Germany and Sweden. The album also saw a release in the USA in 1996, but this release, on the Cleopatra label, was titled Not of This Earth once again, and featured totally different cover artwork.

To further the confusion about the album's name, Castle Music reissued it as I'm Alright Jack & the Beanstalk in the USA in 2002, with Imperial doing the same in Japan. Recently, thanks to the ease of importing CDs and the rise of internet shopping, copies of the US release of Not of This Earth can be easily found in Europe, with Cleopatra also reissuing the album in The Damned Box Set in 1999 (with the Testify remix EP, and compilation The Chaos Years).

The Castle release (also reissued in the UK in 2002) featured a non-lenticular sleeve based on the original Japanese artwork, and also included the four tracks cut at the 29 November 1993 Radio 1 session as bonus tracks.

== Reception ==
Professional ratings
Review scores
Source	Rating
AllMusic	2/5 stars
Alternative Press	4/5 stars

The album was not received well critically nor did the album chart.

Jack Rabid of Allmusic gave the album two stars in a mixed review of the album citing the absence of Captain Sensible to be the largest fault within the album, comparing it to the band's album Anything (1986) (which did not feature Captain Sensible), saying,"1986's Anything should have been titled Nothing, and the follow-up a decade later is equally disappointing, if only by Damned standards."..."the material recalls the band's 1984 '60s-tribute LP as Naz Nomad & the Nightmares." however said that if listeners were not familiar with group then "Not of This Earth is a perfectly solid LP, filled with catchy little numbers such as "I Need a Life" and "My Desire," which still show plenty of overrated indie types and alt-rockers a thing or two. Besides, Scabies is one of the best drummers of the last two decades, and Vanian's familiar voice is a treat." and concluded that the only stand out track was "Shadow to Fall"

== Track listing ==
All songs written by Alan Lee Shaw and Rat Scabies, except where noted.

1. "I Need a Life" – 3:20
2. "Testify" – 2:56
3. "Shut It" – 2:48
4. "Tailspin" – 4:13
5. "Not of This Earth" – 2:55
6. "Running Man" – 5:06
7. "My Desire" – 2:48
8. "Never Could Believe" – 4:57
9. "Heaven Can Take Your Lies" – 3:49
10. "Shadow to Fall" – 3:02
11. "No More Tears" – 5:14
12. "Prokofiev" (Scabies, Brian James) – 3:24

Original Japanese track List :-

1. "Shadow to Fall" - 3:04
2. "Tailspin"- 4:09
3. "Testify" - 2:57
4. "Running Man" - 5:13
5. "Never Could Believe" - 4:54
6. "No More Tears" - 5:13
7. "I Need a Life" - 3:22
8. "My Desire" - 2:43
9. "Shut It" - 2:44
10. "Not of This Earth" - 2:52
11. "Heaven Can Take Your Lies" - 39.50 ("Heaven" runs for 3:59, followed by 5 seconds of laughter, "machine noise" - 4:32, "Prokofiev" - 3:27, & "Answer Machine Messages" 1:32, punctuated by long periods of silence)

== Personnel ==
The Damned

- Dave Vanian – lead vocals
- Kris Dollimore – lead guitar
- Alan Lee Shaw – "theme guitar", backing vocals
- Rat Scabies – drums, piano
- Jason "Moose" Harris – bass, backing vocals

with:

- James Taylor – Hammond organ
- Glen Matlock – bass guitar on "Tailspin" and "Never Could Believe"

Technical

- Ian Caple – engineer
- David M Allen – producer
- NB: Alan Lee Shaw is credited with "Theme Guitar" – his own descriptive term for his thematic style of rhythm guitar, added to the album credits by Scabies as a joke.
