= Monty Oxymoron =

British musician

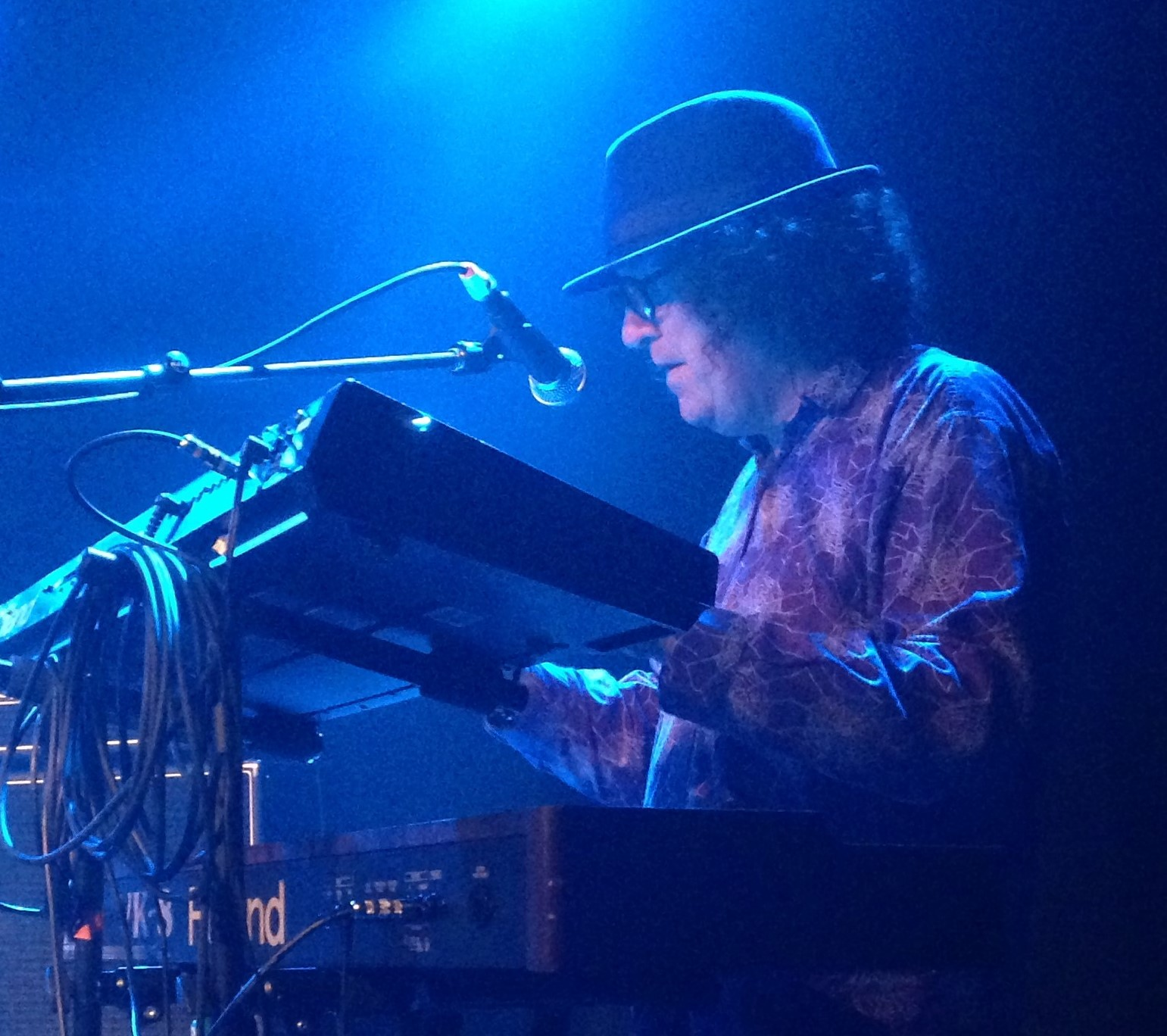
- Monty Oxymoron performing with the Damned in Copenhagen, 2014

Background information
- Born: Laurence Burrow; 27 September 1961 (age 64); Cambridge, England
- Genres: Rock; psychedelic rock; jazz
- Occupations: Musician, psychiatric nurse
- Instruments: Keyboards, drums, percussion
- Years active: 1980s–present
- Labels: Acid Tapes; Bendi

Monty Oxymoron (born Laurence Burrow; 27 September 1961 in Cambridge, England) is a keyboardist for the English punk rock group the Damned.

== Biography ==
His previous bands include Punk Floyd and Dr. Spacetoad Experience, with Captain Sensible. He released a few solo projects in the 1980s and 2000s. He joined the Damned in early 1996 and continues to tour and record with them. Monty also works as keyboardist and percussionist with the Sumerian Kyngs and as keyboardist with Tim Burness. He has spoken of love of psychedelic music, whose influence he claims to have heard in pre-Oxymoron Damned albums beginning with 1979's Machine Gun Etiquette. In 2007, along with Damned bandmate Sensible, he attended a memorial to Pink Floyd founder Syd Barrett.

In the 1980s, he trained as a psychiatric nurse and has worked as a nurse part time since then.

== Discography ==
=== Solo ===
- Acorn Beer and Chestnut Wine (1984, Acid Tapes) (as Monty the Moron)
- Tune into Channel Z (1984, Acid Tapes) (as Monty the Moron)
- Tales from the Second Attic (1984, Acid Tapes) (as Monty the Moron)
- Dr. Swastika Pumpanicle's Analysis (1986, Acid Tapes) (as Monty the Moron)
- Living My Life Backwards (2005, Oxymusic)
- 18 Symptoms of Musical Insanity (2006, Bendi) (as Monty the Moron)
- Mad Hatti's Reunion With Paradise (2007, Oxymusic)
- Visions of the Ecstasy Aunt (2010, Monty Oxymoron)

=== with Captain Sensible ===
- Mad Cows and Englishmen (1996, Scratch)

=== with The Dr. Spacetoad Experience ===
- Time Machine (1996, Blueprint)

=== with The Damned ===
- Grave Disorder (2001, Nitro)
- So, Who's Paranoid? (2008, The English Channel)
- Evil Spirits (2018, Search and Destroy / Spinefarm)
- The Rockfield Files (2020, Search and Destroy / Spinefarm)
- Darkadelic (2023, earMUSIC)
- Not Like Everybody Else (2026, earMUSIC)

=== with Sumerian Kyngs ===
- Post Art Pop Offensive (2016, 2Right Records)

=== Selected appearances ===
- Tim Burness – Finding New Ways To Love (2004, Expanding Consciousness)
- Gilli Bloodaxe – This is Bon Bon (2010, Bloodaxe)
- Portobello Shuffle: A Testimonial to Boss Goodman and Tribute to the Deviants & Pink Fairies (2010, Easy Action) – "Say You Love Me" (with Captain Sensible)
- The Madcap Laughs Again! (2010, MOJO Magazine free CD) – "Octopus" (with Captain Sensible)
- Spirits Burning and Michael Moorcock – An Alien Heat (2018, Gonzo Multimedia)
- Tim Burness – Interconnected (2018, Expanding Consciousness)
- Blu & Exile – Miles: From an Interlude Called Life (2020, Dirty Science)
- Spirits Burning – Evolution Ritual (2021, Noh Poetry)
