= Grave Disorder =

Studio album by the Damned
- Released: 21 August 2001
- Recorded: 2000–2001
- Studio: Mad Dog Studios, Burbank, California
- Genre: Punk rock
- Length: 57:35
- Label: Nitro
- Producer: David Bianco

The Damned chronology
Not of This Earth (1996)	Grave Disorder (2001)	So, Who's Paranoid? (2008)

Singles from Grave Disorder
- 1. "Democracy?" Released: July 2001

Professional ratings
Review scores
Source	Rating
AllMusic	3/5 stars
Kerrang!	4/5 stars
Pitchfork	3.8/10
PopMatters	favourable

Grave Disorder is the ninth studio album from the British punk rock band the Damned, released on 21 August 2001. It was their first studio album in six years, and their only full-length release on Nitro Records. Grave Disorder marked the return of guitarist Captain Sensible after a long absence, and is the band's only album with bassist Patricia Morrison.

== Background ==
The album is musically similar to Dave Vanian and Captain Sensible's previous Damned collaboration, Strawberries.

The album's name is taken from parliamentary convention in the United Kingdom, where a sitting may be adjourned should 'grave disorder' break out among members.

== Track listing ==
Songwriting credits adapted from the album's liner notes.

1. "Democracy?" (Captain Sensible) – 3:21
2. "song.com" (Sensible, David Vanian) – 3:39
3. "Thrill Kill" (Sensible, Pinch) – 5:37
4. "She" (Sensible, Vanian) – 4:27
5. "Lookin for Action" (Sensible, Vanian, Monty Oxy Moron, Patricia Morrison, Pinch) – 4:04
6. "Would You Be So Hot (If You Weren't Dead?)" (Sensible) – 4:13
7. "Absinthe" (Vanian) – 4:17
8. "Amen" (Sensible, Pinch) – 7:55
9. "Neverland" (Sensible) – 3:31
10. "'Til the End of Time" (Sensible) – 3:51
11. "Obscene" (Sensible, Vanian) – 2:46
12. "W" (Pinch, Tom Savage) – 5:05
13. "Beauty of the Beast" (Vanian, Oxy Moron) – 4:44

== Personnel ==
Credits adapted from the album's liner notes.

The Damned

- David Vanian – vocals, theremin
- Captain Sensible – guitar, backing vocals
- Patricia Morrison – bass guitar, backing vocals
- Monty Oxy Moron – keyboards, backing vocals
- Pinch – drums, backing vocals

Technical

- David Bianco – producer, mixing
- Eddy Schreyer – mastering
- Vince Ray – cover
- Morat – photography
