= The Damned (band) =

English rock band

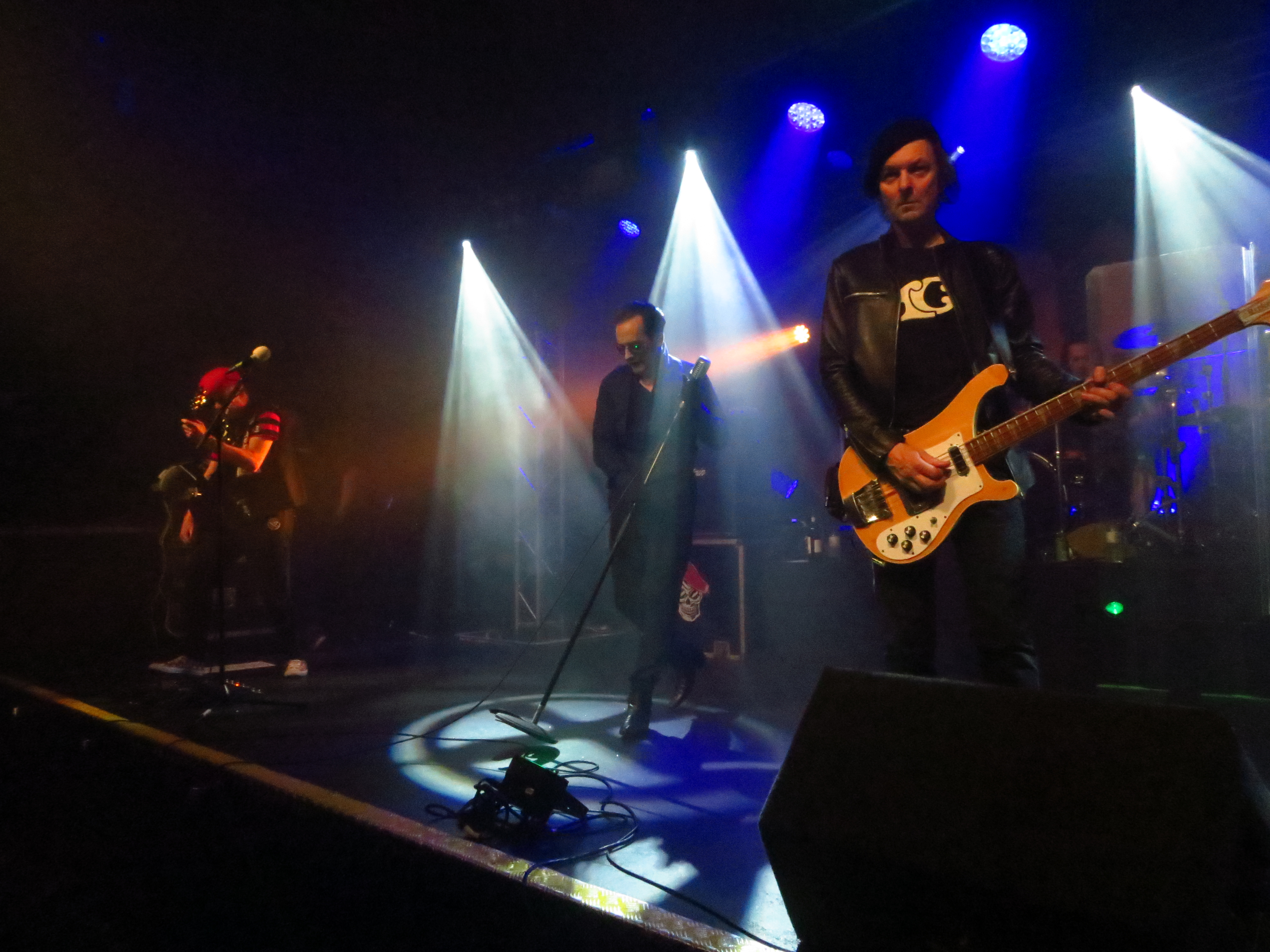
- The Damned on the Evil Spirits Tour 2018

Background information
- Origin: London, England
- Genres: Punk rock; gothic rock; post-punk; new wave; psychedelic pop
- Years active: 1976–1989; 1991–present
- Labels: Stiff; Chiswick; Bronze; Toshiba; Nitro; English Channel; MCA; Cleopatra; Spinefarm; earMUSIC
- Members: Dave Vanian; Captain Sensible; Rat Scabies; Paul Gray; Monty Oxymoron
- Past members: Brian James; Lu Edmonds; Jon Moss; Algy Ward; Roman Jugg; Bryn Merrick; Paul Shepley; Kris Dollimore; Spike T. Smith; Alan Lee Shaw; Moose Harris; Garrie Dreadful; Patricia Morrison; Stu West; Pinch; Will Taylor
- Website: officialdamned.com

The Damned are an English rock band formed in London in 1976 by lead vocalist Dave Vanian, guitarist Brian James, bassist (and later guitarist) Captain Sensible and drummer Rat Scabies. They were the first punk band from the United Kingdom to release a single, "New Rose" (1976), release a studio album, Damned Damned Damned (1977) and tour the United States. The band briefly dissolved after their second album, Music for Pleasure (1977), was critically dismissed. They re-formed without Brian James and released Machine Gun Etiquette (1979).

In the 1980s, they achieved success playing gothic and psychedelic rock, with nine of the band's singles charting in the UK singles chart top 40. That decade saw the release of four studio albums: The Black Album (1980), Strawberries (1982), Phantasmagoria (1985) and Anything (1986). The latter two albums did not feature Sensible, who had left the band in 1984. In 1988, James and Sensible rejoined to play a series of reunion gigs, one of which was released the next year as the live album Final Damnation (1989).

The Damned again re-formed for a tour in 1991. In 1995, a lineup with Vanian and Scabies released a new studio album, Not of This Earth, against Vanian's wishes, leading to Scabies' departure from the band for nearly thirty years. This was followed by the return of Captain Sensible, and the albums Grave Disorder (2001), So, Who's Paranoid? (2008) and Evil Spirits (2018), which was their first studio album in the Official Chartstop 10 list. and Darkadelic (2023), which also made the top 10. In November 2023, Scabies rejoined, and their 2026 covers album, Not Like Everybody Else, was the first Damned album to feature three members from the classic lineup in over forty years.

They have been recognised as influential in the development of numerous genres, including punk rock, gothic rock, and hardcore punk, as well as influential to popular bands that came after them.

== History ==
=== Formation and Stiff years (1976–1978) ===
Prior to The Damned, Dave Vanian (David Lett), Captain Sensible (Raymond Burns) and Rat Scabies (Chris Millar) had been members of the band Masters of the Backside, which also included future Pretenders frontwoman Chrissie Hynde. Brian James (Brian Robertson) had been a member of London SS, a band that never played live but also included musicians who later found fame in the Clash and Generation X. Scabies knew James through a failed audition as the drummer for London SS. When they decided to start their own band, with James on guitar and Scabies on drums, they invited Sid Vicious, later of the Sex Pistols, and Dave Vanian to audition to be the singer. However, only Vanian appeared, and he was added to the band. Sensible became the band's bassist, and the four called themselves the Damned. Chrissie Hynde would later write: "Without me, they were probably the most musically accomplished punk outfit in town."

The Damned played their first show on 6 July 1976, supporting the Sex Pistols at the 100 Club. A lo-fi recording of the show was later released as Live at the 100 Club (2007). As part of London's burgeoning punk scene, the Damned again played the club on 20 September for the 100 Club Punk Festival.

On 22 October, five weeks before the release of the Sex Pistols' "Anarchy in the U.K.", Stiff Records released the Damned's first single "New Rose", thus making them the first UK punk band to release a single. The single's B-side was a fast-paced cover of the Beatles' "Help!". "New Rose" was described by critic Ned Raggett as a "deathless anthem of nuclear-strength romantic angst."

When the Sex Pistols released their single, they took the Damned, along with the Clash and Johnny Thunders' Heartbreakers, as openers for their December "Anarchy Tour of the UK". Many of the tour dates were cancelled by organizers or local authorities, with only seven of approximately 20 scheduled shows taking place. The Damned were expelled from the tour before its end by Sex Pistols manager Malcolm McLaren.

The Damned released their debut studio album, Damned Damned Damned, on 18 February 1977. Produced by Nick Lowe, it was the first studio album released by a British punk band and included a new single, "Neat Neat Neat". The band toured to promote the album, in March opening for T. Rex on their final tour before Marc Bolan's death that September. Later that spring, they became the first British punk band to tour the United States.

That August, Lu Edmonds was added as a second guitarist. Although not yet obvious in their music, the band were heavily inspired by psychedelic rock. They unsuccessfully tried to recruit the reclusive Syd Barrett to produce their second studio album. They settled for his former Pink Floyd bandmate Nick Mason. In November 1977, the album was released as Music for Pleasure and was quickly dismissed by critics. Its failure precipitated the band's exit from Stiff Records. Scabies was also displeased with the album and quit the band after the recording. He was replaced by future Culture Club drummer Jon Moss, who played with the Damned until they dissolved in February 1978.

=== Re-formation and Machine Gun Etiquette (1978–1979) ===
The former members of the band worked on a series of brief side projects and solo recordings, all making little commercial impact. Scabies formed a one-off band called "Les Punks" for a late 1978 gig. Les Punks was a quasi-reunion of the Damned (without Brian James or Edmonds) that featured Scabies, Vanian, Sensible and bassist Lemmy of Hawkwind and Motörhead. The Damned tentatively re-formed with the "Les Punks" lineup in early 1979, but originally performed as "The Doomed" to avoid potential trademark problems. Sensible switched to guitar and keyboards, and after a brief period with Lemmy on bass for studio demos and a handful of live appearances and a slightly longer period with Henry Badowski on bass, the bassist position was filled by Algy Ward, formerly of the Saints. During a December 1978 tour of Scotland, Gary Holton substituted for Vanian.

The band officially went by the Damned again, playing their first gig under that name in April 1979 and signing a recording contract with Chiswick Records. They returned to the studio and released the charting singles "Love Song" and "Smash It Up", followed by 1979's Machine Gun Etiquette and then a cover version of Jefferson Airplane's "White Rabbit". Vanian's vocals had by now expanded from the high baritone of the early records to a smoother crooning style.

Machine Gun Etiquette (1979) featured a strong 1960s garage-rock influence with a Farfisa organ on several songs. Recording at London's Wessex Studios at the same time as the Clash were there to record London Calling (1979), Joe Strummer and Mick Jones made an uncredited vocal appearance on the title track. Machine Gun Etiquette (1979) received largely positive reviews; Ira Robbins and Jay Pattyn of Trouser Press described it as "a great record by a band many had already counted out."

After the release of the album, Ward left the band in 1979, to be replaced by Paul Gray, formerly of Eddie and the Hot Rods.

=== Shift towards gothic rock (1980–1989) ===
The Damned released The Black Album in 1980. Produced by the band themselves, apart from one track produced by Hans Zimmer, with three sides of the double album consisting of studio tracks, including the theatrical 17-minute song "Curtain Call". Side 4 featured a selection of live tracks recorded during a live performance at Shepperton Studios. A full version of this performance would later be released as Live Shepperton 1980 .

In 1981, the Damned released Friday 13th, a four-song EP that featured the original tracks "Disco Man", "Billy Bad Breaks", "Limit Club" and a cover version of the Rolling Stones song "Citadel".

In 1982, the Damned released their only studio album for Bronze Records, Strawberries. The band had now expanded to a quintet with the addition of full-time keyboardist Roman Jugg. At the time, Sensible was splitting his time between the Damned and his own solo career, having reached chart success in the UK with the 1982 number-one hit "Happy Talk". The band's next album, a one-off side project recorded without Sensible, was the soundtrack to an imaginary 1960s movie called Give Daddy the Knife, Cindy. For this limited-run album of 1960s cover songs, the band was billed as Naz Nomad and the Nightmares.

In 1984, the Damned performed on the BBC Two sitcom The Young Ones with their song "Nasty", featuring new bassist Bryn Merrick (replacing Gray) and both Jugg and Sensible on guitar. Sensible played his last concert with the band at Brockwell Park before leaving to pursue his solo career.

From the earliest days of the band, Vanian had adopted a vampire-like appearance onstage, with chalk-white makeup and formal dress. With Sensible gone, Vanian's image became more characteristic of the band as a whole. The Damned signed a recording contract with major label MCA Records, and the Phantasmagoria album followed in July 1985, preceded by the UK No. 21 single "Grimly Fiendish". Other hits from the same album were "The Shadow of Love" with a gloomy gothic sound, and the lighter "Is It a Dream?".

In January 1986, the non-album single "Eloise", a cover version of the 1968 hit by Barry Ryan, became a No. 3 chart success in the UK, the band's highest chart placing to date.

Phantasmagoria's December 1986 followup Anything was a commercial disappointment, although MCA included one of its tracks ("In Dulce Decorum") on the Miami Vice II soundtrack release. Late in 1987, the Damned began to work on another studio album for MCA, but the output of these sessions remains unreleased as the record contract was dissolved. Two of the new songs ("Gunning for Love" and "The Loveless and the Damned") were later rerecorded by the Dave Vanian and the Phantom Chords side project.

In June 1988, James and Sensible rejoined the group temporarily for three live appearances, including a concert at the London Town and Country Club that was released the following year as the album Final Damnation. They once again rejoined in June of 1989, for two UK appearances billed as The Final Curtain. This lineup performed a farewell tour of the U.S. and in December they performed a further five UK gigs advertised as the We Really Must Be Going Now tour.

=== Hiatus, second re-formation, and Not of This Earth (1990–1995) ===
Although officially on hiatus, the Damned released "Fun Factory", a song which was recorded in 1982 with the Sensible/Vanian/Scabies/Gray lineup and intended to be released as a single at that time. However, the bankruptcy of their record company prevented the release of the song for nine years, before becoming available in January 1991. That year's second single, "Prokofiev", was recorded by Scabies, Vanian and Brian James, and was sold on a 1991 reunion tour of the U.S.

In 1993, Scabies tried starting a new band with guitarist Kris Dollimore (formerly of the Godfathers). They could not find a singer, and instead decided to work with Vanian as a new incarnation of The Damned. This lineup also featured guitarist Alan Lee Shaw and bassist Moose Harris (formerly of New Model Army), and recorded the 1995 studio album Not of This Earth, which featured a guest appearance by Sex Pistols bassist Glen Matlock. However, the album was licensed for release by Scabies against Vanian's wishes, which lead to the end of this lineup. A live album from this era would later be released as Molten Lager.

=== Return of Captain Sensible and new lineup (1996–2019) ===
Sensible rejoined Vanian in 1996 and yet another formation of the Damned appeared. This initially featured bassist Paul Gray, who was later replaced by Patricia Morrison, previously of Bags, the Gun Club and The Sisters of Mercy. By February 1999, the Damned consisted of Vanian, Sensible, Morrison and new recruits Monty Oxymoron on keyboards and Spike T. Smith on drums. Smith later joined Morrissey's live band and recommended that the Damned recruit Andy (Pinch) Pinching, a founding member of English Dogs, to replace him on drums. Garrie Dreadful, a recruit from Sensible's solo band, had played drums from 1997 to 1999 before Smith's arrival. In 2001, the band released the album Grave Disorder on Dexter Holland's Nitro Records label and promoted it with continual touring. A spring tour of the U.S. was planned in 2002 supporting Rob Zombie. However, the band withdrew after a few shows. Sensible said that "gothic punk was completely lost on the predominantly metal crowds." In the summer, the band played the Vans Warped Tour in the U.S.

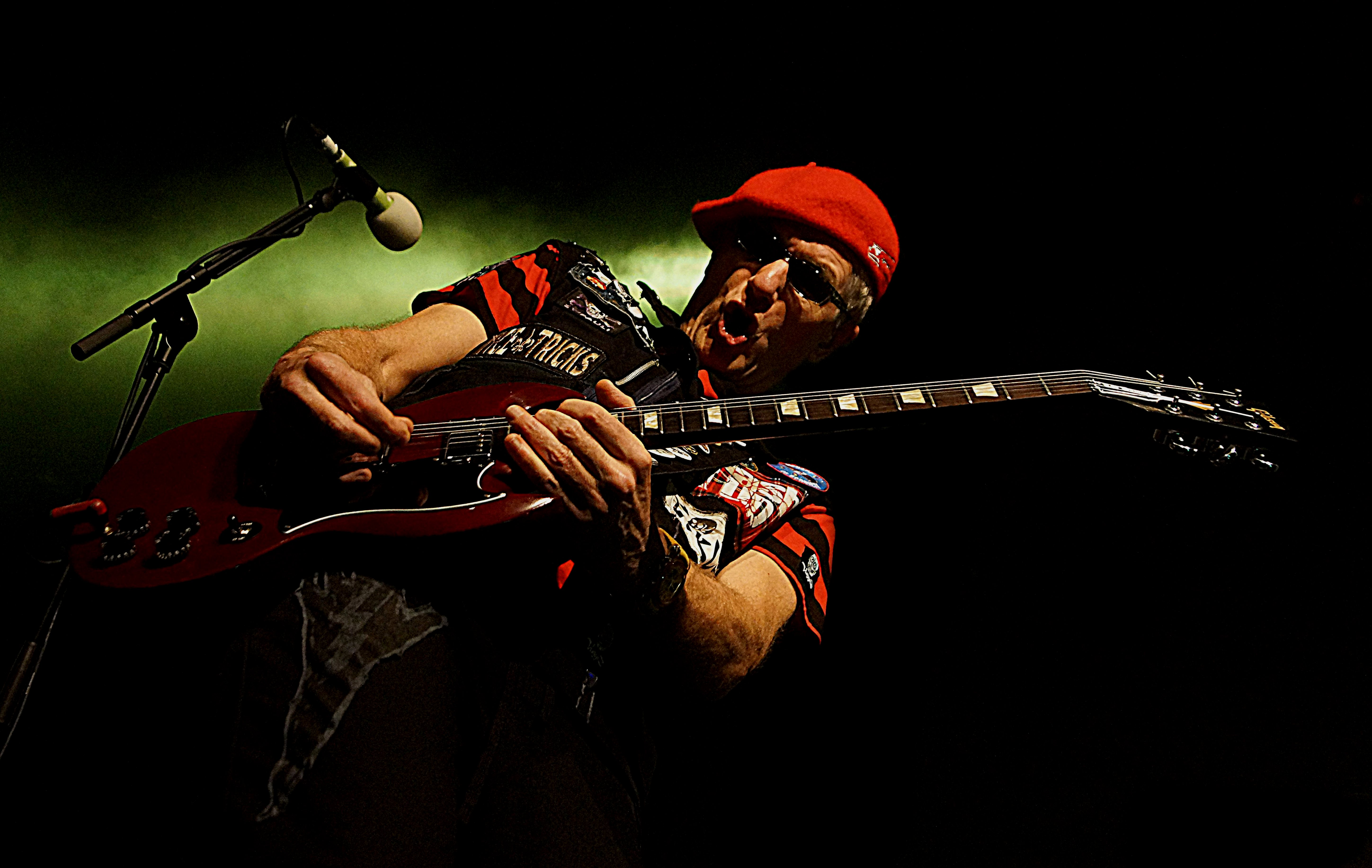
Captain Sensible of the Damned performing live at the Manchester Academy, 2018

Morrison and Vanian married and had a daughter, Emily, born on 9 February 2004. Around this time, Morrison retired from performing with the band, although she remained involved with the Damned as their manager. Her replacement on bass was Stu West.

In 2006, the Damned released the single "Little Miss Disaster" and a live DVD MGE25 documenting a 2004 Manchester concert celebrating the 25th anniversary of Machine Gun Etiquette (1979). On 21 October 2006, BBC Radio 2 broadcast an hour-long documentary titled Is She Really Going Out with Him? concerning the recording of the Damned's first single "New Rose" and the group's place in the 1976 London punk scene. Featuring interviews with James, Sensible, Scabies, Glen Matlock, Don Letts and Chrissie Hynde, the programme discussed the bands and personalities around the scene, particularly the Anarchy in the U.K. tour.

On 28 October 2008, the Damned released their tenth studio album, So, Who's Paranoid?, a digital release, followed by a physical release on the English Channel label on 10 November (UK) and 9 December (U.S.). To promote the album, the band appeared twice on American television, including a visit to The Late Late Show with Craig Ferguson. The band undertook a 23-date UK tour to promote their new studio album, supported by Devilish Presley and Slicks Kitchen.

In November 2009, the band supported Motörhead on the UK leg of their world tour.

Continual touring occurred throughout the UK and Europe over the next few years. In 2012, the Damned played South America for the first time, with dates in São Paulo and Buenos Aires. They returned to the Rhythm Festival, one of only four headline acts to return over the festival's seven-year history. In 2012, the Damned announced that they would return for 2013's Rebellion Festival alongside the Exploited, the Casualties and others.

In 2015, the Damned were featured in a documentary by director Wes Orshoski titled The Damned: Don't You Wish That We Were Dead. The documentary charts the history of the band against a backdrop of archival footage, new interviews and tour footage from 2011 to 2014. After the release of the film on 12 September 2015, former bassist Bryn Merrick, who had played on Phantasmagoria (1985) and Anything (1986), died of throat cancer. In May 2016, the band played a 40th anniversary show at the Royal Albert Hall.

In the summer of 2017, "Neat Neat Neat" was prominently featured in the action film Baby Driver and its soundtrack. On 11 September 2017, the band announced that Stu West was leaving the band and that former bassist Paul Gray would be returning for the new studio album. Evil Spirits, the band's eleventh album and first in ten years, was released on 13 April 2018. It peaked at No. 7 on the UK Albums Chart, their highest-ever chart position, topping their previous high of No. 11 in 1985 (Phantasmagoria). The album, which was largely crowdfunded through PledgeMusic, was recorded in November 2017 in New York City and was produced by Tony Visconti. The album was preceded by the first single, "Standing on the Edge of Tomorrow", in January 2018 along with the singles "Devil in Disguise" and "Look Left" in March 2018 and "Procrastination" in April 2018.

On 23 May 2019, the Damned started a tour performing their third studio album, Machine Gun Etiquette (1979), which they had not played in full since its release. The tour included venues such as the House of Blues, Punk Rock Bowling and Music Festival and Rebellion Festival.

=== Departure of Pinch and Scabies' return (2019–present) ===
On 25 October 2019, Pinch announced his departure after 20 years with the band. His last gig was the Damned's show at the London Palladium on 27 October 2019.

On 21 October 2020, the Damned announced that in 2021 the original lineup of Vanian, Sensible, James and Scabies would play a series of shows. This would mark the first time in more than two decades that James and Scabies had played with Vanian and Sensible. However, the COVID-19 pandemic forced the postponement of the tour until 2022.

In February 2022, Pinch was replaced by drummer Will Taylor. In February 2023, the band's next studio album, Darkadelic, was announced and it was released on 28 April 2023. The album was preceded by the singles and music videos for "The Invisible Man" on 3 February 2023, "Beware of the Clown" on 10 March 2023 and "You're Gonna Realise" on 21 April 2023. All three music videos were directed by Martin Gooch.

Former bassist Algy Ward, who had played on Machine Gun Etiquette, died on 17 May 2023.

Will Taylor announced his departure as the Damned's drummer in November 2023. Later that month, it was announced that original drummer Scabies had rejoined the band on a permanent basis.

Founding member and original guitarist Brian James died on 6 March 2025.

In January 2026, with Scabies, they released Not Like Everybody Else, a covers album of songs that had inspired them and Brian James in their youth. To celebrate the release, they played exclusive headline shows in Manchester and Paris. A third show in Cologne was cancelled at short notice after Dave Vanian lost his voice.

== Legacy and influence ==
Author Ian Winwood wrote, "In terms of placing boots on the ground, it is The Damned who can be credited as having had the most influence on American punk rock." Their fast-driven punk rock has been cited for influencing and shaping the emergence of hardcore punk in the late 1970s and early 1980s in the United Kingdom and the United States. Bad Brains, who helped kick start Washington, D.C. hardcore, have cited The Damned as an influence as have other musicians from the first wave of D.C. hardcore, such as members of Government Issue, Scream, and Minor Threat. Henry Rollins of Black Flag and Rollins Band has stated he's listened to Machine Gun Etiquette every Friday, dating back to his high school days in Washington.

According to Brendan Mullen, founder of the Los Angeles club the Masque, their first tour of the U.S. found them favouring very fast tempos, helping to inspire the first wave of West Coast American hardcore punk. John Doe of X said of seeing this tour, "When we saw them live, we realized, ‘Oh, you can do that. You can be that fucking crazy and loud and wonderful.’” Jack Grisham of T.S.O.L. has credited the band as one of the first punk groups he started listening to. Steven Blush's book American Hardcore: A Tribal History, cited in particular T.S.O.L.'s shift from punk to gothic rock as being influenced by The Damned, and they later covered "Politics" on their album Live from Long Beach.

Several other prominent groups have covered Damned songs: Guns N' Roses recorded "New Rose" for their 1993 album The Spaghetti Incident?, while The Offspring covered "Smash It Up" for the Batman Forever soundtrack in 1995, and "Wait for the Blackout" was covered by the Goo Goo Dolls on the Tommy Boy soundtrack in 1995, as well as Alkaline Trio on BYO Split Series Volume V in 2004. "Neat, Neat, Neat" has been covered live by Billie Joe Armstrong and Mike Dirnt's Green Day side project The Coverups, and Pennywise included the song on an Apple Music playlist titled "Songs that Influenced Us".

As one of the first gothic rock bands, the Damned, particularly Dave Vanian's baritone singing, dark lyrics and vampire-themed costume, were a major influence on the goth subculture, and Davey Havok from AFI, has credited Vanian as a vocal influence. Joe Principe of Rise Against credits his bass playing as being influenced by The Damned, and Rise Against guitarist Zac Blair has called The Damned "the best punk group ever". C.J. Ramone cited The Damned as his favourite U.K. punk band, while Johnny Ramone put them #6 on his "Top-Ten Punk Groups" list.

Damned Damned Damned has been listed on Consequence of Sound's "10 Punk Debuts Every Music Fan Should Own", #6 on Radio X's "25 greatest Indie Debut Albums of the 1970s", #6 on OC Weekly's "10 Punk Albums to Listen to Before You Die", #13 on The Daily Telegraph's "50 best punk albums of all time", and #90 on Rolling Stone's "100 Greatest Punk Albums of All Time". While Machine Gun Etiquette was listed as #4 on GQ's "Best British Punk Albums", #28 on Rolling Stone's "50 Greatest Pop-Punk Albums", and #45 on Revolver's "50 Greatest Punk Albums", The i Paper listed both albums, along with Music for Pleasure, on their "40 essential punk records" list.

== Members ==
Current members

- David Vanian (David Lett) – lead vocals (1976–present)
- Captain Sensible (Raymond Burns) – guitars, backing vocals (1979–1984, 1988–1992, 1996–present), keyboards (1979–1984), bass (1976–1978; 2022 reunion tour)
- Rat Scabies (Christopher Millar) – drums, backing vocals (1976–1977, 1979–1996, 2022, 2023–present)
- Paul Gray – bass, backing vocals (1980–1983, 1989–1992, 1996, 2017–present)
- Monty Oxymoron (Laurence Burrow) – keyboards, backing vocals (1996–present)

== Discography ==
- Damned Damned Damned (1977)
- Music for Pleasure (1977)
- Machine Gun Etiquette (1979)
- The Black Album (1980)
- Strawberries (1982)
- Phantasmagoria (1985)
- Anything (1986)
- Not of This Earth (1995)
- Grave Disorder (2001)
- So, Who's Paranoid? (2008)
- Evil Spirits (2018)
- Darkadelic (2023)
- Not Like Everybody Else (2026)
