= Rat Scabies =

English musician (born 1955)

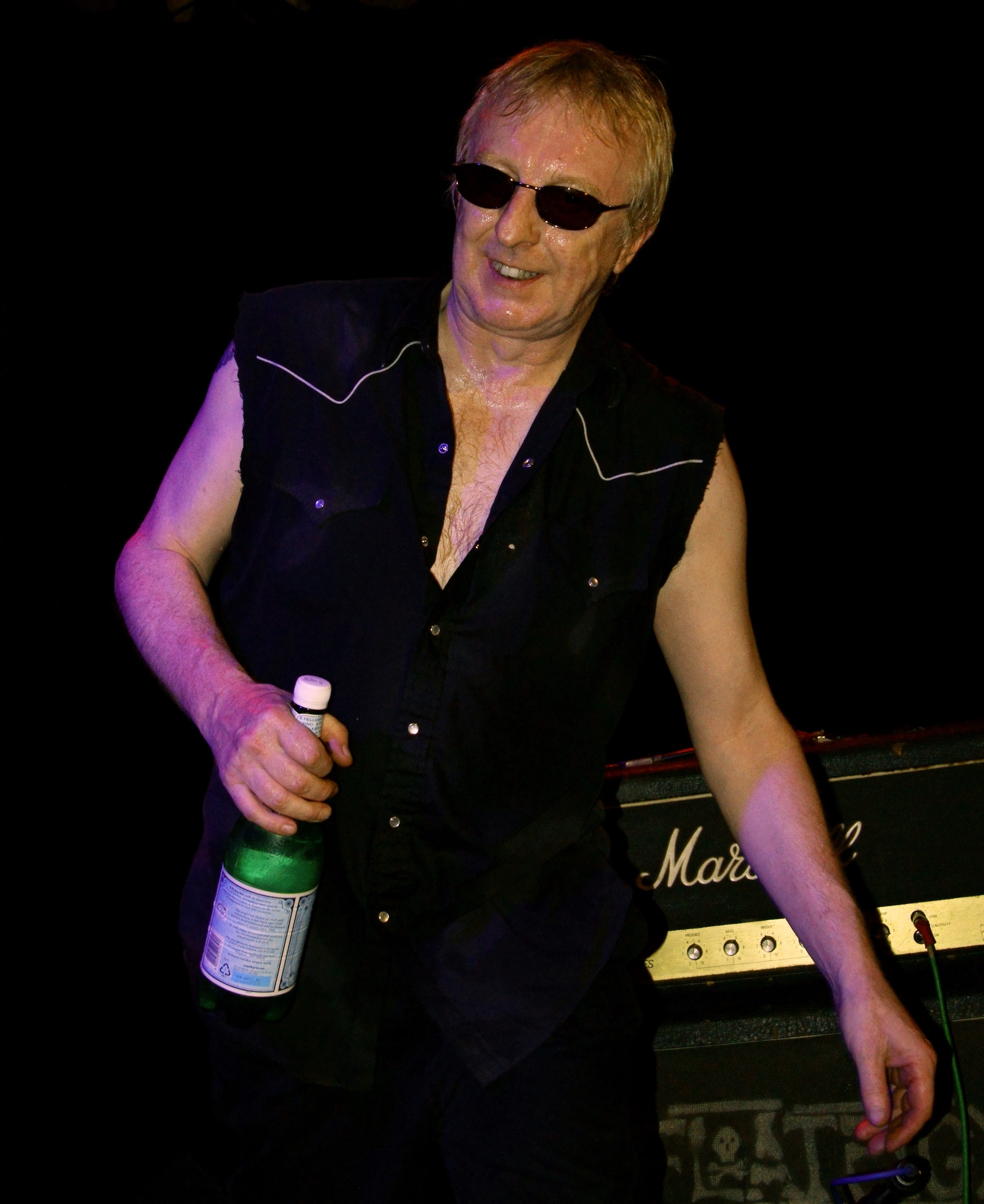
- Scabies in 2012

Background information
- Also known as: Rat Scabies
- Born: Christopher Millar; 30 July 1955 (age 71)
- Origin: Kingston upon Thames, Surrey, England
- Genres: Punk rock; new wave; gothic rock; post-punk
- Occupations: Musician, producer
- Instrument: Drums
- Years active: 1976–present
- Label: None

Christopher John Millar (born 30 July 1955), known by his stage name Rat Scabies, is a musician and the drummer for English punk rock band the Damned.

== Career ==
Millar was born in Kingston upon Thames, Surrey. He played drums with progressive rock outfit Tor and London SS before founding the Damned with Brian James, Dave Vanian and Captain Sensible in 1976. In his audition for London SS, he obtained the nickname Rat Scabies after he was suffering from scabies when a rat ran across the basement floor.

The Damned played their first gig supporting the Sex Pistols, and later released the first punk single in the UK, "New Rose". Scabies played with the Damned with some interruptions and alongside various personnel changes until a dispute over the release of the album Not of This Earth led to his departure in 1995.

His solo work outside the Damned includes a cover version of Bob Dylan's "This Wheel's on Fire", credited to "Rat & The Whale". In 2003 Millar formed a short-lived outfit called the Germans with Peter Coyne and Kris Dollimore, originally from the Godfathers. He has also played with Donovan, Nosferatu, ska artist Neville Staple (formerly of the Specials) and his band, Dave Catching (Eagles of Death Metal), Chris Goss, the Members, the Mutants, the Spammed, Urban Voodoo Machine and Jane Horrocks. He has also worked as a producer, including with Flipron and Ebony Bones. In May 2018 he released his solo album P.H.D. (Prison, Hospital, Debt).

On 17 November 2023, the Damned announced that Scabies had returned as a permanent member. In February 2024 The Damned announced that, for the first time in 35 years, they would be doing a ten-date North American tour featuring their 1980s lineup of Scabies, Dave Vanian, Captain Sensible and Paul Gray.

== Personal life ==
Millar is the central character of the book Rat Scabies and The Holy Grail, written by former music journalist Christopher Dawes. The book was published in May 2005 and is billed as "A road trip, a rich historical yarn, and testimony to the odd nature of a great many friendships".

== Equipment ==
Scabies uses vintage Leedy & George Hayman drum kits. Over the years he has played various brands, starting with a John Grey 'Autocrat' kit in turquoise sparkle finish, before playing a black Pearl Maxwin kit (early 1970s to 1976), a white Pearl kit (late 1976–1981), a white Premier 'Resonator' kit (1982–1983), a Premier 'Black Shadow' kit (1984–1985), then a Premier 'Resonator' in piano black finish (1985–1996).

== Discography ==
=== Albums ===
- Lord of the Flies (Nosferatu with Rat Scabies) (1998, Cleopatra Records (U.S.A & Canada, Hades Records (U.K. & Europe)
- Spiteful (Sonny Vincent & Spite Featuring Rat Scabies, Glen Matlock, Steve Mackay) (2014, Still Unbeatable Records)
- P.H.D. (Prison, Hospital, Debt) (2018, Cleopatra)

=== Singles ===
- "Wheels On Fire" (as The Rat and The Whale) (1980, 7", Single)
- "Millionaire" (Magic Michael with Rat Scabies & Captain Sensible) (1980, 7", Single)
- "Let There Be Rats" (1984, 7", Single)
- "Mary Ann" (Sonny Vincent & Spite Feat. Rat Scabies, Glen Matlock & Steve Mackay) (2015)
- "Chew On You" (2018, Cleopatra)
