= David Vanian =

British singer

Dave Vanian
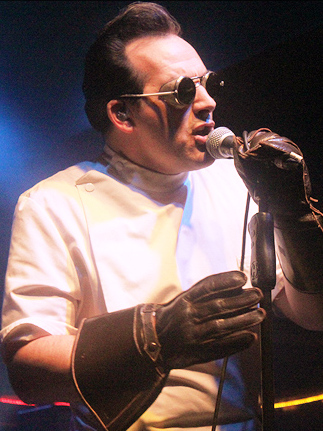
- Vanian performing live with the Damned in 2011

Background information
- Born: David Lett; 12 October 1956 (age 69); Newcastle upon Tyne, Tyne and Wear, England
- Origin: Hemel Hempstead, Hertfordshire, England
- Genres: Punk rock; gothic rock; gothabilly
- Occupations: Singer; songwriter; musician; gravedigger
- Instruments: Vocals; keyboards; guitar; tambourine
- Years active: 1976–present
- Labels: Nitro; Big Beat; Raw Power
- Member of: The Damned
- Formerly of: Dave Vanian and the Phantom Chords; Masters of the Backside; Naz Nomad and the Nightmares
- Website: officialdamned.com

David Vanian (born David Lett, 12 October 1956) is an English rock musician, and lead singer of the punk rock band the Damned. Formed in 1976 in London, the Damned were the first British punk band to release a single, release an album, have a record hit the UK charts, and tour the United States. With a fluid line-up since their founding, Vanian has been the only ever-present member. Vanian's baritone singing voice, dark lyrics and vampire-themed costumes, were a major influence on the goth subculture.

== Career ==
Born in Newcastle upon Tyne, North East England, Vanian moved with his parents to Hemel Hempstead, Hertfordshire when he was a couple of months old. Vanian changed his name from Lett to Vanian in early life after a stint as a gravedigger – Vanian being a play on "Transylvanian". He is one of the early influencers of gothic fashion, wearing dark and otherworldly clothing both on stage and off. In November 1976, the British music magazine NME stated that Vanian "resembles a runaway from the Addams Family".

In 1978, he was guest in the song "Don't Panic England", from the band Doctors of Madness.

In 2004, he and fellow Damned member Captain Sensible turned on the Christmas lights in Cambridge.

Vanian sang with MC5 for their 40th anniversary singing "Looking at You", which was released as part of Revolution: A Celebration of the MC5. In 2008, Vanian with the band the Throb, performed on "Let's Get Lost (Sailor Jerry's Story)" for the compilation album, The Original Sailor Jerry Rum – Music To.... Outside of the Damned, Vanian has led the gothabilly band Dave Vanian and the Phantom Chords, hosted Dave Vanian's Dark Screen on the UK-based television channel Rockworld TV and composed the soundtrack for the 2009 film, The Perfect Sleep.

== Personal life ==
Vanian married Patricia Morrison in Las Vegas in 1996, after the Damned had toured Australia.

== Discography ==
Studio album

- David Vanian and the Phantom Chords (1995)
