= Black Is the Night: The Definitive Anthology =

2019 album

Black is the Night: The Definitive Anthology

Compilation album by The Damned
- Released: 1 November 2019
- Recorded: 1976–2019
- Genre: Punk rock; gothic rock; post-punk
- Length: 2:35:28
- Language: English
- Label: BMG

The Damned chronology
Evil Spirits (2018)	Black is the Night: The Definitive Anthology (2019)	The Rockfield Files (2020)

Professional ratings
Review scores
Source	Rating
AllMusic	4/5 stars

Black is the Night: The Definitive Anthology is a 2-CD, career-spanning compilation album by the British punk rock band the Damned, released on 1 November 2019. It collects tracks from most of the band's studio albums between 1977 and 2018, as well as selected non-album singles and B-sides. It also includes the new track "Black Is the Night". Of the band's eleven studio albums to date, Not of This Earth (1995) and So, Who's Paranoid? (2008) are not represented on the anthology. All tracks were chosen by the band themselves, and sequenced thematically instead of chronologically.

== Reception ==
AllMusic felt that "the track listing does make sense of the often elusive through line of the Damned's history, as Dave Vanian's showman's vocals, Captain Sensible's clever melodies, and their smarter-than-you-think wit unites the music as they travel from punk to garage rock to hard rock to pop to goth to a few pit stops in between." AllMusic noted that the inclusion of some of the band's more recent material "shows they're still in touch with their various muses, and for all their sonic shape-shifting, this is a far more consistent listening experience than one would expect."

With no tracks represented from Not Of This Earth and So, Who's Paranoid?, the Big Takeover wrote that the anthology was "not fully representative" and "omissions from these albums is questionable."

== Track listing ==
Disc one

No.	Title	Writer(s)	Place of Origin	Length
1.	"Love Song"	Rat Scabies, Captain Sensible, Dave Vanian, Algy Ward	Machine Gun Etiquette, 1979	2:21
2.	"Wait for the Blackout"	Scabies, Sensible, Vanian, Paul Gray, Billy Karloff	The Black Album, 1980	3:51
3.	"Generals"	Scabies, Sensible, Vanian, Gray	Strawberries, 1982	3:23
4.	"I Just Can't Be Happy Today"	Scabies, Sensible, Vanian, Ward, Giovanni Dadomo	Machine Gun Etiquette	3:43
5.	"Bad Time for Bonzo"	Scabies, Sensible, Vanian, Gray	Strawberries	3:48
6.	"Democracy?"	Sensible	Grave Disorder, 2001	3:21
7.	"White Rabbit"	Grace Slick	Non-album single, 1980	3:17
8.	"Anti-Pope"	Scabies, Sensible, Vanian, Ward, Phillip Burns	Machine Gun Etiquette	3:21
9.	"Ignite"	Scabies, Sensible, Vanian, Gray	Strawberries	4:52
10.	"Melody Lee"	Scabies, Sensible, Vanian, Ward	Machine Gun Etiquette	2:07
11.	"Smash It Up Pt 1 & 2"	Scabies, Sensible, Vanian, Ward	Machine Gun Etiquette	5:13
12.	"New Rose"	Brian James	Damned Damned Damned, 1977	2:42
13.	"Neat Neat Neat"	James	Damned Damned Damned	2:40
14.	"Stretcher Case Baby"	James, Scabies	Non-album single, 1977	2:12
15.	"Sick of Being Sick"	James	B-side to "Stretcher Case Baby", 1977	2:29
16.	"Born to Kill"	James	Damned Damned Damned	2:35
17.	"Rabid (Over You)"	Scabies, Sensible, Vanian, Andy Le Vien	B-side to "White Rabbit", 1980	3:41
18.	"Problem Child"	James, Scabies	Music for Pleasure, 1977	2:12
19.	"1 of the 2"	James	Damned Damned Damned	3:06
20.	"So Messed Up"	James	Damned Damned Damned	1:50
21.	"Machine Gun Etiquette"	Scabies, Sensible, Vanian, Ward	Machine Gun Etiquette	1:48
22.	"Disco Man"	Scabies, Sensible, Vanian, Gray	Friday 13th EP, 1981	3:19
23.	"Fan Club"	James	Damned Damned Damned	2:55
24.	"Suicide"	Scabies, Sensible, Vanian, Ward	B-side to "Love Song", 1979	3:16
Total length:				1:14:16

Disc two

No.	Title	Writer(s)	Place of Origin	Length
1.	"Eloise"	Paul Ryan	Non-album single, 1986	5:08
2.	"Plan 9 Channel 7"	Scabies, Sensible, Vanian, Ward	Machine Gun Etiquette	5:08
3.	"Grimly Fiendish"	Vanian, Scabies, Roman Jugg, Bryn Merrick, Clive Jackson	Phantasmagoria, 1985	3:49
4.	"The Shadow of Love" (10 Inches of Hell Mix)	Vanian, Scabies, Jugg, Merrick	Phantasmagoria	6:33
5.	"Dr Jekyll and Mr Hyde"	Scabies, Sensible, Gray, Vanian, Dadomo	The Black Album	4:32
6.	"Street of Dreams"	Vanian, Scabies, Jugg, Merrick	Phantasmagoria	5:36
7.	"The History of the World (Part 1)"	Scabies, Sensible, Gray, Vanian	The Black Album	3:49
8.	"Curtain Call"	Scabies, Sensible, Gray, Vanian	The Black Album	17:10
9.	"Alone Again Or"	Bryan MacLean	Anything, 1986	3:28
10.	"Lively Arts"	Scabies, Sensible, Gray, Vanian	The Black Album	2:55
11.	"Standing on the Edge of Tomorrow"	Vanian	Evil Spirits, 2018	4:14
12.	"Stranger on the Town"	Scabies, Sensible, Gray, Vanian	Strawberries	5:13
13.	"Fun Factory"	Sensible	Non-album single, 1991; recorded 1982	4:21
14.	"Under the Floor Again"	Scabies, Sensible, Gray, Vanian	Strawberries	5:21
15.	"Black Is the Night"	Vanian	New track	4:09
Total length:				1:21:37

== Personnel ==
Credits adapted from the liner notes of the original albums and singles, except where noted.

The Damned

- Dave Vanian – vocals, synthesizer (disc two: 15)
- Captain Sensible – bass, backing vocals (disc one: 12–16, 18–20, 23); guitar, keyboards, backing vocals (disc one: 1–11, 17, 21, 22, 24 / disc two: 2, 5, 7, 8, 10–15)
- Rat Scabies – drums, backing vocals (disc one: 1–5, 7–24 / disc two: 1–10, 12–14)
- Brian James – guitar, backing vocals (disc one: 12–16, 18–20, 23)
- Lu Edmonds – guitar (disc one: 18)
- Algy Ward – bass (disc one: 1, 4, 8, 10, 11, 21, 24 / disc two: 2)
- Paul Gray – bass (disc one: 2, 3, 5, 7, 9, 22 / disc two: 5, 7, 8, 10–15)
- Roman Jugg – keyboard solos (disc one: 3, 5, 9 / disc two: 12, 14); guitar, keyboards, backing vocals (disc two: 1, 3, 4, 6, 9)
- Bryn Merrick – bass, backing vocals (disc two: 1, 3, 4, 6, 9)
- Monty Oxymoron – keyboards, backing vocals (disc one: 6 / disc two: 11, 15)
- Patricia Morrison – bass, backing vocals (disc one: 6)
- Pinch – drums, backing vocals (disc one: 6 / disc two: 11, 15)

Additional musicians

- Simon Lloyd – brass (disc one: 3)
- Anthony More – synthesizer (disc one: 17)
- Gary Barnacle – saxophone, brass (disc two: 3, 6)
- Ray Martinez – trumpet (disc two: 5)
- Luís Jardim – percussion (disc two: 6)
- Hans Zimmer – synthesizer (disc two: 7, 10)
- Kurt Holm – trumpet (disc two: 9)
- Robert Fripp – guitar (disc two: 13)

Technical

- Nick Lowe – producer (disc one: 12–16, 19, 20, 23)
- Nick Mason – producer (disc one: 18)
- Shel Talmy – producer (disc one: 14, 15)
- The Damned – producer (disc one: 1–5, 7–11, 17, 21 / disc two: 2, 3, 5, 7, 8, 10, 12, 14)
- Roger Armstrong – producer (disc one: 1, 4, 7, 8, 10, 11, 21 / disc two: 2)
- Ed Hollis – producer (disc one: 24)
- Hans Zimmer – producer (disc two: 7)
- Tony Mansfield – producer (disc one: 22)
- Hugh Jones – producer (disc one: 5, 9)
- Jon Kelly – producer (disc two: 1, 4, 6, 9)
- Bob Sargeant – producer (disc two: 3)
- Captain Sensible – producer (disc two: 13)
- David Bianco – producer (disc one: 6)
- Tony Visconti – producer (disc two: 11)
- Tom Dalgety – producer (disc two: 15)
- Phil Smee – cover, artwork
- Ben Thomas – layout
- Eugene Butcher – liner notes
- Neil Brabiner – photography
- Dod Morrison – photography

== Charts ==
Chart (2019)	Peak position
UK Albums (OCC)	63
