= Smash It Up: The Anthology 1976–1987 =

Compilation album by The Damned
- Released: 22 October 2002
- Recorded: 1976–1986
- Genre: Punk rock, gothic rock
- Length: 133:32
- Label: Essential, Castle, Sanctuary

The Damned chronology
| Live Anthology (2002) | Smash It Up: The Anthology 1976–1987 (2002) | The Stiff Singles 1976–1977 (2002) |

Smash It Up: The Anthology 1976–1987 is a compilation album by the English punk and gothic rock band the Damned, released on 22 October 2002. It collects tracks spanning the first eleven years of the band's career, beginning with their debut single "New Rose" (1976) and continuing through their first seven studio albums—Damned Damned Damned (1977), Music for Pleasure (1977), Machine Gun Etiquette (1979), The Black Album (1980), Strawberries (1982), Phantasmagoria (1985), and Anything (1986)—along with the non-album singles "Stretcher Case Baby" (1977), "Lovely Money" (1982), and "Eloise" (1986).

== Reception ==
Mark Deming of AllMusic gave the compilation four stars out of five, saying that it succeeds "for the most part" in presenting a coherent picture of the Damned's initial run, and that the chronologically ordered tracking portrays the group as "constantly growing and evolving, mutating from speed-addled punk marauders into a surprisingly radio-friendly blend of pop, goth, and hard rock at journey's end." While criticizing the inclusion of the 17-minute "Curtain Call" as desirable only to rabid fans, he remarked "this collection not only serves the band's history quite well, but also the evolution of their profile in the world of music from upstarts to veterans of the pop charts."

== Track listing ==
Disc 1
| No. | Title | Writer(s) | Length |
|---|---|---|---|
| 1. | "New Rose" (from "New Rose", 1976, included on Damned, Damned Damned, 1977) | Brian James | 2:42 |
| 2. | "Help!" (from "New Rose", 1976, included on Hits Greatest Stiffs by Various Artists, 1977; originally performed by The Beatles) | John Lennon, Paul McCartney | 1:44 |
| 3. | "Neat Neat Neat" (from Damned Damned Damned, 1977) | James | 2:44 |
| 4. | "See Her Tonite" (from Damned Damned Damned, 1977) | James | 2:31 |
| 5. | "Fan Club" (from Damned Damned Damned, 1977) | James | 2:58 |
| 6. | "I Fall" (from Damned Damned Damned, 1977) | James | 2:07 |
| 7. | "I Feel Alright" (from Damned Damned Damned, 1977; originally performed by The Stooges as "1970") | Dave Alexander, Ron Asheton, Scott Asheton, Iggy Pop | 4:29 |
| 8. | "Feel the Pain" (from Damned Damned Damned, 1977) | James | 3:39 |
| 9. | "Stretcher Case Baby" (from "Stretcher Case Baby", 1977, included on Music for Pleasure, 1977) | Rat Scabies | 2:16 |
| 10. | "Problem Child" (from Music for Pleasure, 1977) | James, Scabies | 2:15 |
| 11. | "Don't Cry Wolf" (from Music for Pleasure, 1977) | James | 3:15 |
| 12. | "Your Eyes" (from Music for Pleasure, 1977) | James, Dave Vanian | 2:53 |
| 13. | "Creep (You Can't Fool Me)" (from Music for Pleasure, 1977) | James | 2:17 |
| 14. | "Idiot Box" (from Music for Pleasure, 1977) | Scabies, Captain Sensible | 4:56 |
| 15. | "Love Song" (from Machine Gun Etiquette, 1979) | Scabies, Sensible, Vanian, Algy Ward | 2:06 |
| 16. | "Smash It Up (Part 1)" (from Machine Gun Etiquette, 1979) | Scabies, Sensible, Vanian, Ward | 1:59 |
| 17. | "Smash It Up (Part 2)" (from Machine Gun Etiquette, 1979) | Scabies, Sensible, Vanian, Ward | 2:55 |
| 18. | "Machine Gun Etiquette" (from Machine Gun Etiquette, 1979) | Scabies, Sensible, Vanian, Ward | 1:51 |
| 19. | "Melody Lee" (from Machine Gun Etiquette, 1979) | Scabies, Sensible, Vanian, Ward | 2:08 |
| 20. | "Plan 9, Channel 7" (from Machine Gun Etiquette, 1979) | Scabies, Sensible, Vanian, Ward | 5:13 |
| 21. | "I Just Can't Be Happy Today" (from Machine Gun Etiquette, 1979) | Scabies, Sensible, Vanian, Ward, Giovanni Dadomo | 3:40 |
| Total length: | | | 59:58 |

Disc 2
| No. | Title | Writer(s) | Length |
|---|---|---|---|
| 1. | "The History of the World (Part 1)" (from The Black Album, 1980) | Scabies, Sensible, Vanian, Ward | 3:59 |
| 2. | "Wait for the Blackout" (from The Black Album, 1980) | Scabies, Sensible, Vanian, Paul Gray, Billy Karloff | 4:00 |
| 3. | "Drinking About My Baby" (from The Black Album, 1980) | Scabies, Sensible, Vanian, Gray | 3:05 |
| 4. | "Silly Kids Games" (from The Black Album, 1980) | Scabies, Sensible, Vanian, Gray | 2:39 |
| 5. | "Curtain Call" (from The Black Album, 1980) | Scabies, Sensible, Vanian. Gray | 17:17 |
| 6. | "Lovely Money" (from "Lovely Money", 1982) | Scabies, Sensible, Vanian, Gray, Randy MacDonald | 5:26 |
| 7. | "Dozen Girls" (from Strawberries, 1982) | Scabies, Sensible, Vanian, Gray, Karloff | 4:22 |
| 8. | "Life Goes On" (from Strawberries, 1982) | Scabies, Sensible, Vanian | 4:11 |
| 9. | "Under the Floor Again" (from Strawberries, 1982) | Scabies, Sensible, Vanian | 5:24 |
| 10. | "Generals" (from Strawberries, 1982) | Gray | 3:27 |
| 11. | "Grimly Fiendish" (from Phantasmagoria, 1985) | Scabies, Vanian, Roman Jugg, Bryn Merrick, Clive Jackson | 5:12 |
| 12. | "Eloise" (from "Eloise", 1986; originally performed by Barry Ryan) | Paul Ryan | 5:11 |
| 13. | "Anything" (from Anything, 1986) | Scabies, Vanian, Jugg, Merrick | 4:43 |
| 14. | "In Dulce Decorum" (from Anything, 1986) | Scabies, Vanian, Jugg, Merrick | 4:38 |
| Total length: | | | 73:34 |

== Personnel ==
Band members

- Dave Vanian – lead vocals on all tracks except "Silly Kids Games"
- Brian James – guitar and backing vocals on tracks from "New Rose", Damned Damned Damned, "Stretcher Case Baby", and Music for Pleasure
- Captain Sensible – bass guitar and backing vocals on tracks from "New Rose", Damned Damned Damned, "Stretcher Case Baby", and Music for Pleasure; guitar, keyboard, and backing vocals on tracks from Machine Gun Etiquette, The Black Album, "Lovely Money", and Strawberries; lead vocals on "Silly Kids Games"
- Rat Scabies – drums and backing vocals on all tracks; guitar on "Drinking About My Baby"; synthesizer on tracks from Strawberries
- Lu Edmonds – guitar on tracks from Music for Pleasure
- Algy Ward – bass guitar and backing vocals on tracks from Machine Gun Etiquette
- Paul Gray – bass guitar and backing vocals on tracks from The Black Album, "Lovely Money", and Strawberries
- Roman Jugg – keyboard on tracks from Strawberries and Anything; guitar on tracks from Phantasmagoria, "Eloise", and Anything
- Bryn Merrick – bass guitar and backing vocals on tracks from Phantasmagoria, "Eloise", and Anything

Additional musicians

- Lol Coxhill – saxophone on tracks from Music for Pleasure
- Vivian Stanshall – spoken word on "Lovely Money"
- Andy Richards – keyboard on "Grimly Fiendish"
- Luís Jardim – percussion on "Grimly Fiendish"
- Gary Barnacle – saxophone on "Grimly Fiendish"

Production

- Nick Lowe – producer of tracks from "New Rose" and Damned Damned Damned
- Bazza – recording engineer of tracks from Damned Damned Damned
- Shel Talmy – producer of "Stretcher Case Baby"
- Roger Armstrong – producer of tracks from Music for Pleasure
- Hans Zimmer – producer of "The History of the World (Part 1)"
- Tony Mansfield – producer of "Lovely Money"
- Hugh Jones – producer of tracks from Strawberries
- Jon Kelly – producer of tracks from Phantasmagoria, "Eloise", and Anything
