= The Light at the End of the Tunnel =

Compilation album by The Damned
- Released: 30 November 1987
- Recorded: 1976–1986
- Genre: Punk rock
- Length: 124:52
- Label: MCA
- Producer: Various

The Damned chronology
Mindless Directionless Energy (1987)	The Light at the End of the Tunnel (1987)	Final Damnation (1989)

Professional ratings
Review scores
Source	Rating
AllMusic	4.5/5 stars
New Musical Express	10/10

The Light at the End of the Tunnel is a double compilation album by the Damned, released by MCA in 1987 as a retrospective collection. The same name was also given to a concurrently released video cassette and an approved band biography by Carol Clerk.

The package was marketed as a greatest hits collection, but while it includes many of the band/s acknowledged standards, several of the songs were album tracks, while others were B-sides or other rarities. This Damned retrospective, however, is the only one to unite studio recordings from all of the studio albums the band had released between 1977 and 1986.

MCA issued the Anything album track "In Dulce Decorum" as a single to support the release. The Light at the End of the Tunnel charted for a week at No. 87 in the UK Album Charts, the band's final chart entry until 2018's Evil Spirits, which reached No. 7.

According to an interview given by Rat Scabies on the Night Network TV show in 1987 the album was originally supposed to be titled "The Light At The End Of The Tunnel May Be An Oncoming Train".

== Track listing ==
=== Disc 1 ===
1. "I Feel Alright" (Alexander, Asheton, Pop) – 4:26
2. "Anything" (Jugg, Scabies, Vanian, Merrick) – 4:48
3. "Lovely Money" (Sensible, Scabies, Vanian, Gray) – 5:20
4. "Thanks For The Night (Rat Mix)" (Sensible) – 3:55
5. "Plan 9 Channel 7" (Sensible, Scabies, Vanian, Ward) – 5:06
6. "Grimly Fiendish (Bad Trip Mix)" (Jugg, Scabies, Vanian, Merrick) – 5:10
7. "Stranger on the Town" (Scabies, Vanian, Gray) – 5:13
8. "Neat Neat Neat" (James) – 2:40
9. "Alone Again Or" (Maclean) – 3:30
10. "Is It A Dream? (Wild West End Mix)" (Jugg, Scabies, Vanian, Merrick) – 3:20
11. "Smash It Up Parts I & II" (Sensible, Scabies, Vanian, Ward) – 4:51
12. "Psychomania" (Jugg, Scabies, Vanian, Merrick) – 4:04
13. "Curtain Call" (Sensible, Scabies, Vanian, Gray) – 17:13

=== Disc 2 ===
1. "Ignite" (Sensible, Scabies, Vanian, Gray) – 4:50
2. "Help!" (Lennon, McCartney) – 1:38
3. "Rabid (Over You) (CD Mix)" (Sensible, Scabies, Vanian, LeVien) – 3:41
4. "I Just Can't Be Happy Today" (Sensible, Scabies, Vanian, Ward) – 3:40
5. "Problem Child" (James) – 2:12
6. "Nasty" (Sensible, Scabies, Vanian, Jugg, Merrick) – 2:48
7. "Disco Man" (Sensible, Scabies, Vanian, Gray) – 3:14
8. "New Rose" (James) – 2:39
9. "Love Song" (Sensible, Scabies, Vanian, Ward) – 2:03
10. "Feel the Pain" (James) – 3:34
11. "The History of the World (Part 1)" (Sensible, Scabies, Vanian, Gray) – 3:56
12. "In Dulce Decorum" (Jugg, Scabies, Vanian, Merrick) – 4:35
13. "Trojans" (Jugg, Scabies, Vanian, Merrick) – 4:48
14. "Eloise" (Ryan) – 5:07
15. "The Shadow Of Love (Ten Inches of Hell Mix)" – (Jugg, Scabies, Vanian, Merrick) – 6:34

== Track origins ==
"New Rose" was the band's first single, released in 1976, with a cover of the Beatles' "Help!" as the B-side.

"Neat Neat Neat" (their second single), Stooges cover "I Feel Alright" and "Feel the Pain" were taken from the band's 1977 album Damned, Damned, Damned.

"Problem Child" was the first single released from the group's second album, Music for Pleasure, also released in 1977.

"Love Song", "Smash It Up Parts I & II", "I Just Can't Be Happy Today" and "Plan 9 Channel 7" were taken from the 1979 album Machine Gun Etiquette.

"Rabid (Over You)" was a remix of a track previously issued as a B-side to the "White Rabbit" single, also originally released in 1980.

"The History of the World Part 1" and "Curtain Call" were from the 1980 album The Black Album.

"Disco Man" was the lead track from the Friday 13th EP.

"Ignite" and "Stranger on the Town" were from the Strawberries album.

"Nasty" was the B-side to the "Thanks for the Night" single. It was originally recorded for the BBC sitcom The Young Ones.

The remixes of "Grimly Fiendish" and "The Shadow of Love" were taken from the maxi-single releases of each song.

"Trojans" and "Is It A Dream?" were taken from the 1985 album Phantasmagoria.

"Eloise" was released as a single in 1986.

"Anything", Love cover "Alone Again Or", "Psychomania" and "In Dulce Decorum" were all released on the Anything album in 1986.

The remix of "Thanks for the Night" was originally released on the maxi-single release of "Anything".

== Production credits ==
- Producers:
  - Nick Lowe – Tracks 1, 8, 15, 21, 23
  - Jon Kelly – Tracks 2, 9, 10, 12, 25–28
  - The Damned – Tracks 3, 5, 6, 7, 11, 13, 14, 17, 19, 22, 24
  - Tony Mansfield – Tracks 3, 20
  - Hein Hoven – Track 4
  - Roger Armstrong – Tracks 5, 11, 17, 22
  - Bob Sargeant – Track 6
  - Hugh Jones – Tracks 7, 14
  - Nick Mason – Track 18
  - Hans Zimmer – Track 24
- Musicians:
  - Dave Vanian − vocals
  - Brian James − guitar on Tracks 1, 8, 15, 18, 21, 23
  - Captain Sensible − bass on Tracks 1, 8, 15, 18, 21, 23; guitar on Tracks 3–5, 7, 11, 13, 14, 16, 17, 19, 20, 22, 24
  - Rat Scabies − drums
  - Lu Edmunds − guitar on Track 18
  - Algy Ward − bass on Tracks 5, 11, 16, 17, 22
  - Paul Gray − bass on Tracks 3, 7, 13, 14, 20, 24
  - Roman Jugg − keyboards on Tracks 3, 4, 6, 7, 10, 14, 26–28; guitar on Tracks 2, 6, 9, 10, 12, 19, 25–28
  - Bryn Merrick − bass on Tracks 2, 4, 6, 9, 10, 12, 19, 25–28
