= A Night of a Thousand Vampires: Live in London =

Live album and concert film by the Damned
- Released: 28 October 2022
- Recorded: 28 October 2019
- Venue: London Palladium
- Genre: Punk rock; gothic rock
- Length: 93:27 (audio CDs); 96:25 (Blu-ray)
- Label: earMUSIC

The Damned chronology
The Rockfield Files (2020)	A Night of a Thousand Vampires: Live in London (2022)	Darkadelic (2023)

Singles from A Night of a Thousand Vampires
- 1. "Wait for the Blackout" Released: 24 August 2022; 2. "Grimly Fiendish" Released: 28 September 2022; 3. "Neat Neat Neat" / "Bela Lugosi's Dead" Released: 26 October 2022

A Night of a Thousand Vampires: Live in London is a live album and concert film by English rock band the Damned, released on 28 October 2022 through earMUSIC. It was released as a 2- CD/1-Blu-ray set and various two-LP gatefolds. The film premiered as part of FrightFest Halloween on 27 October 2022 at Cineworld Leicester Square in London. It was recorded and filmed for a special one-off musical and theatrical performance billed as A Night of a Thousand Vampires at the London Palladium on 28 October 2019. Directed by Martin Gooch, the concert film features the cast of The Circus of Horrors performing alongside the Damned. The live show marked the final gig of drummer Andrew 'Pinch' Pinching after 20 years with the band.

A Night of a Thousand Vampires reached number 1 on the UK Music Video Chart and number 7 on the UK Blu-Ray Chart.

== Background ==
Singer David Vanian told Paste magazine in 2023 that "there actually were a thousand vampires in the audience. Everybody came dressed as vampires, of whatever era they wanted to be, and the whole point of it started off because I just wanted to make a very different type of show – I wanted to [do] something we've never done, which was picking songs we'd never played and also doing it as a theatrical experience."

Songs performed on the night but not included on the album and in the film are "New Rose", "Smash It Up", "Nasty", and "Shadow of Love".

== Concert film ==
The film opens with black-and-white footage of fans arriving at the London Palladium – many in Victorian dress and vampire attire – as a horse drawn carriage arrives with a coffin inside. The coffin, with David Vanian's body in it, is carried into the theatre and laid on the stage. As the concert begins, the film changes from black-and-white into colour. The Damned performs songs from their 40-year catalogue, supported by trumpet player Chris Coull, solo violinists Yury Revich and Vanian's daughter Emily Vanian, and the Maple Rose Strings. Throughout the show, the band is joined by an array of vampires, ghouls, dancers, acrobats, contortionists, and fire breathers.

For the first half of the show, Vanian is made up as a "very typical Bela Lugosi type of vampire, with a cape and an evening suit and the same kind of look," Vanian said. "And then in the interim, the 20 minutes between the shows, I then shaved all my hair off and completely converted into Nosferatu for the last part of the set – the classic Max Schreck look."

Vanian said of the theatrical part of the show: "we didn't rehearse any of it and the band didn't know what was happening – only I knew. It was quite an interesting night!"

== Reception ==
=== Audio CD ===
Professional ratings
Review scores
Source	Rating
House of Prog	9/10
Metal Digest	8/10
New Noise Magazine	4/5 stars
Ox-Fanzine	3/5 stars

New Noise Magazine described the album as a "remarkable set" that includes much of the Damned's "darker, goth material." They felt that the band is "still playing at their best," and that the addition of strings and trumpet "just adds to the ghoulish atmosphere." Besides some of the band's own songs, they highlighted a cover of the Doors' "People Are Strange" and an "inspired medley" of "Neat Neat Neat" and Bauhaus' "Bela Lugosi's Dead."

Metal Digest wrote, "There are a few moments here which probably need the visuals to be fully appreciated ... but even in the twilight of their career, the Damned show that they can still pull out all the stops with an excellent live album." The House of Prog web site called it a "superb album," writing, "Vanian is singing as well as he ever has, while Oxymoron has always been a wonderful sonic asset to the band, the rhythm section is tight, while Sensible is polished and powerful."

=== Blu-ray ===
Reviewing the concert film, The Moshville Times website said that "there really isn't a dull moment ... the spectacular elements are brought courtesy of the numerous extras who add so much to the show ... It's not a gig, it's a spectacle and it's been captured very well indeed for this release."

Other reviewers also noted the Vampira dancers and The Circus of Horrors, who appear onstage throughout the show. The V13.net website wrote that the performers "punctuate each song as a type of set piece, adding to the theatre and ambience of each song's theme," while Louder Than War felt they bring a "bizarre and affecting beauty to the music of the Damned." Maximum Volume Music called it a "well thought out and executed occasion" and a "totally immersive experience both visually and aurally."

== Track listing ==
=== Audio CD ===
Disc one
No.	Title	Writer(s)	Length
1.	"Beauty of the Beast"	David Vanian	3:45
2.	"Wait for the Blackout"	Paul Gray, Billy Karloff, Rat Scabies, Captain Sensible, Vanian	4:06
3.	"Plan 9 Channel 7"	Scabies, Sensible, Vanian, Algy Ward	4:49
4.	"Standing on the Edge of Tomorrow"	Vanian	4:15
5.	"Grimly Fiendish"	Clive Jackson, Roman Jugg, Bryn Merrick, Scabies, Vanian	3:49
6.	"Dr. Jeckyll and Mr. Hyde"	Giovanni Dadomo, Gray, Scabies, Sensible, Vanian	4:55
7.	"Absinthe"	Vanian	3:59
8.	"Under the Floor Again"	Gray, Scabies, Sensible, Vanian	5:49
9.	"I Just Can't Be Happy Today"	Dadomo, Scabies, Sensible, Vanian, Ward	4:32
10.	"13th Floor Vendetta"	Gray, Scabies, Sensible, Vanian	4:43
Total length:			44:51

Disc two
No.	Title	Writer(s)	Length
1.	"Eloise"	Paul Ryan	5:58
2.	"People Are Strange"	Jim Morrison, Robby Krieger	2:07
3.	"Curtain Call"	Gray, Scabies, Sensible, Vanian	15:03
4.	"Tightrope Walk"	Jugg, Merrick, Scabies, Vanian	4:15
5.	"The Dog"	Gray, Scabies, Sensible, Vanian	5:56
6.	"Neat Neat Neat" / "Bela Lugosi's Dead"	Brian James / Daniel Ash, Kevin Haskins, David J, Peter Murphy	9:49
7.	"Black Is the Night"	Vanian	5:22
Total length:			48:36

=== Blu-ray ===
- Track listing as per CD, except for "People Are Strange", which is the penultimate track between "Neat Neat Neat" / "Bela Lugosi's Dead" and "Black Is the Night".

== Personnel ==
Adapted from the album liner notes and film credits.

The Damned

- David Vanian – vocals, concept, artistic director, executive producer
- Captain Sensible – guitar
- Monty Oxymoron – keyboards
- Paul Gray – bass
- Andrew Pinching – drums

Additional musicians

- Chris Coull – trumpet
- Emily Vanian – solo violin
- Yury Revich – solo violin

The Maple Rose Strings:

- Gillian Mott – violin
- Mallory Hamm – violin
- Alison D'Souza – viola
- Sally Wragg – viola
- Jay Jenkinson – cello
- Marianne Hardisty – cello
- Clare Wilson – double bass

Film performers

- The Circus of Horrors – performers
- Indica Watson – "Claudia", ventriloquist dummy
- Jed – lady in black
- Moana Santana – Vampira dancer
- Hélène de Joie – Vampira dancer

Technical

- Tony Newton – sound recording
- Thomas Mitchener – audio album mixing
- Robin Schmidt – audio mastering
- Graham Humphreys – poster, cover artwork
- Alexander Mertsch – digipak design
- Dod Morrison – photography
- Martin Gooch – film director, editing, camera operator
- Ben Inskip – show director
- Paul Smith – lighting operator
- Des Murphy – video creation (back drop)
- SFL – scenic manufacturer
- Mark Sloper – video director
- Christian Riou – video production manager
- Liam Ayres – camera operator
- Sam Osborne – camera operator
- Sebastian Wood – camera operator
- Rupert Osborne – mini-camera
- Patricia Morrison – wardrobe, 1st stage director
- Brian Kinney – makeup designer
- Don Jenkins – executive producer
- Craig Jennings – executive producer
- Steve Homer – executive producer
- Simon Oakes – executive producer

== Chart performance ==
Chart performance of Blu-ray edition of A Night of a Thousand Vampires: Live in London
Chart (2022)	Peak position
UK Music Video Chart	1
UK Blu-Ray Chart	7
