= Gigolo (The Damned song) =

Single by the Damned

from the album Anything
- B-side: "The Portrait"
- Released: 19 January 1987
- Recorded: 1986
- Genre: New wave; gothic rock; progressive rock
- Length: 3:59
- Label: MCA; GRIM 6
- Songwriter(s): Dave Vanian; Roman Jugg; Bryn Merrick; Rat Scabies
- Producer(s): Jon Kelly

The Damned singles chronology
| "Anything" (1986) | "Gigolo" (1987) | "Alone Again Or" (1987) |

"Gigolo" is a single by the English rock band the Damned, released on 23 January 1987 by MCA Records.

The single was released in a bewildering array of 7" variants - copies were pressed on standard black vinyl, green vinyl, blue vinyl, red vinyl and yellow vinyl, and the coloured versions also included a poster sleeve. "Gigolo" was substantially edited from the album version, with around two minutes of the introduction excised for single release.

The introduction to the song was closely derived from the song "Gigolo Aunt" by Syd Barrett, which is also referenced in the lyric.

A promotional clip directed by Gerard de Thame helped the single reach No. 29.

MCA also issued the single in Australia, Germany, Italy and Spain.

The B-side instrumental track "The Portrait" was used in the episode "A Womb with a View" of the television series Moonlighting. The extended version of "The Portrait" (on the 12" single) contained a sample of the Bernard Herrmann-penned untitled theme song from the film Portrait of Jennie (1948).

== Track listing ==
1. "Gigolo" (Jugg, Scabies, Vanian, Merrick) - 3:59
2. "The Portrait" (Jugg, Scabies, Vanian, Merrick) - 3:50

12" single

1. "Gigolo (Extended Version)" (Jugg, Scabies, Vanian, Merrick) - 4:45
2. "The Portrait (Extended Version)" (Jugg, Scabies, Vanian, Merrick) - 4:41

== Production credits ==
- Producer:
  - Jon Kelly
- Musicians:
  - Dave Vanian − vocals
  - Rat Scabies − drums
  - Roman Jugg − guitar, keyboards
  - Bryn Merrick − bass
  - Kurt Holmes – trumpet on "Gigolo"
