= There Ain't No Sanity Clause =

Single by the Damned
- B-side: "Hit or Miss"; "Looking at You (Live)"
- Released: 24 November 1980
- Recorded: 1980
- Genre: Rock
- Label: Chiswick; CHIS 125
- Songwriters: Rat Scabies; Captain Sensible; Dave Vanian; Giovanni Dadamo
- Producer: Hugh Jones

The Damned singles chronology
"The History of the World (Part 1)" (1980)	"There Ain't No Sanity Clause" (1980)	"Dr Jekyll & Mr Hyde" (1981)

"There Ain't No Sanity Clause" is a single by the English rock band the Damned, released on 24 November 1980.

The song was a tongue-in-cheek rock song released with an eye on the lucrative UK Christmas singles market, but it failed to chart.

The single was the last new material to be released by the band on Chiswick Records. However, Chiswick would continue to reissue singles by the Damned, culled from existing material on their Big Beat imprint, including "Wait for the Blackout", "Lively Arts", reissues of "Love Song" and "Smash It Up", and a remixed version of "There Ain't No Sanity Clause" with new lyrics, which reached No. 97 on the UK singles chart in December 1983.

The title and chorus of the song were derived from a scene in the Marx Brothers' 1935 movie A Night at the Opera, in which Groucho Marx attempts to explain the intricacies of a business contract to Chico Marx. When Groucho mentions the "sanity clause", Chico responds, "You can't fool me. There ain't no sanity clause!"

"There Ain't No Sanity Clause" was written with Giovanni Dadamo of the Snivelling Shits, who also recorded a version of the song which was included on CD reissues of their I Can't Come album.

== Track listing ==
1. "There Ain't No Sanity Clause" (Scabies, Sensible, Vanian, Dadamo)
2. "Hit or Miss" (Scabies, Sensible, Vanian, Gray)
3. "Looking at You (Live)" (MC5)

== Track listing - 1983 Version ==
7" Version:

1. "There Ain't No Sanity Clause (Remix)" (Scabies, Sensible, Vanian, Dadamo)
2. "Looking at You (Live)" (MC5)

12" Version:

1. "There Ain't No Sanity Clause (Remix)" (Scabies, Sensible, Vanian, Dadamo)
2. "Looking at You (Live)" (MC5)
3. "Anti-Pope (Fiddling About Version)" (Sensible, Vanian, Scabies, Ward)

== Production credits ==
Producer

- Hugh Jones

Musicians

- Dave Vanian − vocals
- Captain Sensible − guitar
- Rat Scabies − drums
- Paul Gray − bass
