= Anything (The Damned song) =

Single by The Damned

from the album Anything
- B-side: "The Year of the Jackal"
- Released: 10 November 1986
- Recorded: 1986
- Studio: Puk Recording Studios (Gjerlev, Denmark)
- Length: 4:48
- Label: MCA; GRIM 5
- Songwriters: Jugg; Scabies; Vanian; Merrick
- Producer: Joe Sierocinski

The Damned singles chronology
| "Eloise" (1986) | "Anything" (1986) | "Gigolo" (1987) |

"Anything" is a single by the English rock band the Damned, released on 10 November 1986 by MCA Records.

Previewing the group's new album of the same name, the song saw a slight move away from the goth rock of Phantasmagoria, to a more mainstream rock sound. The single received indifferent reviews, and considering the success of the previous album and "Eloise", its UK singles chart peak of No. 32 was seen as a disappointment.

MCA also issued the single in Ireland and Australia.

== Track listing ==
1. "Anything" (Jugg, Scabies, Vanian, Merrick) – 4:48
2. "The Year of the Jackal" (Jugg, Scabies, Vanian, Merrick)

12" single: -

1. "Anything (Another Mix)" (Jugg, Scabies, Vanian, Merrick)
2. "The Year of the Jackal" (Jugg, Scabies, Vanian, Merrick)
3. "Thanks for the Night (Rat Mix)" (Sensible)

10" single: -

1. "Anything (Yet Another Mix)" (Jugg, Scabies, Vanian, Merrick)
2. "Anything (Instrumental)" (Jugg, Scabies, Vanian, Merrick) – 4:48
3. "Anything (And Yet Another Mix)" (Jugg, Scabies, Vanian, Merrick)
4. "The Year of the Jackal" (Jugg, Scabies, Vanian, Merrick)

== Production credits ==
- Producer:
  - Jon Kelly ("Anything")
  - The Damned ("Year of the Jackal")
  - Hein Hoven ("Thanks for the Night")
- Musicians:
  - Dave Vanian − vocals
  - Rat Scabies − drums
  - Roman Jugg − guitar, keyboards
  - Bryn Merrick − bass
