= In Dulce Decorum =

Single by the Damned

from the album Anything
- B-side: "Psychomania"
- Released: 16 November 1987
- Recorded: Denmark, 1986
- Genre: Gothic rock
- Length: 4:47
- Label: MCA; GRIM 8
- Songwriters: Dave Vanian; Roman Jugg; Bryn Merrick; Rat Scabies
- Producer: Jon Kelly

The Damned singles chronology
"Alone Again Or" (1987)	"In Dulce Decorum" (1987)	"Fun Factory" (1991)

Official audio
- "In Dulce Decorum" on YouTube

"In Dulce Decorum" is a song by the English rock band the Damned, released on 16 November 1987 by MCA Records.

The song was originally recorded for the album Anything (1986), but was issued as a single to promote MCA's Damned retrospective Light at the End of the Tunnel (1987). MCA also issued the single in Germany.

The single, the Damned's last to break into the UK charts, hit No. 72. It was featured in the Miami Vice third-season episode "Walk Alone", and an instrumental version was included in the Miami Vice II soundtrack.

The track was inspired by Wilfred Owen's poem Dulce et Decorum est (1920), and begins with an excerpt from a speech by Winston Churchill to the House of Commons as the Battle of Britain began on 18 June 1940: Let us therefore brace ourselves to our duties, and so bear ourselves that, if the British Empire and Commonwealth last for a thousand years, men will still say, "This was their finest hour".

== Track listing ==
7" single:

1. "In Dulce Decorum" (Jugg, Scabies, Vanian, Merrick) – 4:47
2. "Psychomania" (Jugg, Scabies, Vanian, Merrick) – 4:03

12" single:

1. "In Dulce Decorum" (Extended Version) (Jugg, Scabies, Vanian, Merrick) – 5:58
2. "Psychomania" (Jugg, Scabies, Vanian, Merrick) – 4:03
3. "In Dulce Decorum" (Dub) (Jugg, Scabies, Vanian, Merrick) – 4:41

== Production credits ==
- Producer:
  - Jon Kelly
- Musicians:
  - Dave Vanian − vocals
  - Rat Scabies − drums
  - Roman Jugg − guitar, keyboards
  - Bryn Merrick − bass
  - Paul Shepley − keyboards on live track
