= Anything (The Damned album) =

Studio album by the Damned
- Released: 1 December 1986
- Recorded: June–August 1986
- Studios: Puk Recording Studios, Denmark
- Genres: Pop; gothic rock
- Length: 41:00
- Label: MCA
- Producer: Jon Kelly

The Damned chronology
Phantasmagoria (1985)	Anything (1986)	The Light at the End of the Tunnel (1987)

Singles from Anything
- 1. "Anything" Released: 10 November 1986; 2. "Gigolo" Released: 19 January 1987; 3. "Alone Again Or" Released: 13 April 1987; 4. "In Dulce Decorum" Released: 16 November 1987

Alternative cover
- 1986 US and Canadian album cover

Anything is the seventh studio album by the English punk rock band the Damned, released by MCA Records in 1986. On the album's release, it charted in the United Kingdom, peaking at No. 40, and was certified Silver by the British Phonographic Industry. Four singles were released that all charted in the UK.

It saw the band continue with their gothic rock sound largely present on the band's previous album Phantasmagoria (1985). However, it also saw the band shift towards a mainstream rock sound with glossy production, something which frontman and singer Dave Vanian would later regret.

== Background and Production ==
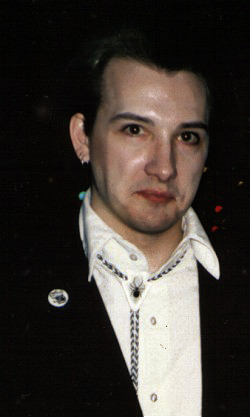
Vocalist Dave Vanian in 1986.

The album began production in June 1986 in Puk Recording Studios in Denmark. The Damned's vocalist, Dave Vanian, later stated that the group were forced into the studio to record the album before they had prepared any new material for it. This pressure stemmed from the surprising success of their cover of "Eloise", which reached number 3.Drummer Rat Scabies mentioned that the group had demoed the song "In Dulce Decorum", but most of the songs were written in the studio.

In July, the group took a break from recording to perform a 10th anniversary performance in London at the Town and Country Club and two in Finsbury Park, where the group performed some songs that would appear on Anything, and were joined by Captain Sensible to perform "Smash It Up". On returning to Denmark, the group recorded a cover of "Alone Again Or," by the sixties band Love, which Scabies originally thought was written by Roman Jugg. The album concluded production in August.

== Release and tour ==
Following the recording sessions, the Damned toured Ireland and Britain in October and concluded the tour in Ireland in November. The group began having issues with technology on the tour (the brass parts of "Psychomania" crept in when the group were performing "In Dulce Decorum") and had to use an emulator to recreate some of their studio sound. Prior to the album's release, a single for "Anything" was released in November.

Anything was released on MCA Records on 1 December 1986 in the United Kingdom. In the UK, the album charted for two weeks, peaking at No. 40. It was certified Silver by the British Phonographic Industry. After the release of the "Gigolo" single in January 1987, the Damned toured Europe until February. They toured Australia in March and Japan in April. The Damned's next release, "Alone Again Or," reached No. 27 on the UK chart, and would be the band's final top 40 single. During a booking hiatus, the group returned to performing shows as the alter ego Naz Nomad and the Nightmares. "In Dulce Decorum" was released as the final single from the album in November 1987.

In the United States, MCA released "Anything", "In Dulce Decorum" and "Alone Again Or" as singles.

== Aftermath ==
Following the release of Anything, Vanian said that "the manager got the swimming pool he wanted and then everyone that signed us to MCA left the company and those that were left didn’t know what to do with us." MCA followed the release with a Damned compilation album titled Light at the End of the Tunnel in November 1987. After its lukewarm success, reaching number 87 in the UK and only staying on the chart for a week, MCA and The Damned parted ways the following year.

== Critical reception ==
Professional ratings
Review scores
Source	Rating
AllMusic	2/5 stars
The Encyclopedia of Popular Music	2/5 stars
MusicHound Rock: The Essential Album Guide	1/5 stars
The Rolling Stone Album Guide	1/5 stars

Contemporary reviews were mainly positive, The Ottawa Citizen gave the album a positive review, describing the album as "varied but not disjointed" and that the Damned had become a "superb pop band" that make a "better pop band of the '80s than it did a punk band of the '70s".

The Vancouver Sun also praised the album, stating that the Damned "have made the switch to mood music quite well, almost rising to the level of the mighty Stranglers". The review compared the album to music by Simple Minds, opining that the album was what they "want to sound like, moody and atmospheric without getting all doomy and gloomy".

Retrospective reception was far more negative, A retrospective review from AllMusic was negative, awarding the album 2 stars and calling it the worst album of the original group's catalogue. The review specifically pointed out "Restless" and "In Dulce Decorum" as meandering, and noted that the tracks "Psychomania" and "Anything" were the only tracks that "generate anything approximating the energy of the Damned's best music".

Trouser Press dismissed the album, observing, "Anything boasts a neat version of Love’s “Alone Again Or,” but otherwise falls well short of achieving anything memorable. Despite the Damned's proven ability to alternately rock gothic and play nice, there's no audible point to the music; it's hard to imagine who would find this LP pleasurable."

In an album ranking list Mörat of Louder put Anything second to worst on the list, praising only the cover of Alone Again Or "and the vaguely hummable Gigolo," saying "the rest is turgid at best, and plain boring at worst. Such was their lack of inspiration that they couldn’t even come up with a proper album title, so for want of a better idea... “Oh, call it anything.”"

When later asked about the Phantasmagoria and Anything albums, Vanian said that "some of the production in retrospect could have been done a little better, but it was the '80's. Some of those songs were just as heartfelt as anything that had gone before despite the frills and ruffles".

== Track listing ==
All tracks are written by Roman Jugg, Rat Scabies, Bryn Merrick and Dave Vanian, except "Alone Again Or" by Bryan MacLean.

No.	Title	Length
1.	"Anything"	4:47
2.	"Alone Again Or"	3:38
3.	"The Portrait"	3:50
4.	"Restless"	4:57
5.	"In Dulce Decorum"	4:47
6.	"Gigolo"	6:02
7.	"The Girl Goes Down"	4:35
8.	"Tightrope Walk"	4:21
9.	"Psychomania"	4:03
Total length:		41:00

== Personnel ==
The Damned

- Dave Vanian – lead vocals
- Roman Jugg – guitars, keyboards, vocals
- Bryn Merrick – bass, vocals
- Rat Scabies – drums

Additional musicians

- Blue Weaver – keyboards
- Paul "Shirley" Shepley – keyboards
- Paul Wickens – keyboards
- Suzie O'List – backing vocals
- Kurt Holm – trumpet

Production

- Jon Kelly – production, engineering, mixing (2, 7, 9)
- Henrik Nilsson – additional engineering
- Lance Phillips – additional engineering
- Alan O'Duffy – additional engineering
- Ken Thomas – mixing (3, 6, 8)
- Nigel Walker – mixing (1, 4, 5)
- Howard Raybould – album cover carving
- Jef Hartley – album cover painting
- Booce – album cover painting
- The Leisure Process – design, art direction
- Nick Knight – photography

== Charts ==
Song charts
Year	Song	Peak positions
Year	Song	UK
1986	"Anything"	32
1987	"Gigolo"	29
1987	"Alone Again Or"	27
1987	"In Dulce Decorum"	72

== Certifications ==
Region	Certification	Certified units/sales
United Kingdom (BPI)	Silver	60,000^{^}
^{^} Shipments figures based on certification alone.

== Notes ==
=== References ===
- Popoff, Martin (2010). Goldmine Standard Catalog of American Records 1948–1991. Krause Publications. ISBN 978-1440216213.
