= Naz Nomad and the Nightmares =

UK musical group

Naz Nomad and The Nightmares was a British musical group featuring the members of British punk and gothic rock band the Damned, active in the 1980s and occasionally thereafter.

Naz Nomad and The Nightmares released one album, entitled Give Daddy The Knife Cindy (1984). The album was packaged to look like the re-issue of a 1967 soundtrack album to a (fictitious) low budget American horror film. A copyright notice on the front cover claimed the film was "Copyright 1967 American Screen Destiny Pictures", and credits are given for the film's stars, director and producer.

The album itself featured covers of songs originally recorded by garage rock and psychedelic acts of the 1960s who had influenced the Damned, plus two original numbers in the same style. Each member of the band took on pseudonyms different from those used in the Damned for the project.

== Members ==
- Dave Vanian as Naz Nomad – vocals
- Roman Jugg as Sphinx Svenson - guitars; also as Ulla - keyboards
- Rat Scabies as Nick Detroit - drums
- Bryn Merrick as Buddy Lee Junior - bass guitar
- Donagh O'Leary as Pretty Boy Padovani for 1992 live performances -- bass guitar

== Discography ==
- Various Artists - The Whip (1983)
1. "The Whip" - Dave Sex Gang
2. "Scream Like an Angel" - Brilliant
3. "The Hungry Years" - Andi Sex Gang/Marc Almond
4. "32nd Piano Concerto in A Minor" - Mathew Best
5. "Hide and Seek" - Brigandage
6. "Tenterhook" - Dave Vanian
7. "Bloodstains, Pleasure" - Play Dead
8. "Weetabix and Bran Flakes" - A Short Commercial Break
9. "ShMYhShVh" - Blood and Roses
10. "Slave Drive" - Slave Drive
11. "Oh Funny Man" - Sex Gang Children

(Naz Nomad and the Nightmares, performing an early version of "Just Call Me Sky", make a guest appearance at the end of Dave Vanian's track)

- Give Daddy the Knife Cindy (1984)
1. "Nobody but Me" - (The Human Beinz cover)
2. "Action Woman" - (The Litter cover)
3. "The Wind Blows Your Hair" - (The Seeds cover)
4. "Kicks" - (Paul Revere and the Raiders cover)
5. "Cold Turkey" - (Big Boy Pete cover)
6. "She Lied" - (Rockin' Ramrods cover)
7. "I Had Too Much to Dream (Last Night)" - (The Electric Prunes cover)
8. "The Trip" – (Kim Fowley cover)
9. "I Can't Stand This Love, Goodbye" - (The Others cover)
10. "I Can Only Give You Everything" - (Them cover)
11. "(Do You Know) I Know"
12. "Just Call Me Sky"
- Various Artists - A Pretty Smart Way to Catch a Lobster: Live at Alice in Wonderland (1986)
1. "Lost in Heart" - Voodoo Child
2. "7 Light Years" - Underground Zero
3. "These Boots Are Made For Walkin'" - (Doctor and the Medics performing as) Gwyllym and the Raspberry Flavoured Cat
4. "Oh Yeah" - (Naz Nomad and the Nightmares performing as) The Spooks
5. "Aimless Flight" - Underground Zero
6. "Voodoo Child" - Voodoo Child
7. "Gloria" - Gwyllym and the Raspberry Flavoured Cat
8. "Son of Man" - Webcore

=== Single ===
Title	Date of release	US chart position	UK chart position
"I Had Too Much to Dream (Last Night)"	1984	-	-
