= Alone Again Or =

1968 single by Love

Single by Love

from the album Forever Changes
- B-side: "A House Is Not a Motel"
- Released: January 1968
- Recorded: September 10, 1967
- Studio: Sunset Sound Recorders, Hollywood, Los Angeles
- Genre: Psychedelic folk; psychedelia; flamenco
- Length: 3:16
- Label: Elektra
- Songwriter: Bryan MacLean
- Producers: Bruce Botnick; Arthur Lee

Love singles chronology
"¡Que Vida!" (1967)	"Alone Again Or" (1968)	"Your Mind and We Belong Together" (1968)

"Alone Again Or" is a song originally recorded in 1967 by the rock group Love and written by band member Bryan MacLean. It appears on the album Forever Changes, and was released as a single in the USA, UK, Australia, France and the Netherlands.

== Original version ==
MacLean wrote the song, then called "Alone Again", in 1965 for Love's debut album. However, he did not complete it until the recording of Forever Changes in the summer of 1967. The song was inspired by his memory of waiting for a girlfriend, and, according to Barney Hoskyns, the melody drew loosely on Sergei Prokofiev's Lieutenant Kije Suite. The essence of the song is the contrast between the positivity of the tune and the bleakness of the lyrics, with the chorus "And I will be alone again tonight, my dear" finishing with a lone acoustic guitar, closing the song with the opening melody that sounds anything but ecstatic, ending with an E minor plus 2 chord.

For the recording session, which took place on September 10, 1967 at Sunset Sound Recorders in Hollywood, arranger David Angel worked with MacLean, adding a string section and a horn part. MacLean later said, "That was the happiest I ever was with anything we ever did as a band – the orchestral arrangement of that song". However, Botnick, with co-producer and band leader Arthur Lee, remixed the track to bring Lee's own unison vocal to the forefront of the song, at least partly on the grounds that MacLean's own vocal lead was too weak. Lee also added to the mystery of the song by changing the title to "Alone Again Or".

According to the band's guitarist Johnny Echols, "Bryan's song opening the album....had Arthur been involved it wouldn't have been that way. Arthur wasn't even at the studio when we recorded "Alone Again". He comes in later and he liked it, so he sings harmony with Bryan....later on, he put his voice ahead of Bryan, so you hear his voice more than Bryan on some of the releases."

With Lee now on co-lead vocals, "Alone Again Or" became the opening track of Forever Changes. It was the sole single released from the album to reach the Billboard singles chart. Its 1968 B-side was Lee's "A House Is Not a Motel", although the 1970 reissue of the single featured "Good Times" from the 1969 Four Sail album instead. "Alone Again Or", in an edited version in early 1968, initially peaked nationally at No. 123 (and at No. 7 on both Los Angeles station KHJ-AM and San Diego station KGB-AM), while the longer, original album version spent three weeks on the singles chart in 1970, peaking at No. 99, according to Joel Whitburn's Top Pop Singles: 1955–2010.

MacLean's composition (as well as the recording itself) has come to be considered a classic. In 2004, "Alone Again Or" came in at No. 436 in the Rolling Stone 500 Greatest Songs of All Time poll. In the magazine's 2010 version, the song ranked at No. 442.

The song has been featured in several films, including the 1996 films Bottle Rocket and Sleepers. It appeared at the close of the 2009 British comedy movie Bunny and the Bull. "Alone Again Or" was also featured in the climactic parade scene ending the last episode of season one of the 2019 Netflix series Russian Doll.

== The Damned version ==
"Alone Again Or"

Single by the Damned

from the album Anything
- B-side: "In Dulce Decorum (Live)"
- Released: 13 April 1987
- Recorded: 1986
- Studio: Hammersmith, Denmark
- Genre: Psychedelic rock; gothic rock
- Length: 3:38
- Label: MCA
- Songwriter: Bryan MacLean
- Producer: Jon Kelly

The Damned singles chronology
"Gigolo" (1987)	"Alone Again Or" (1987)	"In Dulce Decorum" (1987)

"Alone Again Or" was released as a single by English rock band the Damned on 6 April 1987 by MCA Records. They recorded it as an acknowledgement of Love being one of their influences. Boosted by multi-format releases (including the band's first CD single, which included the first release of their version of "Eloise" on this format) and a surreal music video directed by Gerard de Thame, the single peaked at No. 27 in the UK, the Damned's final Top 40 hit to date. The UK B-side "In Dulce Decorum" was recorded live at the Hammersmith Odeon on 12 November 1986.

MCA also issued the single in the United States, their first single to be issued in the territory since "Dr Jekyll & Mr Hyde" in 1981. This release added the studio version of "In Dulce Decorum" in place of the live version on the UK release.

=== Charts ===
Chart (1987)	Peak position
UK Singles (OCC)	27
Album Rock Tracks (Billboard)	50

== Other versions ==
Versions have also been recorded by an eclectic variety of bands and singers including UFO (1977), Sarah Brightman (1990), the Boo Radleys (1991), the Oblivians (1993), Chris Pérez Band (1999), Calexico (2004), Matthew Sweet and Susanna Hoffs (2006), Les Fradkin (2007) and Sara Lov (2014). Two demo versions by MacLean himself were released in 1997 on his album Ifyoubelievein.
