= The Rockfield Files =

2020 EP by The Damned

EP by the Damned
- Released: 16 October 2020
- Recorded: 2019
- Studios: Rockfield Studios, Rockfield, Wales
- Genres: Rock; gothic rock; psychedelic rock
- Length: 17:38
- Labels: Search And Destroy; Spinefarm
- Producer: Tom Dalgety

The Damned chronology
Black Is the Night: The Definitive Anthology (2019)	The Rockfield Files (2020)	Darkadelic (2023)

Singles from The Rockfield Files
- 1. "Black Is the Night" Released: 10 October 2019; 2. "Keep 'Em Alive" Released: 14 August 2020; 3. "Manipulator" Released: 18 September 2020

Professional ratings
Review scores
Source	Rating
Bucketlist Music Reviews	8/10
Classic Rock	8/10
Cryptic Rock	4.5/5 stars
Ox-Fanzine	3.5/5 stars
Rewind It Magazine	3/5 stars
Salad Days	8/10

The Rockfield Files is a four-track EP by English rock band the Damned, released on 16 October 2020. It was released by London-based label Search and Destroy in a joint venture with Spinefarm Records. The EP marks the last recording with longtime drummer Pinch, who left the band in late 2019. The title is a reference to the 1970s American television series The Rockford Files.

== Background ==
In 2019, the Damned returned to Rockfield Studios in Wales, where they had recorded their early 1980s albums The Black Album and Strawberries as well as the Friday 13th EP. The line-up on The Rockfield Files includes three out of four members that were at the original 1980s sessions: vocalist Dave Vanian, guitarist Captain Sensible and bassist Paul Gray. "The surprising thing," Sensible said, "was how long it took us to go back because everything we did there ... came out so splendidly." Unbeknown to the band, The Rockfield Files was to be the last recordings with drummer Pinch, who left after his final show with the band on 27 October 2019.

The Rockfield Files is produced by Tom Dalgety, who has previously worked with, among others, Killing Joke, Pixies, Ghost, and Royal Blood. Sensible said of Dalgety, "Tom was brilliant. He is great with guitars and bass. He makes everything sound good." He added, "It was fun cranking the amp up again after Evil Spirits, which had been more keyboard led."

The EP was released on 16 October 2020, more than a year after it was recorded. Gray said in 2020: "We put a bunch of tracks down last year, in two different visits to Rockfield, and the label chose the songs for this EP. Why it's taken a year to come out, I have no idea."

"Black Is the Night" was previously released as a single in an edited version in October 2019 and also included on Black Is the Night: The Definitive Anthology. "The Spider and the Fly" was originally demoed by Gray in 1996 and intended for the Damned just after he had briefly rejoined the band the same year. The song was not recorded by the Damned at the time, but was dusted off for the Rockfield sessions in 2019. Gray: "I played it to Captain, and he said, "Yeah, that will work well." So he changed it about. He added some really good bits to it."

== Release and reception ==
The EP debuted at No. 19 on the British iTunes charts and reached No. 22 on the Italian iTunes charts. The single "Keep 'Em Alive" reached No. 1 on the Official Vinyl Singles Chart.

Classic Rock wrote, "With a sparkiness that was at times lacking on their previous album, The Rockfield Files is an excellent addition to the catalogue of a band who should have gone to pot about 30 years ago but are still full of vitality." The All In Music Review website called it "perhaps their most accomplished music to date" and "a remarkable effort." They described the EP as "musically aggressive but sophisticated, the songwriting topical as well as literary." Writer Joel Gausten felt that the EP finds the Damned "at the peak of their powers." He wrote, "Bolstered by an intriguing 1960s psychedelic feel throughout the proceeds, the EP showcases some of the strongest Damned material in years." He also felt that, as a collection of songs, the EP falls somewhere between The Black Album and Phantasmagoria.

Rewind It Magazine wrote, ""Keep 'Em Alive" starts off this four track EP promising enough, but ultimately gets lost in its own repetitiveness. But "Manipulator" quickly puts things back into the right direction, while "The Spider and the Fly" and "Black Is the Night" each hearken back to the band's most goth days, with the latter being the overall standout." Louder magazine wrote that it captures the band at "the absolute zenith of their creativity" and called it "one of the finest recordings of their entire career."

== Track listing ==
Songwriting credits adapted from Tidal.

No.	Title	Writer(s)	Length
1.	"Keep 'Em Alive"	Captain Sensible	5:25
2.	"Manipulator"	Paul Gray	3:43
3.	"The Spider and the Fly"	Sensible, Gray	3:51
4.	"Black Is the Night" (Extended)	Dave Vanian	4:39

== Personnel ==
Credits adapted from Tidal.

The Damned

- Dave Vanian − vocals, synthesizer on "Black Is the Night"
- Captain Sensible − guitar
- Monty Oxymoron – keyboards, piano and synthesizer on "Black Is the Night"
- Paul Gray – bass
- Pinch – drums

Technical personnel

- Tom Dalgety − producer, engineer, mixing
