= Tino Casal =

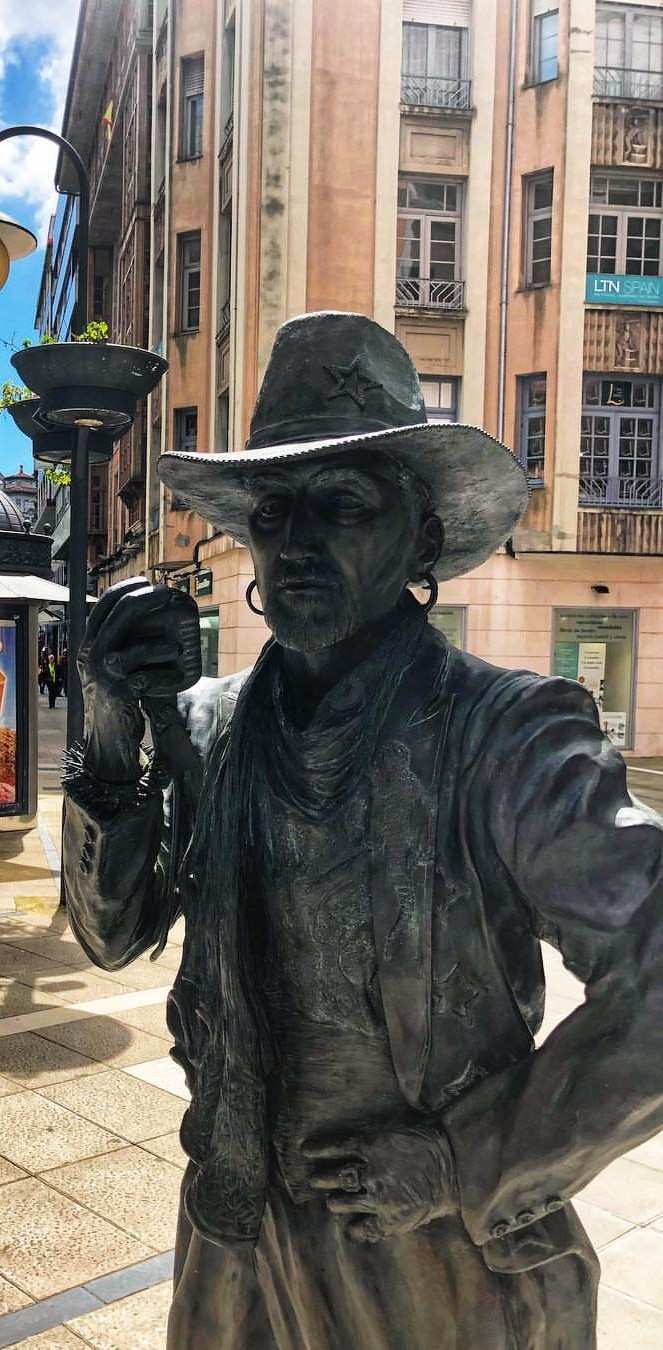

Background information
- Born: José Celestino Casal Álvarez; 11 February 1950; Oviedo, Asturias, Spain
- Died: 22 September 1991 (aged 41) Madrid, Spain
- Genres: Pop, rock, synth-pop
- Occupation: Singer
- Instruments: Singing
- Years active: 1981–1991
- Label: EMI
- Website: Official site

José Celestino Casal Álvarez (11 February 1950 – 22 September 1991), more commonly known as Tino Casal, was a Spanish singer, songwriter and producer, who was active during La Movida Madrileña (English: The Madrid movement). He was one of the most popular singers in the 1980s in Spain, performing with his lavish costumes with sets comparable to Liberace.

== Biography ==
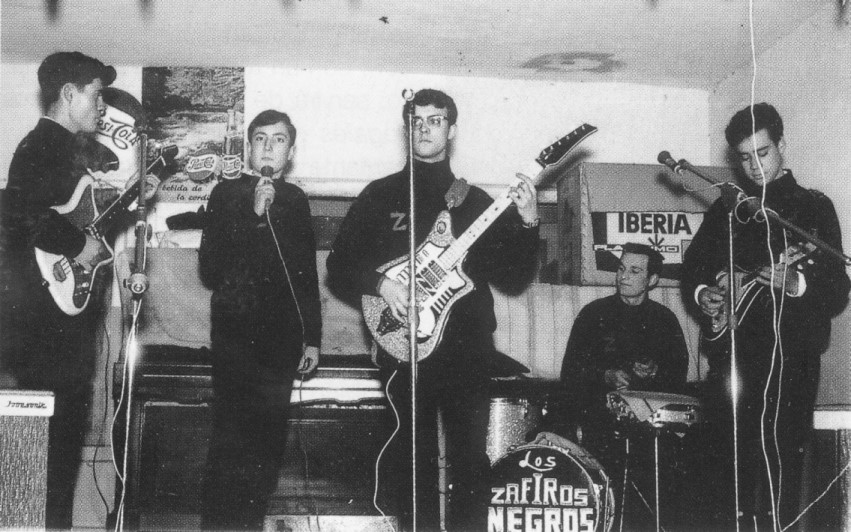
Tino Casal (second from the left) while at the Los Zafiros Negros in 1963.

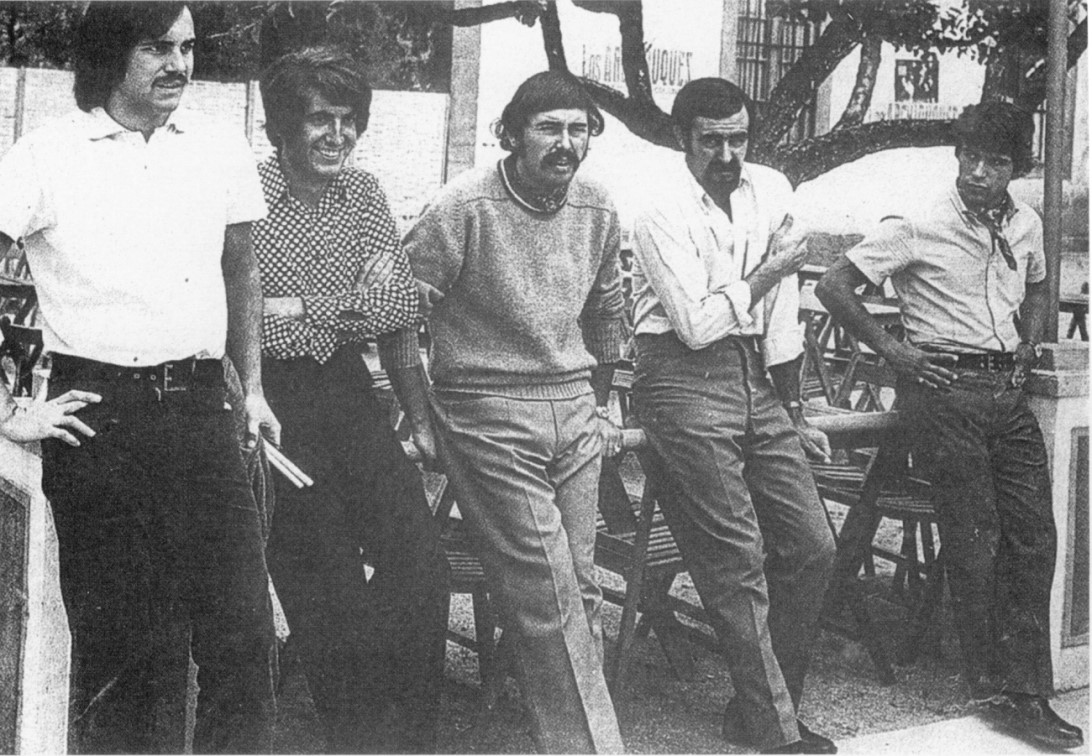
Tino Casal (second from the left) while at the Los Archiduques.

Casal was born in Tudela Veguín, Oviedo, Asturias, and began his musical career, aged 13, in a group called "Los Zafiros Negros" (The Black Sapphires). In 1967 he joined "Los Archiduques" (The Archdukes), replacing their lead singer, who had fallen ill. He then left for London, in order to follow one of his other great passions - painting. It was there, that Casal had his first contact with glam-rock, attracted by the stream led by David Bowie, Sweet and T. Rex among others.

In 1977, after a series of trips abroad, Casal returned to Spain, where he signed a recording contract with Philips when Spanish music lovers were looking for a substitute for well-loved crooners Nino Bravo and Bruno Lomas. During the 1970s, he performed at a number of different music festivals, and in 1978 he took part in the Benidorm Festival, where he won "Best Young Singer" and "Best Musical Composition.".

After breaking his recording contract, Casal threw himself into painting until 1980, when he returned to music, producing other artists, such as Goma de Mascar or the Obús, the first heavy metal group in Spain. EMI took a keen interest in Casal's dual-role and offered him a contract in 1981.

With his new recording contract, Casal took major liberties over his working hours, the main reason why he returned to a musical career. In 1981, he released his first solo effort, Neocasal, produced by Julian Ruiz, which contained the hits "Champú de Huevo" (Egg Shampoo) - his first Number 1 - and "Billy Boy". Although the album had been poorly received by critics, Casal began to find followers. He also continued to produce records for groups, such as Azul y Negro and Obús, and collaborated with filmmaker Pedro Almodóvar, financing the production of the film Laberinto de pasiones (Labyrinth of Passion) which yielded certain famous elements of Casal's appearance, such as his red jacket, originally worn by Imanol Arias.

In 1983 the release of Etiqueta Negra, consolidated Casal's position as a major player on the Spanish music scene with the success of "Embrujada" ("Bewitched") and "Póker para un perdedor" ("Poker for a Loser"). Despite having seen the album sell exceptionally well, Casal decided to edit and re-release the record with additional tracks. The following year, he released "Hielo Rojo" ("Red Ice"), from which appeared the hit single, "Pánico en el edén" ("Panic in the Garden of Eden"). In 1985 suffered from a heavy ankle sprain, whilst touring in Valencia. He chose to ignore medical advice and toured for two further months, self-medicating with anti-inflammatories and analgesics up until the point where he found himself hospitalised and on the brink of death with necrosis in both hips. As a result, Casal used a wheelchair for several months. He was admitted to hospital in August 1985 and after 19 days in the Intensive Care Unit, without food or water, four litres of infectious fluid was removed from his left leg. The original diagnosis of AIDS, was soon dismissed.

=== Reappearance ===
Following a long convalescence, Casal returned in 1987 with a cane and a new album, recorded at Abbey Road Studios. The album, entitled, Lágrimas de cocodrilo (Crocodile Tears), contained his own versions of other artist's songs but also some of his own original recordings. It was produced under the orchestral direction of Julián Ruiz and Andrew Powell, in charge of musical arrangement of Alan Parsons Project. The album's biggest success was the cover of Barry Ryan's "Eloise", which reached number 1 in Los 40 Principales (the Spanish Top 40) and became one of his best-known works. At the time (1988), his was the second biggest-selling album in Spain, behind Descanso Dominical by Mecano.

In October 1989, he released his last album, Histeria, which revisited the main themes of his musical career during the 1970s. After this release, Casal dedicated his latter years to painting and sculpting, in addition to collaborations with other artists. In May, Casal released a compilation album of his greatest hits, Etiqueta Negra, grandes éxitos, and had begun preparations to release another album in 1992, with the intention of recording in Tokyo.

=== Death ===
Casal died on 22 September 1991 in a car accident in Madrid, aged 41. Casal and three other people had been to a nightclub and after having dinner, they made their way to Casal's house to pick up some microphones to bring to a recording studio they wished to visit in Pozuelo, when heavy rain caused the driver of the Opel Corsa they were traveling in to lose control of the car, which crashed into a lamp post after sliding through muddy soil. Casal was in the passenger seat without a seatbelt and was the only fatality. He died while flying on the emergency helicopter which had been sent to the scene. Unsurprisingly, the news was a huge shock to the Spanish music industry. A year later, EMI paid a posthumous tribute to Casal, by re-releasing the compilation album Etiqueta Negra. Other artists, such as Alaska, Marta Sánchez and Stravaganzza have since covered and sampled his songs.

== Discography ==
=== Albums ===
- Neocasal (1981)
- Etiqueta Negra (1983)
- Hielo Rojo (1984)
- Lágrimas de Cocodrilo (1987)
- Histeria (1989)

=== Compilations ===
- Grandes Éxitos: Etiqueta Negra (1991)
- Casal Vive (2000)
- Casal Remixes (2001)
- Casal Único: Antología Audiovisual (2006)
- Tino Casal: The Platinum Collection (2007)
- Todo Casal (2011)
- De la Piel del Diablo – La Colección Definitiva (2016)
