= Thanks for the Night =

Single by the Damned
- B-side: "Nasty"
- Released: 28 May 1984
- Recorded: 1984
- Genre: Punk rock
- Length: 3:30
- Label: Damned; DAMNED 1
- Songwriter: Sensible
- Producer: Hein Hoven

The Damned singles chronology
"Generals" (1982)	"Thanks for the Night" (1984)	"Grimly Fiendish" (1985)

"Thanks for the Night" is a single by the English punk rock band the Damned, released in May 1984.

It was recorded at something of a transitional stage for the group, being the last studio recording completed with Captain Sensible until 2001's Grave Disorder album. It was also the first released recording to feature bass player Bryn Merrick, and also the first with Strawberries keyboardist Roman Jugg as a full member of the band. The song also bore a strong resemblance to the Strawberries album track "Ignite".

The B-side, "Nasty", was recorded for the BBC comedy series The Young Ones, and was performed during the episode of the same name in 1984.

The single was also issued in Germany by Bellaphon Records. While it was not attached to any Damned album, it was later included on several Damned compilations and live albums, as were the B-side tracks.

A version of the song also appeared on Captain Sensible's second solo album The Power of Love (1983).

== Track listing ==
1. "Thanks for the Night" (Sensible) - 3:30
2. "Nasty" (Scabies, Sensible, Vanian, Jugg, Merrick) - 2:51

Bonus track on 12" single:

1. "Do the Blitz" (Scabies, Sensible, Vanian, Gray, Jugg) - 1:55

== Production credits ==
- Producers:
  - Hein Hoven on "Thanks for the Night"
  - The Damned on "Nasty" and "Do the Blitz", credited as "Us for Them Ltd"
- Musicians:
  - Dave Vanian − vocals
  - Captain Sensible − lead guitar
  - Rat Scabies − drums
  - Roman Jugg − rhythm guitar, keyboards
  - Bryn Merrick − bass
