= The Snivelling Shits =

British punk rock band

- Origin: London, England
- Genre: Punk rock
- Years active: 1977–1978
- Labels: Ghetto Rockers, Damaged Goods
- Past members: Giovanni Dadomo; Pete Makowski; Dave Fudger; Barry Myers; Steve Nicol; Steve Lillywhite; Ade Lillywhite; Lou Salvoni; Nick Howell (Ratbite); John Ellis Barry Myers aka DJ Scratchy

The Snivelling Shits were a punk rock group formed in London in 1977, centred on Giovanni Dadomo.

== History ==
Giovanni Dadomo was a music journalist who wrote for publications such as ZigZag, Sounds, The Face and New Music News. He appeared on the British TV programme Nationwide in late 1976 as part of an episode centred on punk rock, where he stated, "The danger of the Sex Pistols is that they can be boring...". In 1977 he recorded the novelty punk record "Terminal Stupid"/"I Can't Come", the latter described as "an iconoclastic mantra of amphetamine-induced sexual dysfunction", backed by guitarist and fellow journalist Dave Fudger and various musicians including members of proto punk pub-rock band Eddie and the Hot Rods, and engineered by Steve Lillywhite, who also played bass guitar for the band. Lillywhite's career as a record producer began to take off and Barry Myers (proto punk and dub roots reggae disc jockey DJ Scratchy who toured with The Clash ) took over on bass. The single was released in late 1977. Dadomo resurfaced in 1977 under the guise of Arthur Comix, with "Isgodaman?" on the Beggars Banquet label compilation Streets. By 1979 The Snivelling Shits had become The Hits and were billed as such on the London club scene; they recorded a Peel Session under that name on 6 June 1978. "I thought we'd just shorten the name" said Dadomo to French musician, cartoonist and writer Bruno Blum, whose Motörhead Rock Commando comic strips (first published in France in Best) he translated to English for publication in New Music News and as a full colour comic book by Motörhead in 1980. He recorded more material which was discovered in the late 1980s and released in 1989 as the I Can't Come album by Damaged Goods Records, described by Maximumrocknroll as "essential for music lovers and music haters alike". He also co-wrote three songs with The Damned - "I Just Can't Be Happy Today" ( which appeared on Machine Gun Ettiquette), "There Ain't No Sanity Clause" (which appeared in demo form on I Can't Come,) and "Dr. Jeckyll And Mr. Hyde."

Dadomo also co-wrote the book New Women in Rock (1982, Delilah/Putnam) with Liz Thompson.

The I Can't Come collection has been described as "punk at its most pristinely putrid", with Allmusic writer Dave Thompson going on to say "the Snivelling Shits reduced every cliché of the era to as few chords as possible, then spattered them with a stupidity that would have been rank if it wasn't so magnificent".

Dadomo died in 1997.

== Discography ==
=== Singles, EPs ===
- "Crossroads" (Note: "Crossroads" is "I'm Waiting for the Man" by The Velvet Underground (1967) with new words.) / "Only 13" (1977) (very limited pressing acetate)
- "Terminal Stupid" / "I Can't Come" (1977) Ghetto Rockers
- "Isgodaman?" / "Terminal Stupid" / "I Can't Come" (1989) Damaged Goods

=== Albums ===
- I Can't Come (1989) Damaged Goods

=== Compilation appearances ===
- "Isgodaman?", on Streets (1977) Beggars Banquet (as Arthur Comix)
