= Grimly Fiendish =

Song by The Damned

Single by the Damned

from the album Phantasmagoria
- B-side: "Edward the Bear"
- Released: 18 March 1985
- Recorded: 1985
- Length: 3:49
- Label: MCA; GRIM 1
- Songwriters: Jugg; Scabies; Vanian; Merrick; Doctor
- Producers: Bob Sargeant; the Damned

The Damned singles chronology
"Thanks for the Night" (1984)	"Grimly Fiendish" (1985)	"The Shadow of Love" (1985)

"Grimly Fiendish" is a single by the English rock band the Damned, released on 18 March 1985.

The band was offered a deal by a major label, MCA, and moved further in the direction of goth music under the influence of guitarist/keyboardist Roman Jugg and vocalist Dave Vanian. Given a substantial promotional budget, including a video directed by Jonathan Gershfield, two separate 12" releases (each featuring a different remix of "Grimly Fiendish") and several limited edition 7" variants, the song was the band's biggest hit since 1979, reaching No. 21 in the UK singles chart in April 1985.

MCA also issued the single in (Germany), Australia and Italy.

== Inspiration ==
The song takes its title (although misspelled for copyright reasons) from a character – Grimly Feendish – The Rottenest Crook in the World – in the UK children's Wham!, Pow! and Smash! comics from the 1960s, as well as Cor!, Shiver & Shake, Monster Fun and Buster in the 1970s and 1980s.

Created by Leo Baxendale, Grimly is an over-ambitious and generally incompetent, childlike criminal mastermind, who is often shown wearing a long, black coat, starting initially as the villainous foil to Eagle-Eye, Junior Spy. Although popular enough to merit his own strip, the regular restructuring or shelving of his strip due to the comics he appeared in being merged with others meant that he never achieved longevity in any single publication, though he was a staple in many IPC/Fleetway comic annuals until the 1980s.

The inspiration behind the song is a throwaway remark by a BBC Radio One DJ, who wondered whether anyone still remembered the character. The lyrics depict Grimly on trial for being a bad influence on children, but protesting that he was never given much of a chance (an allegory to his fate in the comic world).

== Track listing ==
1. "Grimly Fiendish" (Jugg, Scabies, Vanian, Merrick, Doctor) – 3:49
2. "Edward the Bear" (Scabies, Vanian, Jugg, Merrick) – 3:37

Bonus track on 12" single, version 1: –

1. "Grimly Fiendish (Spic 'n' Span Mix)" (Jugg, Scabies, Vanian, Merrick, Doctor) – 5:23

Bonus track on 12" single, version 2: –

1. "Grimly Fiendish (The Bad Trip Mix)" (Jugg, Scabies, Vanian, Merrick, Doctor) – 5:09

== Production credits ==
- Producers:
  - Bob Sargeant
  - The Damned
- Musicians:
  - Dave Vanian − vocals
  - Rat Scabies − drums
  - Roman Jugg − guitar, vocals on "Edward the Bear", keyboards
  - Bryn Merrick − bass
  - Willy Algar – Trumpet
- Additional songwriters:
  - Doctor – lyrics (Doctor is the Reverend Doctor Clive Jackson of Doctor and the Medics)
