= Doctor and the Medics =

British glam rock band

- Doctor and the Medics in 1986

Background information
- Origin: London, England
- Genres: Neo-psychedelia; glam rock; new wave; pop rock
- Years active: 1981–present
- Labels: Whaam; Illegal; I.R.S.; Plastic Surgery
- Members: The Doctor; Melissa Weekes; Adrian Hill; Dan Angelow; Matthew Angelow; Jon Randle; Maria Verhelst-Hopkins
- Past members: Steve McGuire; Richard Searle; Andrew McLachlan; Steve "Vom" Ritchie; Wendi Anadin (Wendi West); Colette Anadin (Colette Appleby); Carl Axon; James Hartley
- Website: www.doctorandthemedics.com

Doctor and the Medics is a British glam rock band formed in London in 1981. The group was most successful during the 1980s and is best known for their cover of Norman Greenbaum's "Spirit in the Sky," which reached No. 1 in the UK Singles Chart. The band currently performs with a newer and established line-up. As well as previously being classed a tribute act to various artists, they include many of their original songs in their live set. The group's musical style includes neo-psychedelia, glam rock, new wave and pop rock.

== Career ==
The Doctor and the Medics lead singer – Clive Jackson, born 7 July 1961 in Knotty Ash, Liverpool– a former London-based DJ, formed the group in 1981 with guitarist Steve McGuire, drummer Vom, also known as Steve Ritchie, bassist Richard Searle and female dancers and singers the Anadin Brothers. The group adopted a look inspired by both 1960s psychedelia and kabuki make-up similar to that of Kiss.

Their first single was "The Druids Are Here, " released on Whaam Records in 1982. They released no further records until 1985, but a four-track EP recorded live at Alice in Wonderland, a Soho nightclub where the Doctor was house DJ, was available direct from the band. The band's female backing singers, known as the Anadin Brothers, were originally three in number, but reduced to two members - Wendi West and Colette Appleby.

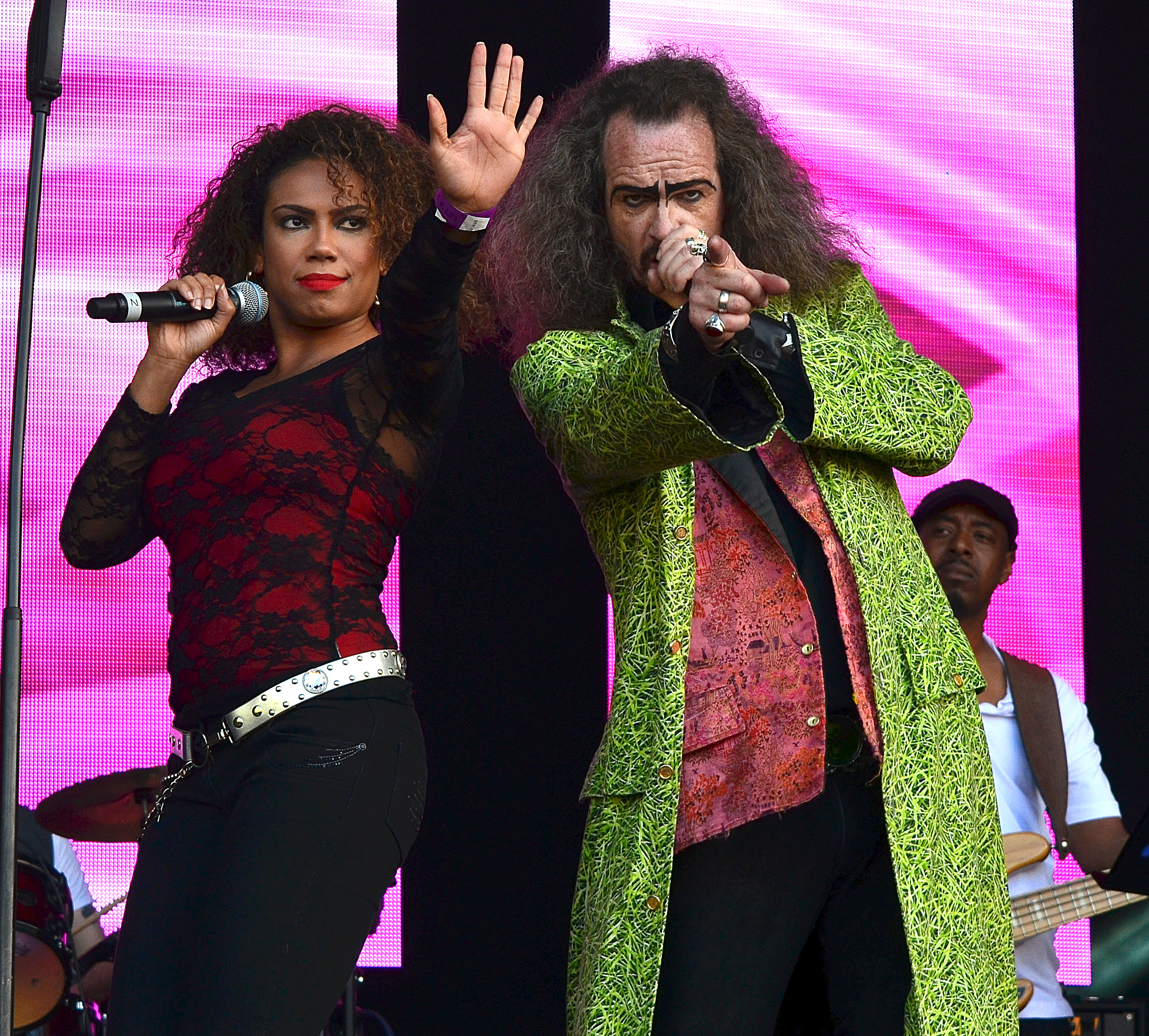
Melissa Weekes and the Doctor performing in June 2014

In 1985, they signed to IRS Records and released "Happy but Twisted", a five-track 12" EP including a cover of Hawkwind's "Silver Machine". This reached number 2 on the indie charts. It was followed by "The Miracle of the Age", produced by Andy Partridge of XTC. Around this time, the band performed a concert in a television studio in Limehouse, London, which was recorded for television broadcast, although it was not shown at the time. At this concert, the line-up was augmented by Roman Jugg of the Damned on keyboards and second guitar. There was another connection between the two groups; as "Doctor", Clive Jackson co-wrote The Damned's 1985 UK hit single "Grimly Fiendish".

In 1986, the band had an international hit with their next single, a cover of Norman Greenbaum's "Spirit in the Sky". The single reached number one in the UK. Their subsequent singles were less successful; "Burn" and "Waterloo" (the latter of which was a cover of the ABBA hit, with Roy Wood on saxophone, backing vocals and in the video). "Burn" reached number 29 in the UK Singles Chart and "Waterloo" reached number 45. The band released their final studio album Instant Heaven, in 1996 on their own 'Madman' record label.

In the early 2000s, the band's current line-up appeared on retro-themed British TV shows such as ITV1's Hit Me Baby One More Time, and a Top of the Pops Christmas special celebrating 50 years of the UK Singles Chart. In June 2006, the band appeared, with a new line-up, on Channel 4's Bring Back One Hit Wonders. Around this time they released an EP called Timewarped. They continue to perform live.

In December 2024, they played the Barrowland Ballroom supporting The Damned on their UK tour.

== Personnel ==
1981 line-up

- The Doctor (Clive Jackson) (vocals)
- Steve McGuire (guitar)
- Richard Searle (bass)
- Andrew McLachlan (drums)

1986 line-up

- The Doctor (vocals)
- Steve McGuire (guitar)
- Richard Searle (bass)
- Steve "Vom" Ritchie (drums)
- Wendi Anadin (vocals)
- Colette Anadin (vocals)

Richard Searle left in 1990, shortly after Vom Ritchie departed. Gareth Thomas replaced Searle in 1990. Searle went on to form the acid jazz band Corduroy with former members of the Sire Records act Boys Wonder. Since leaving the Medics, drummer Ritchie has played with Last of the Teenage Idols, Stiv Bators, B-Bang Cider, the Boys, Wet Dog and now plays with Die Toten Hosen.

2003 reunion line-up

- The Doctor (vocals)
- Adrian Hill (drums)
- Carl Axon (The Big Bopper) (lead guitar, backing vocals)
- James Hartley (guitar)
- Jon Randle (bass)
- Melissa Weekes (backing vocals)
- Colette Anadin (backing vocals)
- Paul Nevin (performance artist)

Carl Axon left to pursue business interests.

Current line-up

- The Doctor (vocals)
- Adrian Hill (drums)
- Dan Angelow (guitar)
- Jon Randle (bass)
- Melissa Weekes (vocals)
- Matthew Angelow (guitar/performance artist)
- Maria Verhelst-Hopkins (vocals/performance artist)

== Discography ==
=== Albums ===
Year	Album	Label	Peak chart positions	
Year	Album	Label	UK	CAN
1986	Laughing at the Pieces	I.R.S. Records	25	55
1987	I Keep Thinking It's Tuesday	I.R.S. Records	—	—
1992	The Adventures of Boadacea and the Beetle	Dojo Limited	—	—
1996	Instant Heaven	Mad Man Records	—	—
2026	tHE oPTIMAL mYSTIC	Mad Man Records	—	—
"—" denotes releases that did not chart.

=== Singles ===
Year	Title (A-side / B-side)	Peak chart positions			Certifications
Year	Title (A-side / B-side)	US Pop	UK	CAN	Certifications
1982	"The Druids Are Here" / "The Goats Are Trying to Kill Me"	―	―	―	
1985	"The Miracle of the Age" / "I Don't Want to Be Alone with You Tonight"	―	117	―	
1986	"Spirit in the Sky" / "Laughing at the Pieces"	69	1	1	BPI: Silver
1986	"Burn" / "Captain Frazer"	―	29	―	
1986	"Waterloo" / "Damaged Brains" (featuring Roy Wood)	―	45	―	
1987	"More" / "Bad Men's Pennies"	―	―	―	
1987	"Burning Love" / "Waterloo"	―	―	―	
1988	"Drive, He Said" / "Ride the Beetle"	―	―	―	
1990	"Hi Ho Silver Lining" / "Black & Blue"	―	―	―	
1991	"Black & Blue"	―	―	―	
2015	"You Spin Me Round (Like a Record)"	―	―	―	
"—" denotes releases that did not chart or were not released in that territory.

=== EPs ===
- Happy But Twisted EP (1985), Illegal - UK Indie No. 2 UK Singles Chart No. 151
  - (Happy Side: "Happy But Twisted"/"Round and Round"/"Auntie Evil's Dormitory")
  - (Twisted Side: "Mole Catcher" / "Silver Machine")
- Two Pieces of Cloth Carefully Stitched Together (1987), Illegal - UK Indie No. 34
  - (Before Side: "Sound of Chains" / "Perfect World")
  - (After Side: "Silver King" / "Age of Gold")
- Timewarped (2006) – 6-track covers EP
- Never Forever (2024) 6-track EP

=== Music videos ===
- "Spirit in the Sky" (1986)
- "Burn" (1986)
- "Waterloo" (1986)
- "More" (1987)
- "Burning Love" (1987)

=== Other appearances ===
- Phantasmagoria (album) - The Damned (1985), MCA Records
  - (features the song "Grimly Fiendish", co-written with the Doctor)
- Live at the Alice & Wonderland: A Pretty Smart Way to Catch a Lobster (1986), Flicknife Records (re-issued by Madman for CD)
  - (features the band as 'Gwyllym & the Raspberry Flavoured Cat' performing "These Boots Are Made for Walking" (Live) and "Gloria" (Live) and some DJ links by the Doctor)
- "Let It Be" / "Let It Be (The Gospel Jam Mix)" - Ferry Aid (1987), The Sun
  - (12" version: "Let It Be" / "Let It Be (Mega Message Mix)", contains a message from the Doctor and the Anadin Brothers)

== See also ==
- Reading and Leeds Festivals line-ups
