= Damned Damned Damned =

Studio album by the Damned
- Released: 18 February 1977
- Recorded: September and December 1976 – January 1977
- Studios: Pathway Studios, London
- Genres: Punk rock; garage rock
- Length: 31:32
- Label: Stiff
- Producer: Nick Lowe

The Damned chronology
Damned Damned Damned (1977)	Music for Pleasure (1977)

Singles from Damned Damned Damned
- 1. "New Rose" Released: 22 October 1976; 2. "Neat Neat Neat" Released: 18 February 1977

Damned Damned Damned is the debut studio album by the English punk rock band the Damned. It was released on 18 February 1977 by Stiff Records. Produced by Nick Lowe, Damned Damned Damned was the first album released by a UK punk group. The album peaked at No. 34 on the UK albums chart.

== Background and production ==
After the success of "New Rose" and a tour with the Sex Pistols, the Heartbreakers and the Clash, the band went into Pathway Studios to record the album Damned Damned Damned with producer Nick Lowe, who had previously recorded "New Rose" with them. Following 10 days of recording, the mix was completed on 15 January 1977, the day the master tapes were compiled.

== Album cover ==
The album cover features the four members of the band after they were hit by pies. Guitarist Brian James recalled: "That was organised by this photographer called Peter Kodick, Stiff Records had assigned him to do the thing. They thought it was a jolly wheeze to surprise us with a few cream cakes, little knowing that we would relish it, get into it and enjoy the whole experience". After the photo session, Damned bassist Captain Sensible noted: "... I had more pie on my face than any of the other buggers and on the back of the sleeve I had my back to the picture, so I went down a photo booth and got some pictures, cut one out and said 'put that on there' so I would have something to show my relatives, because I didn't think we'd be invited to make another album". Stiff, however, used a different photo than the one Sensible gave to the label.

Stiff deliberately printed a limited number of initial copies of the LP with a photo of Eddie and the Hot Rods on the back of the album cover, rather than the Damned playing at The Roxy. An "erratum" sticker was also put on the back cover, and on the front of the LP - on top of the original shrink wrap - was a red "food-fight" sticker that said "Damned Damned", thus completing the LP title when read underneath the band's name. Stiff was known for such unusual promotional activity. As of 2020, a copy of this rare print which still had both stickers and the shrink wrap intact (slit-open or sealed) fetched £650–£1500, depending on condition.

The album design was credited to Big Jobs Inc, a pseudonym of Barney Bubbles.

== Release and reception ==
Damned Damned Damned was issued by Stiff Records on 18 February 1977, which was also James' 26th birthday.

Professional ratings
Review scores
Source	Rating
AllMusic	5/5 stars
Mojo	4/5 stars
NME	8/10
PopMatters	9/10
Q	4/5 stars
Record Collector	5/5 stars
Record Mirror	5/5 stars
The Rolling Stone Album Guide	3.5/5 stars
Sounds	5/5 stars
Uncut	8/10

In a contemporary review for NME, Chris Welch praised the Damned's musical ability, opining that the band have "all the residual skills needed for the actual performance of exhausting modern music". Welch remarked that James was the most effective powerhouse guitarist since Pete Townshend and concluded that the album as a whole was "a highly professional production and is much more convincing than some other new wave bands I've heard on record."

In a 1980 Trouser Press review of Machine Gun Etiquette, Ira Robbins described Damned Damned Damned as "instant obsolescence despite near-perfection".

BBC Music's retrospective review praised the album's energy, pop satire and general humour, with reviewer Chris Jones commenting, "Each track featured the hammering toms of Rat Scabies and Captain Sensible's bass-as-guitar propelling Brian James' exhilarating machine gun axe into your living room".

The American press has also favored the album. Ned Raggett of AllMusic called it "a stone classic of rock & roll fire" and declared that "Damned Damned Damned is and remains rock at its messy, wonderful best." In a review of the Damned's 2001 album Grave Disorder, Pitchfork critic Joe Tangari cited Damned Damned Damned and 1979's Machine Gun Etiquette as the only two Damned albums that he found "very good".

== Track listing ==
All tracks are written by Brian James, except where noted.

No.	Title	Writer(s)	Length
1.	"Neat Neat Neat"		2:46
2.	"Fan Club"		3:00
3.	"I Fall"		2:08
4.	"Born to Kill"		2:37
5.	"Stab Yor Back"	Rat Scabies	1:03
6.	"Feel the Pain"		3:37
7.	"New Rose"		2:44
8.	"Fish"	Brian James, Tony James	1:38
9.	"See Her Tonite"		2:29
10.	"1 of the 2"		3:10
11.	"So Messed Up"		1:55
12.	"I Feel Alright" (cover of "1970" by The Stooges)	Dave Alexander, Ron Asheton, Scott Asheton, Iggy Pop	4:26

=== 30th Anniversary expanded edition ===
Adapted from the album's liner notes.

The first disc contains the twelve tracks from the original album.

Disc 2
No.	Title	Writer(s)	Recording and release date	Length
1.	"I Fall"		Demo, recorded June 1976	2:56
2.	"See Her Tonite"		Demo, recorded June 1976	2:40
3.	"Feel the Pain"		Demo, recorded June 1976	5:11
4.	"Help"	John Lennon, Paul McCartney	B-side, released 25 October 1976	1:43
5.	"Stab Yor Back"	Scabies	Peel Session, recorded 30 November 1976	0:59
6.	"Neat Neat Neat"		Peel Session, recorded 30 November 1976	2:39
7.	"New Rose"		Peel Session, recorded 30 November 1976	2:40
8.	"So Messed Up"		Peel Session, recorded 30 November 1976	2:28
9.	"I Fall"		Peel Session, recorded 30 November 1976	2:10
10.	"Singalongascabies"	Scabies	B-side, released 28 February 1977	1:00
11.	"Fan Club"		Peel Session, recorded 5 May 1977	3:03
12.	"Feel the Pain"		Peel Session, recorded 5 May 1977	3:33
13.	"Stretcher Case Baby"	James, Scabies	Peel Session, recorded 5 May 1977	1:48
14.	"Sick of Being Sick"		Peel Session, recorded 5 May 1977	2:29
15.	"I Feel Alright"	Alexander, Asheton, Asheton, Pop	In Concert, recorded for the BBC 19 May 1977	4:49
16.	"Born to Kill"		In Concert, recorded for the BBC 19 May 1977	3:01
17.	"Sick of Being Sick"		In Concert, recorded for the BBC 19 May 1977	2:50
18.	"Neat Neat Neat"		In Concert, recorded for the BBC 19 May 1977	2:56
19.	"Fan Club"		In Concert, recorded for the BBC 19 May 1977	2:55
20.	"Stretcher Case Baby"	James, Scabies	In Concert, recorded for the BBC 19 May 1977	2:26
21.	"Help"	Lennon, McCartney	In Concert, recorded for the BBC 19 May 1977	1:32
22.	"Stab Yor Back"	Scabies	In Concert, recorded for the BBC 19 May 1977	1:02
23.	"So Messed Up"		In Concert, recorded for the BBC 19 May 1977	2:35
24.	"New Rose"		In Concert, recorded for the BBC 19 May 1977	3:26
25.	"Stretcher Case Baby"	James, Scabies	Single, released 3 July 1977	2:14
26.	"Sick of Being Sick"		B-side, released 3 July 1977	1:59

Disc 3
No.	Title	Writer(s)	Recording date	Length
1.	"1 of the 2"		Recorded live at the 100 Club on 6 July 1976	3:41
2.	"New Rose"		Recorded live at the 100 Club on 6 July 1976	2:57
3.	"Alone"		Recorded live at the 100 Club on 6 July 1976	3:50
4.	"Help"	Lennon, McCartney	Recorded live at the 100 Club on 6 July 1976	1:47
5.	"Fan Club"		Recorded live at the 100 Club on 6 July 1976	3:01
6.	"I Feel Alright"	Alexander, Asheton, Asheton, Pop	Recorded live at the 100 Club on 6 July 1976	4:20
7.	"Feel the Pain"		Recorded live at the 100 Club on 6 July 1976	4:46
8.	"Fish"	James, James	Recorded live at the 100 Club on 6 July 1976	1:50
9.	"Circles"	Pete Townshend	Recorded live at the 100 Club on 6 July 1976	4:42
10.	"See Her Tonite"		Recorded live at the 100 Club on 6 July 1976	2:51
11.	"I Fall"		Recorded live at the 100 Club on 6 July 1976	3:08
12.	"So Messed Up"		Recorded live at the 100 Club on 6 July 1976	2:38

Note

Disc 3 was recorded at the Damned's live debut at the 100 Club on 6 July 1976 supporting the Sex Pistols. Recorded on a Sony cassette recorder, hidden in a sports bag, onto a Scotch 120 tape.

== Personnel ==
=== The Damned ===
- Dave Vanian – vocals
- Brian James – guitar, vocals
- Captain Sensible – bass, vocals
- Rat Scabies – drums, vocals

=== Production ===
- Nick Lowe – producer
- Barry "Bazza" Farmer – engineer
- Peter "Kodick" Gravelle – cover photography

== Charts ==
Year	Chart	Peak position
1977	UK Albums Chart	34

== Release history ==
Region	Date
United Kingdom	18 February 1977
United States	16 April 1977
