= Music for Pleasure (The Damned album) =

Studio album by the Damned
- Released: 18 November 1977
- Recorded: August 1977
- Studio: Britannia Row Studios, London
- Genre: Punk rock
- Length: 33:50
- Label: Stiff
- Producer: Nick Mason

The Damned chronology
Damned Damned Damned (1977)	Music for Pleasure (1977)	Machine Gun Etiquette (1979)

Singles from Music for Pleasure
- 1. "Stretcher Case Baby (single version)" Released: July 1977; 2. "Problem Child" Released: September 1977; 3. "Don't Cry Wolf" Released: December 1977

Music for Pleasure is the second studio album by the English punk rock band the Damned. It was released on 18 November 1977 by Stiff Records. The album failed to chart in the UK.

== Background ==
Music for Pleasure was produced by Nick Mason of Pink Floyd. The Damned originally sought out former Pink Floyd member Syd Barrett, but were unsuccessful due to his reclusive lifestyle. In a brief interview for the documentary The Damned: Don't You Wish That We Were Dead (2015), Mason reported the band were accustomed to a much faster recording schedule than he was familiar with from Pink Floyd. The Damned hoped to record several songs on their first day in studio, when Nick Mason would still be fine-tuning the microphone set-up and tuning the drums.

The album featured new member Lu Edmonds on guitar alongside original guitarist Brian James, as well as guest saxophonist Lol Coxhill.

The album was the Damned's last album-length studio release to feature James, who would rejoin the band in the late 1980s and early 1990s for a live album and studio single. It was also the group's final album release on Stiff. On this album, the band moved into more complex song structures while maintaining the punk sound of their debut album.

The sleeve was designed by Barney Bubbles (including the cover painting).

== Release ==
The song "Problem Child" was released on 30 September 1977 by Stiff Records as a preview of Music for Pleasure. The single again failed to chart in the official UK Top 75, though it did reach No. 27 on the NME chart, which used a different sample of record shops. The single was reissued in Stiff's Damned 4 Pack mail-order set. A CD version was issued in the Stiff Singles 1976-1977 box set by Castle Music in 2003. The single was also issued in Germany.

== Critical reception ==
Professional ratings
Review scores
Source	Rating
AllMusic	3.5/5 stars
Record Mirror	4/5 stars
The Rolling Stone Album Guide	2/5 stars
Sounds	4/5 stars

At the time of its release, Music for Pleasure was dismissed by critics as a poor misstep. In a contemporary review, Sounds writer Peter Silverton compared the album to the second albums by the Jam and the Stranglers, where the formula was to "repeat the first album with a few minor modifications, more considered production but almost inevitably with less freshness of impact." He also noted that "mostly they have really extended on the four-piece Wall of Sound style of their first album. And it's not just that they've added a sax player on one track and a second guitarist in the form of the monosyllabic Lu". Silverton responded to negative reception of the album, noting that "they've already been written off by many who should know better but like Mr. Vanian shouts on 'Don't Cry Wolf': 'Don't cry wolf, don't be a fool'".

Trouser Press opined: "With added guitarist Lu Edmonds and no audible stylistic plan, the attack sounds blunted, and there aren't as many great songs as on the first LP. [...] Music for Pleasure doesn't live up to the title." AllMusic's retrospective review was more enthusiastic, deeming the album "a respectable punk artifact", though also "more a historical document than a great LP".

== Track listing ==
All tracks are written by Brian James, except as noted.

Side A
No.	Title	Writer(s)	Length
1.	"Problem Child"	James, Rat Scabies	2:13
2.	"Don't Cry Wolf"		3:15
3.	"One Way Love"		3:44
4.	"Politics"		2:26
5.	"Stretcher Case"	James, Scabies	1:52
6.	"Idiot Box"	Captain Sensible, Scabies	5:00

Side B
No.	Title	Writer(s)	Length
1.	"You Take My Money"		2:04
2.	"Alone"		3:37
3.	"Your Eyes"	James, Dave Vanian	2:53
4.	"Creep (You Can't Fool Me)"		2:12
5.	"You Know"		5:05

CD reissue bonus tracks
No.	Title	Writer(s)	Length
12.	"Help" (Beatles cover)	John Lennon, Paul McCartney	1:43
13.	"Sick of Being Sick"		2:30
14.	"Singalong a Scabies" (instrumental version of "Stab Yor Back")	Scabies	1:01

Notes

- Track 12: B-side of "New Rose". Produced by Nick Lowe at Pathway Studios, London. Released October 1976.
- Track 13: B-side of "Stretcher Case Baby". Produced by Shel Talmy at Roundhouse Recording Studios, London. Released July 1977.
- Track 14: B-side of "Neat Neat Neat". Produced by Nick Lowe at Pathway Studios, London. Released February 1977.

== Personnel ==
The Damned

- Dave Vanian – vocals
- Brian James – lead guitar, backing vocals
- Lu Edmonds – rhythm guitar
- Captain Sensible – bass, slide guitar on "One Way Love", backing vocals
- Rat Scabies – drums

Additional personnel

- Lol Coxhill – saxophone on "You Know"

Technical

- Nick Mason – production
- Nick Griffiths – engineering
- Brian Humphries – engineering
- Barney Bubbles – cover design
- Chris Gabrin – photography
