= The History of the World (Part 1) =

Song by The Damned

Single by The Damned

from the album The Black Album
- B-side: "I Believe the Impossible"; "Sugar and Spite"
- Released: 26 September 1980
- Recorded: 1980
- Genre: New wave; synth-pop
- Length: 3:45
- Label: Chiswick; CHIS 125
- Songwriters: Rat Scabies; Captain Sensible; Paul Gray; Dave Vanian
- Producers: Hans Zimmer; The Damned

The Damned singles chronology
"White Rabbit" (1980)	"The History of the World (Part 1)" (1980)	"There Ain't No Sanity Clause" (1980)

"The History of the World (Part 1)" is a single by the English rock band the Damned, released in September 1980 by Chiswick Records. It was co-produced by the band with Hans Zimmer and was included on the band's The Black Album. The record was released in both 7" and 12" formats, and reached No. 51 in the UK Singles Chart.

== Critical reception ==
Writing in Smash Hits magazine, reviewer David Hepworth wrote, "The Damned seem to be making overtures to the mainstream, knocking timidly on the door of daytime radio and asking to be let in. With keyboards to the fore instead of the usual guitars, this is not unlike the kind of half baked effort you'd expect from Supertramp, if they were trying to grab a bit of new wave credibility".

== Production credits ==
Producers

- Hans Zimmer
- The Damned

Musicians

- Dave Vanian − vocals
- Captain Sensible − guitar, vocals on "I Believe The Impossible"
- Rat Scabies − drums
- Paul Gray − bass
- Hans Zimmer - synthesiser
