= Eloise (Paul Ryan song) =

1968 single by Barry Ryan

Single by Barry Ryan

from the album Barry Ryan Sings Paul Ryan
- B-side: "Love I Almost Found You"
- Released: 4 October 1968
- Studio: IBC (London, England)
- Genre: Baroque pop; progressive pop; orchestral pop
- Length: 5:50 (album version); 5:46 (single version)
- Label: MGM
- Songwriter: Paul Ryan
- Producer: Bill Landis

Barry Ryan singles chronology
"Goodbye" (1968)	"Eloise" (1968)	"Love Is Love" (1969)

"Eloise" is a song first released in 1968 on the MGM label. It was performed by English singer Barry Ryan and written by his twin brother, Paul Ryan. Running for over five minutes, it features strong orchestration, melodramatic vocals, and a brief slow interlude. It sold three million copies worldwide, and reached No. 2 in the UK Singles Chart as published by Record Retailer, but hit No. 1 in the NME and Melody Maker charts. It topped the chart in 17 countries, including Italy, West Germany, the Netherlands and Australia.

The single was released as "Barry Ryan with the Majority". The Majority were a pop band who, for a period, were the backing band for Ryan and who, after renaming to Majority One, had some success in Europe. Ryan also released an Italian-language version of the song, "Eloise (Versione Italiana)", in 1968.

== Background and recording ==
After not being able to cope with the success of some of his hits as a duo with Barry, Paul decided to take a step away from the limelight and to concentrate on songwriting. "Eloise" was the second song he wrote and was influenced by Richard Harris's arrangement of "MacArthur Park" after listening to a rough mix of it at a party at Harris's house. After listening to it, Paul locked himself away and wrote "Eloise" in three days. The song was then recorded at IBC Studios at the end of a recording session with their mother Marion and they had only two takes to do it due to the length of the song. The session musicians included Jimmy Page and John Paul Jones, both of whom went on to form Led Zeppelin, and Glenn Ross Campbell. Everyone then wanted to go to the mixing desk to listen to the result because it was so unusual and they said it was going to be a big hit.

According to Barry Ryan, the record influenced Freddie Mercury of Queen. He said in a 2017 interview: "I remember reading Freddie’s memoirs. He was influenced by it. He really, really liked it and also he used it as an argument to release 'Bohemian Rhapsody' because his record company didn’t want to release it but he said “That Barry Ryan had a big five and half minute hit. Why can’t we do it too?”"

== Charts ==
=== Weekly charts ===
Chart (1968–1969)	Peak position
Australia (Go-Set)	1
Australia (Kent Music Report)	1
Austria (Ö3 Austria Top 40)	2
Belgium (Ultratop 50 Flanders)	1
Belgium (Ultratop 50 Wallonia)	1
Canada Top Singles (RPM)	36
Denmark (Danmarks Radio)	2
Finland (Suomen virallinen lista)	14
France (SNICOP)	1
Ireland (IRMA)	2
Italy (Musica e dischi)	1
Netherlands (Dutch Top 40)	1
Netherlands (Single Top 100)	1
Malaysia (Radio Malaysia)	1
Mexico (Radio Mil)	2
New Zealand (Listener)	1
Norway (VG-lista)	2
Rhodesia (Lyons Maid)	1
Singapore (Radio Singapore)	1
South Africa (Springbok Radio)	2
Spain (AFYVE)	1
Sweden (Kvällstoppen)	8
Switzerland (Schweizer Hitparade)	1
United Kingdom NME	1
UK Singles (Official Charts)	2
US Billboard Hot 100	86
US Cash Box Top 100	50
West Germany (GfK)	1
Yugoslavia (Novi Džuboks)	2

=== Year-end charts ===
Chart (1968)	Position
Belgium (Ultratop Flanders)	66
UK Singles	31

Chart (1969)	Position
Australia (Kent Music Report)	12
Austria (Ö3 Austria)	5
Belgium (Ultratop Flanders)	27
Switzerland (Schweizer Hitparade)	1
West-Germany	1

== The Damned version ==
"Eloise"

Single by the Damned
- B-side: "Temptation"; "Beat Girl"
- Released: 27 January 1986
- Recorded: 14–15 October 1985; 23–24 November 1985
- Studio: October: Music Works (London, England); November: Eel Pie (London, England)
- Length: 5:10
- Label: MCA
- Songwriter: Paul Ryan
- Producer: Jon Kelly

The Damned singles chronology
"Is It a Dream?" (1985)	"Eloise" (1986)	"Anything" (1986)

On the back of the commercial success of the 1985 Phantasmagoria album, English rock band the Damned released their cover of the track as a single in 1986. It reached No. 3 on the UK Singles Chart.

=== Background and release ===
Dave Vanian had been thinking about doing a cover of the song from at least 1980 and in 1985 wanted to do a non-album single. Rat Scabies did not want a third single released from Phantasmagoria, which MCA Records wanted to do. It was decided that "Eloise" could be recorded as long as "Is It a Dream?" was released as the third single.

The single was released in the UK with two different 12-inch mixes. The first was nine and a half minutes long and is known as the 'Extravagant Mix'. The second was shorter, lasting less than seven minutes and was released with the parenthesised 'No Sleep Until Wednesday Mix'. It was also a limited release of 2,000 copies. "Eloise" was not included on any studio albums but has since been issued on several Damned compilations, and it appeared as a bonus track on the 1986 reissued LP versions of Phantasmagoria in Australia, Germany and Italy.

At the same time, a version of "Eloise" by Far Corporation singer Robin McAuley was released. McAuley said that the Damned's version had "got absolutely no chance of making it in the charts". Of the two competing versions at the time, Barry Ryan said that "I like the Damned's version best, it's even better than mine".

=== Recording ===
The backing track was recorded at Music Works Studios in London on 14 and 15 October 1985. There were due to be a further two days of recording at the studios, but they were cancelled due to a death in one of the band's family. The band were very committed to touring, so were unable to continue recording for a while. Recording finally continued on 23 November at Eel Pie Studios, and was finished by the next day. It was then mixed at Swanyard Studios with the help of Stuart Bruce.

Steve Kutner, who signed the Damned to MCA, said that "it was a nightmare track to record", being "originally twice as long as what came out". Scabies was not convinced by the song and said that "it never sounded finished to me" and Roman Jugg said that Vanian had called MCA to ask them not to release it.

=== Reception ===
In Smash Hits, Janice Long wrote, "Paul Ryan's 60s hit pales into insignificance as the Damned go way over the top with the production and Dave Vanian's booming voice."

=== Track listing ===
7-inch: MCA / GRIM 4 (UK)

1. "Eloise" (Ryan) – 5:10
2. "Temptation" (Jugg, Scabies, Vanian, Merrick) – 4:05

12-inch: MCA / GRIMT 4 (UK)

1. "Eloise" – 9:31
2. "Beat Girl" (Barry, Peacock) – 2:21
3. "Temptation" – 4:12

12-inch: MCA / GRIMX 4 (UK)

1. "Eloise" (No Sleep Until Wednesday Mix) – 6:50
2. "Beat Girl" – 2:21
3. "Temptation" – 4:12

12-inch: MCA / MCA-23625 (US & Canada)

1. "Eloise" – 5:10
2. "Beat Girl" – 2:16
3. "Temptation" – 4:05

A shorter extended version of the song has also since been released, with a duration of 7:46.

=== Personnel ===
Musicians

- Dave Vanian − vocals
- Rat Scabies − drums
- Roman Jugg − guitar, keyboards
- Bryn Merrick − bass

Technical

- Jon Kelly – production ("Eloise" only)
- The Damned – production ("Temptation" and "Beat Girl")
- Martin Jackson – design, illustration
- The Leisure Process – design, illustration

=== Charts ===
==== Weekly charts ====
Chart (1986)	Peak position
Australia (Kent Music Report)	8
Europe (European Hot 100 Singles)	34
Ireland (IRMA)	4
New Zealand (Recorded Music NZ)	18
UK Singles (Official Charts)	3
West Germany (GfK)	58

==== Year-end charts ====
Chart (1986)	Position
Australia (Kent Music Report)	78
UK Singles (OCC)	62

=== Certifications ===
Region	Certification	Certified units/sales
United Kingdom (BPI)	Silver	250,000^{^}
^{^} Shipments figures based on certification alone.

== Tino Casal version ==
"Eloise"

Single by Tino Casal

from the album Lágrimas de Cocodrilo
- Language: Spanish
- B-side: "Angel Exterminador"
- Released: 1988
- Recorded: 1987
- Studio: Abbey Road, London
- Genre: Techno-pop; glam rock
- Length: 5:28
- Label: EMI
- Songwriter: Paul Ryan
- Producer: Julián Ruiz

Tino Casal singles chronology
"Teatro de a Oscuridad" (1984)	"Eloise" (1988)	"Oro Negro" (1988)

Spanish musician Tino Casal recorded a techno-pop version in 1987 for his album Lágrimas de Cocodrilo and it was released as the first single from the album in 1988. "Eloise" was one of his biggest hits, managing to be number one for several weeks in Spain and reaching number one on Los 40 Principales in June 1988 . After a long convalescence after having suffered necrosis in both legs due to a badly treated sprain resorting to self-medication, Casal's friend, the announcer and producer Julián Ruiz, suggested that he record "Eloise" to return to the stage.

Over time this song has become a classic of Spanish pop and one of Casal's most remembered songs. The vocals for this song took a week to record in Studio 1 of Abbey Road with the Royal Philharmonic Orchestra, conducted by Andrew Powell. The budget for the recordings was approximately €12,000. The lyrics were adapted by Casal, as well as the costumes for the recording of the videoclip, an aquamarine blue sequin suit. After the success of the song, Tino Casal recorded an extended version of the song at the Eurosonic Studio.

A remix by Pumpin' Dolls was released as a promo single in 2000 by Chrysalis Records to promote the compilation album Casal Vive.

=== Track listings ===
7": EMI / 006 12 2255 7

1. "Eloise" – 5:28
2. "Angel Exterminador" – 4:45

12": EMI / 052 12 2274 6

1. "Eloise" (Version Maxi) – 5:42
2. "Eloise" – 6:08
3. "Angel Exterminador" – 4:45

Promo CD: Chrysalis / PE00061 (2000)

1. "Eloise" (Pumpin' Dolls Radio Edit) – 4:25
2. "Eloise" (Pumpin' Dolls Hyperdrama Club Mix) – 9:08
3. "Eloise" – 5:23

=== Charts ===
Chart (1988)	Peak position
Spain (AFYVE)	1
Spain (Los 40 Principales)	1

== Other versions ==
- In 1968, French pop star Claude François released a French-language version, which was a top 10 hit in France and Belgium, and charted at the same time as Ryan's version. This version was then covered the following year by Donald Lautrec and released in Quebec, where it was a number one hit.
- Also in 1968, Argentine band Los Náufragos released a Spanish-language version as a non-album single.
- In 1969, Tapani Kansa released a Finnish-language version on his eponymous debut album, which went to number 3 in the Finnish charts.
- Johnny Dynamo and Los Leos recorded a Spanish version for Discos Orfeón in 1969 that was very successful in the Mexican market.
- In 1970, Karel Gott released a Czech-language version as a single from his 1969 album Poslouchejte! Karel Gott zpívá Lásku bláznivou a další hity.
- In 1981, German band, the Teens covered the song as a non-album single, which reached number 55 in the German charts.
- In 2006, the Turtles lead singer Howard Kaylan covered the song for his 2006 solo album Dust Bunnies.
- In 2016, a previously unreleased cover of the song was included on the Associates' album The Very Best Of, and is a punky version from an early demo of their debut album The Affectionate Punch.
