= Love Song (The Damned song) =

Single by the Damned

from the album Machine Gun Etiquette
- B-side: "Suicide"; "Noise Noise Noise"
- Released: April 1979
- Recorded: 1979
- Genre: Punk rock; proto-hardcore
- Length: 2:21
- Label: Chiswick; CHIS 112
- Songwriters: Scabies; Sensible; Vanian; Ward
- Producer: Ed Hollis

The Damned singles chronology
"Don't Cry Wolf" (1977)	"Love Song" (1979)	"Smash It Up" (1979)

Official audio
- "Love Song" on YouTube

"Love Song" is a single by the English punk rock band the Damned, released in April 1979. It was the first fruit of the reformed lineup's deal with Chiswick Records, boosted by four variant picture sleeves, each one featuring a member of the band, with an additional 20,000 copies pressed on red vinyl (5,000 for each sleeve). It was the Damned's first top 40 hit, peaking at number 20 in the UK singles chart, and leading to the band's debut on Top of the Pops.

"Love Song" was included on the band's third album, Machine Gun Etiquette.

In February 1982, Chiswick reissued the single on their Big Beat imprint, using only the covers featuring Dave Vanian, Captain Sensible and Rat Scabies (Algy Ward having left the band by this stage).

The single was also issued in France, Germany and the Netherlands.

== Track listing ==
All songs written by Scabies, Sensible, Vanian, Ward.

1. "Love Song" − 2:03
2. "Noise Noise Noise" − 3:10
3. "Suicide" − 3:14

== Production credits ==
Producers

- Ed Hollis

Musicians

- Dave Vanian − vocals
- Captain Sensible − guitar
- Rat Scabies − drums
- Algy Ward − bass
