= Neat Neat Neat =

Song by The Damned

- Cover of the 1977 UK single

Single by the Damned

from the album Damned Damned Damned
- B-side: "Stab Yor Back"; "Singalongascabies"
- Released: 18 February 1977
- Recorded: January 1977
- Studio: Pathway, London
- Genre: Punk rock
- Length: 2:44
- Label: Stiff
- Songwriter: Brian James
- Producer: Nick Lowe

The Damned singles chronology
"New Rose" (1976)	"Neat Neat Neat" (1977)	"Stretcher Case Baby" (1977)

Audio sample
- "Neat Neat Neat": file; help

"Neat Neat Neat" is the second single by the English punk rock band the Damned, released on 18 February 1977 by Stiff Records, simultaneously with their debut studio album Damned Damned Damned.

The single was reissued in Stiff's Damned 4 Pack mail-order set. A CD version was issued in the Stiff Singles 1976–1977 box set by Castle Music in 2003.

The single was also issued in Australia, Ireland, Japan (on Island Records) and New Zealand.

In 2005, Stylus Magazine ranked the song's bassline at No. 33 in their list of the "Top 50 Basslines of All Time".

== Track listing ==
1. "Neat Neat Neat" (James) - 2:44
2. "Stab Yor Back" (Scabies) - 1:01
3. "Singalonga Scabies" (Scabies) - 1:00

== In other media ==
- This song was featured in the video game True Crime: New York City.
- The song can be heard playing on the jukebox in the 2008 season 19 The Simpsons episode, "Love, Springfieldian Style", in the third segment, "Sid and Nancy" (a re-imagining of the 1986 film of the same name), just before a character played by Martin Prince (Russi Taylor) changes it to the Bay City Rollers' "Saturday Night".
- The song appeared in the 2017 film Baby Driver as the soundtrack to a heist and chase.
- The song appeared in "Cherry", a 2019 season 1 episode of Amazon Prime's The Boys.
- The song appeared in the first episode of season 1 of Amazon Prime's Young Sherlock

== Covers ==
- Elvis Costello and the Attractions covered the song. Their version originally appeared as the B-side on a 7" single included with early pressings of 1978's This Year's Model, and was later included as a bonus track on Rhino's 2002 CD reissue of that album.
- Melt-Banana covered the song in the pregap before the first track on the CD version of 1998's Charlie.
- For 5 shows during their World Contamination Tour in 2011, My Chemical Romance covered the song.

== Production credits ==
- Producers:
  - Nick Lowe
- Musicians:
  - Dave Vanian − vocals
  - Brian James − guitar
  - Captain Sensible − bass
  - Rat Scabies − drums
