= Machine Gun Etiquette =

Studio album by the Damned
- Released: 9 November 1979
- Recorded: March–May and July–August 1979 in London, England
- Studios: Sound Suite; Wessex Sound Studios; The Workhouse Studios; Utopia Studios; SGS Studios; Chalk Farm Studios
- Genres: Punk rock; new wave; proto-hardcore; neo-psychedelia
- Length: 35:28
- Label: Chiswick
- Producers: The Damned; Roger Armstrong; Ed Hollis

The Damned chronology
Music for Pleasure (1977)	Machine Gun Etiquette (1979)	The Black Album (1980)

Singles from Machine Gun Etiquette
- 1. "Love Song" Released: April 1979; 2. "Smash It Up" Released: September 1979; 3. "I Just Can't Be Happy Today" Released: November 1979

Machine Gun Etiquette is the third studio album by the English punk rock band the Damned, released on 9 November 1979 by Chiswick Records. The album peaked at No. 31 on the UK Charts.

The album was the group's first since reforming with a new lineup of previous members Dave Vanian on vocals, Captain Sensible on lead guitar, Rat Scabies on drums, plus newcomer Algy Ward of Australian punk band The Saints on bass guitar on his only album with the band.

== Background ==
On Machine Gun Etiquette, the band brought more variety to their usual punk rock to add wide-ranging influences from hard rock and heavy metal to psychedelic rock, a tinge of progressive rock and even classic 1960s rhythm and blues and the record has been described by journalists and fans alike as The Beach Boys meets Motörhead with T. Rex and Judas Priest influences thrown in for good measure. The album also features more fast-paced punk tracks, and has been cited as a 'proto-hardcore' record crucial for the later rise of hardcore punk into the 1980s.

The voice at the album's start is actor Jack Howarth, taken from his 1971 album 'Ow Do, a recording of Lancastrian monologues.

The album features multiple guest musicians. Lemmy plays bass on the band's take on The Sweet's "Ballroom Blitz", which was not on the album at time of release but released as a single; the song was also added to the reissued version of the album. Joe Strummer and Paul Simonon also appear on the album. Philip Lloyd-Smee contributed to the sleeve and logo design work on Machine Gun Etiquette.

== Critical reception ==
Professional ratings
Review scores
Source	Rating
AllMusic	4.5/5 stars
Classic Rock	5/5 stars
Entertainment Weekly	B+
Mojo	4/5 stars
MusicHound Rock: The Essential Album Guide	5/5 stars
Q	4/5 stars
Record Collector	3/5 stars
The Rolling Stone Album Guide	3/5 stars
Uncut	10/10

AllMusic's retrospective review reported that when it was released, Machine Gun Etiquette was "deservedly hailed as another classic from the band". The website praised the variety of styles explored and the group's typically strong wit.

Scott Rowley of Classic Rock magazine, reviewing the 25th Anniversary Edition of the album, defined it as "a riotous, ballsy rush of an album [...] the sound of a band coming into its own", adding that "while the Clash looked to America for inspiration, the Damned remained resolutely British", perhaps ironically given that the front cover depicted the band in a New York street scene at 704 7th Avenue, New York City.

== Track listing ==
All tracks are written by Rat Scabies, Captain Sensible, Dave Vanian and Algy Ward, except as noted.

No.	Title	Writer(s)	Length
1.	"Love Song"		2:21
2.	"Machine Gun Etiquette"		1:48
3.	"I Just Can't Be Happy Today"	Scabies; Sensible; Vanian; Ward; Giovanni Dadomo	3:42
4.	"Melody Lee"		2:07
5.	"Anti-Pope"	Scabies; Sensible; Vanian; Ward; Phillip Burns	3:21
6.	"These Hands"		2:03
7.	"Plan 9 Channel 7"		5:08
8.	"Noise, Noise, Noise"	Scabies; Sensible; Vanian; Ward; Jennet Ward	3:10
9.	"Looking at You" (MC5 cover)	Michael Davis; Wayne Kramer; Fred "Sonic" Smith; Dennis Thompson; Rob Tyner	5:08
10.	"Liar"		2:44
11.	"Smash It Up (Part 1)"		1:59
12.	"Smash It Up (Part 2)"		2:53
Total length:			35:28

1986 CD reissue bonus tracks
No.	Title	Writer(s)	Length
13.	"Ballroom Blitz" (B-side of "I Just Can't Be Happy Today") (Sweet cover)	Mike Chapman; Nicky Chinn	3:30
14.	"Suicide" (B-side of "Love Song")		3:14
15.	"Rabid (Over You)" (B-side of "White Rabbit")	Scabies; Sensible; Vanian; Andy Le Vien	3:41
16.	"White Rabbit" (extended version) (non-album single, 1980)	Grace Slick	5:13
Total length:			51:22

2004 CD reissue bonus tracks

- "Smash It Up (Part 1)" and "Smash It Up (Part 2)" are listed as one track on the CD, as "Smash It Up (Parts 1 and 2)" (track 11).

No.	Title	Writer(s)	Length
12.	"Love Song" (Ed Hollis version) (previously unissued)		2:03
13.	"Noise, Noise, Noise" (Ed Hollis version) (B-side of "Love Song")	Scabies; Sensible; Vanian; Ward; Ward	3:25
14.	"Suicide" (B-side of "Love Song")		3:17
15.	"Smash It Up (Part 2)" (backing track – singalonga Damned) (previously unissued)		2:56
16.	"Smash It Up (Part 4)" (previously unissued)	Sensible	1:57
17.	"Burglar" (B-side of "Smash It Up")		3:33
18.	"I Just Can't Be Happy Today" (DJ edit) (single version)	Scabies; Sensible; Vanian; Ward; Dadomo	3:00
19.	"Ballroom Blitz" (B-side of "I Just Can't Be Happy Today")	Chapman; Chinn	3:28
20.	"Turkey Song" (B-side of "I Just Can't Be Happy Today")		1:32

Video clip
No.	Title	Length
21.	"Plan 9, Channel 7" (previously unissued Chiswick video recording)	6:18
Total length:		61:41

== Personnel ==
Credits adapted from the 2004 CD reissue liner notes.

The Damned

- Dave Vanian – lead vocals
- Captain Sensible – guitars, backing vocals, keyboards, bass ("I Just Can't Be Happy Today", "Smash It Up (Parts 1 & 2)"), bass solo ("Anti-Pope"), mandolin ("Turkey Song"), lead vocals ("Turkey Song")
- Rat Scabies – drums, backing vocals, lead vocals ("Burglar")
- Algy Ward – bass, backing vocals, guitar ("Machine Gun Etiquette", "Liar")

Additional personnel

- Joe Strummer – backing vocals ("Noise, Noise, Noise"), hand claps ("Machine Gun Etiquette")
- Topper Headon – backing vocals ("Noise, Noise, Noise")
- Henry Badowski – backing vocals ("Noise, Noise, Noise")
- Paul Simonon – hand claps ("Machine Gun Etiquette")
- Lemmy Kilmister – bass, backing vocals ("Ballroom Blitz")
- Anthony More – synthesizer ("Rabid (Over You)")

Production and artwork

- Roger Armstrong – producer
- The Damned – producer
- Ed Hollis – producer ("Love Song" (Ed Hollis version), "Noise, Noise, Noise" (Ed Hollis version), "Suicide")
- Alvin Clarke – engineer (Sound Suite)
- Mike Shipley – engineer (Wessex)
- Gary Edwards – engineer (Wessex)
- Jeremy Green – engineer (Wessex)
- Rik Watton – engineer (Workhouse)
- Damian Korner – engineer (Utopia)
- G. H. Wallis – engineer (SGS)
- Vic Keary – engineer (Chalk Farm)
- Phil Smee – artwork
- Alan Ballard – front cover photography
- Mick Young – photography
- Captain Sensible – inner sleeve drawing
- Martin Baker – video director ("Plan 9, Channel 7")

== Certifications ==
Region	Certification	Certified units/sales
United Kingdom (BPI)	Silver	60,000^{^}
^{^} Shipments figures based on certification alone.
