= I Just Can't Be Happy Today =

Song by The Damned

Single by the Damned

from the album Machine Gun Etiquette
- B-side: "Ballroom Blitz"; "Turkey Song"
- Released: 16 November 1979
- Recorded: 1979
- Genre: Punk rock; dark pop; darkwave
- Length: 3:34
- Label: Chiswick; CHIS 120 Motown; CHIS 115
- Songwriters: Captain Sensible; Giovanni Dadomo
- Producers: Roger Armstrong; the Damned

The Damned singles chronology
"Smash It Up" (1979)	"I Just Can't Be Happy Today" (1979)	"White Rabbit" (1980)

"I Just Can't Be Happy Today" is a song by the English punk rock band the Damned from their third studio album, Machine Gun Etiquette (1979). Released as a single in November on Chiswick Records, it peaked at No. 46 in the UK singles chart.

== Production ==
The single was heavily edited for radio airplay, removing the spoken word monologue, though the version on the record is unaltered. The first track on the B-side, a cover of Sweet's "Ballroom Blitz", was recorded with Lemmy of Motörhead fame on bass guitar. "Turkey Song" was not credited on the sleeve.

== Live performances ==
The Damned performed "I Just Can't Be Happy Today" alongside "Smash It Up" on the BBC2 television show The Old Grey Whistle Test in 1979, where they trashed the stage towards the end of the song.

== Track listing ==
1. "I Just Can't Be Happy Today" (Dadomo, Scabies, Sensible, Vanian, Ward) - 2:53
2. "Ballroom Blitz" (Chapman, Chinn) - 3:30
3. "Turkey Song" (Scabies, Sensible, Vanian, Ward) - 1:32

== Production credits ==
Producers

- Roger Armstrong
- The Damned

Musicians

- Dave Vanian − vocals
- Captain Sensible − guitar, keyboards, vocals and Mandolin on "Turkey Song"
- Rat Scabies − drums
- Algy Ward − bass
- Lemmy − bass on "Ballroom Blitz"
