= New Rose =

1976 single by The Damned

Single by the Damned

from the album Damned Damned Damned
- B-side: "Help!"
- Released: 22 October 1976
- Recorded: 1976
- Studio: Pathway (North London)
- Genre: Punk rock; power pop
- Length: 2:39
- Label: Stiff
- Songwriter: Brian James
- Producer: Nick Lowe

The Damned singles chronology
"New Rose" (1976)	"Neat Neat Neat" (1977)

"New Rose" is the first single by the English punk rock band the Damned. It was released on 22 October 1976 by Stiff Records, and in 1977 in the Netherlands, Germany and France. It is notable as the first ever single released by a British punk band.

Written by guitarist Brian James, "New Rose" was also included on the group's full-length debut album, Damned Damned Damned. The deadpan intro by singer Dave Vanian ("Is she really going out with him?") was taken from the 1964 Shangri-Las song "Leader of the Pack".

The single's B-side is a cover of the Beatles' hit "Help!", performed about twice as fast as the original. Both songs became staples of the Damned's live shows, and appeared on various compilations.

"New Rose" was reissued in Stiff's Damned 4 Pack mail-order set. Original copies had a press-out centre, while reissues had a solid centre. Copies from the four-pack had matrix details: "Bilbo tape" handwritten and "AY 50332" printed. A CD version was issued in the Stiff Singles 1976–1977 boxed set by Castle Music in 2003. "Help!" also appeared on Hits Greatest Stiffs (1977).

== Production ==
The song was produced by Nick Lowe. It was recorded at Pathway Studios, London, in one day, according to drummer Rat Scabies, and "Nick Lowe may have taken an extra day to mix it".

== Release ==
"New Rose" was released on 22 October 1976. James stated that Captain Sensible initially wanted the song "I Fall" as the first single. Sensible later said that "I Fall" would have been "even more gobsmacking because it's so snotty and fast".

== Critical reception ==
In a retrospective review in 1992, music critic Dave Thompson heaped praise on the single:

"New Rose" is today rightly revered as one of the greatest songs to emerge from 1970s Britain. More than anything outside of the Pistols, "New Rose" (and its flip, the relentless slaughter of the Beatles' "Help") brought a focus to the still burgeoning punk scene, finally lifting it out of the musical basket it had hitherto shared with the Stooges/Dolls/MC5 axis, and knocking the Feelgoods and Hot Rods-powered pub rock angle clean out of sight. This was no sub-metal snottiness, no high octane R&B revival. Rather, it was the absolute redefinition of all that rock 'n' roll held dear, a stunning return to basics which threw every last iota of expertise and experience to the winds. The band's detractors thought they were smart when they called the Damned's record "primitive." They were way off the mark – the Damned's fans saw it as primeval.

Daniel Ash of Bauhaus and Love and Rockets called the song "the perfect single".

== Track listing ==
1. "New Rose" (Brian James) – 2:46
2. "Help!" (Lennon–McCartney) – 1:43

== Production credits ==
- Producer: Nick Lowe
- Musicians:
  - Dave Vanian − vocals
  - Brian James − guitar
  - Captain Sensible − bass
  - Rat Scabies − drums

== Cover versions ==
"New Rose"

Promotional single by Guns N' Roses

from the album "The Spaghetti Incident?"
- Released: 1993
- Genre: Hard rock
- Length: 2:38
- Label: Geffen
- Songwriter: Brian James
- Producers: Mike Clink; Guns N' Roses

"New Rose"

Song by Rachel Sweet

from the album Protect the Innocent
- Released: 1980
- Genre: New wave
- Length: 2:14
- Label: Stiff
- Songwriter: Brian James
- Producers: Martin Rushent; Alan Winstanley

Guns N' Roses covered the track on their 1993 covers album The Spaghetti Incident? When asked about the Guns N' Roses cover, Damned bass guitarist Captain Sensible said that he had not heard it because he does not listen to music released after 1980. The song was released as a promo single in 1993. Duff McKagan, who performs the lead vocals on the track, has performed the song live with his various solo projects and with Guns N' Roses after he rejoined in 2016.

Rachel Sweet covered the song on her 1980 album Protect the Innocent. A cover by Orange Goblin was included on the compilation album Sucking the 70's – Back in the Saddle Again. Gumball covered it "with punkish fervor" (per reviewer Brenda Hermann) on their 1992 EP Wisconsin Hayride.
