= Phantasmagoria (The Damned album) =

Studio album by the Damned
- Released: 15 July 1985
- Recorded: March–June 1985
- Studio: Eel Pie, London
- Genre: Gothic rock
- Length: 39:19
- Label: MCA
- Producer: Jon Kelly; Bob Sargeant; the Damned

The Damned chronology
| Strawberries (1982) | Phantasmagoria (1985) | Anything (1986) |

Singles from Phantasmagoria
- 1. "Grimly Fiendish" Released: 18 March 1985; 2. "The Shadow of Love" Released: 10 June 1985; 3. "Is It a Dream?" Released: 9 September 1985

Professional ratings
Review scores
| Source | Rating |
|---|---|
| AllMusic | 3.5/5 stars |

Phantasmagoria is the sixth studio album by the English rock band the Damned, released by MCA on 15 July 1985. Special editions were available on white vinyl or picture disc; some versions included a free 12-inch of their UK No. 3 hit "Eloise". It is the first album by the band without original member Captain Sensible, and was a style shift to gothic rock compared to the band's punk sound of its early career.

== Background and production ==
After much wrangling, the Damned received a new contract with MCA Records in October 1984 on the strength of the song "Grimly Fiendish", issued as a single the following March. They recorded the album in Eel Pie Studios from March to June 1985. It reached No. 11 in the charts, and was the band's highest-charting album ever, until the release of Evil Spirits in 2018, which cracked the top-ten at No. 7. The non-album single "Eloise," (a Barry Ryan cover), released six months later, became a huge UK hit, reaching No. 3.

The Damned centred the entire album around David Vanian's deep voice, giving much of the album a gothic feeling. The album was remastered and reissued by Geffen Records in Japan in 2007, featuring replicas of the LP's outer and inner sleeves and a CD label resembling the white vinyl edition. In 2009, an expanded edition was issued by Universal Music Group in Europe.

== Release ==
The song "The Shadow of Love" was released by MCA on 10 June 1985, printed in several formats, with the 10" and 12" versions featuring different mixes of "The Shadow of Love", as well as a bonus track, "Would You". Limited numbers of the 7" single included a bonus record, featuring Rat Scabies' solo single "Let There Be Rats", previously only available via mail order. The song was promoted with the help of a video directed by Peter Cornish, and reached No. 25 in the UK charts. MCA also issued the single in Germany, with the German 7" featuring a slightly different mix of "The Shadow of Love".

The next single, "Is It a Dream?", was released in September 1985 by MCA Records. The Phantasmagoria version was remixed slightly by Jon Kelly for single release, and was backed with several live tracks recorded at the Woolwich Coronet during the band's 11 July 1985 gig. "Is It a Dream?" reached No. 34 in the UK Singles Chart. Two different music videos were made for the song, one directed by Peter Cornish and a second video featuring live performance footage. MCA also issued the single in Australia, Germany, Spain, South Africa and Zimbabwe.

== Artwork ==
The cover image of Susie Bick was taken by photographer Bob Carlos Clarke at Kensal Green Cemetery, Harrow Road.

== Track listing ==
All tracks are written by Dave Vanian, Rat Scabies, Roman Jugg and Bryn Merrick, except where noted.

| No. | Title | Writer(s) | Length |
|---|---|---|---|
| 1. | "Street of Dreams" | | 5:38 |
| 2. | "Shadow of Love" | | 3:51 |
| 3. | "There'll Come a Day" | | 4:15 |
| 4. | "Sanctum Sanctorum" | | 6:27 |
| 5. | "Is It a Dream?" | Vanian, Scabies, Jugg, Merrick, Captain Sensible | 3:27 |
| 6. | "Grimly Fiendish" | Vanian, Scabies, Jugg, Merrick, Clive "Doctor" Jackson | 3:50 |
| 7. | "Edward the Bear" | | 3:37 |
| 8. | "The Eighth Day" | | 3:46 |
| 9. | "Trojans" | | 4:53 |
| Total length: | | | 39:19 |

CD bonus tracks
| No. | Title | Writer(s) | Length |
|---|---|---|---|
| 10. | "Grimly Fiendish" (The Bad Trip Mix) | Vanian, Scabies, Jugg, Merrick, Jackson | 5:11 |
| 11. | "The Shadow of Love" (Ten Inches of Hell Mix) | | 6:41 |
| Total length: | | | 51:39 |

Note

- The non-album single "Eloise" appeared as a bonus track on the 1986 re-issued LP versions in Australia, Germany and Italy.

=== 2009 expanded edition ===
Disc 1 bonus tracks
| No. | Title | Writer(s) | Place of Origin | Length |
|---|---|---|---|---|
| 10. | "Grimly Fiendish (The Bad Trip Mix)" | Vanian, Scabies, Jugg, Merrick, Jackson | "Grimly Fiendish" 12" | 5:10 |
| 11. | "The Shadow of Love (Ten Inches of Hell Mix)" | | "The Shadow of Love" 10" | 6:42 |
| 12. | "Is It a Dream (Wild West Express Mix)" | Vanian, Scabies, Jugg, Merrick, Sensible | "Is It a Dream" 12" | 6:45 |

Disc 2
| No. | Title | Writer(s) | Place of Origin | Length |
|---|---|---|---|---|
| 1. | "Grimly Fiendish (Spic 'n' Span Mix)" | Vanian, Scabies, Jugg, Merrick, Jackson | "Grimly Fiendish" 12" | 5:21 |
| 2. | "Edward the Bear" (B-side single version) | | "Grimly Fiendish" 7" | 3:53 |
| 3. | "The Shadow of Love (The Pressure Mix)" | | "The Shadow of Love" 12" | 5:34 |
| 4. | "Nightshift" (B-side) | | "The Shadow of Love" 7" | 2:24 |
| 5. | "Let There Be Rats" (Rat Scabies solo single) | Scabies | "The Shadow of Love" 7" double pack single | 2:09 |
| 6. | "Wiped Out" (Rat Scabies solo single) | Scabies | "The Shadow of Love" 7" double pack single | 1:34 |
| 7. | "Would You" (B-side) | Vanian, Scabies, Jugg, Merrick, Vivian Mason | "The Shadow of Love" 12" | 2:46 |
| 8. | "Is It a Dream (Wild West End Mix)" | Vanian, Scabies, Jugg, Merrick, Sensible | "Is It a Dream" 7" | 8:11 |
| 9. | "Street of Dreams" (Live) | | "Is It a Dream" 7" | 5:05 |
| 10. | "Curtain Call" (Live) | Vanian, Scabies, Sensible, Paul Gray | "Is It a Dream" 12" | 4:27 |
| 11. | "Pretty Vacant" (Live) | Paul Cook, Steve Jones, Glen Matlock, Johnny Rotten | "Is It a Dream" 12" | 2:04 |
| 12. | "Wild Thing" (Live) | Chip Taylor | "Is It a Dream" 12" | 2:14 |
| 13. | "The Shadow of Love" (BBC Radio 1 session) | | The Radio One Sessions, 1996 | 4:05 |
| 14. | "Is It a Dream" (BBC Radio 1 session) | Vanian, Scabies, Jugg, Merrick, Sensible | The Radio One Sessions | 3:36 |
| 15. | "Street of Dreams" (BBC Radio 1 session) | | The Radio One Sessions | 4:43 |

Notes

- "Edward the Bear" (single version) is produced by Bob Sargeant and the Damned.
- "Nightshift" and "Would You" are produced by the Damned.
- "Let There Be Rats" and "Wiped Out" were originally released as a Rat Scabies 7" solo single in 1984; produced by Will Birch.
- Live tracks recorded at Woolwich Coronet, 11 July 1985; engineered and mixed by Jon Kelly; all tracks feature Paul Shepley on keyboards; "Pretty Vacant"and "Wild Thing" features Rat Scabies on guitar and Roman Jugg on drums.
- "The Shadow of Love", "Is It a Dream" and "Street of Dreams" recorded for Janice Long Session, 14 April 1985; produced by Harry Parked, engineered by Barry Adams and Peter Watts.

== Personnel ==
The Damned

- Dave Vanian – lead vocals
- Roman Jugg – guitar, keyboards, lead vocals (7), backing vocals
- Bryn Merrick – bass, backing vocals
- Rat Scabies – drums

Additional musicians

- Paul Shepley – additional keyboards (8)
- Andy Richards – additional keyboards
- Luís Jardim – percussion
- Gary Barnacle – saxophone and brass
- Steve Nieve – keyboard inspiration (4)

Production

- Jon Kelly – production, engineering (except 6)
- Chris Ludwinsky – additional engineering
- Bob Sargeant – production (6)
- The Damned – production (6)
- Bob Carlos Clarke – cover photography
- Booce – cover artwork

== Certifications ==
| Region | Certification | Certified units/sales |
|---|---|---|
| United Kingdom (BPI) | Silver | 60,000^{^} |
^{^} Shipments figures based on certification alone.
