= Smash It Up =

Song by The Damned

Single by the Damned

from the album Machine Gun Etiquette
- B-side: "Burglar"
- Released: 12 October 1979
- Recorded: 1979
- Genre: Punk rock; rock and roll; hard rock; pop-punk
- Length: 2:53
- Label: Chiswick; CHIS 116
- Songwriters: Dave Vanian; Captain Sensible; Rat Scabies; Algy Ward
- Producers: Roger Armstrong; The Damned

The Damned singles chronology
| "Love Song" (1979) | "Smash It Up" (1979) | "I Just Can't Be Happy Today" (1979) |

"Smash It Up" is a song by the English punk rock band the Damned, released as a single on 12 October 1979 by Chiswick Records. It is considered the band's unofficial anthem.

The single was the second release from the band's third studio album Machine Gun Etiquette (1979), where it was listed as "Smash It Up (Part II)". The B-side of the single was "Burglar".

== Production ==
"Smash It Up" was produced by the band and Roger Armstrong. It is structured in two-part form: a melodic instrumental introduction (written in homage to Marc Bolan after his tragic death) segueing into an energetic pop-punk song. The song's lyrics criticize those who indulge in hippie culture (referring to "blow wave hairstyles" and "Glastonbury hippies") instead of advocating for political revolution.

== Release ==
Chiswick reissued the single on their budget Big Beat imprint in February 1982. The single was also issued in Australia, Germany, the Netherlands and Spain.

"Smash It Up" was boycotted by BBC Radio 1 because of its perceived anarchic lyrics, stalling at No. 35 in the UK Singles Chart.

In November 2004, Ace Records reissued the single on CD, with alternate versions of the song (including the previously unreleased third and fourth parts of "Smash It Up") and a video, directed by Martin Baker, added.

== Promotion ==
The Damned performed "Smash It Up" (as well as "I Just Can't Be Happy Today") on the BBC2 television show The Old Grey Whistle Test in 1979.

== Track listing ==
All songs written by Scabies, Sensible, Vanian, Ward.

1979 vinyl release

1. "Smash It Up" – 2:52
2. "Burglar" – 3:33

2004 CD release

1. "Smash It Up" – 2:52
2. "Burglar" – 3:33
3. "Smash It Up Parts 1–4" – 8:43

== Production credits ==
Producers

- Roger Armstrong
- The Damned

Musicians

- Dave Vanian − vocals
- Captain Sensible − guitar, keyboards
- Rat Scabies − drums, vocals on "Burglar"
- Algy Ward − bass

== Cover versions ==
"Smash It Up"

Single by The Offspring

from the album Batman Forever soundtrack
- Released: 1995
- Genre: Punk rock
- Length: 3:24
- Label: Epitaph
- Songwriters: Dave Vanian, Captain Sensible, Rat Scabies, Algy Ward

The Offspring singles chronology
| "Gotta Get Away" (1995) | "Smash It Up" (1995) | "All I Want" (1997) |

The song was covered by Die Toten Hosen for the 1991 cover album Learning English, Lesson One.

In 1995, The Offspring covered the song for the soundtrack to the film Batman Forever. Although the song appeared in the film for only a few seconds, the full version was included on the soundtrack. It peaked at No. 16 on the U.S. Modern Rock Tracks chart and No. 47 on the Hot 100 Airplay chart. Its chart success came about since it was the band's first new single after the breakthrough of their Smash album, albeit before their follow-up album Ixnay on the Hombre. It was later released on The Offspring's Club Me EP and also on the "All I Want" CD single.
