= Jon Kelly =

British audio engineer

Jon Kelly is a British audio engineer and record producer, who began his career as an engineer at Air London Studios. He has produced albums and singles for Chris Rea, the Damned, Kate Bush (where he co-produced with Bush on her third album Never for Ever), Pele, The Beautiful South, Prefab Sprout, Deacon Blue, Heather Nova, Rosalie Deighton, the Levellers, Fish, Steve Booker (producer), Lynsey de Paul, Mickey Joe Harte, Nolwenn Leroy and Richard Ashcroft. He also mixed several tracks on Tori Amos's debut album, Little Earthquakes.
