= Roman Jugg =

British musician

Roman Jugg (born 25 July 1957 in Caerphilly, South Wales) is a British keyboard player and guitarist. He began his career in the Welsh punk band Victimize in the late 1970s.

Jugg was an acquaintance of bassist Paul Gray, who was a member of The Damned. In late 1981, Jugg worked with the Damned as a touring keyboardist before becoming a full-time member in 1982 for the album Strawberries. Jugg also worked on a number of Damned-adjacent projects, including Naz Nomad and the Nightmares (under the alias Sphix Svenson_. and David Vanian and the Phantom Chords.

After Captain Sensible left The Damned in 1984, Jugg moved from keyboards to main guitar and became a full member on the studio albums Phantasmagoria (1985) and Anything (1986).

After the 1989 breakup of The Damned he continued to work with Dave Vanian and Bryn Merrick, forming The Phantom Chords. A studio album called David Vanian and the Phantom Chords was released in 1995.

In May 2004, after a nine-year absence, Jugg released a new solo album called Papa Loco. He later assembled the Roman Jugg Band (featuring members such as Dave and Fiona Dulake of The Tuppenny Bunters) to tour and perform live sets spanning his history and songs from The Damned.

== Personal life ==
Jugg lives in the Essex town of Leigh-on-Sea.

Jugg plays accordion in an Irish/folk rock band called Dirty Water which he has described as "a good excuse for getting pissed".

In 2008/2009 Jugg produced and played guitar on the début album of singer-songwriter Andy J Gallagher entitled Helicopter Dolphin Submarine.
