= Bryn Merrick =

Welsh musician

- Born: 12 October 1958; Barry, Glamorgan, Wales
- Died: 12 September 2015 (aged 56) University Hospital Llandough, Penarth, Wales
- Genres: Punk rock; gothic rock
- Occupation: Musician
- Instrument: Bass guitar
- Formerly of: The Damned

Bryn Merrick (12 October 1958 – 12 September 2015) was a bassist who was a member of Cardiff-based punk band Victimize and then heavy-metal band Stormqueen. He later joined the Damned between 1983 and 1989, replacing Paul Gray, who had left for UFO. Merrick's first release with the Damned was the single "Thanks for the Night" b/w "Nasty". He was the Damned's bassist on the albums Phantasmagoria (1985) and Anything (1986).

Merrick played with the Shamones, a Ramones tribute band that toured the UK for five years, until splitting in August 2015.

Merrick died of cancer, at University Hospital Llandough, on 12 September 2015, aged 56.
