= New Model Army discography =

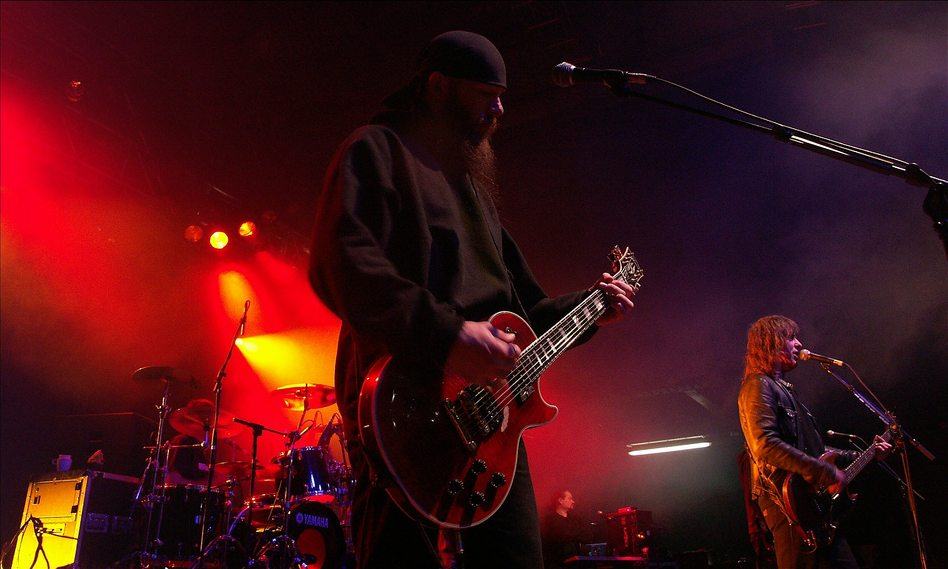
- Studio albums: 16
- Extended plays: 5
- Live albums: 8
- Compilation albums: 10
- Singles: 20
- Video albums: 7

The discography of New Model Army, a British rock band which formed in 1980, consists of fifteen studio albums, four live albums, eleven compilation albums, four extended plays and twenty singles, which were released by Abstract Records, EMI Records, Epic Records and Attack Attack Records, as well as seven video albums.

== Studio albums ==
Year	Title	Peak chart positions	
Year	Title	UK	GER
1984	Vengeance: Released: 4 April 1984; Label: Abstract; Formats: LP, CD	73	—
1985	No Rest for the Wicked: Released: May 1985; Label: EMI; Formats: LP, cassette, CD	22	—
1986	The Ghost of Cain: Released: September 1986; Label: EMI; Formats: LP, cassette, CD	45	—
1989	Thunder and Consolation: Released: 6 February 1989; Label: EMI; Formats: LP, cassette, CD	20	29
1990	Impurity: Released: September 1990; Label: EMI; Formats: LP, cassette, CD	23	16
1993	The Love of Hopeless Causes: Released: 29 March 1993; Label: Epic; Formats: LP, cassette, CD	22	27
1998	Strange Brotherhood: Released: 13 April 1998; Label: Eagle; Formats: Cassette, CD	72	41
2000	Eight: Released: 31 January 2000; Label: Attack Attack; Format: CD	—	38
2005	Carnival: Released: 5 September 2005; Label: Attack Attack; Format: CD	—	48
2007	High: Released: 24 August 2007; Label: Attack Attack; Format: CD	—	53
2009	Today Is a Good Day: Released: 14 September 2009; Label: Attack Attack; Formats: CD, LP	—	59
2013	Between Dog and Wolf: Released: 30 September 2013; Label: Attack Attack; Formats: CD, LP	34	31
2014	Between Wine and Blood: Released: 5 September 2014; Label: Attack Attack; Formats: CD, LP	45	46
2016	Winter: Released: 26 August 2016; Label: Attack Attack; Formats: CD, LP	25	20
2019	From Here: Released: 23 August 2019; Label: Attack Attack; Format: CD	13	6
2024	Unbroken: Released: 26 January 2024; Label: Attack Attack; Format: CD	31	5
"—" denotes releases that did not chart

== Live albums ==
Year	Title	Peak chart positions	
Year	Title	UK	GER
1991	Raw Melody Men: Released: 1991; Label: EMI; Formats: 2×LP, CD	43	22
1994	BBC Radio One Live in Concert: Released: 1994; Label: Windsong International; Formats: LP, CD	—	—
1999	...& Nobody Else: Released: 1999; Label: Attack Attack; Formats: 2×CD	—	—
2008	Fuck Texas, Sing for Us: Released: November 2008; Label: Attack Attack; Formats: CD, music download	—	—
2011	30th Anniversary Concerts: Released: March 2011; Label: Nyquest; Formats: 4xCD, 2xDVD	—	—
2015	Between Wine and Blood Live: Released: April 2015; Label: Attack Attack; Formats: 3xCD, 1xDVD	—	—
2023	Sinfonia: Released: 2023; Label: EARMusic; Formats: 2×LP, 2xCD, DVD	—	6
2025	Live SO36: Released: March 2025; Label: Formats: 2×LP, 2xCD + DVD	—	14
"—" denotes releases that did not chart

== Compilation albums ==
Year	Title
1988	Radio Sessions '83–'84: Released: 1988; Label: Abstract; Formats: LP, CD
1992	History: The Singles 85–91: Released: 1992; Label: EMI; Formats: 2×LP, CD
1994	B-Sides and Abandoned Tracks: Released: 1994; Label: EMI; Format: CD
1997	Small Town England: Released: 1997; Label: Abstract; Format: 2×CD
1999	All of This – The "Live" Rarities: Released: 1999; Label: EMI; Format: CD
2000	New Model Army 3 x CD: Released: 2000; Label: EMI; Format: 3×CD
2002	Lost Songs: Released: 2002; Label: Attack Attack; Format: 2×CD
2003	Great Expectations – The Singles Collection: Released: 2003; Label: Superfecta; Format: CD
2004	The Collection: Released: 2004; Label: EMI; Format: CD
2004	Original 20: Released: 2004; Label: Alter Ego; Format: CD
2010	Anthology: Released: 2010; Label: Attack Attack; Format: 2xCD, 2xCD & 3xDVD

== Extended plays ==
Year	Title	Peak chart positions
Year	Title	UK
1984	The Price: Released: 1984; Label: Abstract Records; Format: 7", 12"	—
1985	Better Than Them (aka The Acoustic EP): Released: 1985; Label: EMI; Format: 7"	49
1987	White Coats: Released: 1987; Label: EMI; Formats: 7", 12"	50
1993	Living in the Rose (aka The Ballads EP): Released: 1993; Label: Epic; Format: CD	51
2006	BD3 EP: Released: 2006; Label: Attack Attack; Format: CD	—
"—" denotes releases that did not chart

== Other album appearances ==
Year	Track	Album	Notes
1985	"Small Town England"	Never Mind the Jacksons, Here's the Pollocks...	Recorded for the John Peel radio show
1999	"Wonderful Way to Go"	Elegy – Numéro 6	Recorded live in Paris on 16 May 1998

== Singles ==
Year	Single	Peak chart positions		Album
Year	Single	UK	SWE	Album
1983	"Bittersweet"	—	—	Non-album single
1983	"Great Expectations"	—	—	Non-album single
1984	"The Price"	98	—	Non-album single
1985	"No Rest" / "Heroin"	28	—	No Rest for the Wicked
1985	"Brave New World"	57	—	Non-album single
1986	"51st State"	71	—	The Ghost of Cain
1987	"Poison Street"	64	—	The Ghost of Cain
1989	"Stupid Questions"	31	—	Thunder and Consolation
1989	"Vagabonds"	37	—	Thunder and Consolation
1989	"Green and Grey"	37	—	Thunder and Consolation
1990	"Get Me Out"	34	—	Impurity
1990	"Purity"	61	—	Impurity
1991	"Space" (live)	39	—	Raw Melody Men
1993	"Here Comes the War"	25	33	The Love of Hopeless Causes
1994	"Vengeance 1994"	—	—	Non-album single
1998	"Wonderful Way to Go"	—	—	Strange Brotherhood
1998	"Queen of My Heart"	—	—	Strange Brotherhood
2005	"Island"	—	—	Carnival
2006	"BD3"	—	—	Carnival
2007	"Wired"	—	—	High
"—" denotes releases that did not chart

== Video albums ==
Year	Title
1985	Live 21.4.85: Released: 1985; Label: EMI; Format: VHS
1989	Videos '86–'89: Released: 1989; Label: EMI; Format: VHS
1992	History: The Videos 85–90: Released: March 1992; Label: EMI; Format: VHS
1993	Here Comes the War: Released: 1993; Labels: Epic, Attack Attack; Format: VHS
1997	Bizarre 1996: Released: 1997; Label: Attack Attack; Format: VHS
2001	Rock City 23 October 2000: Released: 2001; Label: Wooltown; Format: VHS
2004	Live 161203: Released: 17 May 2004; Labels: Secret, MVD, Electric Music Station; Format: DVD (+CD)
2011	30th Anniversary Concerts: Released: 2011; Label: Nyquest; Format: 2DVD (+4CD)
2013	We Love the World: Released: 2013; Label: Secret Records; Format: DVD+CD; Re-issue of Live 161203
