= Sinfonia (New Model Army album) =

Live album by New Model Army
- Released: 15 September 2023
- Recorded: July 2022
- Venue: Tempodrom, Berlin, Germany
- Genre: Punk rock; post-punk; folk rock
- Length: 162:34
- Label: earMUSIC

New Model Army chronology
From Here (2019)	Sinfonia (2023)	Unbroken (2024)

Sinfonia is a live double concert album and DVD video by English rock band New Model Army, released by earMUSIC on 15 September 2023. The album was recorded with the Sinfonia Leipzig Orchestra at the Tempodrom venue in Berlin on 15 July 2022.

== Track listing ==
All music is composed by New Model Army.

Sinfonia track listing
No.	Title	Original version appears on	Length
1.	"Overture"	n/a	4:16
2.	"Devil's Bargain"	Between Wine and Blood	7:19
3.	"Devil"	Winter	5:13
4.	"Innocence"	Impurity	5:53
5.	"Winter"	Winter	5:30
6.	"March in September"	Between Dog and Wolf	4:42
7.	"1984"	Vengeance - the Independent Story	4:26
8.	"Orange Tree Roads"	Eight	4:59
9.	"Marry the Sea"	B-Sides and Abandoned Tracks	4:36
10.	"Ocean Rising"	Navigating by the Stars	5:55
11.	"Ballad"	The Ghost of Cain	5:13
12.	"Passing Through"	From Here	6:50
13.	"Guessing"	Between Wine and Blood	3:45
14.	"Too Close to the Sun"	Carnival	5:49
15.	"Lullaby"	Strange Brotherhood	5:48
16.	"Did You Make it Safe?"	Between Dog and Wolf	4:02
17.	"Shot 18"	No Rest for the Wicked	4:10
18.	"Purity"	Impurity	8:44
19.	"Vagabonds"	Thunder and Consolation	9:56
20.	"Green and Grey"	Thunder and Consolation	7:26
21.	"Wonderful Way to Go"	Strange Brotherhood	8:02

== Personnel ==
New Model Army

- Justin Sullivan – vocals, guitar
- Dean White – guitars, keyboards, vocals
- Ceri Monger – bass, vocals
- Michael Dean – drums, vocals

Other musicians

- Shir-ran Yinon – lead violin, orchestral arrangement
- Cornelius During – conductor
- The Leipzig Sinfonia

Production

- Florian Meyer – recording
- Eike Freese – mixing
- Thorsten Wyk – mastering

== Charts ==
Chart performance for Sinfonia
Chart (2023)	Peak position
Belgian Albums (Ultratop Flanders)	143
German Albums (Offizielle Top 100)	6
UK Album Downloads (OCC)	45

== Release history ==
Release formats for Sinfonia
Country	Date	Label	Format	Catalogue #
Various	15 September 2023	earMUSIC	3×LP + DVD, 2×CD + DVD	0218391EMU
