= History: The Singles 85–91 =

Compilation album by New Model Army
- Released: 1992
- Genre: Rock; post-punk; folk rock
- Length: 53:49
- Label: EMI
- Producer: Mark Freegard; Glyn Johns; Justin Sullivan; Robert Heaton; Tom Dowd

New Model Army chronology
Raw Melody Men (1991)	History: The Singles 85–91 (1992)	The Love of Hopeless Causes (1993)

Alternative Cover
- 2001 reissue cover

Professional ratings
Review scores
Source	Rating
AllMusic	link

History: The Singles 85–91 is a compilation album by the English rock band New Model Army, released in 1992 by EMI Records.

The band later described the release as "a 'cashing in on the catalogue' exercise by EMI", and referred to the playlist as "an unremarkable collection of singles made 'desirable' by the inclusion of "Far Better Thing" and "Higher Wall"", "tacked on the end to make you buy all the songs you already had all over again". The liner notes to the album Lost Songs (2001) indicate that "Far Better Thing" and probably "Higher Wall" were released without the band's consent.

Great Expectations – The Singles Collection was released in 2003 with the band's permission, and covers all stages of the band's career. Most tracks on the History: The Singles 85–91 are single versions, and in some cases differ from the album versions.

In 2001 EMI repackaged and reissued the album as History - The Best of New Model Army.

== Track listing ==
1. "No Rest" (Justin Sullivan, Stuart Morrow, Robert Heaton) – 3:52
2. "Better Than Them" (Sullivan, Heaton) – 3:11
3. "Brave New World" (Sullivan, Heaton, Jason Harris, Joolz Denby) – 3:26
4. "51st State" (Ashley Cartwright, New Model Army) – 2:36
5. "Poison Street" (Sullivan, Heaton) – 3:04
6. "White Coats" (Sullivan, Heaton, Harris) – 4:18
7. "Stupid Questions" (Sullivan, Heaton) – 3:30
8. "Vagabonds" (Sullivan) – 4:21
9. "Green and Grey" (Heaton, Sullivan) – 4:56
10. "Get Me Out" (Sullivan, Heaton) – 3:19
11. "Purity" (Sullivan) – 3:55
12. "Space" (live) (Sullivan, Heaton, Nelson) – 3:42
13. "Far Better Thing" (Sullivan) – 5:17
14. "Higher Wall" (Sullivan, Harris) – 4:22

The album versions of "No Rest" and "Better Than Them" appear on No Rest for the Wicked (1985). "Brave New World" was released on the Brave New World EP (1985). "51st State" and "Poison Street" appear on the album The Ghost of Cain (1986). "White Coats" appears on the White Coats EP (1987). "Stupid Questions", "Vagabonds" and "Green and Grey" appear on Thunder and Consolation (1989). "Get Me Out", "Purity" and "Space" appear on Impurity (1990).

== Personnel ==
Musicians

- Justin Sullivan – vocals, guitar
- Stuart Morrow – bass ("No Rest", "Better Than Them")
- Jason Harris – bass ("Brave New World", "51st State", "Poison Street", "White Coats", "Stupid Questions", "Vagabonds", "Green and Grey", "Higher Wall")
- Nelson – bass ("Get Me Out", "Purity", "Space" (live), "Far Better Thing")
- Robert Heaton – drums

Production

- Mark Freegard – producer ("No Rest", "Better Than Them")
- Glyn Johns – producer ("51st State", "Poison Street")
- Justin Sullivan – producer ("White Coats")
- Robert Heaton – producer ("White Coats")
- Tom Dowd – producer ("Stupid Questions", "Green and Grey", "Higher Wall")
- Andy Wallace – mixing ("Poison Street")
- Nick Davis – mixing ("White Coats")
- John Cornfield – mixing ("Space" (live))
- John Kelly – mixing ("Stupid Questions", "Vagabonds", "Green and Grey")
