= ...& Nobody Else =

... & Nobody Else

Live album by New Model Army
- Released: 1999
- Recorded: 1998
- Genre: Rock, post-punk, folk rock
- Length: 111:58
- Label: Attack, Attack

New Model Army chronology
All of This – The "Live" Rarities (1999)	... & Nobody Else (1999)	Eight (2000)

Professional ratings
Review scores
Source	Rating
Allmusic	4/5 stars

... & Nobody Else was released in 1999 and is a live album released by British rock band New Model Army.

The tracks on this album were recorded at a variety of venues during the Strange Brotherhood tour of 1998.

== Track listing ==
Source: Official site, Allmusic, Discogs

All tracks written by Justin Sullivan and Robert Heaton except where noted.

=== Disc one ===
No.	Title	Length
1.	"Brave New World II" (Sullivan, Heaton, Jason Harris, Joolz Denby)	3:46
2.	"Snelsmore Wood"	3:49
3.	"Eleven Years"	4:12
4.	"Rainy Night 65"	4:53
5.	"Big Blue"	4:20
6.	"Queen of My Heart"	4:22
7.	"Prison" (Sullivan)	4:31
8.	"No Sense"	3:27
9.	"Fate" (Sullivan)	3:06
10.	"The Hunt"	5:18

=== Disc two ===
No.	Title	Length
1.	"Whitelight"	4:45
2.	"Over the Wire"	3:10
3.	"Long Goodbye" (Sullivan)	2:51
4.	"Aimless Desire"	4:57
5.	"Wonderful Way to Go"	5:52
6.	"Inheritance"	4:14
7.	"Lust for Power" (Sullivan)	3:59
8.	"Headlights" (Sullivan, Heaton, Nelson)	5:01
9.	"51st State" (Ashley Cartwright, New Model Army)	2:51
10.	"Get Me Out"	3:34
11.	"No Pain" (Sullivan)	5:36
12.	"Stupid Questions" (Sullivan)	3:33
13.	"Here Comes the War" (Sullivan, Heaton, Nelson)	5:44
14.	"Living in the Rose"	3:50
15.	"Modern Times" (Sullivan, Nelson)	4:04
16.	"Vengeance" (Sullivan)	5:13

== Personnel ==
- Justin Sullivan – vocals, guitar
- Nelson – bass, guitar, drums
- Michael Dean – drums, percussion
- Dave Blomberg – guitar, bass
- Dean White – keyboards
