= BBC Radio One Live in Concert (New Model Army album) =

Live album by New Model Army
- Released: 1993
- Recorded: Berlin Eissporthalle, 1990
- Genre: Rock, post-punk, folk rock
- Length: 60:32
- Label: Windsong International

New Model Army chronology
The Love of Hopeless Causes (1993)	BBC Radio One Live in Concert (1993)	B-Sides and Abandoned Tracks (1994)

Professional ratings
Review scores
Source	Rating
Allmusic	3/5 stars

BBC Radio One Live in Concert is a live album released in 1993 by British rock band New Model Army. It was taken from the Live In Concert show broadcast on BBC Radio 1, and was recorded live at the Berlin Eissporthalle on 5 November 1990.

== Track listing ==
1. "Ambition"
2. "The Charge"
3. "Purity"
4. "Innocence"
5. "Love Songs"
6. "Lurhstaap"
7. "Green and Grey"
8. "Stupid Questions"
9. "Smalltown England"
10. "Archway Towers"
11. "51st State"
12. "I Love the World"
13. "White Coats"

== Personnel ==
- Justin Sullivan – vocals, guitar
- Robert Heaton – drums
- Nelson – bass
- Adrian Portas – keyboards
- Ed Alleyne-Johnson – violin
