= All of This – The "Live" Rarities =

Live album by New Model Army
- Released: 1999
- Recorded: 1985–1990
- Genre: Rock, post-punk, folk rock
- Label: EMI

New Model Army chronology
| Strange Brotherhood (1998) | All of This – The "Live" Rarities (1999) | ...& Nobody Else (1999) |

Professional ratings
Review scores
| Source | Rating |
|---|---|
| AllMusic | 2.5/5 stars |
| Q | 2/5 stars |

All of This – The "Live" Rarities is a live compilation album by the English rock band New Model Army released in 1999 by EMI Records. According to the album's cover these tracks are a compilation of New Model Army's finest and rarest live b-sides and extra tracks.

== Track listing ==
1. "Vengeance" (Justin Sullivan) – 4:42
  - recorded live at the Brixton Academy on 16 June 1990
2. "Young Gifted and Skint" (Sullivan, Stuart Morrow) – 4:41
  - recorded in Lyon, France, on 9 October 1985
3. "A Liberal Education" (Sullivan, Morrow) – 6:26
  - originally available on the bonus 12" with "51st State"
4. "No Rest" (Sullivan, Morrow, Robert Heaton) – 6:14
  - originally available on the bonus 12" with "51st State"
5. "No Man's Land" (Sullivan) – 4:00
  - originally available on the bonus 12" with "51st State"
6. "My Country" (Sullivan, Morrow) – 3:48
  - recorded live at Coventry Polytechnic in October 1986
7. "All of This" (Sullivan, Heaton) – 3:42
  - recorded live at The Ritz, New York City on 5 December 1986
8. "Waiting" (Sullivan) – 4:11
  - recorded live at Rock City, Nottingham on 20 April 1987 on the Manor Mobile by Steve Riddel
9. "51st State" (Ashley Cartwright, New Model Army) – 2:29
  - recorded live at Rock City, Nottingham on 20 April 1987 on the Manor Mobile by Steve Riddel
10. "The Hunt" (Sullivan, Heaton) – 4:43
  - recorded live at Rock City, Nottingham on 20 April 1987 on the Manor Mobile by Steve Riddel
11. "125 MPH" (Sullivan, Heaton, Jason Harris) – 3:55
  - recorded live at The Town & Country Club, London on 21 February 1989 by William Shapland
12. "225" (Sullivan, Heaton) – 4:04
  - recorded live on the "Impurity 90" tour of Europe
13. "Ambition" (Sullivan) – 3:39
  - recorded live on the "Impurity 90" tour of Europe
14. "Betcha" (Sullivan, Morrow, Tompkins) – 3:44
  - recorded live at the Bonn Biskuithalle on 25 October 1988
