= The Collection (New Model Army album) =

Compilation album by New Model Army
- Released: 2004
- Genre: Rock, post-punk, folk rock
- Length: 61:19
- Label: EMI

New Model Army chronology
Great Expectations – The Singles Collection (2003)	The Collection (2004)	Carnival (2005)

The Collection is a compilation album by the British rock band New Model Army. It was released in 2004 by EMI Records.

== Track listing ==
1. "Stupid Questions" (Justin Sullivan) – 3:27
2. "225" (Sullivan, Robert Heaton) – 4:47
3. "Eleven Years" (Sullivan, Heaton) – 3:51
4. "Courage" (Sullivan, Heaton) – 3:16
5. "Space" (Sullivan, Heaton, Nelson) – 3:24
6. "Heroes" (Sullivan) – 4:04
7. "51st State" (Ashley Cartwright, New Model Army) – 2:33
8. "Vanity" (Sullivan) – 5:30
9. "No Rest" (Sullivan, Stuart Morrow, Heaton) – 5:20
10. "Ballad of Bodmin Pill" (Sullivan, Heaton) – 4:47
11. "Deadeye" (Sullivan) – 4:51
12. "Smalltown England" (live) (Sullivan) – 4:11
13. "Drag it Down" (Sullivan, Morrow, Heaton) – 3:25
14. "The Charge" (Sullivan, Heaton) – 2:24
15. "I Love the World" (live) (Sullivan, Heaton) – 5:29
