= Symphony (disambiguation) =

A symphony is an extended piece of music for orchestra, especially one in sonata form.

Symphony, symphonies or symphonic may also refer to:

== Music ==
- Symphony orchestra, an orchestra, which specializes in the performance of post-17th-century orchestral repertoire
- Symphony song, genre in the age of Purcell
- Symphonia, a name applied to several kinds of musical instruments in ancient times
- Symphonic metal, a genre of metal that incorporates its style from symphonies
- Symphony (El Khoury), a 1985 symphony by Bechara El Khoury
- Symphonies (Sallinen), compositions by Aulis Sallinen
- Symphonic Distribution, a digital music distribution company

=== Bands ===
- Symphony X, an American progressive metal band

=== Albums ===
- Symphony (album), a 2008 album by Sarah Brightman
- Symphonic (Falco album), a live performance recorded in 1994 and released in 2008
- Symphonic (Jorn album), released in 2013
- Symphonies (EP), a 2011 remix EP by In Fear and Faith
- Symphonies, a 2016 studio album by Neurotech

=== Songs ===
- "Symphony" (1945 song), a 1945 song made popular by numerous artists
- "Symphony" (Clean Bandit song), a 2017 song by Clean Bandit and Zara Larsson
- "Symphony", a 1992 song by Donell Rush
- "Symphony", a 1999 song by EPMD from the album Out of Business
- "Symphony" (Sarah Brightman song), on the same-named album from 2008
- "Symphony", a 2011 Christian song by Chris Tomlin from the album Passion: Here for You
- "Symphony" (Imagine Dragons song), a 2022 song by Imagine Dragons from the album Mercury – Acts 1 & 2
- "Symphony", a 2022 song by Maggie Rogers from the album Surrender
- "Symphonie", a 2004 song by Silbermond from the album Verschwende Deine Zeit
- "Symphonies" (song), a 2009 song by Dan Black from the album UN
- "The Symphony" (song), a song by Marley Marl from the 1988 album In Control, Volume 1

== Computer science ==
- Symphony Communication, a communication software used by financial firms
- Symphony (software), a distributed computing software
- IBM Lotus Symphony, an office suite for Windows, Macintosh and Linux
- Lotus Symphony (DOS), an office suite for DOS from the 1980s
- Symphony, codename for Windows XP Media Center Edition 2005
- COIN-OR SYMPHONY, a software library for solving a specific class of operations research problems
- Symfony, a web application framework written in PHP
- Symphony Laboratories, a defunct chipset designer
- Symphony CMS, an XSLT-powered open source web content management system written in PHP

== Radio, film and games ==
- Symphony 92.4FM, a Singaporean radio channel
- Symphony (video game), a 2012 music-based shoot-em-up video game
- Symphony (film), a 2004 Malayalam-language Indian feature film directed by I. V. Sasi

== Technology and brands ==
- Symphony (MBTA station), an underground subway stop in Boston, Massachusetts
- Symphony Aircraft Industries, a light aircraft manufacturer
- Symphony Technology Group, a private company based in Palo Alto, California
- Symphonic, a defunct electronics brand formerly manufactured by Funai
- Symphony, a turbofan engine under development by Boom Supersonic

== Other ==
- Symphony (grape), a type of grape used to make white wine
- Symphony, the ring name of professional wrestling valet Alicia Webb
- Symphony (Agendia), a suite of gene assays
- Symphony, the magazine of the League of American Orchestras
- Symphony (candy), a chocolate candy bar manufactured by Hershey's
- Symphony of the Seas, a 2018 cruise ship

== See also ==
- Symphonia (disambiguation)
- Symphonie, communications satellites from a Franco-German program
- Symphogear, a 2012 musical action anime series
