= Raw Melody Men =

Live album by New Model Army
- Released: 1991
- Recorded: Brixton Academy, London Town & Country Club, Berlin Eissporthalle, Hamburg Sporthalle
- Genres: Rock, post-punk, folk rock
- Label: EMI
- Producers: John Cornfield, New Model Army

New Model Army chronology
| Impurity (1990) | Raw Melody Men (1991) | History: The Singles 85–91 (1992) |

Professional ratings
Review scores
| Source | Rating |
|---|---|
| Allmusic | link |

Raw Melody Men was released in 1991 and is the first official live album release by British rock band New Model Army.

The album was recorded during the 1990 Impurity tour at the Brixton Academy, The Town & Country Club in London, the Berlin Eissporthalle and the Hamburg Sporthalle. The album was mixed at the Sawmills Studio in Cornwall.

The title of the track "A Liberal Education" has been abbreviated as "Lib Ed".

The title of the album, Raw Melody Men, is an anagram of "New Model Army". NMA did a short tour playing in small clubs "incognito" under this name prior to the big tour during which the live album was recorded.

== Track listing ==
1. "Whirlwind" (Justin Sullivan, Robert Heaton)
2. "The Charge" (Sullivan, Heaton)
3. "Space" (Sullivan, Heaton, Nelson)
4. "Purity" (Sullivan)
5. "White Coats" (Sullivan, Heaton, Jason Harris)
6. "Vagabonds" (Sullivan)
7. "Get Me Out" (Sullivan, Heaton)
8. "Lib Ed" (Sullivan, Stuart Morrow)
9. "Better Than Them" (Sullivan)
10. "Innocence" (Sullivan, Heaton)
11. "Love Songs" (Sullivan, Heaton)
12. "Lurhstaap" (Sullivan, Heaton)
13. "Archway Towers" (Sullivan, Heaton)
14. "Smalltown England" (Sullivan, Morrow)
15. "Green and Grey" (Sullivan, Heaton)
16. "I Love the World" (Sullivan, Heaton)

== Personnel ==
=== Production ===
- John Cornfield – producer, mixed by
- New Model Army – producer, mixed by

=== Musicians ===
- Justin Sullivan – vocals, guitar
- Robert Heaton – drums, vocals
- Nelson – bass, keyboards, vocals
- Ed Alleyne-Johnson – violin, keyboards, mandolin
- Adrian Portas – guitar
