= B-Sides and Abandoned Tracks =

Compilation album by New Model Army (band)
- Released: 1994
- Genre: Rock, post-punk, folk rock
- Length: 72:49
- Label: EMI

New Model Army (band) chronology
BBC Radio One Live in Concert (1994)	B-Sides and Abandoned Tracks (1994)	Strange Brotherhood (1998)

Professional ratings
Review scores
Source	Rating
Allmusic	4.5/5 stars

B-Sides and Abandoned Tracks was released in 1994 and is a compilation album of British rock band New Model Army of tracks which were previously only available on other singles and EPs.

== Track listing ==
1. "Heroin" (12" Mix) (Justin Sullivan, Joolz Denby) – 5:27
2. "Adrenalin" (Sullivan) – 3:47
3. "No Sense" (Sullivan, Robert Heaton) – 2:45
4. "Trust" (Sullivan) – 2:30
5. "Brave New World" (12" Gregovich Mix) (Sullivan, Heaton, Jason Harris, Denby) – 5:16
6. "R.I.P." (Sullivan, Heaton) – 4:12
7. "Brave New World 2" (Sullivan, Heaton, Harris, Denby) – 3:24
8. "Ten Commandments" (Sullivan) – 3:44
9. "Courage" (Sullivan, Heaton) – 3:18
10. "Lights Go Out" (US Remix) – 6:31
11. "Deadeye" (Sullivan) – 4:53
12. "Prison" (Sullivan) – 4:13
13. "Curse" (Sullivan, Heaton) – 3:56
14. "Ghost of Your Father" – 3:25
15. "Modern Times" (Sullivan, Nelson) – 3:40
16. "Drummy B" (Billy McCann Version) (Sullivan, Heaton) – 4:03
17. "Marry the Sea" (Sullivan) – 4:47
18. "Sleepwalking" – 2:58

"Heroin" (12" Mix) is the b-side to the single "No Rest" (1985). "Adrenalin", "No Sense" and "Trust" are taken from The Acoustic EP (1985). "Brave New World" (12" Gregovich Mix), "R.I.P." and "Brave New World 2" are taken from the Brave New World EP (1985). "Ten Commandments" is the b-side to the single "51st State" (1986). "Courage" is the b-side to the single "Poison Street" (1987). "Lights Go Out" (US Remix) is taken from the US Poison St EP (1987). "Deadeye" is the b-side to the single "Vagabonds" (1989). "Prison" is the b-side to the single "Get Me Out" (1990). "Curse" is the b-side to the single "Purity" (1990). "Ghost of Your Father" and "Modern Times" are the b-sides to the single "Here Comes the War" (1993). "Drummy B" (Billy McCann Version), "Marry the Sea" and "Sleepwalking" are taken from The Ballads EP (1993).
