= Justin Sullivan =

English musical artist

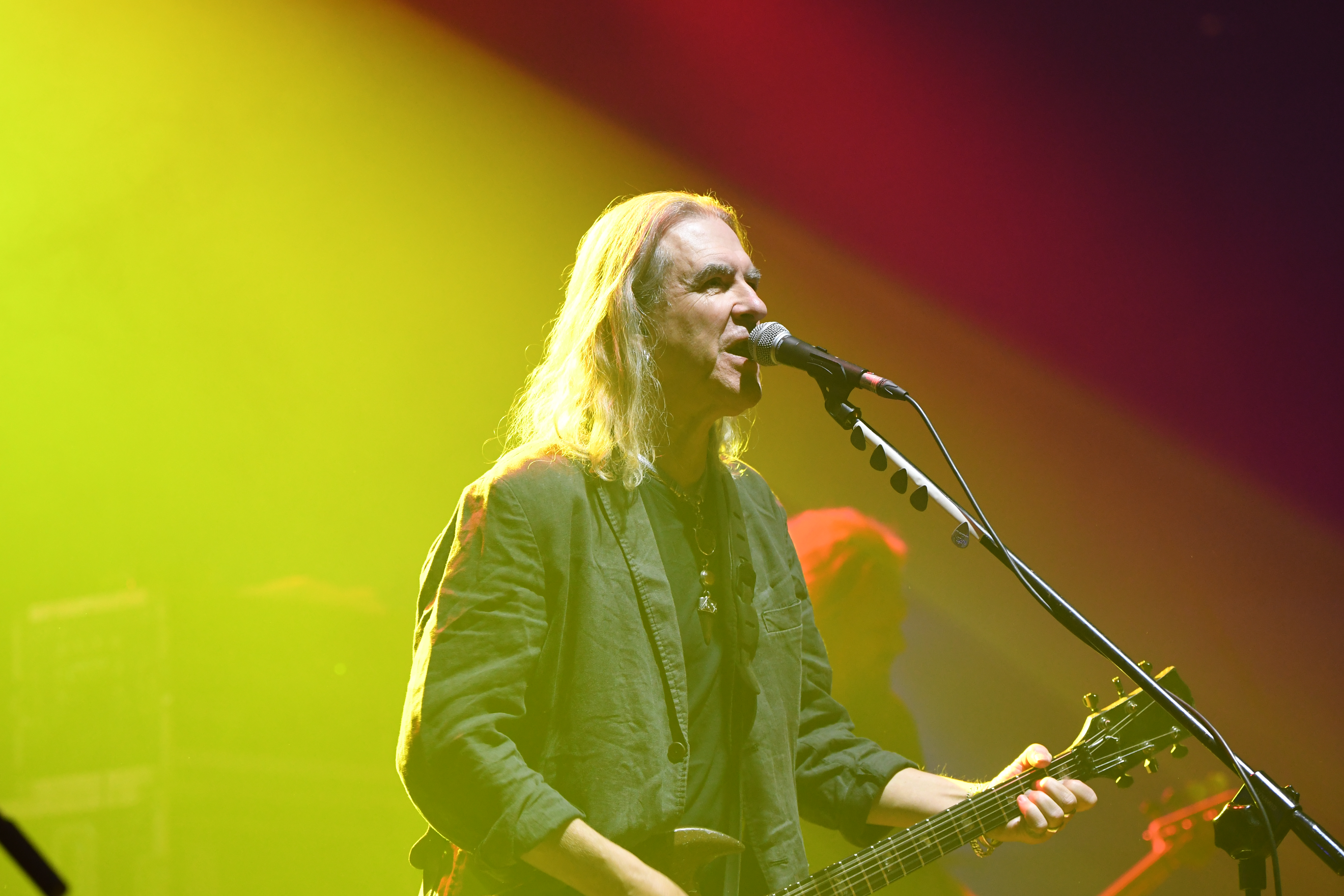
- Sullivan performing in Wrocław, Poland, 2023

Background information
- Also known as: Slade the Leveller
- Born: Justin Edward Sullivan; 8 April 1956 (age 70); Jordans, Buckinghamshire, England
- Origin: Bradford, West Yorkshire, England
- Genres: Punk rock; post-punk; folk rock
- Occupations: Singer-songwriter; musician
- Instruments: Vocals; guitar
- Years active: 1980–present
- Labels: Abstract; EMI; Epic; Eagle; Attack Attack
- Member of: New Model Army
- Formerly of: Red Sky Coven

Justin Edward Sullivan (born 8 April 1956) is an English singer, songwriter and musician. He is also the lead vocalist, guitarist and principal songwriter of English rock band New Model Army, which he formed in 1980 together with drummer Robert Heaton and bassist Stuart Morrow in their hometown of Bradford, West Yorkshire. In the early 1980s he performed under the stage name of "Slade the Leveller", referring to the political movement of the Levellers. His parents are Quaker.

Apart from his regular New Model Army studio albums, he has released two live albums with New Model Army material together with various members of the band capturing their off-duty tours, namely Big Guitars in Little Europe together with Dave Blomberg in 1995 and Tales of the Road together with Dean White and Michael Dean under the name Justin Sullivan & Friends in 2004. He was also a member of Red Sky Coven, which he co-founded, with Rev Hammer, Joolz Denby and Brett Selby. He collaborated with Denby and Heaton on the studio album Hex (1987), which put music to Denby's poetry, and then recorded "Weird Sister" and "Spirit Stories", also putting music to Denby's poetry.

In 2003, Sullivan debuted as a solo artist with the studio album Navigating by the Stars. His songs "Tales of the Road", "White Lights", "Lullaby", "Navigating by the Stars" have been remixed by Christoph H. Mueller (Gotan Project) and added to the pre-release soundtrack of Exilée, a thriller by Nemo Sandman (with Denby), director of Wonderful Way to Go and other videos and stills for NMA. In 2007, Sullivan sang on "Who Has Questions for the Dead?" on the This Is Menace studio album The Scene Is Dead.

== Albums ==
=== Solo ===
- Navigating by the Stars (2003)
- Surrounded (2021)

=== New Model Army ===
Studio albums

- Vengeance (1984)
- No Rest for the Wicked (1985)
- The Ghost of Cain (1986)
- Thunder and Consolation (1989)
- Impurity (1990)
- The Love of Hopeless Causes (1993)
- Strange Brotherhood (1998)
- Eight (2000)
- Carnival (2005)
- High (2007)
- Today Is a Good Day (2009)
- Between Dog and Wolf (2013)
- Between Wine and Blood (2014)
- Winter (2016)
- From Here (2019)
- Unbroken (2024)

Live albums

- Raw Melody Men (1991)
- BBC Radio One Live in Concert (1993)
- ...& Nobody Else (1999)
- Fuck Texas, Sing for Us (2008)

Compilations

- Radio Sessions '83–'84 (1985)
- B-Sides and Abandoned Tracks (1994)
- Small Town England (1997)
- History: The Singles 85–91 (1992)
- All of This – The "Live" Rarities (1999)
- New Model Army 3 x CD (2000)
- The Best (2001)
- Lost Songs (2002)
- Great Expectations – The Singles Collection (2003)
- Original 20 (2004)
- The Collection (2004)
- Anthology (2010)

=== Red Sky Coven ===
- Volumes 1 & 2 (1998)
- Volume 3 (2001)
- Volume 5 (2009)

=== Other album releases ===
- Hex (1987), with Joolz Denby and Robert Heaton under the moniker of Joolz
- Big Guitars in Little Europe (1995), with Dave Blomberg
- Tales of the Road (2004), with Dean White and Michael Dean under the moniker of Justin Sullivan & Friends

=== Other work ===
- Ultra (1994), by the German folk rock band the Inchtabokatables, has Sullivan accredited as the album's producer
- The Scene Is Dead (2007), by British metalcore supergroup This Is Menace, lead vocals on "Who Had Questions for the Dead?"
- The Living Infinite (2013), by Swedish melodic death metal band Soilwork, guest appearance on "The Windswept Mercy"
