= Symphonia (disambiguation) =

The Symphonia is an ancient musical instrument.

Symphonia or Symfonia may also refer to:

- Symphonia (song), a song by Abdeelgha4
- Symphonia (plant), a plant genus of the family Clusiaceae
- Symphonia (moth), a moth genus of the family Crambidae
- Symphonia (theology), a Byzantine theory of church-state relations
- Symphonia (record label), an Italian classical record label
- Tales of Symphonia, a 2003 Japanese role-playing game for the GameCube
- a fictional kingdom in the manga and anime series Rave Master
- Symfonia, a 2010-2011 Finnish metal band

== See also ==
- Sinfonia (disambiguation)
- Symphony (disambiguation)
