= Sinfonia (disambiguation) =

A sinfonia is any of several musical instrumental forms.

Sinfonia may also refer to:

- Sinfónía, a 2004 live album by Icelandic pop/rock band Todmobile with the Icelandic Symphony Orchestra
- Sinfonia (Berio), a 1968–69 composition by the Italian composer Luciano Berio
  - Sinfonia (1968 Berio album), a 1968 recording of Berio conducting the premier of his "Sinfonia"
- ABC Sinfonia, the Australian Broadcasting Corporation's national training orchestra from 1967 to 1986
- Sinfonia (New Model Army album), 2023

== See also ==
- Sinfonia concertante
- Phi Mu Alpha Sinfonia, an American National Music Fraternity
- Symphonia (disambiguation)
