= Nemo Sandman =

French composer, film director and illustrator

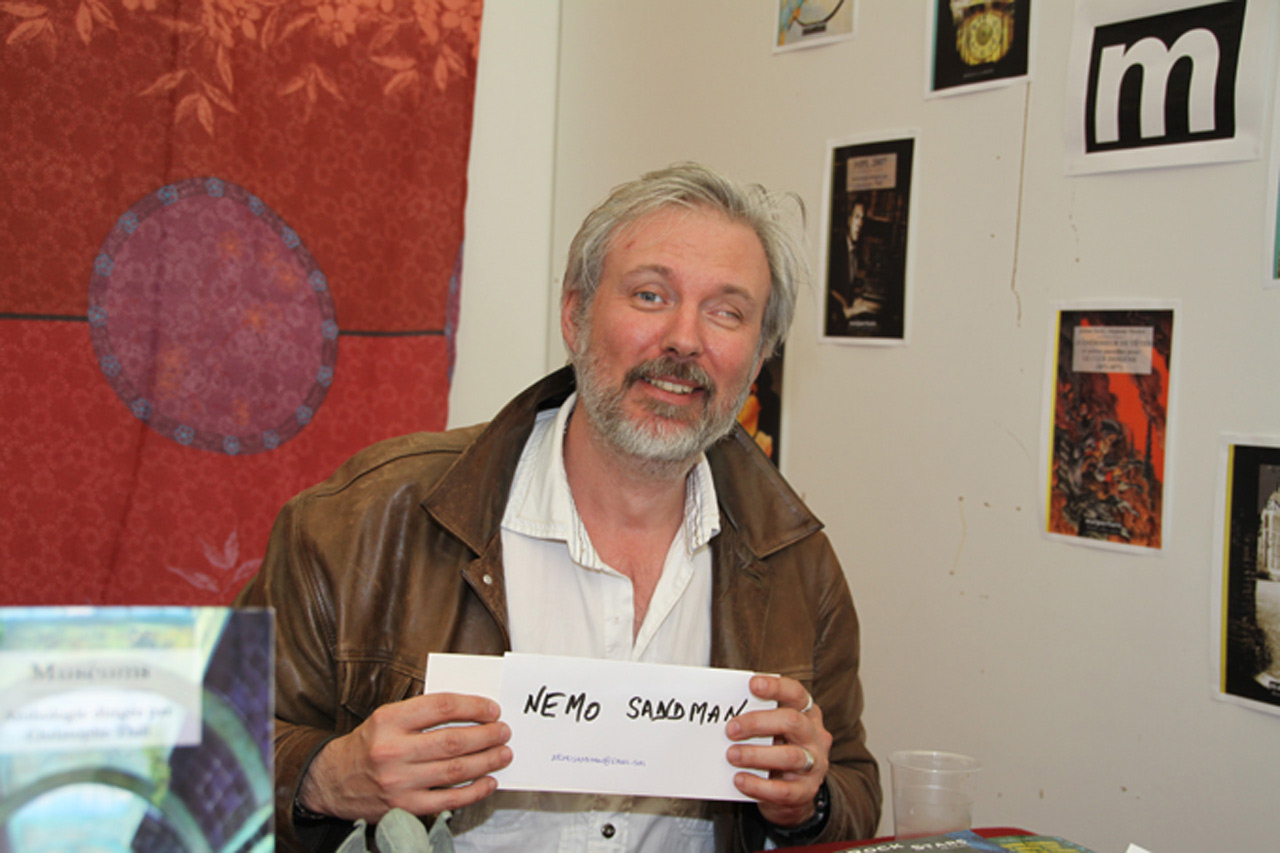
- Born: 22 April 1966; Paris, France
- Years active: 1989–present day

Nemo Sandman is a French composer, film director and illustrator. He is best known for his controversial musical videos on MTV for New Model Army, Lustral, Ten Mother Tongues, M.I.E.L, Gabriela Arnon, End of Orgy, Rise and Fall of a Decade and his arty commercials for Virgin France.

Nemo Sandman also produced and directed international award-winning video, Riding The Rafale featuring the Jet Fighter Rafale made by Dassault with François Robinaud. He pursued his collaboration with Justin Sullivan co-signing the music and Joolz Denby on screenplays.

As a composer, for the German label Black Rain, Nemo Sandman signed the symphonic remixes (track 2 Tchetcheny My Love and track 11 Don't Save The museum - Urban Remix) on the CD Tribute to a Friend from the double album Love it or leave it by the Rise and Fall of Decade. He also produced and directed the musical video of Don't Save The Museum - Urban Remix .

As an illustrator, Nemo Sandman signed the successful French version of Jeffrey Lord's Richard Blade Series since December 2007.
