= Rise and Fall of a Decade =

French band

- Origin: France
- Genres: Electronica, downtempo, ambient, trip hop, dreampop, ethereal wave
- Years active: 1988–2008
- Labels: Lively Art, Single KO, Hyperium, in/scène, Black Rain, Other Voices Records
- Members: Thierry Sintoni; Sandy Casado
- Past members: Pierre-François Maurin-Malet
- Website: http://www.riseandfall.info

Rise and Fall of a Decade is an French band trio founded in 1988 by Thierry Sintoni, Pierre-François Maurin-Malet and Sandy Casado.

Since 1997, their music videos have been directed by Nemo Sandman.

In May 2007 Pierre-François died of cancer. A tribute CD was recorded.

Since March 2016, Sandy and Thierry are forming a new duo called Girls Like You.

== Discography ==
- Love It or Leave It (11/2008), double album including A Tribute to Pierre-François
- Yesterday, Today & Tomorrow (07/2007), best of album
- You or Sidney - Re-Release (05/2007)
- Noisy but empty - Re-Release (05/2007)
- Forget the twentieth century (1997)
- Rise and Fall of a Decade - Re-Release (1995)
- Mistake EP (1995)
- Ubu Reine, live album (1995)
- You or Sidney (1994)
- Noisy but empty (1992)
- An evening with Bernard EP (1991), recording of their Black Session on Radio France. Black Sessions are the French equivalent to John Peel Sessions
- Rise and Fall of a Decade (1990)
