= The Love of Hopeless Causes =

Studio album by New Model Army
- Released: 29 March 1993
- Genre: Rock
- Label: Epic
- Producers: Niko Bolas, Riku Mattila

New Model Army chronology
History - The Singles 85-91 (1992)	The Love of Hopeless Causes (1993)	BBC Radio One Live in Concert (1994)

Professional ratings
Review scores
Source	Rating
AllMusic	4/5 stars

The Love of Hopeless Causes is the sixth studio album by British rock band New Model Army, released in 1993. It was produced by Niko Bolas, except "Afternoon Song", which was produced by Riku Mattila. It featured guest musicians, guitarist Adrian Portas and Clive Layton, who played the Hammond organ on "Fate".

After the break from EMI, The Love of Hopeless Causes was the band's only album to be released on Epic, prior to the formation of the band's own label, Attack Attack Records.

The album saw the band abandoning the folk rock-oriented sound of their previous albums, Thunder and Consolation (1989) and Impurity (1990), going for a more classic straightforward rock sound.

The album reached No. 22 on the UK Albums Chart in April 1993.

== Singles and EPs ==
"Here Comes the War" (February 1993) was the only single released from the album and is their highest charting single in the UK, peaking at No. 25 on the UK singles chart. "Living in the Rose" was the title track of The Ballads EP (July 1993).

== Versions ==
The album was released as a 10-track LP, cassette and CD on 29 March 1993. There are no track differences between the formats.

== Track listing ==
1. "Here Comes the War" (Justin Sullivan, Robert Heaton, Nelson) – 4:29
2. "Fate" (Sullivan) – 3:20
3. "Living in the Rose" (Sullivan, Heaton) – 3:49
4. "White Light" (Sullivan, Heaton) – 4:44
5. "Believe It" (Sullivan, Heaton) – 4:02
6. "Understand U" (Sullivan, Heaton) – 3:33
7. "My People" (Sullivan) – 4:39
8. "These Words" (Sullivan) – 3:36
9. "Afternoon Song" (Sullivan, Heaton) – 2:35
10. "Bad Old World" (Sullivan) – 3:33

== Personnel ==
=== Production ===
- Niko Bolas – producer (all tracks except "Afternoon Song"), recorded by (all tracks except "Afternoon Song")
- Riku Mattila – producer ("Afternoon Song"), recorded by ("Afternoon Song")
- Tim Young – mastered by
- Dave Buchannan – engineer (all tracks except "Afternoon Song")
- Andrea Wright – engineer (all tracks except "Afternoon Song")
- Greg Goldman – assistant engineer
- Randy Wine – assistant engineer
- Fulton Dingles – engineer ("Afternoon Song")
- Bob Clearmountain – mixing
- Dani Griffiths – additional recorded by (all tracks except "Afternoon Song")
- Peter Stewart – additional recorded by (all tracks except "Afternoon Song")
- Joolz Denby – cover art

=== Weekly charts ===
Weekly chart performance for Love Of Hopeless Causes
Chart (1993)	Peak position
German Albums (Offizielle Top 100)	27

=== Musicians ===
- Justin Sullivan – vocals, guitars, keyboards
- Robert Heaton – drums, guitars, backing vocals
- Nelson – bass, guitars, backing vocals
- Adrian Portas – guitar
- Clive Layton – Hammond organ ("Fate")
