= Lost Songs (New Model Army album) =

Compilation album by New Model Army
- Released: 2002
- Genre: Rock, post-punk, folk rock
- Length: 87:17
- Label: Attack Attack Records
- Compiler: Justin Sullivan, Michael Dean

New Model Army chronology
Eight (2000)	Lost Songs (2002)	Great Expectations – The Singles Collection (2003)

Professional ratings
Review scores
Source	Rating
Allmusic	3/5 stars

Lost Songs was released in 2002 and is a compilation album of British rock band New Model Army of bonus, rare and previously unreleased tracks compiled by Justin Sullivan and Michael Dean. The album covers the period from The Love of Hopeless Causes (1993) to this release.

== Track listing ==
=== Disc one ===
1. "Brother" (Justin Sullivan, Robert Heaton, Nelson) – 5:58
2. "Sunset" (Sullivan) – 3:29
3. "Southwest" (Sullivan) – 3:50
4. "Song to the Men of England" (Percy Shelley, Sullivan, Heaton) – 4:48
5. "Refugee" (Sullivan, Heaton) – 4:05
6. "Higher Wall" (Sullivan, Jason Harris) – 4:22
7. "Far Better Thing" (Sullivan) – 5:14
8. "Rainy Night 65" (Sullivan, Heaton) – 4:57
9. "Caslen" (Sullivan, Nice) – 1:33
10. "BD7" (Sullivan) – 3:21
11. "F#NY" (Sullivan, Heaton) – 3:16
12. "See You in Hell" (Sullivan, Heaton) – 5:44

=== Disc two ===
1. "Freedom '91" (Sullivan) – 3:42
2. "Wanting" (Sullivan, Heaton) – 3:39
3. "Still Here" (Sullivan, Heaton) – 3:14
4. "If You Can't Save Me" (Sullivan, Heaton, Nelson) – 3:07
5. "Falling" (Sullivan) – 4:16
6. "Trees in Winter" (Sullivan) – 4:12
7. "Knife" (Sullivan) – 3:32
8. "Burning Season" (Sullivan) – 3:25
9. "Coming Up" (Sullivan, Heaton) – 3:23
10. "Over the Wire" (French Remix) (Sullivan, Heaton) – 4:10
