= Billie Morgan =

2005 novel by Joolz Denby

- Author: Joolz Denby
- Language: English
- Publication date: 2005

Billie Morgan is a 2005 novel by English writer, poet and tattooist Joolz Denby. It was shortlisted for the 2006 Orange Prize for Fiction.

== Plot ==
The central character, Billie, is a 46-year-old woman who runs a new age shop in Bradford, England. However, she keeps a dark secret, that when younger and part of a biker gang, she murdered Terry, an unpleasant drug addict and the father of her godson Natty, and covered it up with the aid of her lover Mickey. The novel takes the form of a confession written by Billie when she fears a journalist will expose her past.

== Critical reaction ==
Most reviewers noted the strong central character and the abundance of depravity, violence and criminality, while differing on its literary merits.

The New York Times praised the central character's verve, which they felt made up for the other less well developed characters.

Linda Herrick in the New Zealand Herald found it overwritten, with so much crammed in, and a tendency for over-the-top melodramatic passages.

Publishers Weekly found it "fascinating" but hard to read, with a "raw power".

Entertainment Weekly scored it B+, noting the extensive catalog of depravity and suggesting it was ripe for turning into a movie.
