= Great Expectations – The Singles Collection =

Great Expectations - The Singles Collection

Compilation album by New Model Army
- Released: 2003
- Genre: Rock, post-punk, folk rock
- Length: 69:55
- Label: Superfecta
- Compiler: Justin Sullivan

New Model Army chronology
Lost Songs (2002)	Great Expectations - The Singles Collection (2003)	The Collection (2004)

Professional ratings
Review scores
Source	Rating
AllMusic	4.5/5 stars
The Encyclopedia of Popular Music	3/5 stars

Great Expectations – The Singles Collection is a compilation album of British rock band New Model Army's singles, released in 2003. The album was released only in the United States.

== Track listing ==
1. "Great Expectations" (Justin Sullivan, Stuart Morrow) – 3:15
2. "The Price" (Sullivan, Morrow) – 3:27
3. "No Rest" (Sullivan, Heaton, Morrow) – 3:52
4. "Better Than Them" (7" version) (Sullivan, Heaton) – 3:10
5. "Brave New World" (Sullivan, Heaton, Jason Harris, Joolz Denby) – 3:26
6. "51st State" (Ashley Cartwright, New Model Army) – 2:34
7. "Poison Street" (extended mix) (Sullivan, Heaton) – 4:05
8. "White Coats" (Sullivan, Heaton, Harris) – 4:17
9. "Stupid Questions" (Sullivan) – 3:29
10. "Vagabonds" (album version) (Sullivan) – 5:23
11. "Green and Grey" (edit) (Sullivan, Heaton) – 4:57
12. "Get Me Out" (Sullivan, Heaton) – 3:19
13. "Purity" (US edit) (Sullivan) – 4:11
14. "Here Comes the War" (Sullivan, Heaton, Nelson) – 4:29
15. "Living in the Rose" (Sullivan, Heaton) – 3:52
16. "Wonderful Way to Go" (single mix) (Sullivan, Heaton) – 4:38
17. "You Weren't There" (Sullivan) – 3:36
18. "Orange Tree Roads" (Sullivan) – 3:55
