= Fuck Texas, Sing for Us =

Live album by New Model Army
- Released: 2008
- Genre: Rock, post-punk, folk rock
- Label: Attack Attack

New Model Army chronology
High (2007)	Fuck Texas, Sing for Us (2008)	Today Is a Good Day (2009)

Fuck Texas, Sing for Us is a live album released by British rock band New Model Army on 17 November 2008.

The tracks on this album were recorded at a variety of venues during the High tour of 2007/2008. The title of the album is taken from an audience chant that preceded the encore in New Orleans at the Hi Ho Lounge.

== Track listing ==
1. "Intro" – 0:24
2. "225" – 4:01
3. "Nothing Dies Easy" – 4:11
4. "Island" – 4:40
5. "Into the Wind" – 4:20
6. "Breathing" – 4:30
7. "Rivers" – 5:01
8. "One of the Chosen" – 4:29
9. "Bloodsports" – 4:24
10. "Lust for Power" – 4:04
11. "No Mirror, No Shadow" – 3:51
12. "High" – 4:40
13. "Family" – 4:22
14. "Vagabonds" – 6:09
15. "Wired" – 3:22
16. "Bad Old World" – 4:09
17. "Masterrace" – 3:13
18. "Poison Street" – 3:44

== Personnel ==
- Justin Sullivan – vocals, guitar
- Nelson – bass, vocals
- Dean White – keyboards, vocals
- Michael Dean – drums, vocals
- Marshal Gill – guitar, vocals
