= High (New Model Army album) =

Studio album by New Model Army
- Released: 20 August 2007
- Recorded: State of the Ark, Surrey
- Genre: Rock
- Length: 49:15
- Label: Attack Attack
- Producer: Chris Kimsey

New Model Army chronology
Carnival (2005)	High (2007)	Fuck Texas, Sing for Us (2009)

Professional ratings
Review scores
Source	Rating
AllMusic	4/5 stars

High is the tenth studio album of British rock band New Model Army, released on 20 August 2007 in the United Kingdom, 24 August in Germany and 4 September in North America.

== Track listing ==
All tracks written by Justin Sullivan, Nelson, Michael Dean, Dean White and Marshall Gill.

1. "Wired" – 3:19
2. "One of the Chosen" – 4:34
3. "High" – 4:38
4. "No Mirror, No Shadow" – 3:43
5. "Dawn" – 3:44
6. "All Consuming Fire" – 3:23
7. "Sky in Your Eyes" – 4:13
8. "Into the Wind" – 4:11
9. "Nothing Dies Easy" – 3:57
10. "Breathing" – 4:35
11. "Rivers" – 4:31
12. "Bloodsports" – 4:27

== Personnel ==
=== Musicians ===
- Justin Sullivan – vocals, guitar
- Nelson – bass
- Michael Dean – drums
- Dean White – keyboards
- Marshall Gill – guitars
- Anna Esslemont – violins

=== Production ===
- Chris Kimsey – producer, mixing
- Chris West – engineer
- Frank Cameli – engineer, mixing
- Jon Astley – mastering
- Joolz Denby – illustrations
- Gem Pope – photography
