= Radio Sessions '83–'84 =

Compilation album by New Model Army
- Released: 23 May 1988
- Genre: Rock; post-punk
- Length: 44:40
- Label: Abstract
- Producer: Dale Griffin; Roger Pusey; New Model Army

New Model Army chronology
The Ghost of Cain (1986)	Radio Sessions '83–'84 (1988)	Thunder and Consolation (1989)

Professional ratings
Review scores
Source	Rating
AllMusic	4.5/5 stars

Radio Sessions '83–'84 (1988) is a compilation album by the English rock band, New Model Army.

The tracks on the album are from the band's sessions for BBC Radio. The tracks "Great Expectations", "I Wish", "Notice Me" and "Liberal Education" were first broadcast on the David Jensen show on 17 July 1983. The tracks "Smalltown England", "Spirit of the Falklands", "Christian Militia" and "Running in the Rain" were first broadcast on the John Peel show on 14 December 1983. "The Cause" was an unreleased demo. The tracks "Drag it Down", "Frightened" and "The Attack" were first broadcast on the Janice Long show on 30 December 1984.

The album was first released on LP and CD in June 1988. In 1997 the CD version was packaged together with the album Vengeance (1984) as a limited edition double CD with a picture disc and titled Small Town England. The album was reissued on its own on CD in 2002, and with Vengeance again as part of Vengeance: The Whole Story 1980-84 in 2012.

== Track listing ==
All tracks written by Justin Sullivan and Stuart Morrow except where otherwise noted.

1. "Great Expectations" – 3:04
2. "I Wish" – 3:55
3. "Notice Me" – 2:40
4. "Liberal Education" – 4:51
5. "Smalltown England" – 3:23
6. "Spirit of the Falklands" – 3:54
7. "Christian Militia" – 3:39
8. "Running in the Rain" (Sullivan) – 4:19
9. "The Cause" (Sullivan) – 4:08
10. "Drag it Down" (Sullivan, Robert Heaton, Morrow) – 3:36
11. "Frightened" – 3:47
12. "The Attack" (Sullivan) – 3:24

== Personnel ==
=== Production ===
- Dale Griffin – producer ("Great Expectations", "I Wish", "Notice Me", "Liberal Education")
- Roger Pusey – producer ("Smalltown England", "Spirit of the Falklands", "Christian Militia", "Running in the Rain")
- New Model Army – producer ("The Cause")
- Mike Eagles – engineer ("Great Expectations", "I Wish", "Notice Me", "Liberal Education")
- Harry Parker – engineer ("Smalltown England", "Spirit of the Falklands", "Christian Militia", "Running in the Rain")

=== Musicians ===
- Justin Sullivan – vocals, guitar
- Stuart Morrow – bass, vocals
- Robert Heaton – drums
