= Bechara El Khoury (composer) =

Franco–Lebanese composer

Bechara El Khoury (born 18 March 1957) is a Franco-Lebanese composer.

== Biography ==
Born in Beirut, he moved to Paris in 1979. Before his departure he was extremely active as a composer, pianist, conductor as well as Kapellmeister. He became a French national in 1987, and as a result many French institutions commissioned works for him like Orchestre de Paris, Musique nouvelle en liberté, Radio France, Festival Menuhin in Gstaad, Strasbourg Philharmonic, Mecklenburg Festival etc. His uncle was Bechara Abdullah El Khoury the Lebanese Poet known as Al-Akhtal al-Saghir. He had a Sister Victoria who married Chukri Mikhael Tutunji.

He received the Prix Rossini (Institut de France) in 2000 and his work was performed by many orchestras. as the Orchestre National de France, Orchestre de Paris, London Symphony Orchestra, Czech Philharmonic Orchestra, NDR Symphony Orchestra Hamburg, Orchestre philharmonique du Liban, Oslo Philharmonic Orchestra, Konzerthausorchester Berlin, the Detroit Symphony Orchestra, Strasbourg Philharmonic Orchestra, the National Symphony Orchestra of Ukraine, Israel Chamber Orchestra, Chamber Orchestra of Europe, Basel Chamber Orchestra ...

Among the musicians who conducted his music, Pierre Dervaux (who recorded "Danse des aigles, opus 9" with the Orchestre Colonne), Kurt Masur, Daniele Gatti, Paavo Järvi, Daniel Harding, James Conlon, Cornelius Meister and Jonathan Nott ...

Among the soloists who performed his music Daniel Hope, Emmanuel Pahud, Patrick Messina, Sarah Nemtanu, David Guerrier, Pascal Amoyel...

His works are predominantly orchestral and include concertos.

His works are published by the Editions Durand, Eschig, and Leduc in Paris.

== Major works ==
- Orchestral works, including Symphony (The Ruins of Beirut)
- New York, tears and hope
- Oeuvres symphoniques & oeuvres concertantes by Bechara El-Khoury
- Violin Recital: Siranossian, Chouchane – RUST, F.W. / EL-KHOURY, B. / SIRANOSSIAN, C. / LECLAIR, J.-M. (Time Reflexion)
- EL-KHOURY, B.: Violin Concerto No. 1 / Horn Concerto / Clarinet Concerto (Nemtanu, Guerrier, Messina, Masur, J.-C. Casadesus, Elts)
- Three concertos
- Méditation poétique/Poémes: No. 1; No. 2
- Paris, mélodie d'automne : op. 69, pour piano
- New York dreams : op. 68, pour piano
- Sonate no 3 : Jésus, l'enfant du soleil : op. 67, pour piano.
- Clair-Obscur.
