= Eight (New Model Army album) =

Studio album by New Model Army
- Released: 31 January 2000
- Genre: Rock
- Length: 46:31
- Label: Attack Attack
- Producer: Justin Sullivan, Michael Dean, Dean White

New Model Army chronology
...& Nobody Else (1999)	Eight (2000)	Lost Songs (2002)

Professional ratings
Review scores
Source	Rating
Allmusic	4/5 stars
Kerrang!	3/5 stars

Eight was released in 2000 and is the eighth studio album by British rock band New Model Army. Following the departure of Robert Heaton, Michael Dean and Dean White were recruited into the band, who also co-produced Eight with Justin Sullivan.

== Singles ==
Two tracks were released as singles: "You Weren't There" (November 1999) and "Orange Tree Roads" (2000).

== Track listing ==
All tracks written by Justin Sullivan except where otherwise noted.

1. "Flying Through the Smoke" (Sullivan, Robert Heaton) – 3:13
2. "You Weren't There" – 3:36
3. "Orange Tree Roads" – 3:56
4. "Someone Like Jesus" – 6:36
5. "Stranger – 3:35
6. "R&R" (Sullivan, Michael Dean) – 3:37
7. "Snelsmore Wood" – 4:14
8. "Paekakariki Beach" – 4:43
9. "Leeds Road 3AM" (Sullivan, Dean) – 5:18
10. "Mixam" (Sullivan, Dean) – 3:31
11. "Wipe Out" – 4:12

== Personnel ==
=== Production ===
- Justin Sullivan – producer, recorded by
- Michael Dean – producer, recorded by
- Dean White – producer, recorded by

=== Musicians ===
- Justin Sullivan – vocals, guitar, keyboards, bass, harmonica on "You Weren't There"
- Nelson – bass, percussion
- Michael Dean – drums, percussion, backing vocals
- Dean White – keyboards, guitar, bass
- Dave Blomberg – guitar
- Mark Feltham – harmonica on "Someone Like Jesus" and "Mixam"
- Louise Jones – voice on "Orange Tree Roads"

=== Weekly charts ===
Weekly chart performance for Eight
Chart (2000)	Peak position
German Albums (Offizielle Top 100)	38
