= Between Dog and Wolf =

Studio album by New Model Army
- Released: 30 September 2013
- Genre: Rock
- Length: 46:31
- Label: Attack Attack
- Producer: Justin Sullivan, Joe Barresi

New Model Army chronology
Today Is a Good Day (2009)	Between Dog and Wolf (2013)	Between Wine and Blood (2014)

Between Dog and Wolf is the 12th studio album by British rock band New Model Army, released on 30 September 2013 by Attack Attack Records.

== Background ==
Between Dog and Wolf is the first New Model Army album with new bass player Ceri Monger, replacing Nelson who left after 22 years in the band. The self-produced set was finished in 2013 in Los Angeles and co-produced by Joe Barresi.

It was the first New Model Army to chart in the UK Top 40 Album Chart since The Love of Hopeless Causes in 1993, peaking at No. 34 in October 2013.

== Critical reception ==
Professional ratings
Aggregate scores
Source	Rating
Metacritic	73/100
Review scores
Source	Rating
Record Collector	4/5 stars
Mojo	4/5 stars
Laut magazine	4/5 stars

On the Metacritic website, which aggregates reviews from critics and assigns a normalised rating out of 100, Between Dog and Wolf received a score of 73, based on 12 mixed and 4 positive reviews. Record Collector called it "a record of striking primal force", praising new bass player Monger's "expressive grooves". The review in Mojo describes "a marked directional change away from ragged punk" in the sound of the album, praising new-found "temperance and restraint" and calling Between Dog and Wolf "something of a late-in-the-day career high".

== Track listing ==
All tracks written by New Model Army

1. "Horsemen" – 4:09
2. "March in September" – 4:01
3. "Seven Times" – 3:22
4. "Did You Make It Safe?" – 3:28
5. "I Need More Time" – 4:50
6. "Pull the Sun" – 5:25
7. "Lean Back and Fall" – 3:58
8. "Knievel" – 3:16
9. "Stormclouds" – 3:40
10. "Between Dog and Wolf" – 6:27
11. "Qasr El Nil Bridge " – 6:59
12. "Tomorrow Came" – 4:09
13. "Summer Moors" – 4:20
14. "Ghosts" – 5:29

== Personnel ==
=== New Model Army ===
- Justin Sullivan – vocals, guitar, keyboards, harmonica
- Ceri Monger – bass, percussion, dulcimer, backing vocals
- Michael Dean – drums, percussion, backing vocals
- Dean White – keyboards, guitar, backing vocals, percussion
- Marshall Gill – guitar, percussion, backing vocals

=== Guest musicians ===
- Jade Doherty – layered gospel vocals
- Tobias Unterberg – cello
- Tom Moth – harp
- Charlotte Woods – euphonium, trombone
- Will Blackstone – flugelhorn
- Chris Powell – cornet, flugelhorn

=== Production ===
- Justin Sullivan – producer, recorded by
- Michael Dean – producer, recorded by
- Dean White – producer, recorded by

== Charts ==
Chart performance for Between Dog and Wolf
Chart (2013)	Peak position
German Albums (Offizielle Top 100)	31
Scottish Albums (OCC)	51
UK Albums (OCC)	34
UK Independent Albums (OCC)	7
