= Today Is a Good Day =

Studio album by New Model Army
- Released: September 2009
- Genre: Rock
- Label: Attack Attack
- Producer: Chris Kimsey

New Model Army chronology
Fuck Texas, Sing for Us (2007)	Today Is a Good Day (2009)	Between Dog and Wolf (2013)

Today Is a Good Day is the 11th studio album of British rock band New Model Army, released on 14 September 2009 in the UK and 15 September 2009 in the US.

Professional ratings
Review scores
Source	Rating
AllMusic	4/5 stars

== Track listing ==
All tracks written by Justin Sullivan, Nelson, Michael Dean, Dean White and Marshall Gill.

1. "Today Is a Good Day" – 4:02
2. "Autumn" – 4:03
3. "Peace Is Only" – 3:49
4. "States Radio" – 4:50
5. "God Save Me" – 5:25
6. "Disappeared" – 4:59
7. "Ocean Rising" – 5:12
8. "Mambo Queen of the Sandstone City" – 3:59
9. "La Push" – 4:37
10. "Arm Yourselves and Run" – 3:09
11. "Bad Harvest" – 3:33
12. "North Star" – 5:21

== Personnel ==
=== Musicians ===
- Justin Sullivan – vocals, guitar
- Nelson – bass
- Michael Dean – drums
- Dean White – keyboards
- Marshall Gill – guitars
