= Moose Harris =

British guitarist

- Born: Jason James Harris; Devizes, Wiltshire, England
- Genres: Alternative rock; punk rock
- Occupations: Musician; songwriter
- Instruments: Bass guitar; guitar; keyboards; backing vocals
- Years active: 1985–2017
- Labels: EMI; Abstract; Sanctuary

Moose Harris is a British bass guitarist, who was known as Jason James Harris until June 2001, when he legally changed his name to reflect his former nickname and adopted professional alias of "Moose".

== Biography ==
Harris was born in Devizes, and raised in Pewsey. He left Pewsey Vale School at 15, and had several jobs before beginning an apprenticeship as an electronics engineer in 1984. At the age of seventeen, Harris was recruited by New Model Army to replace original bass player Stuart Morrow (1980–85) who had left the band midway through the 1985 'No Rest for the Wicked' tour.

Harris toured extensively with the band over the next five years, playing at venues across Europe, the United States and Japan. He also contributed to New Model Army's milestone albums, The Ghost of Cain (1986) and Thunder and Consolation (1989), before leaving in 1990, when he was replaced by Peter "Nelson" Nice. In late 1992 he joined The Damned. Having recorded the Not of This Earth album with them during 1994, he left in mid-1995 following the dissolution of that line-up. When the band reformed in 1996, he was replaced by former The Damned and Eddie and the Hot Rods bassist, Paul Gray.

After The Damned split in 1995, Harris worked in music tuition, session work and music production. Although Dave Vanian offered Harris a chance to return to The Damned in 1996, the promised tour never materialised, and Vanian's future wife Patricia Morrison took over as bass guitarist soon after. Between 1996 and 2007, Harris was the bass guitarist for Pants. When Pants split, Harris and Oliver collaborated on the self-described "retro-futurist synth rock" duo The Pieshop Boys, appearing sporadically between 2008 and 2013. Pants reformed in 2014 and still perform occasionally.

Since 2000 Harris has contributed to a number of projects, including live and studio work with folk-rock group Pig Country, ska band Ska Trouble and punk band Bastard Squad. He also assisted with the restoration of a previously unreleased album by Raspberry Parade.

In 2005, Harris became one-third of the band Sleeper Cell with Nick Harper. The band toured briefly in 2005, including an appearance at the Beautiful Days Festival.

In 2011, Harris was interviewed for a documentary about New Model Army. The finished film, Between Dog and Wolf: the New Model Army Story premièred in London on 5 October 2014 as part of the Raindance Film Festival 2014. The documentary was released on DVD in December 2015.

== Albums ==
=== New Model Army ===
Studio albums

- The Ghost of Cain (1986)
- Thunder and Consolation (1989)

Live albums

- All of This – The "Live" Rarities (1999)

Compilations

- Radio Sessions '83-'84 (1985)
- B-Sides and Abandoned Tracks (1994)
- History - The Singles 85-91 (1992)
- New Model Army 3 x CD (2000)
- The Best (2001)
- Lost Songs (2002)
- Great Expectations – The Singles Collection (2003)
- Original 20 (2004)
- The Collection (2004)
- Anthology 1980-2010 (2010)

=== Atom Heart Mother ===
Studio albums

- Skin 'em Up, Chop 'em Out, Rawhide! (1992)

=== The Damned ===
Studio albums

- Not of This Earth (1995)

Live albums

- Molten Lager (1999)

Compilations

- CBGB's 20th Anniversary - Live (1995)
- Testify (1997)
- Industrial Mix Machine (1997)
- Vampire Themes (1997)
- Goths Undead (1997)

=== Session work ===
- Luminous - Big Wheel (1993)
- Monty - A Typical Scorpio (1993, tracks 'Come into My Parlour' and 'Can You Do The Mashed Potato?')
