= Vengeance (New Model Army album) =

Studio album by New Model Army
- Released: 4 April 1984
- Studio: Alaska Studios (Waterloo, London)
- Genre: Rock; post-punk
- Length: 30:11
- Label: Abstract
- Producer: Ray "Mond" Cowie; New Model Army

New Model Army chronology
Vengeance (1984)	No Rest for the Wicked (1985)

Professional ratings
Review scores
Source	Rating
AllMusic	3.5/5 stars

Vengeance is the debut studio album by the English rock band New Model Army, originally released on 4 April 1984 by the independent label Abstract Records. Following the band performing "Christian Militia" and "Small Town England" live on the Channel 4 programme The Tube, the album entered the UK Indie Chart at #1. The album was later re-released on CD as Vengeance – The Independent Story in 1987 expanded with the band's early singles, as well as the further expanded Vengeance – The Whole Story 1980–84 in 2012 including their radio sessions and early demos on a second CD.

== Singles ==
Singles included on the re-issue are the pre-album releases "Bittersweet" (backed with "Betcha" and "Tension") and "Great Expectations" (backed with "Waiting"), and the post-album single "The Price" (backed with "1984" and "No Man's Land").

== Critical reception ==
Spin wrote, "New Model Army does not make musical wallpaper. One of the most powerful and searing albums of 1984."

== Versions ==
The album was originally released in the UK in 1984 as a mini-LP.

The album was re-issued as an LP in 1987 with the added tracks "Great Expectations" and "Waiting", and as a renamed CD (Vengeance – The Independent Story) with the added tracks "Bittersweet", "Betcha", "Tension", "Great Expectations", "Waiting", "The Price", "1984", "No Man's Land" and Peel Session versions of "Great Expectations" and "Notice Me". The song "Running" on the original album was also renamed to "Running in the Rain" for this and subsequent re-issues.

In 1997, the CD version was packaged together with Radio Sessions '83–'84 (1988) as a limited edition double CD with a picture disc and titled Small Town England.

In 2002, the album was again re-issued with the three different remixes of "Vengeance" as bonus tracks.

== Track listing ==
=== Side one ===
1. "Christian Militia" (Justin Sullivan, Stuart Morrow) – 3:25
2. "Notice Me" (Sullivan, Morrow) – 2:36
3. "Small Town England" (Sullivan, Morrow) – 3:19
4. "A Liberal Education" (Sullivan, Morrow) – 5:27

=== Side two ===
5. "Vengeance" (Sullivan) – 4:06
6. "Sex (The Black Angel)" (Sullivan, Morrow, Robert Heaton) – 3:25
7. "Running in the Rain" (Sullivan) – 3:52
8. "Spirit of the Falklands" (Sullivan, Morrow) – 3:43

=== Vengeance – The Independent Story ===
1. "Bittersweet" (Sullivan, Morrow) – 3:06
2. "Betcha" (Sullivan, Morrow, Phil Tompkins) – 2:30
3. "Tension" (Sullivan, Morrow) – 2:11
4. "Great Expectations" (Sullivan, Morrow) – 3:12
5. "Waiting" (Sullivan) – 3:27
6. "Christian Militia" (Sullivan, Morrow) – 3:25
7. "Notice Me" (Sullivan, Morrow) – 2:36
8. "Small Town England" (Sullivan, Morrow) – 3:19
9. "A Liberal Education" (Sullivan, Morrow) – 5:27
10. "Vengeance" (Sullivan) – 4:06
11. "Sex (The Black Angel)" (Sullivan, Morrow, Heaton) – 3:25
12. "Running in the Rain" (Sullivan) – 3:52
13. "Spirit of the Falklands" (Sullivan, Morrow) – 3:43
14. "The Price" (Sullivan, Morrow) – 3:25
15. "1984" (Sullivan) – 3:16
16. "No Man's Land" (Sullivan) – 3:31
17. "Great Expectations" (The Peel Session) – 3:02
18. "Notice Me" (The Peel Session) – 2:38

=== 2002 bonus tracks ===
19. "Vengeance" (Right to Silence Remix) – 3:58
20. "Vengeance" (Rough Justice Remix) – 7:04
21. "Vengeance" (Right to Protest Remix) – 5:21

== Personnel ==
New Model Army

- Slade the Leveller – vocals; guitar
- Stuart Morrow – bass; vocals
- Rob Heaton – drums

Production

- Mond Cowie – producer on original album
- New Model Army – producer on all other tracks
- Ian O'Higgins – engineer
- Joolz – artwork (front cover)
