= Symphony (El Khoury) =

Bechara El Khoury's Symphony, subtitled The Ruins of Beirut, was composed in 1985. It was the third of a series of works inspired in the ongoing Lebanese Civil War, being preceded by tone poem Lebanon in flames and a Requiem. It is composed of four movements, marked Drammatico, Misterioso, Poetico and Tragique.

It was recorded for Naxos Records in 2002 by the National Symphony Orchestra of Ukraine, conducted by Vladimir Sirenko.
