= From Here =

Studio album by New Model Army
- Released: 23 August 2019
- Genre: Rock
- Labels: Attack Attack; earMUSIC
- Producers: Justin Sullivan; Joe Barresi

New Model Army chronology
Winter (2016)	From Here (2019)	Sinfonia (2023)

From Here ratings
Review scores
Source	Rating
Classic Rock	3.5/5 stars

From Here is the fifteenth studio album by British rock band New Model Army, released on 23 August 2019 by Attack Attack Records in the United Kingdom and by earMUSIC worldwide. The album was recorded on the Norwegian island of Giske at the Ocean Sound Recordings studio, with inspiration drawn from the isolation of the environment. The album reached number 13 in the UK album charts on the week of release.

== Track listing ==
All tracks written by New Model Army.

1. "Passing Through" – 6:00
2. "Never Arriving" – 5:00
3. "The Weather" – 4:48
4. "End of Days" – 4:12
5. "Great Disguise" – 4:36
6. "Conversation" – 4:12
7. "Where I Am" – 3:53
8. "Hard Way" – 5:17
9. "Watch and Learn" – 3:41
10. "Maps" – 3:54
11. "Setting Sun" – 6:08
12. "From Here" – 7:57

== Personnel ==
New Model Army

- Justin Sullivan — lead vocals, guitars, piano, synthesizer
- Marshall Gill — guitars, backing vocals
- Dean White — guitars, backing vocals, keyboards
- Ceri Monger — bass, backing vocals, percussion
- Michael Dean – drums, backing vocals, percussion

Guest Musicians

- Tobias Unterberger — cello

Production

- Jamie Lockhart – producer, recording engineer
- Lee Smith – producer, recording engineer, mixing engineer
- Felix Davies – mastering engineer
- Justin Sullivan – producer

== Charts ==
Chart (2019)	Peak position
Austrian Albums (Ö3 Austria)	43
German Albums (Offizielle Top 100)	6
Polish Albums (ZPAV)	39
Swiss Albums (Schweizer Hitparade)	19
UK Albums (Official Charts)	13
