= No Rest for the Wicked (New Model Army album) =

Studio album by New Model Army
- Released: May 1985
- Genre: Rock; post-punk
- Length: 40:19
- Label: EMI
- Producer: Mark Freegard; John Cornfield; New Model Army; Dr Volkmar Kramarz

New Model Army chronology
Vengeance (1984)	No Rest for the Wicked (1985)	The Ghost of Cain (1986)

No Rest for the Wicked is the second studio album by the English rock band New Model Army, released in May 1985. It was the band's first release on major record label EMI, and their last featuring bassist and founding member Stuart Morrow. The album reached #22 in the UK Albums Chart.

A key element on its cover is a quotation from Magna Carta (1215), "To no man will we sell, or deny, or delay right or justice".

== Singles ==
Singles released from the album are "No Rest" and Better Than Them (The Acoustic EP).

== Critical reception ==
Professional ratings
Review scores
Source	Rating
AllMusic	4.5/5 stars
Robert Christgau	B

Spin wrote, "Everything they do is full of echo. One can chalk that up to U2-syndrome of mid-80s record production. It's a shock to hear something intelligent and pointed in a release on a major label."

== Versions ==
The album was originally released in the UK in 1985 as an LP. A CD version was subsequently released in 1989.

In 2005 the album was remastered and reissued containing a bonus disc comprising rarities, B-sides and live tracks. Of the live tracks, "Vengeance" was recorded at Brixton Academy, London on 16 June 1990, "Smalltown England" and "Liberal Education" were recorded during the Impurity Tour in 1990, "Waiting" was recorded at Rock City, Nottingham on 20 April 1987 and "Betcha" was recorded at the Biskuithall, Bonn on 25 October 1988.

== Track listing ==
Original album

1. "Frightened" (Justin Sullivan, Stuart Morrow) – 3:41
2. "Ambition" (Sullivan) – 3:08
3. "Grandmother's Footsteps" (Sullivan, Morrow) – 4:21
4. "Better Than Them" (Sullivan, Robert Heaton) – 3:13
5. "My Country" (Sullivan, Morrow) – 3:40
6. "No Greater Love" (Sullivan, Morrow, Heaton) – 3:30
7. "No Rest" (Sullivan, Morrow, Heaton) – 5:20
8. "Young, Gifted and Skint" (Sullivan, Morrow) – 3:09
9. "Drag It Down" (Sullivan, Morrow, Heaton) – 3:29
10. "Shot 18" (Sullivan, Heaton) – 3:11
11. "The Attack" (Sullivan) – 3:36

Reissue bonus compact disc

1. "Heroin" (12" version) (Sullivan, Joolz Denby) – 5:30
2. "Adrenalin" (Sullivan) – 3:48
3. "No Sense" (Sullivan, Heaton) – 2:42
4. "Trust" (Sullivan) – 2:28
5. "Vengeance" (live) (Sullivan, Morrow) – 4:30
6. "Smalltown England" (live) (Sullivan, Morrow) – 4:11
7. "A Liberal Education" (live) (Sullivan, Morrow) – 6:43
8. "Waiting" (live) (Sullivan, Morrow) – 4:15
9. "Betcha" (live) (Sullivan, Morrow) – 4:11

== Personnel ==
Musicians

- Justin Sullivan – vocals, guitar
- Stuart Morrow – bass, vocals
- Robert Heaton – drums

Production

- Mark Freegard – producer and engineer on "Frightened", "Ambition", "Grandmother's Footsteps", "Better Than Them", "My Country", "No Greater Love", "No Rest", "Young, Gifted and Skint", "Drag it Down", "Shot 18", "The Attack", "Heroin" (12" Version), "Adrenalin", "No Sense" and "Trust"
- John Cornfield – producer on "Smalltown England" (live) and "Liberal Education" (live)
- New Model Army – producer on "Smalltown England" (live) and "Liberal Education" (live)
- Dr Volkmar Kramarz – producer on "Betcha" (live)
