= Carnival (New Model Army album) =

Studio album by New Model Army
- Released: 6 September 2005
- Genre: Rock
- Length: 49:35
- Label: Attack Attack
- Producer: Chris Tsangarides, New Model Army

New Model Army chronology
Great Expectations – The Singles Collection (2003)	Carnival (2005)	High (2007)

Professional ratings
Review scores
Source	Rating
Allmusic	4/5 stars

Carnival was released in 2005 and is the ninth studio album by British rock band, New Model Army. The album was co-produced by Chris Tsangarides and New Model Army.

It was remixed and "reimagined" in 2020, titled Carnival Redux, and features four additional tracks.

== Singles and EPs ==
Two tracks from the album have been released as singles: "Island" (July 2005), which was available only as a digital download, and two versions of "BD3" (May 2006). An EP was also released, titled BD3 EP.

== Track listing ==
All tracks written by Justin Sullivan and Michael Dean except where otherwise noted.

1. "Water" – 4:30
2. "BD3" – 3:30
3. "Prayer Flags" – 3:51
4. "Carlisle Road" (Sullivan) – 4:04
5. "Red Earth" – 5:05
6. "Too Close to the Sun" (Sullivan) – 4:01
7. "Bluebeat" – 5:00
8. "Another Imperial Day" – 4:51
9. "LS43" (Sullivan) – 3:53
10. "Island" – 5:24
11. "Fireworks Night" – 5:26

== Track listing of Carnival Redux ==
All tracks written by Justin Sullivan and Michael Dean except where otherwise noted.

1. "Water"
2. "BD3"
3. "Rumour and Rapture (1650)" (Sullivan)
4. "Red Earth"
5. "LS43" (Sullivan)
6. "Island"
7. "Carlisle Road" (Sullivan)
8. "One Bullet" (Sullivan)
9. "Bluebeat"
10. "Too Close to the Sun" (Sullivan)
11. "Another Imperial Day"
12. "Prayer Flags"
13. "Stoned, Fired and Full of Grace" (Sullivan)
14. "Caslen (Christmas)" (Nice/Sullivan)
15. "Fireworks Night"

== Personnel ==
=== Production ===
- Chris Tsangarides – producer
- New Model Army – producer

=== Musicians ===
- Justin Sullivan – vocals, guitar, keyboards
- Dean White – guitar
- Michael Dean – drums
- Nelson – bass
- Dave Blomberg – guitar
- Tobias Unterberg – cello on "Too Close to the Sun"
- Ty Unwin – music box on "Bluebeat", strings on "Another Imperial Day"

=== Weekly charts ===
Weekly chart performance for Carnival
Chart (2005)	Peak position
German Albums (Offizielle Top 100)	44
