= Between Wine and Blood =

Studio album by New Model Army
- Released: 5 September 2014
- Genre: Rock
- Label: Attack Attack
- Producer: Justin Sullivan, Michael Dean

New Model Army chronology
Between Dog and Wolf (2013)	Between Wine and Blood (2014)	Winter (2016)

Professional ratings
Review scores
Source	Rating
Louder Than War	9/10 stars
God is in the TV	4/5 stars
Laut magazine	3/5 stars

Between Wine and Blood is a mixed studio and live album by British rock band New Model Army, released on 5 September 2014 by Attack Attack Records. It comprises six new studio tracks and live versions of eleven tracks from the previous year's album Between Dog and Wolf.

== Track listing ==
All tracks written by New Model Army

Studio tracks

1. "According to You" – 3:52
2. "Angry Planet" – 5:25
3. "Guessing" – 3:30
4. "Happy to Be Here" – 6:02
5. "Devil's Bargain" – 5:29
6. "Sunrise" – 4:58

Live tracks

1. "Stormclouds" – 4:11
2. "March in September" – 4:33
3. "Did You Make It Safe?" – 3:43
4. "I Need More Time" – 5:08
5. "Pull the Sun" – 5:26
6. "Lean Back and Fall" – 5:09
7. "Seven Times" – 3:48
8. "Between Dog and Wolf" – 6:04
9. "Summer Moors" – 5:13
10. "Knievel" – 3:29
11. "Horsemen" – 4:47

== Personnel ==
=== New Model Army ===
- Justin Sullivan – vocals, guitar
- Ceri Monger – bass, percussion, backing vocals, dulcimer
- Michael Dean – drums, percussion, backing vocals
- Dean White – keyboards, guitar, backing vocals, percussion
- Marshall Gill – guitar, backing vocals

=== Additional musicians ===
- Ed Alleyne-Johnson – violin
- Tobias Unterberg – cello
- Stuart Eastham – bass (bowed)

=== Production ===
- Justin Sullivan – producer
- Michael Dean – producer
- Joe Barresi – mixing

== Chart performance ==
Chart performance for Between Wine and Blood
Chart (2014)	Peak position
Belgian Albums (Ultratop Wallonia)	180
German Albums (Offizielle Top 100)	46
Scottish Albums (OCC)	80
UK Albums (OCC)	45
UK Independent Albums (OCC)	8
