= Winter (New Model Army album) =

Studio album by New Model Army
- Released: 26 August 2016
- Genre: Rock
- Label: Attack Attack, EarMUSIC
- Producer: Justin Sullivan, Joe Barresi

New Model Army chronology
Between Wine and Blood (2014)	Winter (2016)	From Here (2019)

Winter is the 14th studio album by British rock band New Model Army, released on 26 August 2016 by Attack Attack Records in the United Kingdom and by EarMUSIC worldwide. It was named the number-one album of 2016 by The Big Takeover.

== Reception ==
Professional ratings
Aggregate scores
Source	Rating
Metacritic	65/100
Review scores
Source	Rating
Blurt	4/5 stars
Classic Rock	4/5 stars
Record Collector	4/5 stars

Winter received mixed to positive reviews from critics. On Metacritic, the album holds a score of 65/100 based on 5 reviews, indicating "generally favourable reviews".

== Track listing ==
All tracks written by New Model Army.

1. "Beginning" – 7:00
2. "Burn the Castle" – 3:12
3. "Winter" – 4:20
4. "Part the Waters" – 4:26
5. "Eyes Get Used to the Darkness" – 4:40
6. "Drifts" – 4:26
7. "Born Feral" – 6:25
8. "Die Trying" – 3:35
9. "Devil" – 4:33
10. "Strogoula" – 4:11
11. "Echo November" – 3:00
12. "Weak and Strong" – 4:12
13. "After Something" – 4:00

== Personnel ==
=== New Model Army ===
- Justin Sullivan – vocals, guitar, keyboards, harmonica
- Ceri Monger – bass, percussion, dulcimer, backing vocals
- Michael Dean – drums, percussion, backing vocals
- Dean White – keyboards, guitar, backing vocals, percussion
- Marshall Gill – guitar, percussion, backing vocals

=== Production ===
- Justin Sullivan – production, recording

== Charts ==
Chart (2016)	Peak position
Austrian Albums (Ö3 Austria)	66
Belgian Albums (Ultratop Flanders)	143
Belgian Albums (Ultratop Wallonia)	93
German Albums (Offizielle Top 100)	20
Scottish Albums (OCC)	22
Swiss Albums (Schweizer Hitparade)	53
UK Albums (OCC)	25
UK Album Downloads (OCC)	100
UK Independent Albums (OCC)	7
UK Rock & Metal Albums (OCC)	2
UK Vinyl Albums	3
