= Impurity (New Model Army album) =

Studio album by New Model Army
- Released: September 1990
- Recorded: Sawmills Studio (Cornwall)
- Genre: Rock; post-punk; folk rock
- Length: 48:23
- Label: EMI
- Producer: New Model Army; Pat Collier

New Model Army chronology
Thunder and Consolation (1989)	Impurity (1990)	Raw Melody Men (1991)

Singles from Impurity
- 1. "Get Me Out" Released: 1990; 2. "Purity" Released: 1990

Professional ratings
Review scores
Source	Rating
AllMusic	4/5 stars
The Encyclopedia of Popular Music	2/5 stars
MusicHound Rock: The Essential Album Guide	3/5 stars
Select	3/5 medals

Impurity is a studio album by the British rock band New Model Army, released in 1990.

It was the first album without bassist Jason Harris, who had been replaced by Peter Nice (better known as "Nelson"). It was the band's last studio album with EMI.

The album sees the band venturing further into the musical territory which they began exploring on their previous album, Thunder and Consolation (1989). Violinist Ed Alleyne-Johnson was again a collaborator. It also contained the guitar work of Adrian Portas.

The album reached #23 on the UK albums chart in October 1990.

== Critical reception ==
Trouser Press wrote that the album "exemplifies a fervent, trend- bucking band that has remained true to its original goals."

== Singles ==
The singles released from the album were "Get Me Out" (September 1990), "Purity" (October 1990) and "Space" (June 1991).

== Versions ==
The LP contained 11 tracks, the CD version included the bonus track "Marrakesh".

The German gatefold-version of the LP had a slightly different cover-artwork. The band logo is printed in light-grey instead of the other version's red logo.

The album was remastered and reissued in 2005 with a bonus disc containing rarities, B-sides and live tracks.

== Track listing ==
All tracks are written by Justin Sullivan and Robert Heaton.

Timings taken from 1990 CD version
No.	Title	Length
1.	"Get Me Out"	3:19
2.	"Space" (Written by Nelson alongside Sullivan and Heaton)	3:25
3.	"Innocence"	4:52
4.	"Purity"	4:47
5.	"Whirlwind"	4:14
6.	"Marrakesh"	3:13
7.	"Lust for Power"	4:10
8.	"Bury the Hatchet"	3:18
9.	"Eleven Years"	3:51
10.	"Lurhstaap"	4:36
11.	"Before I Get Old"	3:53
12.	"Vanity"	5:31
Total length:		49:09

2005 bonus disc
No.	Title	Length
1.	"Prison"	4:13
2.	"Curse"	3:53
3.	"Far Better Thing"	5:18
4.	"Lurhstaap (acoustic version)"	3:46
5.	"Whirlwind (live)"	4:06
6.	"Space (live)"	3:45
7.	"Get Me Out (live)"	3:31
8.	"Purity (live)"	4:14
9.	"Innocence (live)"	4:22
10.	"Lurhstaap (live)"	4:34
Total length:		41:42

== Personnel ==
=== Production ===
- New Model Army – producer
- Pat Collier – producer, mixed by, recorded by (additional)
- Jessica Corcoran – engineer
- John Cornfield – recorded by
- Tim Young – mastered by
- Joolz Denby – artwork
- Keith Faulkener – layout, artwork processing
- Michael Faulkener – layout, artwork processing

=== Musicians ===
- Justin Sullivan – vocals, guitar, keyboards
- Robert Heaton – drums, guitar, backing vocals
- Nelson – bass, guitar, keyboards, spoons, backing vocals
- Ed Alleyne-Johnson – violins
- Adrian Portas – guitar
- Joolz Denby – voice on "Space"

=== Weekly charts ===
Weekly chart performance for Impurity
Chart (1990)	Peak position
German Albums (Offizielle Top 100)	16
