= Strange Brotherhood =

Studio album by New Model Army (band)
- Released: 13 April 1998
- Genre: Rock
- Length: 56:59
- Label: Attack Attack
- Producers: Simon Dawson, Mike Gregovich

New Model Army (band) chronology
B-Sides and Abandoned Tracks (1994)	Strange Brotherhood (1998)	All of This – The "Live" Rarities (1999)

Professional ratings
Review scores
Source	Rating
Allmusic	2.5/5 stars

Strange Brotherhood is the seventh studio album by British rock band New Model Army. Released in 1998, it was the first on their own independent label, Attack Attack Records.

The album was produced by Simon Dawson except for the tracks "Whites of Their Eyes" and "Queen of My Heart" which were produced by Mike Gregovich. The album featured the guest guitarist, Dave Blomberg, and also an orchestral arrangement.

This album is also notable in being the last studio album to feature long-serving New Model Army member Robert Heaton.

== Singles ==
"Wonderful Way to Go" was released as a single in March 1998 with two separate releases as "Part One of Two" and "Part Two of Two" and "Queen of My Heart" and "Brother" were released as a double A-side in May 1998.

== Versions ==
The album was originally released as a 12-track CD in May 1998 along with a limited edition digipak two CD version including sticker and lyric booklet. The bonus CD containing "See You in Hell", "Sunset", and live versions of "Ballad of Bodmin Pill" and "The Hunt".

A limited edition fan club version was released in July 1998 as a triple LP with the original tracks on the first two records and adding the tracks "Brother", "Southwest", "Rainy Night 65", "Refugee", "Sunset", "Caslen" and "See You in Hell" on the third record.

== Track listing ==
=== Standard CD version ===
1. "Wonderful Way to Go" (Justin Sullivan, Robert Heaton) – 5:44
2. "Whites of Their Eyes" (Sullivan, Heaton) – 4:41
3. "Aimless Desire" (Sullivan, Heaton) – 5:05
4. "Over the Wire" (Sullivan, Heaton) – 3:27
5. "Queen of My Heart" (Sullivan, Heaton) – 4:15
6. "Gigabyte Wars" (Sullivan, Heaton) – 4:15
7. "Killing" (Sullivan, Heaton, Nelson, Dave Blomberg) – 5:43
8. "No Pain" (Sullivan) – 4:55
9. "Headlights" (Sullivan, Heaton, Nelson) – 5:35
10. "Big Blue" (Sullivan, Heaton) – 4:21
11. "Long Goodbye" (Sullivan) – 3:18
12. "Lullaby" (Sullivan) – 5:40

=== Bonus CD ===
1. "See You in Hell" (Sullivan, Heaton)
2. "Sunset" (Sullivan)
3. "Ballad of Bodmin Pill" (live) (Sullivan, Heaton)
4. "The Hunt" (live) (Sullivan, Heaton)

=== Third record from fan club edition ===
==== Side one ====
1. "Brother" (Sullivan)
2. "Southwest" (Sullivan)
3. "Rainy Night 65" (Sullivan, Heaton)

==== Side two ====
1. "Refugee" (Sullivan, Heaton)
2. "Sunset" (Sullivan, Heaton)
3. "Caslen" (Nelson)
4. "See You in Hell" (Sullivan, Heaton)

== Personnel ==
- Justin Sullivan – vocals, guitar, keyboards, harmonica
- Robert Heaton – drums, guitar, synthesizer, harmonica, backing vocals
- Nelson – bass, guitar, percussion, violin, backing vocals
- Dave Blomberg – guitar, keyboards, backing vocals
- Dean White – keyboards, clarinet
- Rachel Auty (her name was mistyped on the cd release and said Hunter. It was corrected on the vinyl release), Tobias Unterberg, Samantha Rowe, Ed Wolstenholme, Becky Pugh – string section
- Ed Collins, Simon Pugsley, Stuart Edge – brass section

=== Production ===
- Simon Dawson – producer ("Wonderful Way to Go", "Aimless Desire", "Over the Wire", "Gigabyte Wars", "Killing", "No Pain", "Headlights", "Big Blue", "Long Goodbye", "Lullaby"), mixed by ("No Pain", "Big Blue")
- Mike Gregovich – producer ("White of Their Eyes", "Queen of My Heart"), mixed by ("Wonderful Way to Go", "Whites of Their Eyes", "Queen of My Heart", "Gigabyte Wars", "Killing", "Headlights", "Long Goodbye", "Lullaby")
- Mark Dodson – mixed by ("Aimless Desire", "Over the Wire")
- Dave Blomberg – editor

=== Weekly charts ===
Weekly chart performance for Strange Brotherhood
Chart (1998)	Peak position
German Albums (Offizielle Top 100)	41
