= The Ghost of Cain =

Studio album by New Model Army
- Released: 1 September 1986
- Genre: Rock; post-punk
- Length: 35:30
- Label: EMI
- Producer: Glyn Johns

New Model Army chronology
No Rest for the Wicked (1985)	The Ghost of Cain (1986)	Radio Sessions '83-'84 (1988)

Professional ratings
Review scores
Source	Rating
AllMusic	link
Robert Christgau	A−

The Ghost of Cain is the third studio album by the English rock band New Model Army. Released in 1986, The Ghost of Cain propelled the band to the forefront of the alternative rock scene in the 1980s. Not least thanks to the widely acclaimed underground hit song, "51st State", which is the only song by the band to date to feature lyrics not written by the band themselves; the lyrics were written by Ashley Cartwright of The Shakes.

It was the first album to feature new bassist, Jason 'Moose' Harris. It also features former Nine Below Zero member Mark Feltham as a guest musician on harmonica on songs "Poison Street" and "Ballad".

Brazilian thrash metal band Sepultura covered the song "The Hunt" on their 1993 album, Chaos A.D. UK folk metal band Skyclad covered the song "Master Race" on their Oui Avant-Garde á Chance album in 1996.

== Singles and EPs ==
Two tracks were released as singles: "51st State" and "Poison Street".

An EP was also released in the U.S., featuring the tracks "Lights Go Out" (extended mix), "Poison Street" (extended mix), "Poison Street" (single mix), "Courage" and "Lights Go Out" (dub mix).

== Versions ==
The album was originally released on vinyl and cassette in September 1986 with 10 tracks, and on CD in April 1987.

A remastered version with a bonus disc containing rarities, B-sides and live tracks was released in May 2005.

== Track listing ==
=== Original album ===
1. "The Hunt" (Justin Sullivan, Robert Heaton) – 4:11
2. "Lights Go Out" (Sullivan, Heaton) – 3:55
3. "51st State" (Ashley Cartwright, New Model Army) – 2:32
4. "All of This" (Sullivan, Heaton) – 3:32
5. "Poison Street" (Sullivan, Heaton) – 3:04
6. "Western Dream" (Sullivan, Heaton) – 3:53
7. "Lovesongs" (Sullivan, Heaton) – 3:00
8. "Heroes" (Sullivan) – 4:04
9. "Ballad" (Sullivan) – 3:53
10. "Master Race" (Sullivan) – 2:59

=== 2005 CD bonus tracks ===
1. "Brave New World" (Sullivan, Heaton, Jason Harris, Joolz Denby) – 3:27
2. "Brave New World 2" (Sullivan, Heaton, Harris, Denby) – 3:26
3. "R.I.P" (Sullivan, Heaton) – 4:11
4. "Ten Commandments" (Sullivan) – 3:43
5. "Courage" (Sullivan, Heaton) – 3:18
6. "Poison Street" (12" Version) (Sullivan, Heaton) – 4:05
7. "Lights Go Out" (US mix) (Sullivan, Heaton) – 6:31
8. "The Hunt" (live) (Sullivan, Heaton) – 4:21
9. "All of This" (live) (Sullivan, Heaton) – 3:50
10. "Lovesongs" (live) (Sullivan, Heaton) – 4:00
11. "51st State" (live) (Cartwright, New Model Army) – 2:35

== Personnel ==
=== Musicians ===
- Justin Sullivan – vocals, guitar
- Robert Heaton – drums
- Jason 'Moose' Harris – bass
- Mark Feltham – harmonica on "Poison Street" and "Ballad"

=== Production ===
- Glyn Johns – producer, engineer
- Stuart Stawman – engineer
- Ethan Johns – additional engineering
- Joolz Denby – cover design
- Francesca Sullivan – cover photography

== Charts ==
Chart performance for The Ghost of Cain
Chart (2026)	Peak position
Croatian International Albums (HDU)	28
