= Symphonia =

Word used for various musical instruments

Symphonia (Greek συμφωνία) is a much-discussed word, applied at different times to the bagpipe, the drum, the hurdy-gurdy, and finally a kind of clavichord. The sixth of the musical instruments enumerated in Book of Daniel, Daniel 3 (verses 5, 10 and 15), translated "dulcimer" in the 17th-century King James Bible; in all probability it refers to the bagpipe.

The symphonia, signifying drum, is mentioned in Isidore of Seville's Etymologiae under the entries for tympanum and sambuca.

"Symphonia" or chifonie was applied during the 13th and 14th centuries, in the Latin countries more especially, to the hurdy-gurdy. "Symphonia" is applied by Praetorius to an instrument which he classed with the clavichord, spinet, regal and virginals, but without giving any clue to its distinctive characteristics.
