= Thunder and Consolation =

Studio album by New Model Army
- Released: 6 February 1989
- Recorded: Sawmills Studio (Cornwall; The Manor (Oxfordshire)
- Genre: Post-punk; folk rock
- Length: 44:40
- Label: EMI
- Producer: Tom Dowd; New Model Army

New Model Army chronology
Radio Sessions '83–'84 (1988)	Thunder and Consolation (1989)	Impurity (1990)

Singles from Thunder and Consolation
- 1. "White Coats" Released: June 1987; 2. "Stupid Questions" Released: January 1989; 3. "Vagabonds" Released: March 1989; 4. "Green and Grey" Released: June 1989

Professional ratings
Review scores
Source	Rating
AllMusic	4.5/5 stars
Robert Christgau	B+
Record Mirror	4/5 stars

Thunder and Consolation is the fourth studio album by the English rock band New Model Army, released on 6 February 1989 by EMI Records. The album stands as a landmark in the New Model Army catalogue, being their most successful album to date and reaching No. 20 in the UK Albums Chart. It also saw the band gaining new musical grounds as they adopted a more folky sound with the assistance of violinist Ed Alleyne-Johnson. It was produced by Tom Dowd and the band.

This was also the last studio album on which Jason 'Moose' Harris played bass. He was subsequently replaced by Nelson on the band's next studio album, Impurity (1990).

The title of the album was taken from 17th century British Quaker, Edward Burrough, whose collected works, which were posthumously released in 1663, were entitled The Memorable Works of a Son of Thunder and Consolation.

== Versions ==
The album was originally released as a 10-track LP and cassette in 1989 containing the tracks "I Love the World", "Stupid Questions", "225", "Inheritance", "Green and Grey", "Ballad of Bodmin Pill", "Family", "Family Life", "Vagabonds" and "Archway Towers". The cassette had an extra track, "125 MPH".

The CD version of the album was released at the same time with the extra tracks "The Charge", "Chinese Whispers" and "White Coats", which were taken from the New Model Army EP (1987), and the track "Nothing Touches", which was the B-side of the single "Stupid Questions" (1989).

In 2005 the album was remastered and reissued with the original LP tracks on one disc and including an extra disc containing the original CD's extra tracks along with rarities, B-sides and live tracks.

== Track listing ==
Timings taken from original CD release

Original album

1. "I Love the World" (Justin Sullivan, Robert Heaton) – 5:08
2. "Stupid Questions" (Sullivan) – 3:26
3. "225" (Sullivan, Heaton) – 4:47
4. "Inheritance" (Sullivan, Heaton) – 3:23
5. "Green and Grey" (Sullivan, Heaton) – 5:47
6. "Ballad of Bodmin Pill" (Sullivan, Heaton) – 4:47
7. "Family" (Sullivan, Heaton) – 4:01
8. "Family Life" (Sullivan) – 3:00
9. "Vagabonds" (Sullivan) – 5:21
10. "Archway Towers" (Sullivan, Heaton) – 4:54

Reissue bonus compact disc

1. "White Coats" (Sullivan, Heaton, Jason Harris) – 4:17
2. "The Charge" (Sullivan, Heaton) – 3:25
3. "Chinese Whispers" (Sullivan, Heaton) – 3:31
4. "Nothing Touches" (Sullivan) – 4:10
5. "Mermaid Song" (traditional) – 1:23
6. "Adrenalin" (electric version) (Sullivan) – 4:26
7. "Deadeye" (Sullivan) – 4:52
8. "Higher Wall" (Sullivan, Harris) – 4:23
9. "125 MPH" (Sullivan, Heaton, Harris) – 3:56
10. "I Love the World" (live) (Sullivan, Heaton) – 5:18
11. "Green and Grey" (live) (Sullivan, Heaton) – 5:34
12. "Archway Towers" (live) (Sullivan, Heaton) – 4:42
13. "Vagabonds" (live) (Sullivan) – 4:55
14. "225" (live) (Sullivan, Heaton) – 4:03

== Personnel ==
=== Production ===
- New Model Army – producer
- Tom Dowd – producer ("Stupid Questions", "Green and Grey", "Ballad of Bodmin Pill", "Family", "Vagabonds", "Archway Towers"), mixed by ("Inheritance")
- Andy Wallace – mixed by ("I Love the World", "Ballad of Bodmin Pill", "Family", "Family Life", "Archway Towers", "125 MPH")
- Jon Kelly – mixed by ("Stupid Questions", "225", "Green and Grey", "Vagabonds")
- Justin Sullivan – mixed by ("225")
- Robert Heaton – mixed by ("225")

=== Musicians ===
- Justin Sullivan – vocals, guitar, keyboards
- Robert Heaton – drums, backing vocals, guitar, bass
- Moose Harris – bass, keyboards, guitar
- Ed Alleyne-Johnson – violin

=== Weekly charts ===
Weekly chart performance for Thunder And Consolation
Chart (1989)	Peak position
German Albums (Offizielle Top 100)	29
