= 51st State (song) =

Single by New Model Army

from the album The Ghost of Cain
- B-side: "Ten Commandments" "A Liberal Education" (live) "No Rest" (live) "No Man's Land" (live)
- Released: September 1986
- Genre: Post-punk
- Label: EMI
- Songwriters: Ashley Cartwright, New Model Army
- Producer: Glyn Johns

New Model Army singles chronology
"Brave New World" (1985)	"51st State" (1986)	"Poison Street" (1987)

"51st State" is a single by New Model Army, which appeared on their 1986 album The Ghost of Cain. The lyrics to the song stated that the UK was the 51st state of the United States and were believed to be behind a ban by the American Musician's Union on the band, which prevented them touring the Ghost of Cain album in the United States.

When asked what the song is about Justin Sullivan said in 1987: "It's a prophecy about England and also Germany and the rest of the world, that we all will become states of America. It not true now and I hope it will remain untrue."

The track was released as a single through EMI and reached number 71 on the UK Singles Chart, spending just two weeks in the listing. It was the band's fourth appearance on that chart.

Originally this song was written by Ashley Cartwright and performed by his band called The Shakes, from whom New Model Army took the song after The Shakes broke up in 1983.

== Formats and track listing ==
UK 7" single (NMA 4)

1. "51st State" (Ashley Cartwright, New Model Army)
2. "Ten Commandments" (Justin Sullivan)

UK 12" single (12 NMAS 4)

1. "51st State"
2. "Ten Commandments"
3. "A Liberal Education" (live) (Sullivan, Stuart Morrow)
4. "No Rest" (live) (Sullivan, Morrow, Robert Heaton)
5. "No Man's Land" (live) (Sullivan)

UK 12" single doublepack (12 NMA 4D)

Disc one

1. "51st State"
2. "Ten Commandments"

Disc two (PSLP 348)

1. "A Liberal Education" (live)
2. "No Rest" (live)
3. "No Man's Land" (live)

Holland 12" single (2018046)

1. "51st State"
2. "Ten Commandments"
3. "A Liberal Education" (live)
4. "No Rest" (live)
