= New Model Army (band) =

English rock band

- New Model Army performing in 2022, left to right: Dean White (keyboards and guitar), Michael Dean (drums), Justin Sullivan (vocals and guitar), Ceri Monger (bass).

Background information
- Origin: Bradford, England
- Genres: Punk rock; post-punk; folk rock; folk punk
- Years active: 1980–present
- Labels: Abstract; EMI; Epic; Eagle; earMUSIC; Attack Attack
- Members: Justin Sullivan; Michael Dean; Dean White; Ceri Monger
- Past members: Robert Heaton; Phil Tompkins; Rob Waddington; Stuart Morrow; Ed Alleyne-Johnson; Jason Harris; Adrian Portas; Dave Blomberg; Nelson; Marshall Gill
- Website: newmodelarmy.org

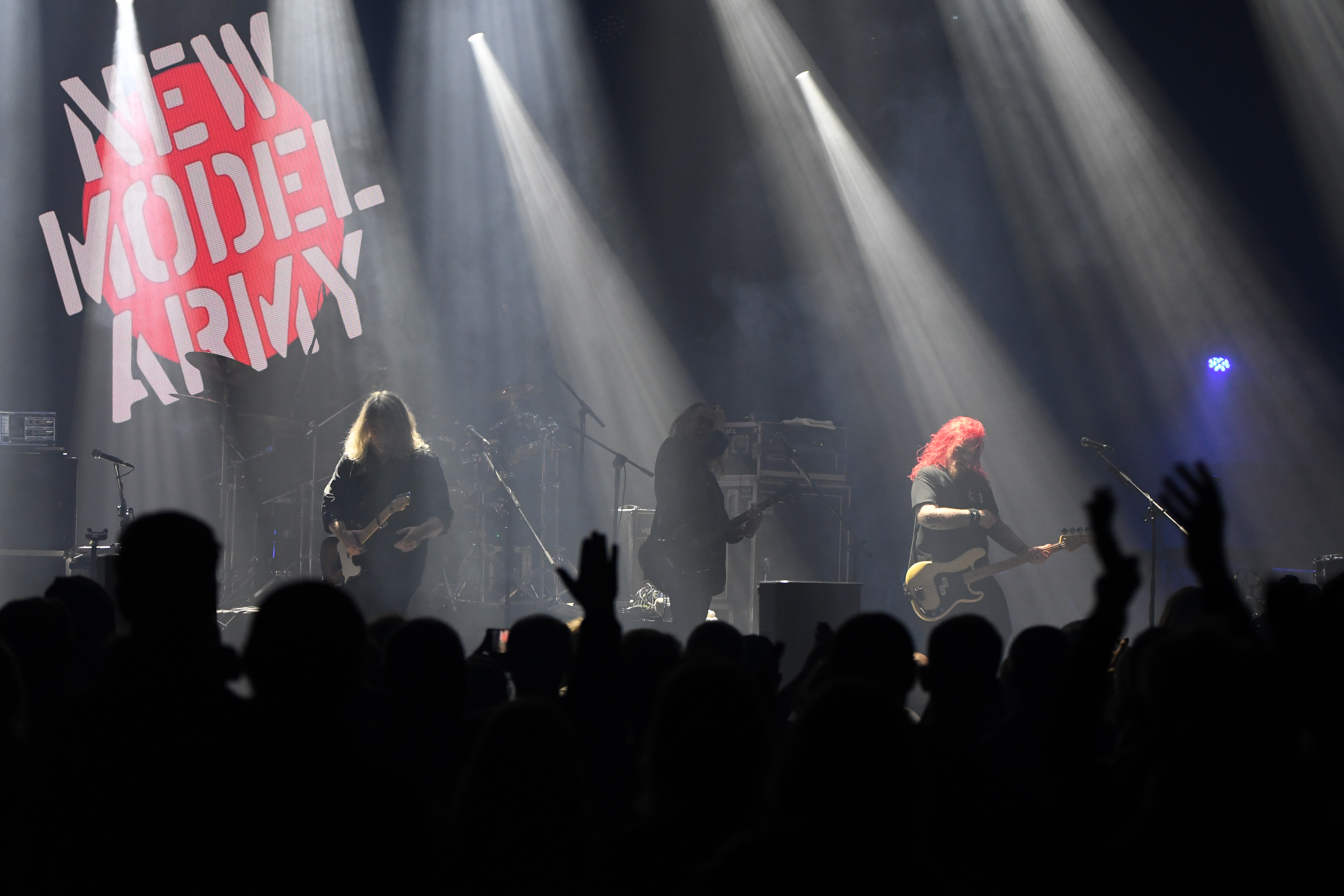
New Model Army, 2023

New Model Army are an English rock band formed in Bradford, West Yorkshire, in 1980 by lead vocalist, guitarist and principal songwriter Justin Sullivan, bassist Stuart Morrow and drummer Phil Tompkins. Sullivan has been the only continuous member of the band, which has seen numerous line-up changes in its four-decade history. Their music draws on influences across the musical spectrum, from punk and folk to soul, metal and classical. Sullivan's lyrics, which range from directly political through to spiritual and personal, have always been considered as a key part of the band's appeal.

Whilst having their roots in punk rock, the band have always been difficult to categorise. In 1999, when asked about this, Sullivan said, "We've been labelled as punks, post-punks, Goth, metal, folk – the lot, but we've always been beyond those style confines". Following a large turnover of personnel, both permanent and as touring members, as of 2024 New Model Army comprise Sullivan, Dean White (keyboards and guitar), Michael Dean (drums) and Ceri Monger (bass).

== History ==
=== Formation and Vengeance (1980–1984) ===
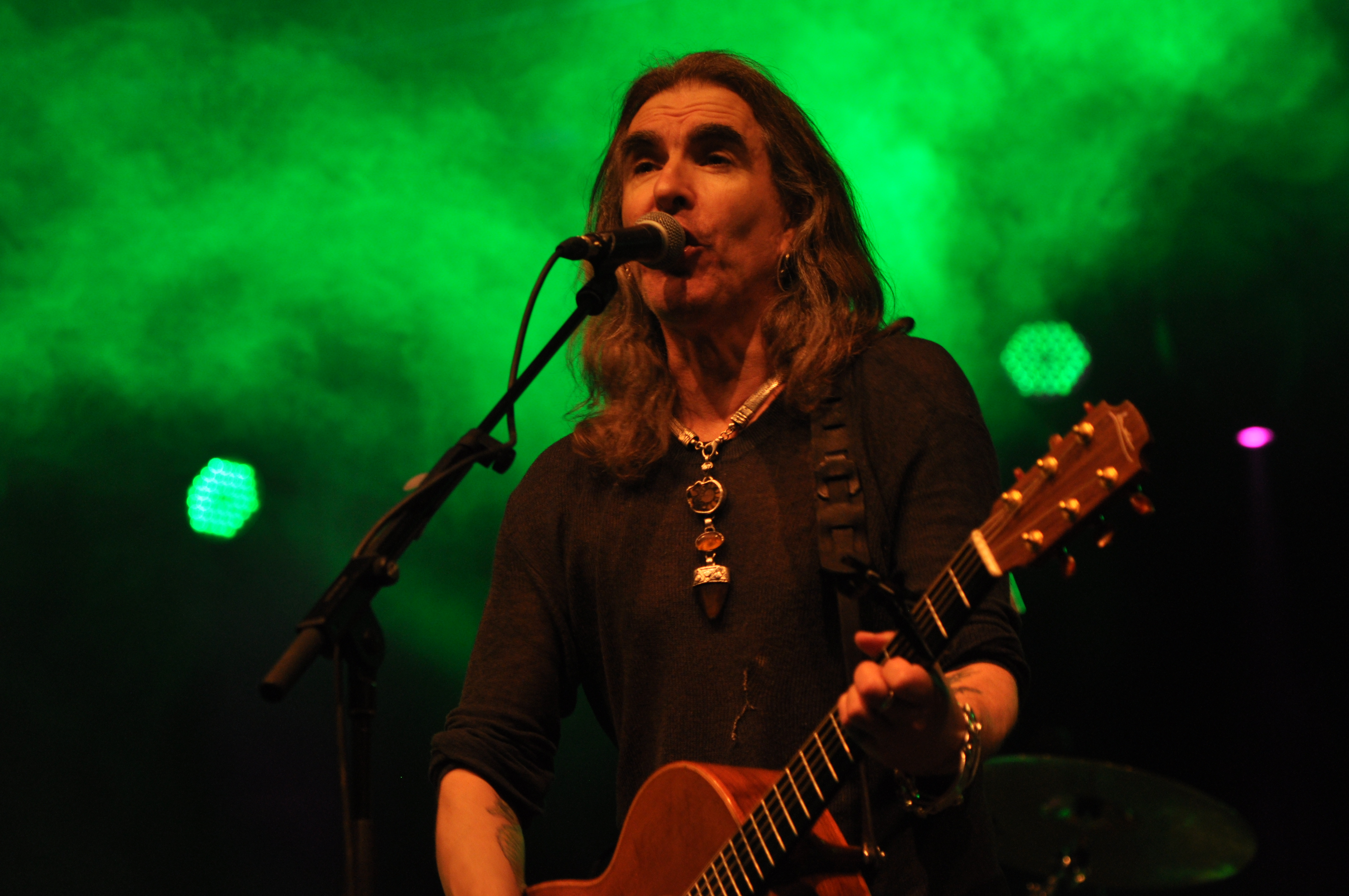
Sullivan performing live at the Blacksheep Festival in Bad Rappenau, Germany, 2014

The band were formed in Bradford, West Yorkshire in the autumn of 1980, taking their name from the standing army formed in 1645 by the Parliamentarians during the First English Civil War, and played their first concert in Bradford in October of that year, playing songs based on their shared love of punk rock and Northern soul.

After a few months in the band, original drummer Phil Tompkins lost interest and quit, to be replaced by Rob Waddington. By the time they began making their first records in 1983, Robert Heaton, a former drum technician for space rock band Hawkwind, had replaced Waddington.

Until the mid-1980s, Sullivan used the alter ego of "Slade the Leveller" (Levellers being a radical political movement of the 1640s), supposedly so that he would not lose his unemployment benefits if the authorities realized he was making money from music. They continued to gig around the United Kingdom with little recognition, but in 1983 released their first singles "Bittersweet" and "Great Expectations" on Abstract Records, and were given airplay by BBC Radio 1's disc jockey (DJ) and radio presenter John Peel.

In February 1984, they were invited to play on popular music television programme The Tube, being introduced by Scottish host Muriel Gray as "the ugliest band in rock and roll". The producers of the show however were concerned about the lyrics of "Vengeance", which the band were due to perform ("I believe in justice / I believe in vengeance / I believe in getting the bastards") and so the band played "Christian Militia" instead.

Following this performance, the band's debut studio album Vengeance reached Number 1 in the UK independent chart in early 1984, pushing the Smiths from that position. After a further single "The Price" also reached a high placing in the independent charts, the band signed a recording contract with major label EMI.

=== The major label years (1985–1993) ===
The band then made four studio albums (plus a live album) for EMI and one studio album for Epic Records, in a period of eight years. 1985's No Rest for the Wicked and associated single "No Rest" both made the mainstream top 30 in the UK, the latter leading to some controversy when the band sported T-shirts with the phrase "Only Stupid Bastards Use Heroin" during an appearance on Top of the Pops. During the "No Rest" tour, bassist Stuart Morrow left the band, and was replaced by 17-year-old Jason "Moose" Harris. However the band were refused work permits to enter the United States, as the US Immigration Department had said the band's work was of "no artistic merit".

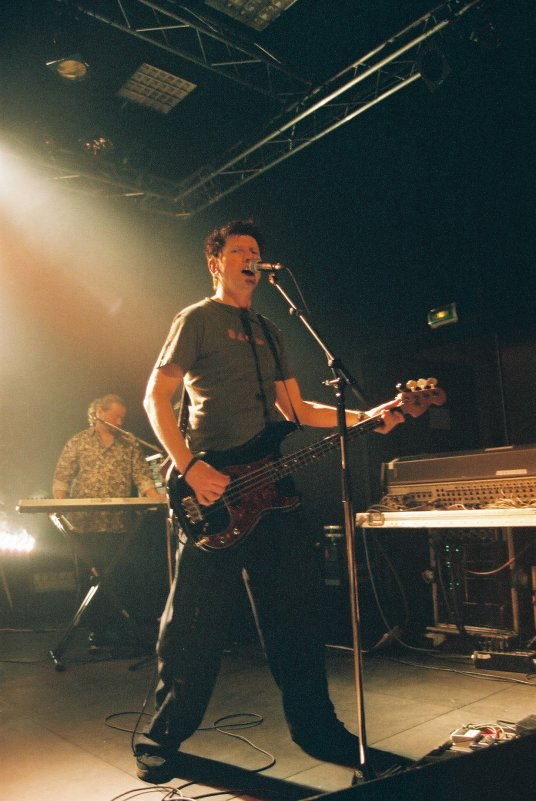
Nelson, bassist from 1990 to 2011

In December 1986, the band finally got permission to tour in the US. By this time The Ghost of Cain, produced by Glyn Johns, had been released, and was named best album of the year for 1986 in The Times by David Sinclair, who said that it "was the best thing to happen to English rock music since the first Clash album". Concerts included the Reading Festival and a gig with David Bowie in front of the Reichstag in Berlin, and the band for the first time expanded their touring line-up to include a second guitarist in the shape of Ricky Warwick, as well as harmonica player Mark Feltham from blues band Nine Below Zero.

Thunder and Consolation was released in February 1989, and saw the band moving towards a more folk rock sound, especially on the tracks including violinist Ed Alleyne-Johnson. Described as the band's "landmark" album, it reached number 20 in the UK charts, the singles "Stupid Questions" and "Vagabonds" making an impression in America, and the band was able to tour the album there with Alleyne-Johnson also providing additional guitar and keyboards. At the end of the year however, Harris left the band, to be replaced by Peter "Nelson" Nice, who would play with the band for more than 20 years. 1990's Impurity continued the folk-driven theme with Alleyne-Johnson still to the fore and Adrian Portas joining the band on guitar.

The next studio album was to be a musical change of direction; as Sullivan later said, "just as this folk-cum-rave-cum-crusty-cum-new-age thing broke and became big in the early 1990s, we went – whoosh – done that – and went and made a very angry hard rock album". The Love of Hopeless Causes, New Model Army's only release on Epic Records, appeared in 1993 and led with the single "Here Comes the War", which spawned controversy when it came packaged with instructions on how to construct a nuclear weapon.

=== Hiatus and return to independence (1994–2000) ===
The band had previously decided to take a year out to concentrate on personal and other musical issues, and reconvened in late 1994 with Dean White, playing keyboards and guitar, replacing Alleyne-Johnson. It became clear that all was not well between Sullivan and Heaton; Sullivan later said, "We wrote Thunder and Consolation and it was brilliant, but very shortly after that, we started falling out, which went on during the making of that album. His life went in one direction and mine went in another". It was agreed that they would go their separate ways after the forthcoming studio album and tour. Strange Brotherhood was released on 13 April 1998 to mixed reviews, but then Heaton was diagnosed with a brain tumour. He suggested that his drum technician Michael Dean take over from him to tour the album. By this time the band had formed their own independent label, Attack Attack, and former tour manager Tommy Tee had returned to manage the band. A live album ...& Nobody Else followed in 1999, and their eighth studio album Eight in 2000.

=== Death of Robert Heaton, and Carnival to Today is a Good Day (2001–2009) ===
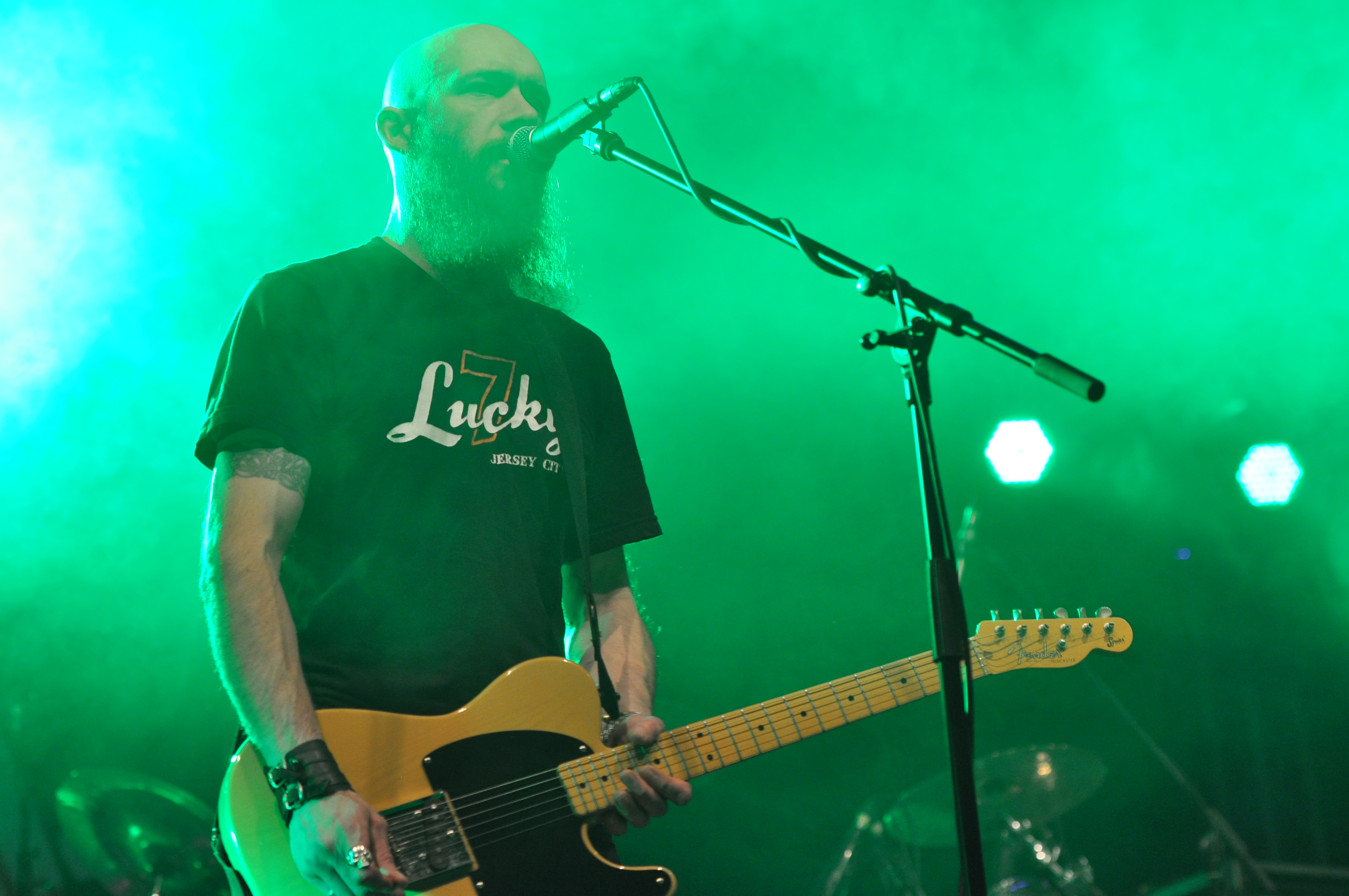
Marshall Gill, guitarist from 2005 to 2021

After touring Eight (2000), the band again took time out, most notably so that Sullivan could concentrate on his debut solo studio album Navigating by the Stars which was eventually released in 2003, and toured by Sullivan, Dean and White. As the band got together to record their ninth studio album, Robert Heaton died from pancreatic cancer on 4 November 2004. Carnival was finally released in September 2005, and includes Sullivan's reaction to Heaton's death, "Fireworks Night". Dave Blomberg was unable to take part in touring the album, and was replaced by guitarist Marshall Gill.

The band's tenth studio album, High, was produced relatively quickly and was released in August 2007. The tour suffered a slight setback when the United States Citizenship and Immigration Services again denied the band visas; this time the issue was relatively quickly resolved and the dates rescheduled for early 2008. Soon afterwards, the band was again shaken as manager Tommy Tee died unexpectedly at the age of 46. By 2009, though, the band were again back in the studio. Today Is a Good Day was a far more uncompromising album, the heavy rock title track and others directly referencing the stock market crash of 2008.

=== 30th anniversary to Winter (2010–2018) ===
New Model Army performing in 2015, left to right: Marshall Gill, Justin Sullivan, Michael Dean, Ceri Monger, Dean White.

Towards the end of 2010, the band's 30th anniversary was celebrated with special shows across four continents every weekend from September until early December; in most cities, the shows were across two nights with completely different sets, the band having promised to play at least four songs from each of their eleven studio albums plus Lost Songs (2002) and B-Sides and Abandoned Tracks (1994), their rarities and B-sides collections. The final shows at the Forum Kentish Town in London were collected on a double CD and DVD release containing all 58 songs played over the nights of 3 and 4 December.

After the band had played their traditional Christmas shows the following year, the news was released that Nelson had decided to leave the band for personal reasons, a decision that had been taken some time before. A few days later, on Christmas Eve, a fire destroyed the band's recording studio and rehearsal space in Bradford. Numerous guitars and other instruments were lost along with recording equipment and memorabilia. However, the studio was back in operation within three months, and after a number of auditions, Ceri Monger was announced as the band's new bassist and multi-instrumentalist.

In 2013, the band's twelfth studio album, Between Dog and Wolf, mixed by Joe Barresi, was released and became the band's most successful since The Love of Hopeless Causes (1993) 20 years earlier. The album showed a marked shift away from the band's traditional sounds, including rhythms that were described as "tribal", though Sullivan claimed they were merely different ways of using drums – "We really like complex tom-tom rhythms, we really like that pounding (beat)". A year later, Between Wine and Blood (2014) was released, including six previously unreleased studio tracks from the Between Dog and Wolf (2013) sessions, along with eleven live tracks from that album. In October 2014, a documentary feature film about the band's career, Between Dog and Wolf: The New Model Army Story by director Matt Reid premiered at the Raindance Film Festival in London and the Festival du nouveau cinéma in Montreal. The band's fourteenth studio album, Winter, was released on 26 August 2016. Winter was named the #1 album of 2016 by The Big Takeover.

=== From Here and 40th anniversary (2019–2023) ===
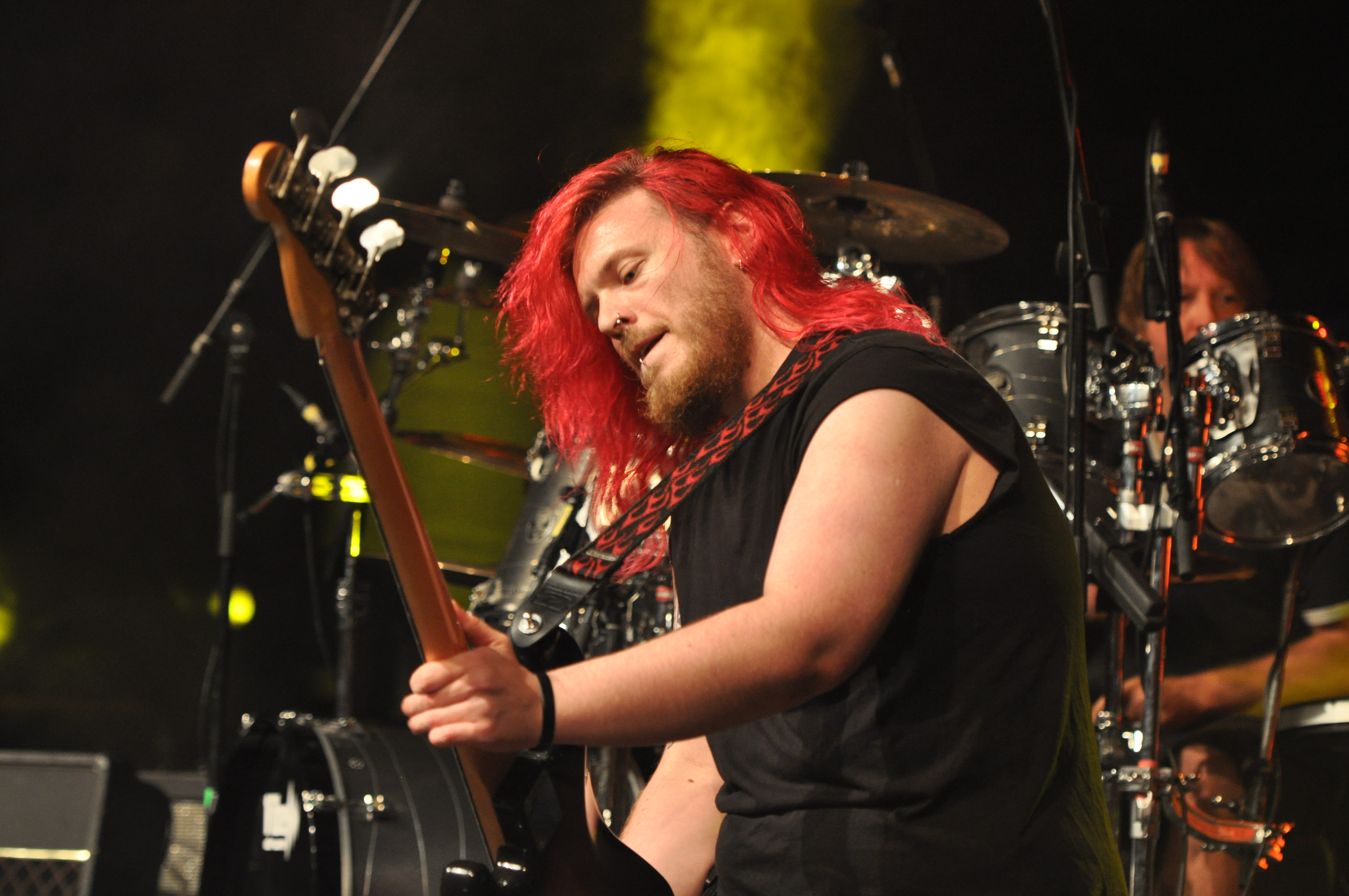
Current bassist Ceri Monger performing live in 2014

On 23 August 2019, the band's fifteenth studio album, From Here, was released. The band had intended to play a number of shows for their 40th anniversary in 2020, but these were cancelled due to the COVID-19 pandemic. They did however play an online show on 23 October to mark the exact 40th anniversary of their first show.

They finally played the 40th anniversary shows towards the end of 2021, although guitarist Marshall Gill was absent for these and the early 2022 shows, the band reverting to a four-piece line-up with Dean White predominantly playing guitar as well as keyboards. On 11 November 2022, Gill indicated in a Facebook post that he had been dropped from the band for refusing a COVID-19 vaccine; at the end of 2021 performers still required proof of vaccination to play in a number of countries that the band were visiting.

=== Unbroken (2023–present) ===
The band released a live album, Sinfonia in September 2023; it was recorded with the Sinfonia Leipzig Orchestra at the Tempodrom venue in Berlin on 15 July 2022. The band's sixteenth studio album, Unbroken, was recorded in 2023 and released on 26 January 2024. The band toured the album in early 2024, with Nguyen Green on keyboards enabling Dean White to play guitar on those songs requiring two instruments. A tour later in the year was postponed until 2025 due to medical issues with drummer Michael Dean. In May 2025, the band played their first tour of Australia, though some shows were curtailed due to poor tickets sales. The Perth show for example, was reduced to a cut down show featuring Sullivan and White instead of the full band.

=== Timeline of major contributors ===
This is a list of musicians who were (or currently have been) a permanent – not touring – member of the band for a significant amount of time.

== "The Family" ==
Over the years, New Model Army have gathered a wide selection of fans, many of whom dedicatedly follow the band. Originally calling themselves "The Militia", after the song "Christian Militia", they later universally adopted the term "The Family" for their multi-generational and gendered group. Joolz Denby, long-time collaborator of Sullivan and the band's main artist has referred to the Family as "not a formal, contrived organisation, but a spontaneous sense of fellowship that has developed over the years", whilst elsewhere it has been described as "sanctuary ... and acceptance".

== Influences ==
Frequently noted for their musical lyricism, Justin Sullivan has noted in interviews that some of the band's (and his own) lyrical inspiration has come from Tom Waits, Bruce Springsteen, Gillian Welch, Joni Mitchell, and Bob Dylan, as well as "lots of country and hip-hop artists, all for their precision and poetry."

== Discography ==
- Vengeance (1984)
- No Rest for the Wicked (1985)
- The Ghost of Cain (1986)
- Thunder and Consolation (1989)
- Impurity (1990)
- The Love of Hopeless Causes (1993)
- Strange Brotherhood (1998)
- Eight (2000)
- Carnival (2005)
- High (2007)
- Today Is a Good Day (2009)
- Between Dog and Wolf (2013)
- Between Wine and Blood (2014)
- Winter (2016)
- From Here (2019)
- Unbroken (2024)
