= Robert Heaton =

- Heaton in 1989

Background information
- Born: Robert Charles Heaton; 6 July 1961; Knutsford, Cheshire, England
- Origin: Bradford, West Yorkshire, England
- Died: 4 November 2004 (aged 43) Bradford, West Yorkshire, England
- Genres: Punk rock; post-punk; folk rock
- Occupations: Drummer; songwriter; musician
- Years active: 1982–2004
- Labels: Abstract; EMI; Epic; Eagle; earMUSIC; Attack Attack
- Formerly of: New Model Army; Hawkwind
- Website: newmodelarmy.org

Robert Charles Heaton (6 July 1961 – 4 November 2004) was an English musician best known as the drummer for the rock band New Model Army. Besides being the drummer for the band Heaton was also responsible for much of the band's songwriting, contributing particularly heavily towards the musical content of the album Thunder and Consolation (1989). He was probably the first person to play a synchronous drum and harmonica solo, doing so in the song "Shot 18" on the No Rest for The Wicked tour.

Although Heaton was the fourth drummer in New Model Army he was the first to tour and record, featuring on all albums from the band's first, Vengeance, released in 1984, until their seventh, Strange Brotherhood, released in 1998, shortly before his departure due to health-related reasons. Heaton also drummed for Hawkwind for a brief period in the 1980s, featuring on The Earth Ritual Preview which was recorded in late 1983 and released in 1984.

== Biography ==
=== Early years ===
Heaton was born in Knutsford, Cheshire, and lived in Canada and Belgium as a child. He was musically gifted, eventually mastering the guitar and harmonica as well as the drums, for which he is better-known, and also played keyboards and fiddle. Heaton began playing guitar and drumming along to his dad's collection of trad jazz recordings. He developed an eclectic musical taste, taking in rock influences like Led Zeppelin and ZZ Top and also the country music of Johnny Cash and classical composers; Beethoven, Mozart, Tchaikovsky and Vivaldi.

=== Hawkwind ===
Heaton worked as a drum technician for Hawkwind from 1981 until 1983. However, following the departure of Ginger Baker in 1981, and with the band's leader Dave Brock's increasing frustration at the inability of several replacements to keep perfect time, Heaton and The Cure's Andy Anderson filled the position for a brief period. Heaton recorded The Earth Ritual Preview EP with the band in 1983, and performed with them at that year's Stonehenge Free Festival, deputising for Anderson. Heaton left Hawkwind in 1983 in order to focus fully on his new project New Model Army whom he had joined in 1982, replacing previous drummer Rob Waddington.

=== New Model Army ===
In 1982 Heaton joined New Model Army who had formed in late 1980 but had yet to find any real success. Heaton's arrival marked the beginning of New Model Army's professional era; the band had previously had a few other drummers, but had released no music during this time. Having spent several years as back-line roadie and tour manager for several other bands, including Hawkwind, he brought professional experience to the band's touring life and was responsible for their hiring of their long-term tour manager 'Tommy T' Walker, a fellow member of the Bradford St George's and Bradford University TSA stage crew. Together with frontman Justin Sullivan, Heaton was the core of the Bradford-based band, originally alongside Stuart Morrow on bass and then later with Jason 'Moose' Harris. Heaton's wide-ranging musical interests are manifested in the music for the anthemic "Green and Grey" as well as co-writing with Sullivan and others the New Model Army singles; ""Brave New World" (Sullivan, Heaton, Harris, Denby), "51st State" (Sullivan, Heaton, Harris, Cartwright), "Poison Street" (Sullivan, Heaton), "White Coats"(Sullivan, Heaton, Harris), "Space" (Sullivan, Heaton, Nelson) and "Here Comes the War" (Sullivan, Heaton, Nelson). He was responsible for many of New Model Army's best-known compositions, which are still played nowadays at their gigs. He left New Model Army in 1998 for health reasons - he had long suffered from sarcoidosis, undergoing repeated surgery, and was then diagnosed with a brain tumour - and was replaced on drums by his roadie Michael Dean. Though the surgery on his brain tumour was successful, he was advised by his surgeons that he would be unlikely to play musical instruments professionally for several years, which ultimately resulted in the end of his career with New Model Army.

=== Work after New Model Army ===
Following his illness Heaton began a successful landscape gardening business and eased himself back into music, He recorded an album's worth of material under the name ‘the Gardeners of Eden' in his Righteous Sound attic recording studio in 1999. The recordings featured various musicians, including original New Model Army bassist Stuart Morrow. Heaton joined forces with Jont Watson and Matt Webster from Bradford band Zed to create a recording studio and record label named Mutiny 2000, set up to record and promote music from the Bradford area. Mutiny 2000 Records released two compilation CDs of Bradford acts and bands, recorded and produced by Heaton and Webster. The first, White Abbey Road, released in November 2000, included two tracks by the Gardeners of Eden; "Motherfucker" and "My Name Is Bill'. The second, Soup Bowl Press - released in 2002, included the Gardeners of Eden track "Bradford 6 am". The Gardeners of Eden played live only once, at the White Abbey Road album launch gig on 4 November 2000 at the Mill venue on Thornton Road, Bradford. The remaining recordings of the Gardeners of Eden remain unreleased. Heaton then became a New Deal adviser and continued to produce and record local bands under the 'Fresh Milk' project, also putting on live events at venues in Bradford and at the Bradford Festival.

=== Death ===
Having faced prolonged health issues including; sarcoidosis which had required several surgeries, and the brain tumour (and successful surgery to remove the tumour) which had forced his departure from New Model Army in 1998, Heaton died from a head injury after a fall down a set of cobblestone stairs while doing landscaping work in a garden. The fall was attributed to a complication relating to both his former brain tumour and newly diagnosed, but severe pancreatic cancer, on 4 November 2004 at the age of 43, leaving a wife Robin and son. Tributes to Heaton came in from all over the world, and he received obituaries in numerous publications including The Independent, The Times and Mojo magazine.

== Albums ==
=== New Model Army ===
Studio albums

- Vengeance (1984)
- No Rest for the Wicked (1985)
- The Ghost of Cain (1986)
- Thunder & Consolation (1989)
- Impurity (1990)
- The Love of Hopeless Causes (1993)
- Strange Brotherhood (1998)

=== Hawkwind ===
- The Earth Ritual Preview (EP)
