= Joolz Denby =

British writer

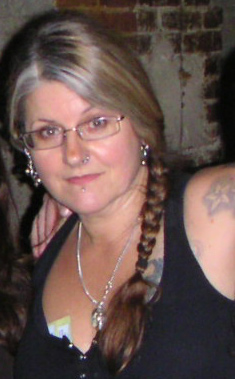
- Denby in Paris, December 2006
- Born: Julianne Mumford; 9 April 1955 (age 71); Colchester
- Other name: Julianne Mumford
- Occupations: Poet; author
- Website: joolzdenby.co.uk

Joolz Denby (born Julianne Mumford, 9 April 1955) is an English poet, novelist, artist and tattooist based in Bradford, West Yorkshire.

== Early life ==
Born to an Army family at Colchester Barracks in Essex, England, Julianne Mumford moved with her parents to Harrogate, North Yorkshire at age 11. While a pupil at Private School Harrogate Ladies' College, she started to hang around with local bikers at age 15, although she was more interested in the mechanical side of motorcycles than becoming a 'biker-chick'.

In 1975, at age 19, she married Kenneth Denby, who wanted to be a "prospect" or probationary member of the Bradford chapter of the Satans Slaves Motorcycle Club. In an interview with the BBC in 2005, she described her time as a Satan's Slave associate thus: "It was very difficult. We didn't have a very good relationship with the police. If anything happened you knew you would immediately get the blame. There were only certain places you could go. We had a lot of power on the streets so I was Little Queen — I just went where I liked and did what I liked because I had a lot of protection. We had a lot of power but you were definitely marked out. Bike culture is very hierarchic and patriarchal so obviously I wasn't in the Satan Slaves. My husband was in the Satan Slaves. I was married to him and that's quite a distinction. As a woman you can't be in those gangs."

Disillusioned with the strict regimentation and controls associated with membership of a biker group and particularly rebellious against those exercised over partners of the male bikers and the expected-conformity which she encountered during four years' association with the Slaves, she dyed her hair pink, broke her ties to the Slaves and later started working as a bouncer during the embryonic punk rock scene of the late 1970s at the Queen's Hall, Bradford.

She then started attending a local poetry-reading group and organised public events for a local group Poetry in Motion. Stepping in for an absent member, she gained her first experience of public speaking.

== Career ==
Denby first came to prominence as a touring punk performance poet. She often performs at musical venues and has been a regular at music festivals such as Roskilde, Reading and at Glastonbury Festival (where she performed in the Theatre and Cabaret Marquees) as well as art and literature festivals in other countries. She began recording music singles and spoken word recordings in 1983.

Denby has published poetry collections and novels. She performs at live venues and appears on television and radio. She has also recorded a number of unabridged audiobooks, including two recordings of her own novels (one of which, Stone Baby, won the US Audio Industry 'Earphone Award'). In 2006 Denby was designated a Cultural Revolutionary by the Northern arts festival 'Illuminate' for her contribution to the region's arts and the cultural life of her home city of Bradford, and received an honorary doctorate from the University of Bradford in recognition of her role as a cultural ambassador.

Denby won the Crime Writers' Association Debut Dagger award for her first novel, Stone Baby. The CWA also nominated the novel for a John Creasey Memorial Dagger prize for best first crime novel. Her third novel, Billie Morgan, based on some of her experiences in the biker subculture of the 1970s, made the shortlist for the 2005 Orange Prize. Denby's fifth collection of poetry Pray for Us Sinners (Comma Press) was published in 2006, and her fourth novel, Borrowed Light (ISBN 1-85242-905-4) was published in February 2006 by Serpent's Tail).

== Works ==
=== Collections of poetry and short stories ===
- Mad, Bad, & Dangerous to Know (Virgin Books, 1986)
- Emotional Terrorism (Bloodaxe Books, 1990)
- The Pride of Lions (Bloodaxe Books, (1994)
- Errors of the Spirit (Flambard Press 2000)
- Pray for Us Sinners (Comma Press, 2005)

=== Novels ===
- Stone Baby, (HarperCollins, 2000)
- Corazon, (HarperCollins, 2001)
- Billie Morgan, (Serpent's Tail, 2004)
- Borrowed Light, (Serpent's Tail, 2006)
- A True Account of the Curious Mystery of Miss Lydia Larkin & The Widow Marvell (Ignite Books 2011)
- Wild Thing (Ignite Books 2012)

=== Discography ===
- Denise (Single), 1983 (#37 UK Indie)
- The Kiss (Single) 1984 (#27 UK Indie)
- Love Is (Sweet Romance) (EP with music by New Model Army) EMI, 1985
- Mad, Bad and Dangerous to Know (EP with music by New Model Army) EMI, 1986
- Hex (music by New Model Army) EMI, 1990
- Weird Sister (music by Justin Sullivan) Intercord Records, 1991
- Joolz 1983–1985 (compilation of Abstract Records material with music by Jah Wobble, Justin Sullivan and other musicians, collecting her first audio recordings) Abstract Records, 1993
- Red Sky Coven, Volumes 1&2 (live collective recording of Red Sky Coven, with Joolz on some of the tracks) Attack Attack Records: 1995
- True North (music by Justin Sullivan) Wooltown Records, 1995 or 1997
- Red Sky Coven, Volume 3 Attack Attack Records: 1999
- Spirit Stories (poetry set to music by Justin Sullivan) Attack Attack Records: 2008
- Red Sky Coven 5 Attack Attack Records: 2009
- The Black Dahlia (poetry set to music by Mik Davis) Attack Attack Records: 2012
- Crow (poetry set to music by Henning Nugel) Attack Attack Records: 2016

=== Audio books ===
- Stone Baby (2000)
- Billie Morgan (2005)
- The Accidental (written by Ali Smith; audio recording by Joolz Denby)

== See also ==
- Punk literature
- New Model Army
