= Martin Newell discography =

- Studio albums: 33
- EPs: 18
- Live albums: 1
- Compilation albums: 19
- Singles: 18
- Video albums: 2
- Box sets: 5

Since 1980 English singer-songwriter Martin Newell has been releasing music as The Cleaners from Venus, The Brotherhood of Lizards, The Stray Trolleys, and also under his own name.

== Studio albums ==
Year	Artist	Title	Label	Additional information
1980	The Stray Trolleys	Barricades and Angels	Self-released	Reissued on CD and vinyl by Captured Tracks in 2017
1981	The Cleaners from Venus	Blow Away Your Troubles	Self-released	
1982	The Cleaners from Venus	On Any Normal Monday	Self-released	
1982	The Cleaners from Venus	Midnight Cleaners	Self-released	Reissued on cassette by Burger in 2011
1983	The Cleaners from Venus	In the Golden Autumn	Self-released	
1984	The Cleaners from Venus	Under Wartime Conditions	Self-released	Reissued on vinyl by Modell in 1985
1985	Martin Newell	Songs for a Fallow Land	Self-released	Some editions alternatively credit this album to the Cleaners from Venus
1986	The Cleaners from Venus	Living with Victoria Grey	Self-released	
1987	The Cleaners from Venus	Going to England	Ammunition Communications	Essentially a high quality re-recording of the previous album Living with Victoria Grey. Also released by RCA in Germany
1988	The Cleaners from Venus	Town & Country	RCA	
1988	The Brotherhood of Lizards	The Brotherhood of Lizards	Acid Tapes	Mini-album
1989	The Brotherhood of Lizards	Lizardland	Deltic	
1990	The Cleaners from Venus	Number Thirteen	Self-released	
1993	Martin Newell	The Greatest Living Englishman	Humbug	Produced by Andy Partridge. Limited edition included a bonus live album of Martin Newell's poetry
1995	Martin Newell	The Off White Album	Humbug	Produced by Louis Philippe
2000	Martin Newell	The Spirit Cage	Cherry Red	Jarmusic released a vinyl edition of the album which included the exclusive bonus single Android Nation
2002	Martin Newell	Radio Autumn Attic	Cherry Red	Includes Martin Newell reading the chapter "Chocks Away" from his memoir This Little Ziggy
2004	Martin Newell	The Light Programme	Cherry Red	
2007	Martin Newell	A Summer Tamarind	Cherry Red	Download edition includes three bonus tracks
2010	The Cleaners from Venus	English Electric	Self-released	Kool Kat Musik limited edition included the bonus album Stopping Train (a compilation of demos and out-takes)
2011	The Cleaners from Venus	In Chimp World	Self-released	Expanded version of the EP of the same name
2013	The Cleaners from Venus	The Late District	Self-released	
2014	The Cleaners from Venus	Return to Bohemia	Self-released	
2015	The Cleaners from Venus	Rose of the Lanes	Self-released	
2016	The Cleaners from Venus	The Last Boy in the Locarno	Self-released	
2018	The Cleaners from Venus	Star Cafe	Self-released	Soundtrack to Martin Newell's D.I.Y. musical
2018	The Cleaners from Venus	Life in a Time Machine	Self-released	
2020	The Cleaners from Venus	Dolly Birds & Spies	Self-released	
2021	The Cleaners from Venus	Penny Novelettes	Self-released	
2022	The Cleaners from Venus	That London	Self-released	
2023	The Cleaners from Venus	K7	Self-released	The album title K7 is a French language abbreviation of cassette
2024	The Cleaners from Venus	Lilli Bolero	The Cat Collects	
2026	The Cleaners from Venus	Beryl & Ruff Go Shopping	The Cat Collects	

== Collaboration albums ==
Year	Artist	Title	Label	Additional information
2015	Martin Newell with The Hosepipe Band	The Song of the Waterlily & Black Shuck	Self-released	Poetry and music
2016	Martin Newell with The Hosepipe Band	The Green Children & Other Poems	Self-released	Poetry and music
2020	Martin Newell with The Hosepipe Band	Jigsaw Coast	Self-released	Live performance at the Headgate Theatre, Colchester - 28 October 2018
2002	The Light Music Company	Housewives' Favourites	Self-released	Collaboration with Rachel Love (née Bor)
2002	The Light Music Company	Christmassy Music	Self-released	Collaboration with Rachel Love

== Live albums ==
Year	Artist	Title	Label
2001	The Cleaners from Venus	Live in Japan (Osaka 1994)	Jarmusic

== Compilation albums ==
Year	Title	Label	Additional information
1982	Secret Dreams of a Kitchen Porter	Self-released	Demos by the Stray Trolleys, plus early recordings by the Cleaners from Venus
1988	Winter	Jarmusic	Tracks from the Cleaners from Venus. Part of the Berlincassette series
1993	Golden Cleaners	Tangerine	"20 Classic Cuts from the Legendary U.K. Pop Combo"
1995	Back from the Cleaners	Tangerine	"Best of the Cleaners from Venus Vol. II"
1999	The Wayward Genius of Martin Newell	Cherry Red	Includes tracks from Martin Newell, the Cleaners from Venus, and the Brotherhood of Lizards
2000	My Back Wages: A Collection of Cleaners Rarities	Jarmusic	Composed primarily of tracks from 1992 which had subsequently been overdubbed by Jarmusic. Upon hearing the compilation Martin Newell was "surprised" by the musical additions made to the album
2004	Living with Victoria Grey: The Very Best of Cleaners from Venus	Cherry Red	Includes Giles Smith reading extracts from his book Lost in Music. Reissued on coloured vinyl by Optic Nerve in 2013
2013	A Dawn Chorus: Early Cleaners and Beyond 1967–1985	Captured Tracks	A compilation of previously unreleased songs from Martin Newell
2014	My Back Wages	Captured Tracks	Martin Newell's approved version of the compilation which contains the original recordings by the Cleaners from Venus
2014	Extra Wages	Captured Tracks	Contains the remaining outtakes from the Cleaners from Venus' 1992 recordings that resulted in My Back Wages, along with a few other rarities
2015	Teatime Assortment	Captured Tracks	A "best of new Newell" taken from the Cleaners from Venus albums English Electric / In Chimp World / The Late District / Return to Bohemia
2016	Lizardland: The Complete Works	Captured Tracks	A Brotherhood of Lizards compilation which includes their self-titled mini-album The Brotherhood of Lizards and the album Lizardland
2016	Cleaned Up Collectibles	Self-released	Early mixes and outtakes from 1986 and 1987 plus live studio demos for the album Town & Country
2017	You've Never Had It So Good: The Best of the Cleaners from Venus	Captured Tracks	Limited edition release in yellow vinyl for Record Store Day 2017
2017	Martin Newell's Jumble Sale	Self-released	A collection of demos and out-takes recorded between 1975 and 2017
2018	Wireless Wivenhoe	Thyme & Mattar	A collection of Martin Newell's comedy sketches and songs written for Radio Wivenhoe
2019	Ginger Stepkids: The Lost Demos 2009/2010	Self-released	A collection of demos and out-takes recorded in 2009 and 2010, the majority of which originally appeared on the English Electric bonus album Stopping Train
2019	Upstairs Planet	Self-released	Soundtrack to the documentary Upstairs Planet: Cleaners from Venus & the Universe of Martin Newell
2022	Cleaned Up Collectibles (Volume 2)	Self-released	"This collection of antiquities and curiosities spans 1979's Flamingo Rd to 2015 The Bachelorette"

== Video albums ==
Year	Artist	Title	Label	Additional information
2018	Martin Newell	Eye Tunes	Self-released	Compiled from Martin Newell's live appearances from 2003-2017
2021	Martin Newell	The Golden Afternoon	Self-released	A recording of Martin Newell's concert at the Colchester Arts Centre on 14 June 2003 directed by Michael Cumming

== EPs ==
Year	Artist	Title	Label	Additional information
1987	The Cleaners from Venus	Mind How You Go!	Jarmusic	
1987	Martin Newell	The April Fool	Jarmusic	Acoustic demos
1995	Martin Newell	Let's Kiosk!	Rhyme / Midi Inc. / Humbug	
2000	Martin Newell & the Cleaners from Venus	New Europeans	Jarmusic	
2002	Martin Newell	Songs from the Station Hotel	Jarmusic	
2009	Martin Newell	A Rogue Shower	Self-released	Rough demos
2009	Martin Newell	E.P. 2	Self-released	
2009	Martin Newell	Piano Fairies	Self-released	Piano demos
2010	Martin Newell	Mule	Self-released	
2011	The Cleaners from Venus	In Chimp World	Self-released	
2013	Martin Newell	Tea with Lady Breakneck	Self-released	Songs from the I Hear Voices Theatre Company production
2017	The Cleaners from Venus	Kitchen Table	Plastic Response	These songs are essentially demos for Martin Newell's musical Star Cafe
2019	The Cleaners from Venus	Could Be Christmas Eve	Self-released	Christmas music
2020	The Cleaners from Venus	July	Self-released	
2020	The Cleaners from Venus	Flowers of December	Self-released	
2021	The Cleaners from Venus	Christabel's Party	Self-released	
2024	The Cleaners from Venus	Winter	Self-released	
2025	The Cleaners from Venus	Neverland for Now	Self-released	

== Singles ==
Year	Artist	Title	Label	Additional information
1980	Martin Newell	Young Jobless	Off Street	Second pressing by Liberty
1983	Martin Newell	Two for the Winter	Self-released	
1985	The Cleaners from Venus	Johnny the Moondog is Dead	Modell	
1987	The Cleaners from Venus	Illya Kuryakin Looked at Me	Ammunition Communications	
1987	The Cleaners from Venus	Living with Victoria Grey	Ammunition Communications	Also released by RCA in Germany
1988	The Cleaners from Venus	Mercury Girl	Ammunition Communications	
1988	The Cleaners from Venus	Let's Get Married	RCA	
1990	The Brotherhood of Lizards	Market Day	Deltic	Split single with Captain Sensible
1993	The Cleaners from Venus	Song for Syd Barrett	Singles Only Label	
2014	The Cleaners from Venus	Glammy Little Christmas	Self-released	Christmas music
2015	The Cleaners from Venus	Cymbaline Way	Self-released	Christmas music
2018	The Cleaners from Venus	Ragged Winter Band	Self-released	Christmas music
2019	The Cleaners from Venus	Time Machine	Self-released	
2019	The Cleaners from Venus	The Essex Princess	Self-released	
2022	The Cleaners from Venus	Lo-Fi London	Self-released	
2023	The Cleaners from Venus	The Beautiful Stoned	Self-released	
2023	The Cleaners from Venus	Christmas 2023	Self-released	Split single with Rachel Love
2025	The Cleaners from Venus	A Rose Called 'Luv' (Xmas Mix)	Self-released	Christmas music

== Box sets ==
Year	Title	Label	Additional information
1996	Martin Newell's Box of Old Humbug	Humbug	Box set containing the albums The Greatest Living Englishman / The Off-White Album and the EP Let's Kiosk!
1996	Please Don't Step on My Rainbow	Jarmusic	Box set of Cleaners from Venus rarities released on five coloured vinyl singles. The limited edition release included a bonus cassette
2012	The Cleaners from Venus Vol. 1	Captured Tracks	Box set containing the albums Blow Away Your Troubles / On Any Normal Monday / Midnight Cleaners
2013	The Cleaners from Venus Vol. 2	Captured Tracks	Box set containing the albums In the Golden Autumn / Under Wartime Conditions / Songs for a Fallow Land / A Dawn Chorus: Early Cleaners and Beyond 1967–1985
2014	The Cleaners from Venus Vol. 3	Captured Tracks	Box set containing the albums Living with Victoria Grey / Number Thirteen / My Back Wages / Extra Wages
