= Live at the Milky Way =

Live album by Captain Sensible
- Released: 1994
- Recorded: 31 October 1993
- Venue: Melkweg, Amsterdam
- Genre: Rock, punk, psychedelia
- Length: 73:54
- Label: Humbug

Captain Sensible chronology
The Universe of Geoffrey Brown (1993)	Live at the Milky Way (1994)	Meathead (1995)

Professional ratings
Review scores
Source	Rating
AllMusic	4.5/5 stars
Encyclopedia of Popular Music	4/5 stars

Live at the Milky Way is a live album by Captain Sensible, released in 1994 by Humbug Records. It was recorded at the Milky Way club in Amsterdam on the final gig of a European tour supporting the album The Universe of Geoffrey Brown. Sensible's backing band, known as the Ugly Sods, features ex-Damned bassist Paul Gray, keyboardist Malcolm Dixon and drummer Garrie Dreadful.

== Critical reception ==
In his review for AllMusic, Bruce Eder wrote that Live at the Milky Way includes "hard grinding, deep crunching, yet richly recorded versions of "Jet Boy Jet Girl," "Neat Neat Neat," "Smash It Up," "Love Song," and "New Rose". He called the sound "both raw and lush", noting that "some of the between-song chatter is as good as the music." In the 5th edition of his Encyclopedia of Popular Music, Colin Larkin wrote that the album managed to capture both Sensible's "humour and considerable songwriting talent", adding that "the band performs as if it is their last day on the planet on rewarding versions of "Neat Neat Neat", "New Rose" and "Happy Talk."

== Track listing ==
No.	Title	Writer(s)	Length
1.	"Interstellar Overcoat"	Captain Sensible, Malcolm Dixon, Paul Gray, Garrie Priest	3:16
2.	"Jet Boy, Jet Girl"	Alan Ward, Lou Deprijck, Yves Lacomblez	3:51
3.	"Smash It Up"	Rat Scabies, Sensible, Dave Vanian, Algy Ward	3:13
4.	"Back to School?"	Sensible	5:34
5.	"Come On Geoffrey Brown"	Sensible	6:57
6.	"Happy Talk"	Richard Rodgers, Oscar Hammerstein	5:16
7.	"The Kamikaze Millionaire"	Ray Burns, Martin Newell	5:32
8.	"Exploding Heads and Teapots (Past Their Prime)"	Burns	4:40
9.	"Love Song"	Scabies, Sensible, Vanian, Ward	2:24
10.	"Neat Neat Neat"	Brian James	7:44
11.	"New Rose"	James	2:57
12.	"Wot"	Sensible	6:50
13.	"Lookin' at You"	Michael Davis, Wayne Kramer, Fred "Sonic" Smith, Dennis Thompson, Rob Tyner	5:30
14.	"Hey Joe"	Billy Roberts	5:33
15.	"Glad It's All Over"	Sensible, Tony Mansfield	4:28

== Personnel ==
Musicians

- Captain Sensible - guitar, vocals
- Paul Gray - bass
- Malcolm Dixon - organ, synthesizer
- Garrie Dreadful - drums

Technical

- Captain Barrington-White - "space whispers", synthesizer programming
- Riny Van Zoolingen - live recording
- Mixed at the Old Pink Dog, Worthing
- Mike Roberts - engineer
