= Revolution Now =

Studio album by Captain Sensible
- Released: July 1989
- Studio: Tin Pan Alley Studios, Konk, Raven, Team Esselle Studios, The Music Station, Nice, ICC Studios, Mark Angelo Studios, Good Earth Studios
- Genre: Pop, rock
- Length: 76:13
- Label: Deltic Records
- Producer: Captain Sensible, Mark Ferda, Team Esselle, The Flowerpot Men

Captain Sensible chronology
The Power of Love (1983)	Revolution Now (1989)	The Universe of Geoffrey Brown (1993)

Singles from Revolution Now
- 1. "Revolution Now" Released: June 1987; 2. "The Toys Take Over" Released: June 1988; 3. "I Get So Excited" Released: October 1988; 4. "Missing the Boat" Released: 1999

Professional ratings
Review scores
Source	Rating
AllMusic	2/5 stars
Encyclopedia of Popular Music	2/5 stars

Revolution Now is the third solo album by Captain Sensible. It was released on CD and double LP in July 1989 on his own Deltic Records. It was Sensible's first album release in six years since 1983's The Power of Love. The album features contributions from Eddy Grant and former the Damned members Rat Scabies, Paul Gray and Henry Badowski, among others.

The album was reissued in 2013 by Easy Action Records in a redesigned gatefold card sleeve.

== Background ==
After leaving his previous record label A&M following the release of his "Revolution Now" single in 1987, Sensible formed his own label, Deltic Records. His first release on the label was the single "Toys Take Over" in June 1988, followed by "I Get So Excited" in October. All three singles were included on Revolution Now, which was recorded in a number of different studios. Sensible wrote in the album's liner notes: "Why so many? Possibly due to the fact that being a bit of a perfectionist I spent a fair amount of time painstakingly putting this album together and would rapidly run out of credit wherever I happened to have the escalating bill that week - requiring frequent, and occasionally speedy relocation."

The album includes the 15 minute epic "Coward of Treason Cove", which consists of a montage of different songs and musical styles. It was co-written with former bandmate Henry Badowski during a visit to Sensible's home in December 1986. Badowski: "He was in the process of putting together a mini rock opera and I was given a bottle of whiskey and a pen and paper and was ordered to write the words to a bunch of tunes he'd written." "Coward of Treason Cove" was originally released as the B-side to the "Revolution Now" 12" single.

== Reception ==
Revolution Now received less favourable reviews upon release and did not chart in the UK. In a review for AllMusic, Richie Unterberger wrote that the album is hard to categorize musically, and that "the result sounds more irritatingly confusing than impressive." He described the music as "'80s British dance rock, neo-psychedelia, and White-boy soul, sometimes in the same song". Unterberger added that "there are some nice bits of melody here and there, but you get the uneasy feeling that eclecticism is being used as a cover for the lack of killer material or a compelling lyrical thread."

In a more positive review, Ira Robbins of Trouser Press wrote that Sensible "reached some sort of artistic peak" on Revolution Now, although it was "hampered a bit by Sensible's minimalist singing and the obvious use of synthesizers where real instruments would have sounded better". He felt that the album was "full of catchy melodies and nearly serious left-field lyrics" and added that "there isn't a bad song here, and the best ones ... cover amazing stylistic ground with ease and flair."

== Track listing ==
No.	Title	Writer(s)	Length
1.	"Missing the Boat"	Ray Burns	4:11
2.	"Smash It Up, Part 4"	Burns	2:36
3.	"Toys Take Over"	Burns, Martin Newell	4:33
4.	"S.2."	Burns	2:56
5.	"Riot on Eastbourne Pier"	Burns	3:08
6.	"Wake Up (You're Only Dreaming)"	Burns	4:07
7.	"Green Light"	Burns, Newell	4:06
8.	"Lib 2/3"	Burns	5:06
9.	"Revolution Now"	Burns, Newell	4:32
10.	"Phone In"	Burns, Newell	3:39
11.	"I Get So Excited"	Eddy Grant, Lincoln Gordon	3:54
12.	"Vosene"	Captain Sensible, Captain Stupid	2:31
13.	"The Kamikaze Millionaire"	Burns, Newell	3:39
14.	"Exploding Heads and Teapots (Past Their Prime)"	Burns	3:54
15.	"The Coward of Treason Cove"	Burns, Henry Badowski	15:21

== Personnel ==
Credits adapted from the album's liner notes.

Musicians

- Captain Sensible - vocals, instruments
- Rachel Bor - vocals ("Missing the Boat", "Toys Take Over")
- Mark Ferda - instruments ("Toys Take Over", "I Get So Excited")
- Belva Haney - vocals ("Green Light", "I Get So Excited")
- Andy Boucher - keyboards ("Missing the Boat", "Wake Up (You're Only Dreaming)", "Green Light")
- Eddy Grant - guitar ("I Get So Excited")
- Rat Scabies - drums ("Riot on Eastbourne Pier")
- Paul Gray - bass ("Riot on Eastbourne Pier")
- Howard Turner - backing vocals ("Riot on Eastbourne Pier")
- The Soultanas - backing vocals ("Revolution Now")
- Captain Stupid - lead vocal ("Vosene")
- Howlin' Wilf - harmonica ("The Kamikaze Millionaire")
- Martin Newell - backing vocals ("The Kamikaze Millionaire")
- Henry Badowski - vocals ("The Coward of Treason Cove")
- Claire Gilligan - vocals ("The Coward of Treason Cove")
- Fred Burns - voice ("The Coward of Treason Cove")

Production

- Captain Sensible - producer
- Mark Ferda - producer ("Toys Take Over", " I Get So Excited")
- Team Esselle - producer ("Missing the Boat", "Green Light")
- The Flowerpot Men - producer ("Revolution Now")
