= Meathead (album) =

Studio album by Captain Sensible
- Released: September 1995
- Genre: Rock, pop
- Length: 2:30:19
- Label: Humbug

Captain Sensible chronology
Live at the Milky Way (1994)	Meathead (1995)	Mad Cows and Englishmen (1996)

Singles from Meathead
- 1. "Fliptop World" Released: 1996

Professional ratings
Review scores
Source	Rating
AllMusic	3/5 stars
The Encyclopedia of Popular Music	3/5 stars
NME	5/10

Meathead is a double album by Captain Sensible, released in September 1995 by Humbug Records. It is Sensible's fifth studio solo album and contains 32 songs across two and a half hours. The album includes studio performances by Sensible's band - featuring ex-Damned bassist Paul Gray, keyboardist Malcolm Dixon and drummer Garrie Dreadful - as well as demo recordings and instrumentals recorded mostly by Sensible on his own.

== Background ==
Sensible writes in the album's liner notes: "If The Universe of Geoffrey Brown was my Sgt. Pepper, then this collection of goodies is probably The White Album.... warts and all!" Meathead was recorded in a "full on experimentation mode", where "nothing was off limits", according to Sensible. He described the album as "a mixed bag of stuff including studio performances by my band, cosmic instrumentals, weird (but genuine) clips from radio and admittedly some dodgy demos that have a certain gnarled charm (ie.... too lazy to re-record)."

"Freedom" and "Pasties" were originally released in 1991 on the 12" and CD-single versions of the Damned's "Fun Factory" single.

== Critical reception ==
In a review for AllMusic, Richie Unterberger called Meathead "a sprawling mess of a record", saying that Sensible "seems to be taking a Zappa-like approach to his work with his combination of so many elements: bouncy London pop, Pink Floydish spacy electronics, found sound bites from TV shows, grating bulldozer guitar riffs, dainty orchestral violins, and silly lyrics about space travel. Often he seems to want to shock or jolt the listener out of complacency with repeated monster guitar licks or spoken dialogue; if the goal is to irritate, he succeeds all too well ... The listener ends up being not so much dazzled as exhausted, or worse, fed up with his apparent value of cocky experimentation over cogent, humane statements."

== Track listing ==
All tracks are written by Captain Sensible, except where noted.

Disc one
No.	Title	Writer(s)	Length
1.	"Sally Blue Shoes"		6:51
2.	"Rough Justice"		5:26
3.	"Bare Arm Situations"		3:05
4.	"The Love Policeman"		5:07
5.	"Crazy Fish"	Malcolm Dixon	4:40
6.	"Elephant Dung"		1:50
7.	"Hammond Solo"		5:53
8.	"Zarbo Nebula - Part 1"		5:23
9.	"Zarbo Nebula - Part 2"		4:47
10.	"Zarbo Nebula - Part 3"		2:52
11.	"Zarbo Nebula - Part 4"		5:02
12.	"Freedom"		2:26
13.	"Eric Clapton's Wallet"		2:01
14.	"Pasties"		2:02
15.	"Love Thing"	Dixon	4:52
16.	"Bruce Forsythe"		8:00
17.	"Flip Top World"		5:21
18.	"Pompous Overture"	Dixon	2:42
Total length:			78:31

Disc two
No.	Title	Writer(s)	Length
1.	"Aliens of the World"		3:01
2.	"Space Shuttle"		5:32
3.	"A Brief Hiccup"		1:01
4.	"Meathead"		6:21
5.	"Honeymoon in Acapulco"		6:34
6.	"Can You Hear Me"		4:00
7.	"The Snow Queen (Excerpt)"	Eric Woods	2:46
8.	"Business Trip to Saturn"		15:58
9.	"Inventing the Wheel"	Dixon	5:09
10.	"The Last Train"		3:46
11.	"Festival Radio Jingles"		0:33
12.	"Aliens ? We Are the Aliens"	Dixon, Charlie Foster	4:08
13.	"Stabilizer Jam"	Dixon	4:54
14.	"Plastic Arcade"	Sensible, Martin Newell	8:16
Total length:			72:09

== Personnel ==
Credits adapted from the album's liner notes.

Musicians

- Captain Sensible - vocals, guitar, keyboards
- Malcolm Dixon - keyboards, guitar, vocals, lead vocals ("Crazy Fish", "Love Thing", "Inventing the Wheel", "Aliens ? We Are the Aliens", "Stabilizer Jam")
- Paul Gray - bass
- Garrie Dreadful - drums

Additional musicians

- Howlin' Wilf - harmonica ("Freedom")
- M.M. McGhee - drums ("Business Trip to Saturn")
- Niall Hone - bass ("Business Trip to Saturn")
- Martin Newell - guitar ("Business Trip to Saturn")
- Graham - samples, programming ("Business Trip to Saturn")
- Andrew Bor - piano ("Zarbo Nebula")
- Rachel Bor - cello ("Plastic Arcade"), vocals ("The Last Train")
- Eric Woods - performer, arrangement ("The Snow Queen (Excerpt)")
