= The Power of Love (Captain Sensible album) =

Studio album by Captain Sensible
- Released: 25 November 1983
- Studio: Ridge Farm Studio, Sussex, England
- Genre: Pop
- Length: 45:19
- Label: A&M
- Producer: Tony Mansfield

Captain Sensible chronology
Women and Captains First (1982)	The Power of Love (1983)	Revolution Now (1989)

Singles from The Power of Love
- 1. "Stop the World" Released: July 1983; 2. "I'm a Spider" Released: November 1983; 3. "Glad It's All Over" Released: March 1984

Alternative cover
- 2009 Cherry Red reissue

The Power of Love is the second solo album by The Damned guitarist Captain Sensible, released in November 1983 by A&M Records. The album didn't chart but the single "Glad It's All Over" reached number 6 on the UK Singles Chart. The album features contributions from producer Tony Mansfield, Robyn Hitchcock, Ruts drummer Dave Ruffy and the band Dolly Mixture, among others.

The Power of Love was reissued on CD in 2009 by Cherry Red Records, including seven bonus tracks. For the reissue the track listing was re-sequenced, as Captain Sensible was never happy with the original running order.

== Background ==
As on his first solo album, Women and Captains First, Sensible had enlisted ex-Soft Boy Robyn Hitchcock to help with the songwriting on The Power of Love. "He was writing some spectacular lyrics for my tunes", Sensible explained. According to Hitchcock, "[Sensible] had a lot of backing tracks and he just gave me some cassettes and then I went away and wrote some words."

The anti-war song "Glad It's All Over" was Sensible's pointed comment on the Falklands War. He described the song as "a result of my highly tuned pop sensibilities and the aural sculpting genius of producer Tony Mansfield... who actually plays the drum parts live himself on (not sampled!) a Duckhams oil can (floor tom), a casserole dish lid (high hat) and a Rowntrees choc tin (snare drum). After a bit of 'tuning' with a panel hammer the kit sounded just right and we rolled the tape with the result transforming the song into something rather special."

On the album's title, Sensible said: "With the Falklands war [in 1982] and the mass build up of nuclear missiles in my mind I thought the planet could do with a bit more love and a bit less unpleasantness. So me and my neighbour Bob wrote a song called "The Power of Love" which also ended up as the album title." Album track "Thanks for the Night" would be rerecorded by The Damned and released as a single in 1984.

== Critical reception ==
Professional ratings
Review scores
Source	Rating
AllMusic	3/5 stars
Classic Rock	7/10 stars
The Encyclopedia of Popular Music	2/5 stars
Vive Le Rock	5/5 stars

In a retrospective review for AllMusic, Mark Deming wrote that on The Power of Love, the playful side that made many of the songs on Sensible's first solo album so appealing, "fell by the wayside, and instead the album was a straightforward and overly slick exercise in electro-processed pop ... with Tony Mansfield's production so slick and clean you could fry an egg on it." Deming felt that "Royal Rave Up" is the only song on the album that shows the funny side of Sensible and that "while a few of the songs are quite good ... the most effective bit of whimsy comes from a cover of the Pink Floyd rarity "It Would Be So Nice". Deming concluded that "while dance beats dominate a number of these tracks, the cumulative effect falls somewhere between languid and simply lazy", adding that The Power of Love robs Sensible's music of "much of its charm and personality".

== Track listing ==
Side one
No.	Title	Writer(s)	Length
1.	"I'm a Spider"	Captain Sensible, Tony Mansfield, Robyn Hitchcock	4:11
2.	"I Love Her"	Paul Ryan, Barry Ryan	2:36
3.	"Stop the World"	Sensible, Mansfield, Hitchcock	4:33
4.	"Sir Donald's Son"	Sensible	2:56
5.	"It's Hard to Believe I'm Not"	Sensible, Hitchcock	3:08
6.	"Thanks for the Night"	Sensible	4:07

Side two
No.	Title	Writer(s)	Length
7.	"Glad It's All Over"	Sensible, Mansfield	4:06
8.	"Royal Rave Up"	Sensible	5:06
9.	"Secrets"	Sensible, Hitchcock	4:32
10.	"It Would Be So Nice"	Richard Wright	3:39
11.	"The Power of Love"	Bob Jones	3:54
12.	"I Love You"	Sensible	2:31

2009 reissue
No.	Title	Writer(s)	Length
1.	"Glad It's All Over"	Sensible, Mansfield	4:06
2.	"It's Hard to Believe I'm Not"	Sensible, Hitchcock	3:10
3.	"It Would Be So NIce"	Wright	3:42
4.	"Sir Donald's Son"	Sensible	2:58
5.	"Stop the World"	Sensible, Mansfield, Hitchcock	4:35
6.	"Thanks for the Night"	Sensible	4:12
7.	"Royal Rave Up"	Sensible	5:09
8.	"I'm a Spider"	Sensible, Mansfield, Hitchcock	4:13
9.	"Secrets"	Sensible, Hitchcock	4:33
10.	"I Love Her"	Ryan, Ryan	2:39
11.	"The Power of Love"	Jones	3:54
12.	"I Love You"	Sensible	2:32

Bonus tracks
No.	Title	Writer(s)	Length
13.	"Back To School?" (B-side of "Stop the World", 1983)	Sensible	7:56
14.	"Women Sago" (B-side of "I'm a Spider", 1983)	Sensible	3:51
15.	"There Are More Snakes Than Ladders" (Non-album single, 1984)	Sensible, Mansfield	3:38
16.	"One Christmas Catalogue" (Non-album single, 1984)	Sensible, Mansfield	3:59
17.	"Come On Down" (Non-album single, 1985)	Sensible, Peter Bardens	3:50
18.	"Beggars Can Be Choosers" (B-side of "Come On Down")	Sensible	2:55
19.	"Revolution Now" (Non-album single, 1987)	Sensible, Martin Newell	4:21

== Personnel ==
Credits adapted from the album's liner notes.

Musicians

- Captain Sensible - vocals, assorted instruments
- Tony Mansfield - Fairlight CMI, guitars, tin cans
- Robyn Hitchcock - guitar on "I'm a Spider" and "It's Hard to Believe I'm Not", backing vocals on "I'm a Spider", "It's Hard to Believe I'm Not" and "Royal Rave Up"
- Dolly Mixture - vocals on "Stop the World" and "The Power of Love"
- John Reid - bass on "I'm a Spider" and "Royal Rave Up"
- Dave Ruffy - drums on "It's Hard To Believe I'm Not"
- Steve Roberts - drums on "Sir Donald's Son"
- Phil Towner - drums on "It Would Be So Nice"
- Martin Ansell - backing vocals on "Glad It's All Over" and "It Would Be So Nice"
- Kevin Weatherill - backing vocals on "Glad It's All Over" and "It Would Be So Nice"
- Karin Padgham - backing vocals on "Glad It's All Over"
- Paul Cemmick - backing vocals on "Glad It's All Over"
- Anousha - backing vocals on "Glad It's All Over"

Production

- Tony Mansfield - producer
- Jules Bowen - engineer

Bonus tracks

- Matthew Fisher - piano on "Back to School?"
- Dave Ruffy - drums on "Back to School?"
- Captain Sensible - producer on "Back to School?" and "Beggars Can Be Choosers"
- Peter Bardens - producer on "Come On Down"
- John Hudson - mixing on "Come On Down"
- The Flowerpot Men - producer on "Revolution Now"
