= Mad Cows and Englishmen =

1996 album by Captain Sensible

Studio album by Captain Sensible
- Released: 1996
- Studio: Hatch Farm Studios, Addlestone, Surrey
- Genre: Rock, pop
- Length: 55:44
- Label: Scratch
- Producer: Nick Smith

Captain Sensible chronology
Meathead (1995)	Mad Cows and Englishmen (1996)

Singles from Mad Cows and Englishmen
- 1. "While Wrecking the Car" Released: June 1997; 2. "Cigarette Sandy" Released: November 1998

Professional ratings
Review scores
Source	Rating
Encyclopedia of Popular Music	3/5 stars

Mad Cows and Englishmen is the sixth and last studio solo album by Captain Sensible, released in 1996 by Scratch Records.

== Critical reception ==
In his review of the album on the music website Brainwashed, Mark Weddle wrote: "Captain's psychedelic tinged power pop cranks up the guitar and carries on where the Damned left off in the early 80's around the time of Strawberries." Weddle called the songs "well written and executed", stating "Of Sensible's half dozen or so solo albums to date, this one is his best".

== Reissues ==
Mad Cows and Englishmen was reissued through Empty Records in 1997 and The Store For Music in 2001, adding live recordings of "Wot" and "Happy Talk" as bonus tracks. The hidden track, "Cigarette Sandy", was not included on the reissues. In 1998, Eagle Records reissued the album as The Masters, including "Cigarette Sandy" and the two bonus tracks.

== Track listing ==
All tracks are written by Captain Sensible, except where noted

No.	Title	Writer(s)	Length
1.	"While Wrecking the Car"		4:18
2.	"Bob's Brown Nose"		5:38
3.	"Neverland"		3:21
4.	"The Stately Homes of England"		3:23
5.	"Smashing the Chains"		2:46
6.	"Mr. Brown's Exploding Wallet"		5:10
7.	"Monty's Revenge"	Monty Oxymoron	7:37
8.	"Mr. Farmer"		5:36
9.	"The Lottery Love Rat"		5:37
10.	"One Hit Wonder"		4:16
11.	"The World of Matilda Free" (includes the hidden track "Cigarette Sandy")	Sensible, Garrie Dreadful ("Cigarette Sandy")	8:05
Total length:			55:44

1997 bonus track
No.	Title	Length
12.	"Wot" (Live)	8:31

2001 bonus tracks
No.	Title	Writer(s)	Length
12.	"Happy Talk" (Live)	Richard Rodgers, Oscar Hammerstein II	4:26
13.	"Wot" (Live)		10:03

Notes

- At 6:25 of track 11 there is 20 seconds of silence before the beginning of "Cigarette Sandy", a song which is shown as track 12 on the lyric sheet but not listed on the album sleeve.
- "Cigarette Sandy" is not included on the 1997 and 2001 reissues of Mad Cows and Englishmen.
- "Neverland" was rerecorded by the Damned in 2001 on Grave Disorder.

== The Masters (1998 reissue) ==
All tracks are written by Captain Sensible, except where noted

No.	Title	Writer(s)	Length
1.	"While Wrecking the Car"		4:18
2.	"Bob's Brown Nose"		5:38
3.	"Neverland"		3:21
4.	"The Stately Homes of England"		3:23
5.	"Smashing the Chains"		2:49
6.	"Mr. Brown's Exploding Wallet"		5:08
7.	"Monty's Revenge"	Monty Oxymoron	7:37
8.	"Mr. Farmer"		5:35
9.	"The Lottery Love Rat"		5:37
10.	"One Hit Wonder"		4:17
11.	"The World of Matilda Free"		6:26
12.	"Cigarette Sandy"	Sensible, Garrie Dreadful	1:19
13.	"Happy Talk" (Live)	Richard Rodgers, Oscar Hammerstein II	4:17
14.	"Wot 1" (Live)		8:27
Total length:			68:12

== Personnel ==
Credits adapted from the album's liner notes.

Musicians

- Captain Sensible - vocals, guitar
- Monty Oxymoron - organ, synthesizer; drums ("Monty's Revenge")
- Sir Dangerous Dave - bass
- Garrie Dreadful - drums

Additional musicians

- Jennie Cruse - vocals
- Rachel Bor - vocals
- Sarah Mölz - additional vocals ("Monty's Revenge")

Technical

- Nick Smith - producer, engineer
- John Boy - live sound recording
- Brian Adams - executive producer
- Georgie Best - artwork
- pre-production at Schweine Sound Studios, Lucerne
