= The Universe of Geoffrey Brown =

Studio album by Captain Sensible
- Released: April 1993
- Studio: Ezee Studios, London
- Genre: Pop, rock
- Length: 51:07
- Label: Humbug
- Producer: Captain Sensible

Captain Sensible chronology
Revolution Now (1989)	The Universe of Geoffrey Brown (1993)	Live at the Milky Way (1994)

Singles from The Universe of Geoffrey Brown
- 1. "Holiday in My Heart" Released: 1993

Professional ratings
Review scores
Source	Rating
AllMusic	4/5 stars
Encyclopedia of Popular Music	2/5 stars

The Universe of Geoffrey Brown is the fourth solo album and first concept album by Captain Sensible, released in April 1993 by Humbug Records.

== Background ==
Captain Sensible had grown up musically in the 1960s and 1970s, where "some incredible records were being made", he said in 2014. "The first time I heard The Pretty Things’ S.F. Sorrow, I was transfixed. The concept nature of the album took me on a musical journey…a mind trip, even. It was hugely engrossing, and I started seeking out other records of this kind – like The Moody Blues‘ Days of Future Passed and Tommy. "One day I will make an album like this," I promised myself. And that’s how Geoffrey Brown came about."

The album tells the story of Geoffrey Brown, whose quiet corporate life is turned upside down when aliens start leaving warning messages on his computer screen about mankind's self-inflicted demise. He is abandoned as a crackpot by his wife, co-workers and friends only for the government to recognize his value in the end. Sensible: "My main character Geoffrey works at the Ministry of Defence, plotting targets for destruction in a nuclear attack. He considers his job normal until his head is turned by a hippie chick one day on a bicycle ride; he decides to do something more creative with his department’s missile tracking technology."

Captain Sensible came up with the original concept which was condensed into the title track by co-writer Martin Newell. "Originally, it was only one song", Newell explained in 2011. "And then Captain being Captain, said, "Do you think we can make a whole album?" And I said, "We’ve already said it all in one song!" So then we had to pad it out. And then Captain said, "We need some dialogue." Newell brought the characters to life with some "excellent scripts", according to Sensible, "and we got proper actors to perform the between-song dialogue." or Sensible took his inspiration from what he calls "the Cold War rhetoric of Reagan and Thatcher." Sensible: "The question the album asks is, "How did we go from the beautiful love and peace dream of the summer of ’67 to public acceptance of the Dr. Strangelove world of mutually assured nuclear annihilation?" The opening line about aliens being alien that introduces the first track is spoken by real life UFO investigator Jenny Randles.

In his book The Damned - The Chaos Years: An Unofficial Biography, writer Barry Hutchinson describes the music as a "bright, happy collection of English pop, with some leanings to rock and psychedelia in places."

== Critical reception ==
In a review for AllMusic, Jack Rabid wrote that all of Sensible's "usual goofy, nostalgic neo-psychedelic guitar tricks and surprisingly crafted pop tunes are in place", adding that "such glitzy tunes as "Holiday in My Heart," "Street of Shame," and the title track claw their way into your affections in a few plays." Rabid felt that the album combines two common Sensible themes: "our own self-destructive impulses and the ostracizing of folks who go against accepted practices and actually dare to use their own brains". He concluded that the album is "another ambitious yet modest gem from a true personality original."

== Track listing ==
All tracks are written by Captain Sensible, except where noted

No.	Title	Writer(s)	Length
1.	"Holiday in My Heart"	Sensible, Martin Newell	6:51
2.	"Come On Geoffrey Brown"		7:19
3.	"Getting To Me"		3:48
4.	"Street of Shame"	Sensible, Newell	3:56
5.	"Geoff Loosens His Tie"		5:47
6.	"Home"		4:16
7.	"Govt. Dirty Tricks Dept. WC1"		1:48
8.	"Life Up in the Stars"		5:48
9.	"The Message"		3:20
10.	"A Trip to Cornwall"		3:22
11.	"The Universe of Geoffrey Brown"	Sensible, Newell	4:52

== Personnel ==
Credits adapted from the album's liner notes.

- Captain Sensible - vocals, instruments
- Martin Newell - drama sequence script, backing vocals (4, 11)
- Mel Galley - lead guitar (1)
- Nigel Haslem - keyboards (4)
- Martin Wilson - drums (4), gong (11)
- Rachel Bor - cello (1), backing vocals (6, 8)
- Simon The Bald Breakfast Chef - percussion (3)
- Paul Bevoir - backing vocals (1)
- Lis Aitken - backing vocals (2)
- Fi Potsides - backing vocals (2)
- Ezee Studios staff - chorus vocals (2)
- Wee Dave Shaw - backing vocals (4, 11)
- Pisshead Pam - sexy voice (11)
- Binky Baker - Geoffrey Brown
- Judy Buxton - other parts
- James Kerry - other parts

Production

- Captain Sensible - producer, arrangement
- Andy Lovell - engineer
- Rose Petalmetal - vocal tracking (2)
- John Harris - engineer (Old Pink Dog Studios)
- Nik Smith - engineer (Old Pink Dog Studios)
- Andy Reilly - MIDI programming
- Sid Wells - digital editing, mastering
- Sam Steiger - sleeve design
- Shane McCarthy - photography
- All speech recorded at Old Pink Dog Studios, Sussex
