= Shillelagh Sisters =

British female music group

- Shillelagh Sisters, 1984

Background information
- Origin: United Kingdom
- Genres: Rockabilly, new wave
- Years active: 1983–2002, 2019–present
- Labels: CBS, NV, AlmaFame
- Past members: Jacquie O'Sullivan; Lynder Halpin (Lyn Boorer); Patricia "Trisha" O'Flynn; Maria "Mitzi" Ryan

The Shillelagh Sisters were a British female group composed of Jacquie O'Sullivan (vocals), Lynder Halpin (double bass), Patricia "Trisha" O'Flynn (saxophone) and Maria "Mitzi" Ryan (drums). Their music style was a mixture of rockabilly and punk rock, influenced by Halpin and O'Sullivan's boyfriends, who were, respectively, Boz Boorer (guitarist) and Phil Bloomberg (bassist), both of the rockabilly group The Polecats.

== History ==
=== Early years ===
The group was founded in early 1983 in a men's restroom at a party. The group had little experience playing instruments, but learned as they went along. Initially the group had two other members, Helen Shadow and Amice Boyde, both of whom played guitar.

With this line-up, they toured, playing at London clubs and appearing as the supporting act for the likes of the Pogues (then named Pogue Mahone) and Bad Manners, mostly playing covers of rockabilly tunes. However, they soon lost both female guitarists, and Boz Boorer took over playing the guitar for their shows. Phil Bloomberg managed the group.

After gaining a substantial club following and some press coverage, they signed a record deal with CBS Records, a move which Halpin later regretted:

"It was not particularly what I wanted to because I can't stand majors. I would have gone for an independent like Rough Trade and keep more control over what we were gonna do. The records we did with CBS were not really what I would have wanted them to have been."

Tensions arose when recording the first single, "Give Me My Freedom", a cover of little-known female soul group The Glories, who released their version in 1967. O'Sullivan called it "an old Northern soul song". CBS felt the final result was not commercial enough and so it was re-done with a different producer, losing, Halpin later commented, the band's original sound in the process. In addition, CBS refused to allow Boz Boorer to be a full band member, not letting him appear on the single cover or in interviews or video clips.

Despite all these problems, "Give Me My Freedom" was released in April 1984. The group had some press coverage and also did some television shows (most notably The Tube) and a John Peel session at BBC Radio One. The Shillelagh Sisters also went on tour as the supporting act for British rock band Spear of Destiny. However, all this promotion did not lead to pop success and their single charted poorly at No. 100 in the UK Singles Chart in May 1984.

Soon after, CBS released their second single, the Latin-flavoured "Passion Fruit", with a cover of Nancy Sinatra's "These Boots Are Made for Walkin'" as the B-side. The record was remixed by pop mogul Pete Waterman. It failed to gain any interest and did not make the UK chart. The song, according to O'Sullivan, was the very first song she ever wrote.

The band's dissatisfaction with the way CBS was marketing them, along with differences between the band members, led to the band's demise in late 1984.

In 1988, O'Sullivan was asked in Smash Hits magazine whether they made any good records and she replied: "Um... as far as I'm concerned they weren't very good..."

=== 1986–1992 ===
In 1986, O'Sullivan and Halpin created another group called Max Attraction. It was composed of O'Sullivan, Halpin, Boorer, Phil Bloomberg, Neil Rooney, John Buck, Hilary C. Book, and Shirley. They toured with Gary Glitter and Captain Sensible and did some demos, but nothing got released and the group parted ways a year later.

In 1986, Trisha O'Flynn became part of the female group Coming Up Roses (created by two ex-members of cult band Dolly Mixture), playing the saxophone, but it did not last long and she, alongside Leigh Luscious (guitar) and Claire Kenny (bass), left the band. The band did not release any records while she was part of it.

In 1988, O'Sullivan joined girl group Bananarama, where she enjoyed several UK top 40 hits (including two top 5 hits). After promoting a greatest hits album and releasing a studio album, she left the group for good in late 1991. She then formed the group Slippry Feet with friend Paul Simper.

Lynder Halpin married Boz Boorer and played in some indie bands.

=== Tyrannical Mex ===
In 1993, O'Sullivan, Halpin and Boorer got together again as the Shillelagh Sisters for a Japanese tour. They recorded an album in one day, titled Tyrannical Mex, prior to the tour, and then went to Japan with drummer Woodie Taylor. The tour was a success. The band performed once more in 1998 for a one-off as part of an Irish festival.

=== Sham'Rock & Roll ===
In 2001, O'Sullivan signed a three album deal with AlmaFame Records. She released a Slippery Feet album, Freak Time Viewing in late 2001, and in 2002 a Shillelagh Sisters album, titled Sham'Rock & Roll which included some of the band's demos. "Give Me My Freedom" and "Shout", from their CBS days, were also included in the album's demo forms. It also featured two demos from Max Attraction.

Around this time, an official website, shillelaghsisters.com, featuring a discography and an interview with Lynder, was assembled.

A third album from O'Sullivan, tentatively titled The Jacquie O Collection, featuring new songs and re-recordings of her hits with Bananarama, was announced but the label folded and nothing was released.

== Discography ==
=== Albums ===
- 1993 Tyrannical Mex
- 2002 Sham'Rock & Roll

=== Singles ===
- 1984 "Give Me My Freedom" (released in April); B-side: "Teasin' Cheatin' Man" – UK No. 100
- 1984 "Passion Fruit"; B-side: "These Boots Are Made for Walkin'" UK No.163
