= Sham'Rock & Roll =

Sham'Rock and Roll

Studio album by Shillelagh Sisters
- Released: 2002
- Genres: Rockabilly; punk
- Label: AlmaFame
- Producers: Phil Bloomberg; Shillelagh Sisters

Shillelagh Sisters chronology
Tyrannical Mex (1993)	Sham'Rock and Roll (2002)

Sham'Rock & Roll is an album released by the rockabilly punk group Shillelagh Sisters. It was released in 2002.

In 2002 AlmaFame records released the album, made up of some of the band's demos, live performances and tracks from the Tyrannical Mex album. "Give Me My Freedom" and "Shout", from their CBS days, were also included in the album's demo recordings. The album also featured two demos from Max Attraction.

== Track listing ==
1. "Give Me My Freedom" (original demo version)
2. "Shout" (original demo version)
3. "Gotta Know"
4. "When I see You Out" (live circa 83)
5. "Hoy Hoy" (live circa 83)
6. "Fool I Am"
7. "Rockin' Lady"
8. "Romp & Stomp"
9. "Black Cadillac"
10. "These Boots Are Made For Walkin'
11. "Maximum Emotion" (performed by Max Attraction)
12. "Whatcha Doin' Now?" (performed by Max Attraction)

== Credits ==
- Phil Bloomberg - producer (1, 2, 4, 5, 11, 12)
- Shillelagh Sisters - producer (3, 6–10)

== Release history ==
Year	Format	Label	Reference	Country
2002	CD album	Almafame	ALMACD20	UK
