= Women and Captains First =

Studio album by Captain Sensible
- Released: 3 September 1982
- Recorded: Spring 1982
- Studio: Old Barn Studios, Kenley, UK
- Genre: Pop
- Length: 45:20
- Label: A&M
- Producer: Tony Mansfield

Captain Sensible chronology
This is Your Captain Speaking (EP) (1981)	Women and Captains First (1982)	The Power of Love (1983)

Singles from Women and Captains First
- 1. "Happy Talk" Released: June 1982; 2. "Wot" Released: August 1982; 3. "Croydon" Released: October 1982

Women and Captains First is the debut solo album by the English musician Captain Sensible, best known as guitarist for The Damned, released on 3 September 1982 by A&M Records. It features contributions from producer Tony Mansfield, Robyn Hitchcock and the band Dolly Mixture. The album was preceded by the singles "Happy Talk" and "Wot", which peaked at numbers 1 and 26 on the UK Singles Chart, respectively. The album reached No. 64 on the UK Albums Chart. It was reissued on CD in 2009 by Cherry Red Records, including six bonus tracks.

== Background ==
Women and Captains First was recorded while Captain Sensible was still a member of punk rock band The Damned. He had released his debut solo record, the three song EP This is Your Captain Speaking, in November 1981 on Crass Records. The producer of Women and Captains First, Tony Mansfield of synth-pop band New Musik, had previously produced The Damned's Friday 13th EP, also released in November 1981. Sensible recorded demos of four of his songs with Mansfield, who then gave them to his manager who took them to A&M Records. Sensible: “I got a solo deal with A&M on the strength of a few tunes The Damned had rejected for being too melodic.” For Sensible, Women and Captains First was a musical departure from The Damned's blend of punk, rock and psychedelic rock influences. Sensible: "Mansfield wasn't into the psychedelic guitar thing. He was into pop. I wanted his '80s synth pop production on my records."

The last song recorded for the album was a cover version of “Happy Talk” from the 1949 Rodgers and Hammerstein musical South Pacific. Sensible: “Needing one song to complete an album, producer Tony Mansfield told me to rummage through my records to find something worthy of a cover version." Sensible was instructed to find "something we could do something a bit weird with" and ended up choosing “Happy Talk” from his parents’ record collection. When A&M heard the finished recording they "smelled a hit", according to Sensible. Initially, he wouldn't let them release it as a single. "Well, until they lied that a well-known artist from a big label was doing their own version and I'd lose my guaranteed number 1. So I said yes." Released as the album's first single in June 1982, “Happy Talk” topped the UK Singles Chart for two weeks in July. The success of the single launched Sensible's solo career, and he quickly found himself in constant demand for TV appearances, radio and magazines. "One minute I was living at home with my mum and dad, and in a punk group and being the disgrace of the neighbourhood, and the next minute everyone thought I was this wonderful novelty song artist, and it was lunacy."

Second single "Wot" was a Top 10 hit in several European countries and a Top 30 hit in the UK, US and Australia. The album's third single, "Croydon", failed to chart.

== Critical reception ==
Professional ratings
Review scores
Source	Rating
AllMusic	3.5/5 stars
Classic Rock	8/10 stars
Vive Le Rock	5/5 stars
Encyclopedia of Popular Music	3/5 stars

In a retrospective review for AllMusic, Mark Deming wrote: "Part of the idea behind the album was to show he could do more than just straightforward punk rock, and there's no arguing he succeeded." Deming felt that the "proto-rap" of "Wot" and the "domestic squalor" of "A Nice Cup of Tea" are "comic", but they are also "well-crafted pop tunes that deliver the goods". "Croydon" and "Brenda Parts 1 & 2," are described as "smart and atmospheric with a faint psychedelic edge", and "Croydon" also reveals a "subtle but clear John Lennon influence". The traditional jazz arrangement of "Nobody's Sweetheart", according to Deming, is "an effective bit of retro fun". In his conclusion, Deming wrote that most of Women and Captains First is dominated by "synthesizers, drum machines, and breathy female backing vocals", giving the album "a slick and instantly recognizable '80s sound" that hasn't dated well.

== Track listing ==
Side one
No.	Title	Writer(s)	Length
1.	"Wot"	Captain Sensible	3:40
2.	"A Nice Cup of Tea"	Sensible	3:12
3.	"Brenda Part 1"	Sensible, Robyn Hitchcock
4.	"Brenda Part 2"	Sensible, Hitchcock	7:27
5.	"Yanks with Guns"	Sensible	4:30
6.	"Happy Talk"	Richard Rodgers, Oscar Hammerstein II	3:27

Side two
No.	Title	Writer(s)	Length
7.	"Martha the Mouth"	Sensible	3:52
8.	"Nobody's Sweetheart"	Gus Kahn, Ernie Erdman, Billy Meyers, Elmer Schoebel	3:18
9.	"(What D'Ya Give) The Man Who's Gotten Everything"	Sensible, Penny Rimbaud	4:20
10.	"Who Is Melody Lee, Sid?"	Sensible	1:53
11.	"Gimme a Uniform"	Sensible	3:50
12.	"Croydon"	Sensible, Hitchcock	5:50

2009 reissue
No.	Title	Writer(s)	Length
1.	"Wot"	Sensible	4:36
2.	"A Nice Cup of Tea"	Sensible	3:21
3.	"Brenda Parts 1 & 2"	Sensible, Hitchcock	7:38
4.	"Yanks With Guns"	Sensible	4:34
5.	"Happy Talk"	Rodgers, Hammerstein II	3:36
6.	"Martha the Mouth"	Sensible	3:53
7.	"Nobody's Sweetheart"	Kahn, Erdman, Meyers, Schoebel	3:21
8.	"(What D'Ya Give) the Man Who's Gotten Everything"	Sensible, Rimbaud	4:24
9.	"Who Is Melody Lee, Sid?"	Sensible	1:58
10.	"Gimme a Uniform"	Sensible	3:59
11.	"Croydon"	Sensible, Hitchcock	4:58

Bonus tracks
No.	Title	Writer(s)	Length
12.	"It" (B-side of "Happy Talk", 1982)	Sensible	1:22
13.	"I Can't Stand It (Demo)" (B-side of "Happy Talk", 1982)	Sensible	4:01
14.	"Strawberry Dross (Extended Version)" (B-side of "Wot", 1982)	Sensible	9:28
15.	"Jimi Hendrix's Strat" (B-side of "Croydon", 1982)	Sensible	5:21
16.	"Damned on 45" (B-side of "Glad It's All Over", 1984)	Various	7:20
17.	"Joe Meek" (Previously unreleased)	Sensible	3:35

== Personnel ==
Credits adapted from the album's liner notes.

Musicians

- Captain Sensible - vocals, guitar, organ
- Tony Mansfield - synthesizer, percussion
- Dolly Mixture - vocals
- Robyn Hitchcock - twelve-string guitar ("Brenda Parts 1 & 2")
- Rod Bowkett - noises ("Happy Talk")
- Beale Street Jazz Band - instruments ("Nobody's Sweetheart")

Production

- Tony Mansfield - producer
- Matthew Fisher - engineer
- Andy Gierus - additional engineer
- Chris Ludwinski - additional engineer
- Jules Bowen - additional engineer
- Mark Proctor - additional engineer
- Simon Smart - additional engineer
- Mixed at Eel Pie Studios, T.M.C. Studios and Ridge Farm Studio

Bonus tracks

- "Jimi Hendrix's Strat" and "Damned on 45" were produced by Captain Sensible
- "I Can't Stand It (Demo)" and "Strawberry Dross" were recorded in Sensible's bedroom on a TEAC Portastudio
- "Joe Meek" is an unfinished 1980s track, completed by Sensible for the 2009 reissue

== Chart positions ==
Charts (1982)	Peak position
UK Albums Chart	64
German Albums Chart	24
New Zealand Albums Charts	50
