= This Is Your Captain Speaking (EP) =

This is Your Captain Speaking

EP by Captain Sensible
- Released: 2 November 1981
- Recorded: 1981
- Studio: Southern Studios, London
- Genre: Rock
- Length: 11:32
- Label: Crass
- Producer: Captain Sensible; Penny Rimbaud

Captain Sensible chronology
| This is Your Captain Speaking (1981) | Women and Captains First (1982) |

This is Your Captain Speaking is a three-track EP by English musician Captain Sensible, released on 2 November 1981 on Crass Records. It was Sensible's first release as a solo artist, while still being a member of rock band the Damned. It reached No. 3 in the UK Indie Chart.

The EP was released in a gatefold picture sleeve and the cover featured a photo montage of Sensible's face on a rabbit head. "(What D'Ya Give) The Man Who's Gotten Everything?" was rerecorded for Sensible's first full-length album Women and Captains First.

== Background ==
After five years as first bassist, then guitarist and songwriter with the Damned, This is Your Captain Speaking marked Sensible's first proper solo outing. In 1978, while the Damned were temporarily disbanded, Sensible had shortly joined the British Amsterdam-based band the Softies, with whom he recorded the single "Jet Boy, Jet Girl", billed as Captain Sensible and the Softies. This is Your Captain Speaking was recorded with the help of Penny Rimbaud, drummer of punk band Crass. It was recorded at Southern Studios in London, the studio of choice for Crass, and released on their independent record label Crass Records. Sensible would be the only established artist with a successful commercial career to be released by Crass Records.

In 2016, Sensible told Punknews.org how he came to work with Crass, "I was noticing fans had Damned and Crass on their jackets so I sought them out to see what they were about. I ended up staying a week at their Epping commune and came out of that experience completely reprogrammed... a vegetarian anarcho type if you like. There were political discussions round the dinner table, and the veggie food was superb. ... and the EP was such fun to make too." Sensible has since cited his meeting with Crass as a turning point in his life, having heightened his social awareness, adopting a vegetarian lifestyle and advocating for pacifist ideas. He called the EP "the product of a few brainstorming days in Southern Studios," and added, "I think it has a sound all of its own."

Looking back on the two-day recording sessions in 2020, Rimbaud said, "The main thing about the recording that I remember, apart from the fact of having to write lyrics whilst I was also trying to produce and help the whole thing run through ... Notably we started one of his solos at something like getting on from midnight. At 4:00 in the morning he was absolutely out of his head with drink, insisting on doing yet another take. I don't know how many takes we did. It was probably 20 takes? In the end we actually chose the first one he did! ... He then went off to bed saying, "Well, this is the tune for tomorrow, and I want some lyrics."

The EP features vocal contributions from the band Dolly Mixture and engineer John Loder's young daughter Tasha. Talking about the track "(What D'Ya Give) The Man Who's Gotten Everything?", Rimbaud said, "For some reason, Captain had come up with those two lines and it was me who was left at 4:00 in the morning to fill in the rest. Which I did, reasonably easily. ... I suppose I was taking the "Money Can't Buy You Love," the old Beatles line. Money can't buy you happiness, it really can't. You can have everything in the world except some profound deep sense of yourself."

== Track listing ==
All lyrics are written by Captain Sensible and Penny Rimbaud; all music is composed by Sensible

| No. | Title | Length |
|---|---|---|
| 1. | "(What D'Ya Give) The Man Who's Gotten Everything?" | 3:26 |
| 2. | "Oursouls to You" | 2:36 |
| 3. | "The Russians Are Coming" | 5:30 |

== Personnel ==
- Captain Sensible − vocals, guitar, bass, keyboards, producer
- Penny Rimbaud − drums, producer (uncredited)
- Dolly Mixture − backing vocals on "(What D'Ya Give) The Man Who's Gotten Everything?" and "The Russians are Coming"
- Tasha Loder − vocals on "Oursouls to You"
- John Loder − engineer
- Dada Nana − cover design

== Chart positions ==
| Chart (1981) | Peak position |
|---|---|
| UK Indie Chart | 3 |
