= Tyrannical Mex =

Studio album by Shillelagh Sisters
- Released: 1993
- Genre: Rockabilly; punk
- Label: NV Records
- Producer: Shillelagh Sisters; Boz Boorer

Shillelagh Sisters chronology
Tyrannical Mex (1993)	Sham'Rock & Roll (2002)

Tyrannical Mex is an album released by rockabilly punk group Shillelagh Sisters. It was released in 1993.

In 1993, Jacquie O'Sullivan, Halpin, and Boz Boorer got together again as the Shillelagh Sisters for a Japanese tour. They recorded an album in one day and in live conditions, titled "Tyrannical Mex", prior to the tour, and then went to Japan with drummer Woodie Taylor. The album was composed of the early material the girls used to perform and is way more similar to their original sound than the 1984 CBS singles.

== Track listing ==
Original track listing

1. "Fool I Am"
2. "Bang Bang"
3. "Black Cadillac"
4. "Let's Elope"
5. "Romp & Stomp"
6. "These Boots Are Made For Walkin'"
7. "My Man"
8. "Hoy Hoy"
9. "Rockin' Lady"
10. "If You Can't Rock Me"
11. "Gotta Know"
12. "Gotta Lotta Rhythm"

Bonus tracks from Boz's Blues E.P.

1. "Sneakin' & Splippin"
2. "Mojo Boogie"
3. "Shake Baby Shake"

Bonus tracks

1. "Mojo Boogie"
2. "Dig Myself A Hole"

== Credits ==
- Shillelagh Sisters - producer
- Boz Boorer - producer (bonus tracks)

== Release history ==
Year	Format	Label	Reference	Country
1993	LP album	NV Records	NVLP8	UK
1998	LP album green vinyl	NV Records	NVLP8	UK
1998	CD album*	NV Records	NVRECD8	UK
2006	CD album**	Raucous Records	820680718824	UK
