= The Greatest Living Englishman =

- Original CD cover

Studio album by Martin Newell
- Released: November 1993
- Recorded: January – August 1993
- Studios: Partridge's shed in Swindon, England
- Genre: Lo-fi
- Length: 46:24
- Label: Humbug
- Producer: Andy Partridge

Martin Newell chronology
The Greatest Living Englishman (1993)	The Off White Album (1995)

The Greatest Living Englishman is an album by English musician Martin Newell, released in November 1993. It was produced, engineered, and mastered by XTC's Andy Partridge, and recorded in his shed on a budget less than £12,000. The album was well received by critics and ultimately became the most acclaimed of Newell's career.

== Background ==
Partridge was contacted to produce the album after his band XTC had gone on strike against their label Virgin Records. Newell submitted 20 of what he considered his best songs to Partridge, but most were rejected. Partridge thought "Martin was a bit shocked at me telling him this. But I started the way I intended to go on which was to be honest with him. ... He wrote some great stuff after that." The available budget for the album was less than £12,000. Normally, his rate was £3000 per song as a producer, but he agreed to take on the project anyway, provided that he receive the entirety of the budget "and handle everything - production, engineering, mastering."

== Recording ==
"The Greatest Living Englishman"
Newell described the song as "a tale about one of these 60s whizz kids when the class barriers broke down in the wake of the Beatles and the Profumo scandal."

Sessions lasted from January to August 1993 at Partridge's home studio shed in Swindon. The album was recorded using an eight-track ADAT and a Macintosh computer. Both musicians recalled that the album's making was not particularly difficult. Martin remembered: "He [Andy] has the hearing of a bat. Things I would've just left, he had me go back and do seven, eight, nine times. He was exacting, but he wasn't cruel. He was fabulous to work with." Partridge similarly described the sessions as "funny and intense. A lot of laughs were had." On the album's songs, Newell denied that he was significantly influenced by the Kinks, and "although I was pretty familiar with the Beach Boys, at the time we were making the record, I'd never heard Pet Sounds. Andy was incredulous when I told him and he immediately made me a cassette copy of it." However, by that time, the album's songs were already composed. XTC member Dave Gregory made frequent visits to the studio and was credited on the sleeve as "Pop Mastermind". Partridge played most of the album's drum tracks with a Yamaha drum pad, since the shed studio was too small to reasonably hold a real full-sized drum kit.

The album's title was originally planned to be Great New Product and credited to "Martin Newell featuring the New & Improved Andy Partridge". Humbug label owner Kevin Crace explained that "by the time we'd finished, it had become obvious that Andy had done so much on this album that he should have some other credit besides 'producer'". It was decided that the album should actually be called The Greatest Living Englishman, but on initial pressings, the credit to a "new and improved" Andy Partridge was retained. He said: "we were going to make it like a soap packet ... [I was credited] like an ingredient. And then suddenly, without me knowing it, the album title changed but for some reason they kept that credit. It made sense when the whole concept was like a soap packet, but then the title changed and it all went out the window."

== Release ==
Professional ratings
Review scores
Source	Rating
AllMusic	4.5/5 stars
Rolling Stone	4/5 stars

The Greatest Living Englishman was warmly received in the US and was met with critical acclaim in France. It also sold well in Germany and Japan. Newell played a small tour in the last three countries with a band that included Dave Gregory, Captain Sensible, the Brotherhood of Lizard's Peter Nice, and the Damned's Garrie Dreadful. In later years, the album went on to become the most acclaimed of Newell's career. He responded that the work was "not necessarily my best album but it's got some good kit on it." Partridge expressed that the "songs are excellent. I'm proud of it. I just wish that I had all the tracks and the obscure equipment it was recorded on and I could remix it. ... It is lo-fi, but dammit, it is lo-fi glorious."

== Track listing ==
All tracks are written by Martin Newell.

No.	Title	Length
1.	"Goodbye Dreaming Fields"	3:57
2.	"Before the Hurricane"	3:03
3.	"We'll Build a House"	2:35
4.	"The Greatest Living Englishman"	4:33
5.	"She Rings the Changes"	3:58
6.	"Home Counties Boy"	3:17
7.	"A Street Called Prospect"	3:31
8.	"Christmas in Suburbia"	3:30
9.	"Straight to You Boy"	4:47
10.	"The Jangling Man"	5:14
11.	"The Green-Gold Girl of the Summer"	5:59
12.	"An Englishman's Home"	2:07
Total length:		46:30

Japanese edition and reissue bonus tracks
No.	Title	Length
13.	"Elizabeth of Mayhem"	3:25
14.	"When My Ship Comes In"	3:57
Total length:		53:55
