= You've Got to Have a Dream =

2004 book by Ian Bradley

You've Got to Have a Dream: The Message of the Musical
- First edition UK cover
- Author: Ian Bradley
- Language: English
- Subject: Music and performing arts; popular culture; practical theology
- Published: 2004 (SCM Press, UK); 2005 (Westminster John Knox Press, US)
- Publication place: England
- Media type: Print
- Pages: 240; 244
- ISBN: 978-0-334-02949-6

You've Got to Have a Dream: The Message of the Musical is a book written by the British theologian and Presbyterian minister Ian Bradley, first published in 2004, exploring the spiritual dimension of musical theatre. In his study, Bradley includes works with an overt religious subject matter, for example, Godspell, Jesus Christ Superstar, and Joseph and the Amazing Technicolor Dreamcoat as well looking at musicals such as Les Misérables, The Lion King, and Carousel. His thesis is that churches have a great deal to learn from modern musicals and could usefully incorporate their spiritual and theological values, and the pastoral care they offer, into their services.

The title You've Got to Have a Dream is a reference to a line in the popular song "Happy Talk" in the Rodgers & Hammerstein musical South Pacific.
