= Ian Bradley =

British academic, author and broadcaster

The Reverend Ian Bradley
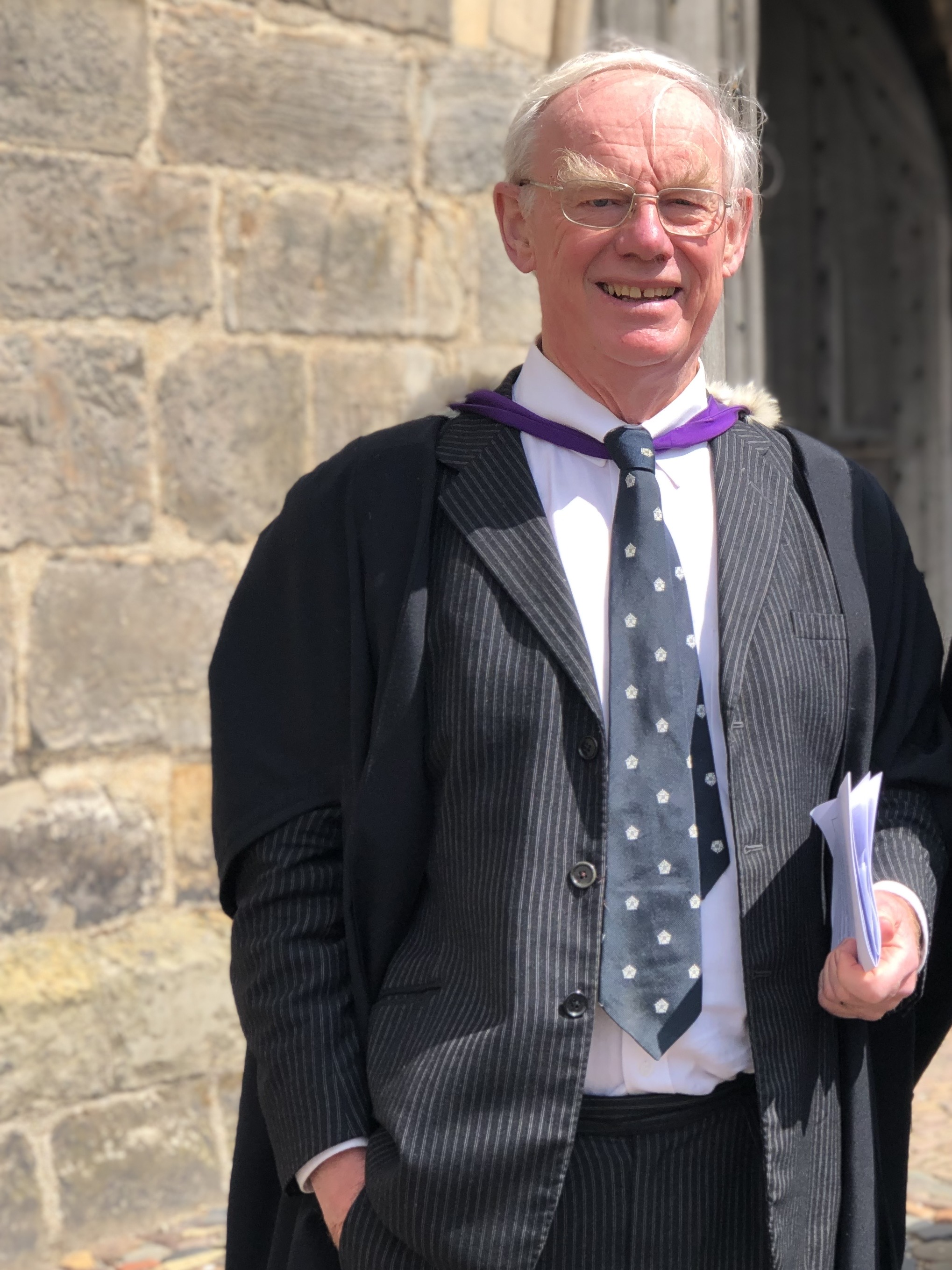
- Born: 28 May 1950 (age 76); Berkhamsted, England
- Occupations: Academic, author and broadcaster

Academic background
- Education: Tonbridge School
- Alma mater: New College, Oxford (MA, PhD); University of St Andrews (BD)

Academic work
- Discipline: History and Divinity

Ian Campbell Bradley (born 28 May 1950) is a British author, broadcaster and retired academic.

He is Emeritus Professor of Cultural and Spiritual History at the University of St Andrews, where he was Principal of St Mary's College, the Faculty and School of Divinity, and honorary Church of Scotland Chaplain.

The author of more than 40 books, Bradley has written widely on cultural and spiritual matters, including Celtic Christianity, the Victorian era, Gilbert and Sullivan, religious music, musical theatre, and the spirituality of water, spas and pilgrimage.

== Life and career ==
=== Early life and education ===
Bradley was born in Berkhamsted, Hertfordshire, on Whit Sunday 1950, the first of two sons of civil servants William Ewart Bradley of County Durham and Mary Campbell Tyre of Argyll. He grew up in the southeast of England and was educated at Tonbridge School and New College, Oxford, where he graduated with a "congratulatory first" in 1971 in modern history. He remained at the University of Oxford to complete a doctoral thesis on religion and politics in early nineteenth-century Britain, earning his DPhil degree. He stood as the Liberal candidate for Sevenoaks at the February 1974 general election, coming second place.

=== Career ===
After leaving Oxford, Bradley took up a post as a general trainee with the BBC. He spent six years on the staff of The Times as a feature writer and leader writer. He has lived in Scotland since 1986. Following further study at the University of St Andrews, from which he graduated with a first-class honours BD degree in theology in 1989, Bradley was ordained to the ministry of the Church of Scotland in 1990, and served as Head of Religious Broadcasting for BBC Scotland between 1990 and 1993.

Having lectured on church history at the University of Aberdeen for many years, Bradley was appointed to a position at the University of St Andrews in 1998, where he was later awarded a Chair in Cultural and Spiritual History in its School of Divinity. He served as Principal of St Mary's College, St Andrews between 2014 and 2017, during which time he was styled The Very Reverend, as is custom for the office. After this, he retired.

He was also associate minister of Holy Trinity Church, St Andrews, and honorary Church of Scotland chaplain for the university. He sat on the committee that drafted the Church of Scotland's Hymnary (Fourth Edition), which was published in 2005. Bradley has taught in the areas of Christianity in contemporary Britain; hymnody, liturgy and worship; monarchy, church and state; and the theology of musical theatre. According to his profile in his 1997 book Abide with Me, he was one of the first lecturers to teach an honors course on hymnology at a British University. In 2013, Bradley was appointed a Commissioner on the Commission on Religion and Belief in British Public Life.

As a journalist, Bradley has contributed to The Guardian, The Daily Telegraph, The Tablet and Life and Work as well as often appearing on Songs of Praise and BBC Radio 4. In 2007, he was awarded a Prize for Outstanding Religious Broadcasting for his BBC Radio 4 documentary on the English hymnal. Bradley frequently writes, broadcasts and lectures about Gilbert and Sullivan and is a regular speaker at the International Gilbert and Sullivan Festivals in Buxton and Harrogate, England.

According to Stephen Bates in his book Royalty Inc.: Britain's Best Known Brand, Bradley preached at Crathie Kirk then stayed the weekend at Balmoral Castle from 14 to 16 September 2002, where he was "driven through the estate by the Queen" and attended a barbecue hosted by Prince Philip, who subsequently wrote to say that he had "much enjoyed" reading God Is Green.

Bradley is the author of more than 40 books. He is married and has two children.

== Bibliography ==
- The Call to Seriousness: The Evangelical Impact on the Victorians (1976)
- William Morris and His World (1978)
- The Optimists: Themes and Personalities in Victorian Liberalism (1980)
- Breaking the mould?: The Birth and Prospects of the Social Democratic Party (1981)
- The English Middle Classes Are Alive and Kicking (1982)
- The Strange Rebirth of Liberal Britain (1986)
- Enlightened Entrepreneurs (1987; reprinted 2007)
- O Love That Wilt Not Let Me Go (1990)
- The Penguin Book of Hymns (1990)
- God Is Green: Christianity and the Environment (1990)
- Marching to the Promised Land: Has the Church a Future? (1992)
- The Celtic Way (1993)
- The Power of Sacrifice (1995)
- The Complete Annotated Gilbert & Sullivan (1996)
- Columba: Pilgrim and Penitent (1996)
- Abide With Me: The World of Victorian Hymns (1997)
- Celtic Christianity: Making Myths and Chasing Dreams (1999)
- The Penguin Book of Carols (2000)
- Colonies of Heaven: Celtic Models for Today's Church (2000)
- God Save the Queen: The Spiritual Dimension of Monarchy (2002)
- You've Got to Have a Dream: The Message of the Musical (2002)
- Oh Joy! Oh Rapture! The Enduring Phenomenon of Gilbert and Sullivan (2005)
- Believing in Britain: The Spiritual Identity of 'Britishness' (2006)
- The Daily Telegraph Book of Hymns (2006)
- The Daily Telegraph Book of Carols (2006)
- Enlightened Entrepreneurs: Business Ethics in Victorian Britain (2007)
- Pilgrimage: A Spiritual and Cultural Journey (2009)
- Grace, Order, Openness and Diversity: Reclaiming Liberal Theology (2010)
- Water Music: Making Music in the Spas of Europe and North America (2010)
- Water: A Spiritual History (2012)
- Lost Chords and Christian Soldiers: The Sacred Music of Arthur Sullivan (2013)
- Argyll: The Making of a Spiritual Landscape (2015)
- The Fife Pilgrim Way: In the Footsteps of Monks, Miners and Martyrs (2019)
- Following the Celtic Way: A New Assessment of Celtic Christianity (2020)
- Health, Hedonism and Hypochondria: The Hidden History of Spas (2020)
- Arthur Sullivan: A Life of Divine Emollient (2021)
- The Quiet Haven: An anthology of readings on death and heaven (2021)
- The Coffin Roads: Journeys to the West (2022)
- God Save the King: The Sacred Nature of the Monarchy (2023)
- Breathers of an Ampler Day: Victorian Views of Heaven (2023)
- Music of the Night: Religious Influences and Spiritual Resonances in Operetta and Musical Theatre (2025)
- The Last Enchanted Places: The Spa Towns of Europe (2026)
- Liquid Faith: Scotland's Sacred and Supernatural Waters (2026)
