= Giles Smith =

British journalist for The Times (born 1962)

Giles Smith (born 1962 in Colchester, Essex) is a British journalist for The Times. In 1998 he was named Sports Columnist of the Year. He attended Colchester Royal Grammar School.

Smith was one of the members of a band called Orphans Of Babylon with Geoff Lawrence, who in 1983 produced the cassette Pinch Me - I Think I'm in Kent, recorded and produced by their friend Dave Hoser, at Future Studios in Chelmsford. The tracks were edited (there were over 200 edits) and mastered at Octopus Studio by Dave. The album was remastered by Dave Hoser in 2014.

In 1986, Smith joined the Dumb Mermaids for a one-off concert at the Quay Theatre Sudbury.

Smith's career in journalism began when he joined The Daily Telegraph in 1990 after a spell as one half of the 1980s band The Cleaners From Venus with Martin Newell. Since then he has written chiefly for The Times.

He has published four books, Lost in Music, about life and growing up with music, and Midnight in the Garden of Evel Knievel, and We Need to Talk About Kevin Keegan, both collections of extracts from his sports columns, and My My! Abba Through the Ages.

He currently writes a motoring column in The Times, and a thrice weekly sport column in The Times. He was a regular contributor to The Word magazine. He also writes for the Chelsea FC website. He is a columnist for the New Statesman.

== Bibliography ==
- Lost in Music
- Midnight in the Garden of Evel Knievel (2000)
- We Need to Talk About Kevin Keegan (2008)
