= Under Wartime Conditions =

Studio album by The Cleaners from Venus
- Released: 1984
- Recorded: January–May 1984
- Genre: Indie pop
- Length: 36:55
- Label: Acid Tapes; Calypso Now; Man at the Off Licence

The Cleaners from Venus chronology
In Golden Autumn (1983)	Under Wartime Conditions (1984)	Songs for a Fallow Land (1985)

Under Wartime Conditions is the seventh album by English musician Martin Newell, under the alias The Cleaners from Venus, released in 1984 by record labels Acid Tapes, Calypso Now and Man at the Off Licence.

== Reception ==
Professional ratings
Review scores
Source	Rating
AllMusic	3/5 stars
Pitchfork	8.1/10

Trouser Press called it "rudimentary and casual, but musically substantial and indicative of anything-goes pop talent". Pitchfork wrote: "If anything, [Under Wartime Conditions] proved his most enjoyably rollicking record yet".

== Track listing ==
All tracks are written by Martin Newell

No.	Title	Length
1.	"Summer in a Small Town"	4:55
2.	"Johnny the Moondog is Dead"	4:06
3.	"Hand of Stone"	3:39
4.	"Drowning Butterflies"	5:00
5.	"Radio Seven"	1:06
6.	"Fracas on West Street"	3:08
7.	"Lukewarm Love Song"	4:17
8.	"A Blue Wave"	2:43
9.	"A Song for Syd Barrett"	3:59
10.	"The Winter Palace"	3:58
