= Midnight Cleaners =

Studio album by the Cleaners from Venus
- Released: December 1982
- Recorded: July – October 1982
- Genres: Indie pop; neo-psychedelia
- Length: 35:37
- Labels: Man at the Off License, Calypso Now

Cleaners from Venus chronology
On Any Normal Monday (1982)	Midnight Cleaners (1982)	In the Golden Autumn (1983)

Professional ratings
Review scores
Source	Rating
AllMusic	3/5 stars
Pitchfork	8.0/10

Midnight Cleaners is the third album by Indie pop artist the Cleaners from Venus, self-released in December 1982. The album was reissued and remastered by Captured Tracks in 2012, although the album was given a small reissue on CD-r in 2001 on JARMusic.

== Background ==
After releasing two albums, drummer Lol Elliott moved 200 miles away to live with his girlfriend at the time, effectively leaving the band. Newell continued recording music around this obstacle, which resulted in a heavier use of drum machines and home-made percussion instruments. The album was recorded entirely onto a 4-track tape in Newell's bedroom. The album cover was drawn and coloured by Newell as well.

== Reception ==
In a retrospective review for the album, Pitchfork writer Ned Raggett praised how the album jumps from "polished and straightforward power-pop efforts" to "the slightly cryptic spoken word, sax, and beat mix of the title track".

== Track listing ==
All tracks are written by Martin Newell.

"Pop Side"
No.	Title	Length
1.	"This Rainy Decade"	2:17
2.	"Time in Vain"	3:02
3.	"Only a Shadow"	3:31
4.	"Corridor of Dreams"	5:10
5.	"Wivenhoe Bells II"	4:22

"Art Side"
No.	Title	Length
1.	"Midnight Cleaners"	5:16
2.	"Factory Boy"	3:29
3.	"A Wretched Street"	3:40
4.	"Don't You Worry About the Ads"	4:50
Total length:		35:37

2001 JARMusic CD-r bonus tracks
No.	Title	Length
1.	"Ilya Kuryakin Looked at Me (Electric Version)"
2.	"Wunderbarmaid"
3.	"Bus Stop"

== Personnel ==
Adapted from 2012 remastered edition liner notes.

- Martin Newell – vocals, guitar, bass, drum machines, keyboards, electronics, glockenspiel
- Lawrence "Lol" Elliott – "some drums and ideas"
- Mick Brannan – saxophone
- "Celia" – additional vocals on "Only a Shadow"
