= Give Me My Freedom =

Single by Shillelagh Sisters
- B-side: "Teasin' Cheatin' Man"
- Released: April 1984
- Genre: Rockabilly, punk
- Length: 2:29 / 6:06
- Label: CBS
- Songwriter(s): W. Levine
- Producer(s): Phil Bloomberg

Shillelagh Sisters singles chronology
"Give Me My Freedom" (1984)	"Passion Fruit" (1984)

"Give Me My Freedom" is the debut single by Shillelagh Sisters, released in April 1984 by CBS. The group had some press coverage and also did some television shows (most notably The Tube) and a John Peel session at Radio One. The Shillelagh Sisters also went on tour as the supporting act for the rock band Spear of Destiny. However, all this promotion did not lead to pop success and their single charted poorly at No. 100 on the UK Singles Chart in May 1984.

== Discography ==
Cover	Year	Track listings	Format	Label	Reference	Country
	1984	Side 1: "Give Me My Freedom" (7" version) 2'29; Side 2: "Teasin' Cheatin' Man" (7" version) 2'07	7" single	CBS	A4217	UK
	1984	Side 1: "Give Me My Freedom" (Extended Club Mix) 6'06; Side 2: "Teasin' Cheatin' Man" (7" version) 2'07	12" single	CBS	TA4217	UK
	1984	Side 1: "Give Me My Freedom" (Extended Club Mix) 6'06; Side 2: "Teasin' Cheatin' Man" (7" version) 2'07	12" promo single included release sheet	CBS	TA4217	UK
	1984	Side 1: "Give Me My Freedom" (7" version) 2'29; Side 2: "Teasin' Cheatin' Man" (7" version) 2'07	12" Shamrock Shaped; Picture disc single	CBS	WA4217	UK
