= Steve Travis =

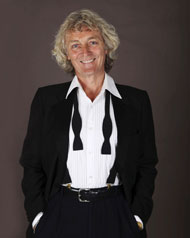
- Photo of Steve Travis

Background information
- Born: Stephen Greenfield; 17 March 1951 (age 75); Colchester
- Genres: Country music; rock; sea shanties
- Occupations: Musician, songwriter, poet, author, craftsman
- Instruments: Vocals, guitar, piano, drums
- Years active: 1964–present
- Labels: Frontier; MJMusic; Blue Water Music; Foam Records; Prism; Aqua Vision; H&H Music
- Website: http://www.stevetravis.co.uk

Steve Travis is an English retired singer-songwriter, musician, recording artist and author. He was born and raised in Colchester, Essex. His biggest selling albums are in the easy listening country style. More recently Travis has been known for sea shanties including "Billy O'Shea" that debuted in April 2021 on BBC Radio Essex with fellow musician and "Wellerman" creator Nathan Evans.

== Musical career ==
=== Rock and pop; 1964–1979 ===
Travis began his music career in the mid 1960s as a drummer in Colchester bands performing progressive rock. In 1970, he made a switch to guitar and vocals and formed the glam-rock band, Plod. As a pop singer throughout the 1970s, he made many appearances alongside top acts including ELO, Genesis, Slade, Thin Lizzy, and Showaddywaddy. He then went on to form the hard rock band, The Perishers. They attracted the interest of London-based management company Deville Promotions and quickly booked time in Polydor Studios in London and recorded four demo tracks. These were original rock songs written by Travis. At that time Travis bore a likeness to Marc Bolan and his photograph appeared next to the late T. Rex frontman in national newspapers in 1979.

=== Country; 1981–2004 ===
Travis moved on to country music issuing a single in 1982 entitled "Ghost Riders in the Sky" / "Moonlight on the Trail". This received excellent reviews in many of the music papers. For some years Travis retreated completely from the music business to concentrate on family life.

In 1991, Travis returned to performing country music and toured in the UK and Europe topping the bill at many CMC clubs, festivals and theatres. In 1994, he released his first CD album on the MJMusic record label, later signing a record deal with the Irish label Foam Records in 1997. His first album, 50 Country & Favourite Songs, a sing-along album in the style of Max Bygraves, sold over 100,000 copies and achieved a silver disc for sales. Travis released a further 14 albums on the Foam label then continued his career with London-based Prism Leisure in 2003.

=== Contemporary; 2004–2010 ===
In 2004, Travis composed and played keyboards on an album of relaxation music titled Healing Shores released on the Aquavision label. Following this an album of his narrated poetry set to music entitled Fragments of Desire was released on the Blue Water music label, taken from the book of the same name.

=== Sea shanties; 2010–present ===
With an increasing enthusiasm for sea shanties and inspiration from his longtime home by the sea in West Mersea there came a change of musical style. In 2012, H&H Music released Travis' first shanty album, Shanties and Other Songs of the Sea and a music video for his song "The Black Water Smuggler", reflects the history of the Blackwater Estuary. It was followed in 2017 by Sea Shanties and Pirate Songs.

In 2021 Travis created his first charity single to support a Horse & Animal rescue group in Tenerife where he now resides.

== Album discography ==
Year	Album	Label
1982	Ghost Riders in the Sky	Frontier
1994	Roses After the Rain	MJMusic
1994	The Song Book	Blue Water Music
1994	Sings Country	Blue Water Music
1994	Sings Raymond Froggatt	Blue Water Music
1997	50 Country and Favourite Super Songs	Foam Records
1997	Life Is What You Make It	Foam Records
1997	50 Songs You Love to Sing	Foam Records
1997	50 Songs You Want to Hear	Foam Records
1997	50 Singalong Country Party	Foam Records
1997	Songs of Love	Foam Records
1997	For the Good Times	Foam Records
1997	Singalong Christmas	Foam Records
1997	Country Gospel	Foam Records
1997	50 Singalong Old Time Favourites	Foam Records
1997	Nashville Collection	Foam Records
1997	Everything I Own	Foam Records
1997	Jukebox Favourites	Foam Records
1997	Irish Collection	Foam Records
2002	When Yesterday Was Now	Blue Water Music
2003	Life Is What You Make It	Prism
2003	Best of Friends	Prism
2003	Enjoy Yourself	Prism
2004	Healing Shores	Aquavision
2006	Travellin' Light	H&H Music
2006	Welcome to My World	H&H Music
2006	Monster Country	H&H Music
2006	Steve Travis Songs That Won the War	H&H Music
2010	Fragment of Desire	Blue Water Music
2012	Shanties and Other Songs of the Sea	H&H Music
2017	Sea Shanties and Pirate Songs	H&H Music

== Bibliography ==
- As I Recall It. 2005 Blue Water Music, 56 page book of humorous short stories
- A Pirate's Kiss. 2006 Blue Water Music, 36 page book of poems
- One Man and His Microphone. 2011 Memoirs. Amusing fact and fiction, ISBN 9781471696640
- Fragments of Desire. 2013 A compilation of poems, lyrics and short stories, ISBN 9781326073725
- T'were Rite Funny. 2014 Comical short stories, ISBN 9781326290054
- Dr Scrotum's Sex Facts for Men and Women. 2015 A compilation of vintage adverts and sex advice from the early 20th Century, ISBN 9781312640580
