= Captain Sensible =

British musician (born 1954)

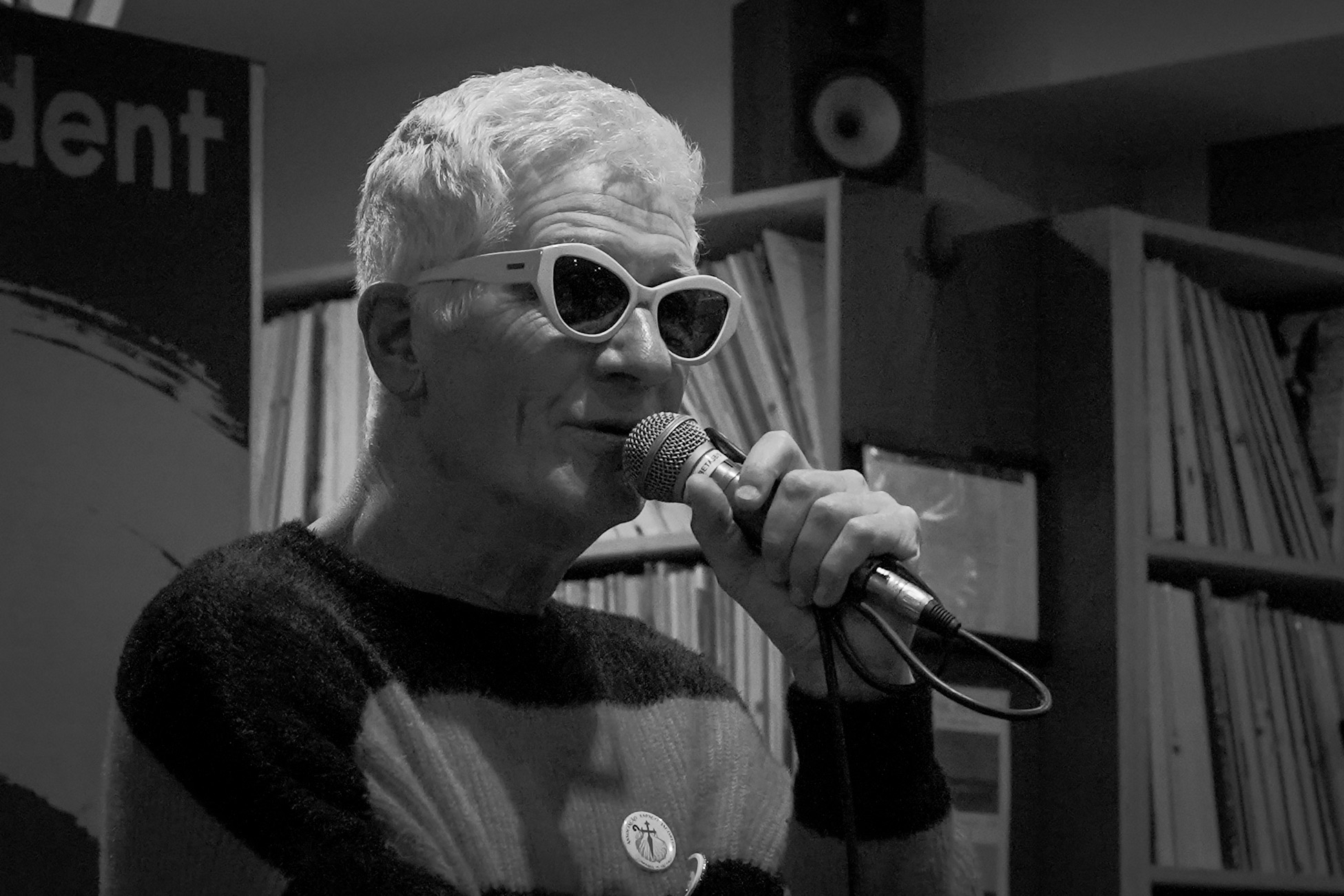
- Captain Sensible in Brighton, January 2026. Photographed by Levi Woodbridge

Background information
- Born: Raymond Ian Burns; 24 April 1954 (age 72); Balham, London, England
- Genres: Punk rock; new wave
- Occupations: Musician; songwriter
- Instruments: Guitar; bass; keyboards; vocals
- Years active: 1976–present
- Labels: A&M; Deltic; Humbug
- Member of: The Damned; the Jack Tars; the Sensible Gray Cells
- Formerly of: Johnny Moped; Dead Men Walking; Masters of the Backside

Raymond Ian Burns (born 24 April 1954), known by the stage name Captain Sensible, is an English guitarist, singer and songwriter. He co-founded the punk rock band the Damned in 1976, originally playing bass before switching to guitar. He is known for his distinctive appearance including a red beret and sunglasses, typically with white frames. Sensible embarked on a solo career during the 1980s, achieving a UK number one hit with his version of Rodgers and Hammerstein's "Happy Talk" (1982) and further hits with "Wot" (1982) and "Glad It's All Over" (1984). In 2006, Sensible founded the Blah! Party. He continues to perform in the Damned.

== Early life ==
Raymond Ian Burns was born in Balham, London, on 24 April 1954. He went to Stanley Technical School for Boys in South Norwood, Croydon. The first musical instrument he played was a Bontempi organ. Growing up, he listened to Brian Auger, Syd Barrett, Small Faces, Egg, Stray, Soft Machine and the Groundhogs.

His father hailed from the Gorbals in Glasgow.

His brother, Phil Burns, was a vocalist in Johnny Moped.

== The Damned ==
Originally a member of the Johnny Moped band, Captain Sensible joined the Damned in 1976 on the suggestion of his colleague Rat Scabies, the band's drummer. He filled a number of positions during his tenure (including bassist, lead guitarist and keyboardist), and eventually becoming the band's main songwriter following the departure of Brian James.

The nickname Captain Sensible was ironic, as he was known for wild antics and mischievous behavior. Early in the Damned's history they toured France with singer Sean Tyla during 1976. Tyla observed Burns covered in food scraps and reeking of spilt beer after a particularly busy evening and commented: “You've got a right bloody captain sensible there”.

Captain Sensible left in the 1980s to concentrate on solo projects, and studied in West Sussex but rejoined in 1996 after Scabies left, and co-wrote Grave Disorder, the band's first new studio album for eight years, in 2001. He continues to tour and record with the band.

== Solo career ==
Captain Sensible's first solo release came in 1978 with the single "Jet Boy, Jet Girl", an Elton Motello cover recorded while the Damned were on hiatus. He followed this in 1981 with the This Is Your Captain Speaking EP on Crass Records. He signed to A&M Records and had a UK number one hit in 1982 with a cover of "Happy Talk", the Rodgers and Hammerstein song from South Pacific, featuring backing by Dolly Mixture and a band including Robyn Hitchcock on guitar. This was later sampled for British hip hop artist Dizzee Rascal's 2004 song "Dream".

Other Captain Sensible songs that became hits in the UK and Europe were "Wot", "One Christmas Catalogue" and anti-Falklands War "Glad It's All Over", which was co-written and produced by Tony Mansfield. After quitting A&M Records he continued recording for various independent labels, including Deltic Records and Humbug Records. He has also toured with his solo band Punk Floyd.

Captain Sensible's recording of "The Snooker Song" from Mike Batt's musical The Hunting of the Snark was used as the theme music for the BBC gameshow Big Break, and he also wrote and performed a song called "Brain's Theme" for the movie Skinned Deep in 2004.

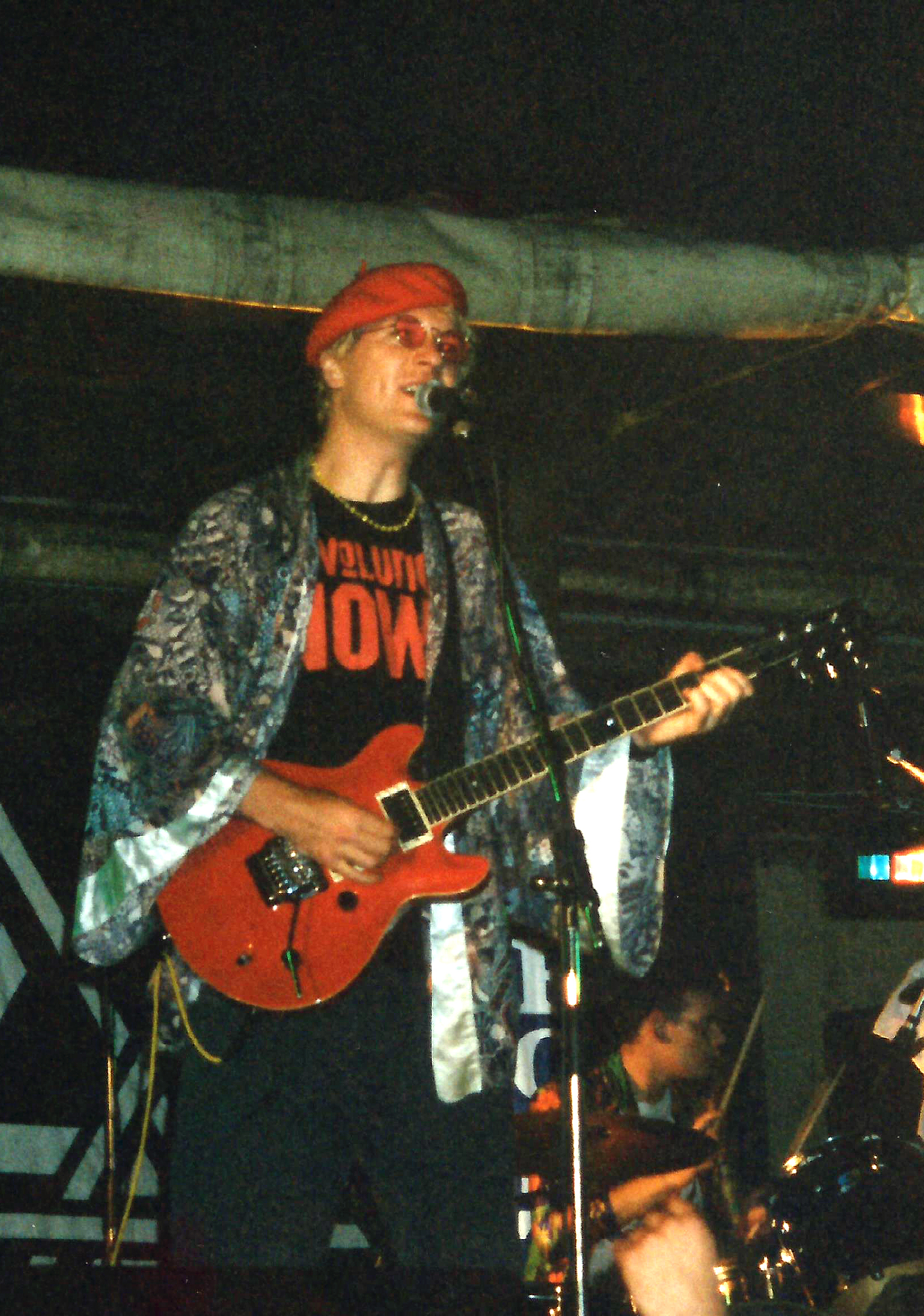
Captain Sensible performing live in Abergavenny, 1994

Captain Sensible is also a member of Dead Men Walking, a supergroup featuring Mike Peters, Kirk Brandon (Spear of Destiny) and Slim Jim Phantom, and the Sensible Gray Cells with current Damned mate Paul Gray.

== Politics ==
"I always wanted to put a brick through the TV when I saw Blair pop his head up. It's quite easy to write lyrics when politicians are so corrupt. I had to start my own political party I was so angry. I called it the Blah Party. It was 50 per cent joke, 50 per cent serious but was my way of dealing with it."

— Burns in November 2008

In September 2006, Captain Sensible formed a new British political party known as the Blah! Party, saying, "We believe that voting is an important part of the democratic process, and we want the Blah! Party to be the party of protest, a channel through which the people of the U.K. can vent their dissatisfaction at nonsensical everyday things, and protest against the government and the current crop of political parties."

The Blah! Party was largely modelled on the principle of direct democracy, with suggestions being made by anyone on the party website. These suggestions would then be voted on by the membership, resulting in a "rolling manifesto." The party was launched on 24 September 2006 at a conference in Manchester. Initial policies included stopping "chav culture and the idolisation of airhead celebrities like the Beckhams, Paris Hilton and Jade Goody", alongside more serious policies of opposing the Iraq War and ID cards, instead spending money on public transport, hospitals and renewable energy.

The Blah! Party entered into a sponsorship deal with Seabrook Crisps in September 2006, with the party logo and details on joining for free printed on their packets. The party also received non-financial support from PR company Propaganda. The party received £168,309 in the last quarter of 2006. The party was debt-free in 2008, with a membership of 8,544, up from 5,000 in 2007.

The first Blah! Party candidate was Carl Finlan, who stood in the 2007 local elections in Thornton and Allerton ward, Bradford. He gained 69 votes (1.6%). Deputy leader Melodie Staniforth stood in the Holme Valley North ward of Kirklees as 'Boney Maroney' in 2008. She gained 38 votes (0.68%). She resigned shortly afterwards.

On 11 September 2007, Propaganda handed total control of the Blah! Party to Captain Sensible, former Official Monster Raving Loony Party deputy leader Melodie Staniforth, Robert Staniforth, Sadie Ingoldby, Shaun Nightingale and Gary Spate. In December 2008, Propaganda closed the website. The party ended its association with Propaganda and Seabrook, launching a new website. At the same time it de-registered from the register of political parties, deciding to instead be a protest group.

== Personal life ==
Captain Sensible was previously in a long term relationship with Rachel Bor of Dolly Mixture. The couple have three children together. He is currently married to Mayumi.

Burns adopted his stage name Captain Sensible ironically because he described himself as a "debauched maniac" who had fun "regardless of the consequences." However, after living at Dial House (the commune where the anarcho-punk band Crass lived) for a week to record an EP in 1981, his life changed and he became a vegetarian who adhered to Crass' pacifist and creative aims. Captain Sensible has written several songs about animal rights, including "Torture Me" and most notably the 1985 single "Wot! No Meat?".

Burns is a trainspotter, particularly enjoying diesel locomotives after being rescued from a stranded service in cold weather by one as a child. He later named Deltic Records after the Deltic locomotives. Class 47 diesel locomotive 47810 was previously named Captain Sensible after Burns. He is also a passionate supporter of Crystal Palace FC.

== Discography ==
=== Solo ===
Albums

- Women and Captains First (1982), A&M – UK No. 64
- The Power of Love (1983), A&M
- Revolution Now (1989), Deltic
- The Universe of Geoffrey Brown (1993), Humbug
- Live at the Milky Way (1994), Humbug
- Meathead (1995), Humbug
- Mad Cows and Englishmen (1996), Scratch

Compilations

- Sensible Singles (1984), A&M
- A Day in the Life of ... (1984), A&M
- A Slice of Captain Sensible (1997), Humbug
- The Captain's Box (1997), Humbug – [contains A Slice of Captain Sensible and Meathead]
- Sensible Lifestyles: The Best of Captain Sensible (1997), Cleopatra
- The Masters (1998), Eagle [reissue of Mad Cows and Englishmen, including bonus tracks]
- The Collection (2003), Spectrum Music

EPs

- This Is Your Captain Speaking (1981), Crass – UK Indie No. 3
- The Universe of Captain Sensible (1998), Jarmusic [contains 5 tracks from Revolution Now and The Universe of Geoffrey Brown]

Singles

Year	Single	Peak chart positions								
Year	Single	UK	AUS	AUT	BE	GER	IRE	NL	NZ	SWI
1978	"Jet Boy, Jet Girl" (Netherlands-only release) (Note: Credited to 'Captain Sensible and the Softies'. The song also appeared as the B-side to the Damned's 1982 single "Wait for the Blackout")	—	—	—	—	—	—	—	—	—
1980	"Millionaire" (Note: Credited to 'Magic Michael with Rat Scabies & Captain Sensible')	—	—	—	—	—	—	—	—	—
1980	"Disco Girls" / "Blu Shoes" (Note: There were three different simultaneous releases, which had different credits: 'The Sunset Boys + Captain Sensible', 'Maxims Trash with Captain Sensible', and 'Maximum Mania with Captain Sensible')	—	—	—	—	—	—	—	—	—
1982	"Hey Jo" (Note: Split promo single with Dead Kennedys, Infa Riot and Flux of Pink Indians titled "Extracts from Wargasm")	—	—	—	—	—	—	—	—	—
1982	"Happy Talk"	1	35	—	36	—	1	37	24	—
1982	"Wot"	26	30	4	3	4	24	14	6	3
1982	"Croydon"	—	—	—	—	—	—	—	—	—
1983	"Stop the World"	82	—	—	—	72	—	—	—	—
1983	"I'm a Spider"	177	—	—	—	—	—	—	—	—
1984	"Glad It's All Over" / "Damned on 45"	6	—	—	—	—	6	—	—	—
1984	"There Are More Snakes Than Ladders"	57	—	—	—	—	—	—	—	—
1984	"One Christmas Catalogue" / "Relax"	79	—	—	—	—	—	—	—	—
1985	"Wot, No Meat?" (Note: Credited to 'Captain Sensible & the Missus' (duet with Rachel Bor of Dolly Mixture))	—	—	—	—	—	—	—	—	—
1985	"Come On Down"	116	—	—	—	—	—	—	—	—
1987	"Revolution Now"	120	—	—	—	—	—	—	—	—
1988	"The Snooker Song"	—	—	—	—	—	—	—	—	—
1988	"The Toys Take Over"	—	—	—	—	—	—	—	—	—
1988	"I Get So Excited"	—	—	—	—	—	—	—	—	—
1990	"Smash It Up (Part 4)" (Note: Split single with the Brotherhood of Lizards)	—	—	—	—	—	—	—	—	—
1993	"Holiday in My Heart"	—	—	—	—	—	—	—	—	—
1993	"Wot '93"	—	—	—	—	—	—	—	—	—
1994	"The Hokey Cokey"	71	—	—	—	—	—	—	—	—
1995	"Flip Top World"	—	—	—	—	—	—	—	—	—
1997	"While Wrecking the Car" (Germany-only release)	—	—	—	—	—	—	—	—	—
1998	"Cigarette Sandy" (Note: Split single with the Real People)	—	—	—	—	—	—	—	—	—
1999	"Missing the Boat"	—	—	—	—	—	—	—	—	—
2005	"Wot (I Say Captain)" (Note: Credited as 'Erkan & Stefan feat. Captain Sensible & Trooper Da Don')	—	—	—	—	80	—	—	—	—
2014	"Wot" (Note: with LaBrassBanda)	—	—	—	—	—	—	—	—	—
"—" denotes releases that did not chart or were not released

=== The Damned ===
- Damned Damned Damned (1977)
- Music for Pleasure (1977)
- Machine Gun Etiquette (1979)
- The Black Album (1980)
- Strawberries (1982)
- Grave Disorder (2001)
- So, Who's Paranoid? (2008)
- Evil Spirits (2018)
- The Rockfield Files (2020)
- Darkadelic (2023)

=== Dead Men Walking ===
- Live At CBGB New York City (2005), Resistance
- Graveyard Smashes Volume 1 (2006), Resistance
- Easy Piracy (2015), Slimstyle Records

=== The Sensible Gray Cells ===
- A Postcard from Britain (2013), Easy Action
- Get Back into the World (2020), Damaged Goods

=== The Jack Tars ===
- The Jack Tars EP (2015)
