= Wot (song) =

Single by Captain Sensible

from the album Women and Captains First
- A-side: "Wot"
- B-side: "Strawberry Dross"
- Released: 6 August 1982
- Genre: New wave; disco; pop
- Length: 5:52 (12" version); 3:20 (7" US version); 3:22 (7" EU version)
- Label: A&M
- Songwriter: Captain Sensible
- Producer: Tony Mansfield

Captain Sensible singles chronology
"Happy Talk" (1982)	"Wot" (1982)	"Croydon" (1982)

"Wot" is a 1982 single by English musician Captain Sensible released by A&M Records. The song was produced by Tony Mansfield and features the group Dolly Mixture on backing vocals. The song charted in the United Kingdom and was a specialist hit in the United States, but enjoyed its greatest success in continental Europe.

== Production ==
Sensible described the song's creation in a SFX Magazine interview: - While the Damned were touring in the USA, he heard this horrible pounding sound coming from outside at 5am. It was coming from a building site and as it was so early and he wanted to sleep in the hotel, he recorded the noise to make a complaint. He played it to the reception, informing them that it was disgusting and a ploy to upset British bands, and he was trying to get some sleep. They just said, "Have a nice day" and nothing was done. Sensible got no sleep. When he returned to the UK, he played the tape to Tony Mansfield who took the tape and created a loop (backing track) from it within about 10 minutes. This sound loop formed the basis of the song. The loop can be heard clearly at the beginning and near the end of the song. The song's lyrics were also based on his lack of sleep and noisy events. Sensible explained that they simply "added more rubbish on top of the track" to build up the song.

The song was originally going to be called "Cap's Rap".

== Genre ==
AllMusic's Stephen Cook described "Wot" as "Sugarhill Gang-inspired new wave disco". Stephen "Spaz" Schnee from the same website called the song a "radio-friendly [slice] of lighthearted keyboard-based pop".

== Release ==
"Wot" was released on A&M Records. In the United Kingdom, "Wot" was in the United Kingdom charts for seven weeks, peaking at number 26. In the United States, "Wot" peaked on Billboards's Hot Dance Club Play Singles chart at number 24. In France, the single was certified gold by the Syndicat National de l'Édition Phonographique (SNEP).

"Wot" was performed by Captain Sensible on Top of the Pops with Dolly Mixture as the backing group. Dolly Mixture had mixed feelings about appearing on Top of the Pops so often as it led to them being recognized more as backup musicians than for their own work.

== Reception ==
Online music database AllMusic described both the songs "Wot" and "A Nice Cup of Tea" as "well-crafted pop tunes that deliver the goods".

== Credits ==
Credits adapted from Wot record sleeve.

- Mark Proctor – engineer
- Matthew Fisher – engineer
- Andy Gierus – assistant engineer
- Janette Beckman – photography
- Tony Mansfield – producer

== Charts ==
=== Weekly charts ===
Chart (1982–1983)	Peak position
Australia (Kent Music Report)	30
Austria (Ö3 Austria Top 40)	4
Belgium (Ultratop 50 Flanders)	3
France (IFOP)	3
Ireland (IRMA)	24
Netherlands (Dutch Top 40)	10
Netherlands (Single Top 100)	14
New Zealand (Recorded Music NZ)	6
Switzerland (Schweizer Hitparade)	3
UK Singles (OCC)	26
US Billboard Hot Dance Club Play	24
West Germany (GfK)	4

=== Year-end charts ===
Chart (1982)	Position
France (IFOP)	16
Netherlands (Dutch Top 40)	96

Chart (1983)	Position
West Germany (Official German Charts)	15

== Certifications ==
Region	Certification	Certified units/sales
France (SNEP)	Gold	500,000^{*}
^{*} Sales figures based on certification alone.
