= The Flowerpot Men =

British electronic music group

The Flowerpot Men were a British electronic music group active in the 1980s. This group featured electronic musician Ben Watkins (of Juno Reactor), Paul N. Davies (of Naked Lunch), and cellist Adam Peters.

== Works ==
They recorded several EPs including Alligator Bait, Jo's So Mean and The Janice Long Session. The EP Jo's So Mean was produced by Siouxsie and the Banshees' co-founder Steven Severin who described it as "a proto-techno classic". Their most successful and well-known song, "Beat City", was featured in the 1986 film Ferris Bueller's Day Off.

Prior to the Flowerpot Men, Adam Peters had played cello and piano parts on some Echo & the Bunnymen tracks including "Never Stop" and "The Killing Moon".

The group later became known as Sunsonic and released the full-length LP Melting Down on Motor Angel in 1990.

== Post-Flowerpot Men ==
After Sunsonic, Ben Watkins went on to form Juno Reactor, a multifaceted project that has released seven studio albums, scored Hollywood films, and toured with multiple live bands and stage performers.

Adam Peters became a composer for feature films, documentaries, and television.

== Discography ==
- Jo's So Mean (1984), Compost Records
- "Walk on Gilded Splinters" (1985), Compost Records
- Alligator Bait EP (1987), Compost Records
- The Janice Long Session (1987), Strange Fruit
- "Watching the Pharoahs" (1987), Link
