= Happy Talk (song) =

1949 show tune from the Rodgers and Hammerstein musical South Pacific

Song
- Published: 1949
- Songwriter: Oscar Hammerstein II
- Composer: Richard Rodgers

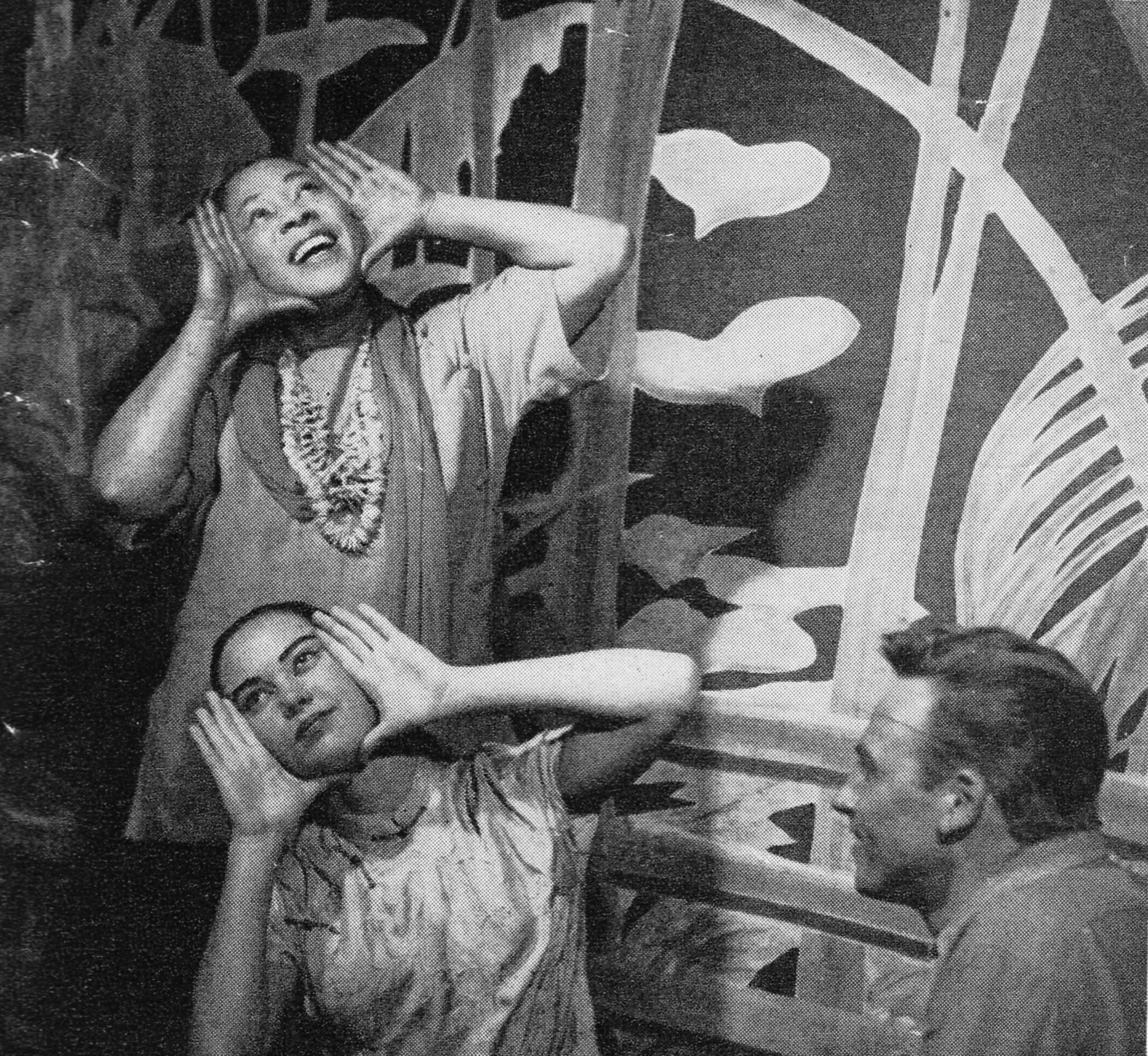
From top: Juanita Hall as Bloody Mary singing "Happy Talk", Betta St. John as Liat, and William Tabbert as Lt. Cable in the original Broadway cast of South Pacific (1950).

"Happy Talk" is a show tune from the 1949 Rodgers and Hammerstein musical South Pacific. It is sung by Bloody Mary to the American lieutenant Joe Cable, about having a happy life, after he begins romancing her daughter Liat. Liat performs the song with hand gestures as Mary sings.

Ella Fitzgerald recorded this song with Gordon Jenkins and his orchestra for Decca and it was included on her 1955 album Miss Ella Fitzgerald & Mr Gordon Jenkins Invite You to Listen and Relax.

== Captain Sensible version ==
"Happy Talk"

Single by Captain Sensible

from the album Women and Captains First
- Released: 26 June 1982
- Genre: Synthpop, new wave
- Length: 3:24
- Label: A&M
- Composer: Richard Rodgers
- Lyricist: Oscar Hammerstein II
- Producer: Tony Mansfield

Captain Sensible singles chronology
"Jet Boy, Jet Girl" (1977)	"Happy Talk" (1982)	"Wot" (1982)

In July 1982, The Damned's guitarist Captain Sensible reached the No. 1 position on the UK Singles Chart for two weeks with his version of the song, featuring backing vocals by the band Dolly Mixture. This version also peaked at number 35 in Australia.

== Other cover versions ==
- Ella Fitzgerald recorded a version with Gordon Jenkins and His Orchestra on the Decca 78 rpm single "I'm Gonna Wash That Man Right Outa My Hair" / "Happy Talk". It later appeared on the 1955 Decca compilation album, Miss Ella Fitzgerald & Mr Gordon Jenkins Invite You to Listen and Relax.
- Muriel Smith recorded "Happy Talk" in November 1951 on the UK Columbia record label, DB2957.
- Doris Day recorded "Happy Talk" in December 1960 for her album Bright and Shiny.
- Nancy Wilson sang "Happy Talk" on her 1961 collaboration with Cannonball Adderley, Nancy Wilson/Cannonball Adderley.
- Claudine Longet recorded a version for her album Love is Blue (1968).
- In 1967, Harpers Bizarre did a cover of the song, including it in their album Feelin' Groovy, which was released in the same year.
- Daniel Johnston covered the song at least two times, first on his solo 1983 cassette "The Lost Recordings II", and later with Jad Fair on their album It's Spooky, released in 1989.
- The Four Freshmen covered the song on the album Voices in Fun (1961).
- Karrin Allyson covered the song on the 2015 album Many a New Day: Karrin Allyson Sings Rodgers & Hammerstein with Kenny Barron and John Patitucci.
- Don Shirley covered the song on an album released in 1959.

=== Samples ===
- In 2004, UK grime MC Dizzee Rascal sampled Captain Sensible's version on the single "Dream", which reached No. 14 on the UK Singles Chart.

=== Film ===
- A brief clip of the song, played on an organ, can be heard in The Wrong Trousers, in a sequence where Gromit is unable to sleep because of loud music.
- The Don Shirley Trio plays the song during a concert scene in Green Book (2018).
- Both the original version and the Captain Sensible cover were used in the 2003 short documentary film Just a Clown, directed by Andrew Jarecki.
- The 2014 movie Welcome to Me opens with this song.

=== Games ===
- An interpolation of the song was used as the main theme of the educational Commodore 64 game Rekenwonder (1984).

== See also ==
- You've Got to Have a Dream (2004 book)
