= Martin Newell (musician) =

English singer-songwriter, poet, columnist, and author

- Newell in 2007

Background information
- Also known as: The Psychedelic Gardener, Mr. Mule
- Born: 4 March 1953 (age 73); Harpenden, Hertfordshire, England
- Genres: Indie pop; jangle pop; post-punk; psychedelia
- Occupations: Musician, poet, columnist, author
- Instruments: Vocals, guitar, piano, bass, mandolin, harmonica
- Years active: 1973–present
- Labels: Liberty; RCA; Humbug; Cherry Red; Burger; Captured Tracks
- Website: cleanersfromvenus.com

Martin Newell (born 4 March 1953) is an English singer-songwriter, poet, columnist and author. He is best known for leading the Cleaners from Venus, which has been a solo project since 1988. He is regarded as a significant figure in the history of cassette culture and DIY music. In contemporary music culture, he is known as a pioneer of jangle pop.

== Musical career ==
=== 1973–1979 ===
In the summer of 1973, a 20-year-old Newell joined Colchester glam rock cover band Plod as their lead singer, replacing founder member Steve Greenfield. Plod was signed to London-based indie label Banjul Records in early 1975, and quickly began recording tracks for an album. However, contractual irregularities and financial problems at the label prevented the album from being finished or released, and the band broke up within a few months of being signed. In 2003, one track from the sessions ("Neo City") was released on a '70s glam-rock compilation CD titled Velvet Tinmine. This track was credited to The Plod, and remains the only officially issued work by the band.

Newell then joined Gypp, a pop-oriented progressive rock band, as lead singer. Gypp also played abroad and became popular in Germany's North Rhine-Westphalia area thanks to their live performances. Gypp issued one three-song 7-inch EP in 1978, but their music was out of step with the punk-oriented trends of the UK music scene at the time and the EP received a negative review in the New Musical Express. Demoralised, Newell left the band. By his own account, he then became a "musical recluse", staying in the studio and creating new songs but not playing live gigs for many years.

=== 1979–1992 ===
In the late-70s, Newell led a four-piece rock combo called the Stray Trolleys. They recorded material in 1979 and 1980, but it was not released until after the band had broken up.

In the meantime, Newell issued his first solo single ("Young Jobless" b/w "Sylvie in Toytown") on vinyl in 1980. By the end of 1980, he was collaborating with Lawrence "Lol" Elliot as the Cleaners from Venus, a band that mostly released their work on cassettes outside the traditional music distribution channels.

By 1983, the Cleaners from Venus had evolved into a band with a floating line-up that featured Newell as its only constant member. The band still primarily issued material on cassette, got signed to the West German independent label Modell Records for one vinyl album (Under Wartime Conditions) and ultimately to the German subsidiary of RCA Records, which released two albums (Going to England, Town and Country).

Giles Smith joined Newell as the only other official member of the Cleaners from Venus between 1986-1988, and in 1987, Newell returned to performing live under the Cleaners from Venus banner. As well, while regularly releasing the Cleaners from Venus material on cassette, through the 1980s Newell also occasionally released cassette singles and albums under his own name. On these solo releases he was usually the only musician.

In the spring of 1988, Newell and Nelson (Peter Nice) formed the duo the Brotherhood of Lizards, self-releasing the mini-album The Brotherhood of Lizards that year, followed by the album, Lizardland, released on independent label Deltic Records in 1989. To support Lizardland the duo embarked on an eco-friendly promotional tour, cycling over 1000 miles across southern England between October 1989 and February 1990 making local radio appearances and doing local newspaper interviews, while also busking and performing gigs. The uniqueness of this "green tour" caught the attention of the mainstream media with the duo making half a dozen television appearances, and interviews with them appeared in the NME, Melody Maker, The Guardian, The Independent, The Mail on Sunday and Time Out. On completion of the tour, Nelson was recruited as the replacement bass player for the band New Model Army and the Brotherhood of Lizards disbanded.

=== 1993–present ===
In 1993, Newell began working primarily as a solo artist with more conventional production values. His first non-cassette solo album, The Greatest Living Englishman, was produced by XTC's Andy Partridge, and was a critical success. Commercially, it remains his most popular and successful album. It was followed by three more albums (The Off White Album, produced by Louis Philippe, The Spirit Cage and Radio Autumn Attic) and an EP (Songs from the Station Hotel) that continued to explore the same subject matter as The Greatest Living Englishman, including the charms of rural or small-town English life and portraits of characters and scenes.

Newell has also made live appearances with the Cleaners from Venus and the Stray Trolleys in the 1990s and beyond, and has issued several post-1993 live recordings with these bands. However, studio releases credited to these groups post-1993 are actually all CD reissues of pre-1993 material previously released only on cassette. In addition, Gypp played reunion gigs in 1996, and live Gypp material – as well as Gypp demos recorded in the late 1970s – have now been officially issued on CD.

In 2004 Newell released an album of light jazz songs, The Light Programme. The album was not particularly successful commercially but his next album, A Summer Tamarind, returned to his usual style and was much more warmly received.

In late 2005, the British singer Richard Shelton released a jazz vocal album called Top Cat with five Newell compositions. Newell's songs have also been recorded by Miki Huber, the Jennifers, Kerry Getz, R. Stevie Moore and Alphaville. In 2011 MGMT covered a Cleaners From Venus song on their We Hear of Love, of Youth, and of Disillusionment EP.

Since 2010, Newell has returned to making lo-fi, self-released music under the Cleaners from Venus moniker. In 2022, he formed the Light Music Company with former Dolly Mixture member Rachel Love.

== Filmography ==
Newell is the subject of Graham Bendel's 2019 documentary Upstairs Planet: Cleaners from Venus & the Universe of Martin Newell, the 2022 documentary The Jangling Man: The Martin Newell Story and the 2022 animated documentary short A Man for Our Time.

== Literary career ==
Newell is better known to some as a poet and author, and has been called "the greatest living English poet" by Will Self. Newell has released several volumes of poetry (often in collaboration with the illustrator James Dodds) and a memoir, This Little Ziggy, about his youth and his days in Plod. In 2007, he released a volume of reminiscences, anecdotes and historical information about his beloved Wivenhoe. He is also a weekly contributor of poetry to The Sunday Express, He now writes a weekly column for the East Anglian Daily Times (for which he won columnist of the year in the EDF/ East of England Media Awards in January 2010), performs annually at the Essex Book Festival and occasionally issues spoken word recordings of his poems.

== Personal life ==
Newell said that he has dyspraxia and Asperger syndrome.

Newell attended the Elliott School (now Ark Putney Academy) in Putney, southwest London, for two years as a teen. One of his classmates was future actor Pierce Brosnan (nicknamed "Irish"), and he alludes to "the next James Bond" in the 2022 song "Baby Space-Cakes", from the Cleaners from Venus album, That London.

== Discography ==
- Barricades and Angels (1980)
- Blow Away Your Troubles (1981)
- On Any Normal Monday (1982)
- Midnight Cleaners (1982)
- In the Golden Autumn (1983)
- Under Wartime Conditions (1984)
- Songs for a Fallow Land (1985)
- Living with Victoria Grey (1986)
- Going to England (1987)
- Town & Country (1988)
- The Brotherhood of Lizards (1988)
- Lizardland (1989)
- Number Thirteen (1990)
- The Greatest Living Englishman (1993)
- The Off White Album (1995)
- The Spirit Cage (2000)
- Radio Autumn Attic (2002)
- The Light Programme (2004)
- A Summer Tamarind (2007)
- English Electric (2010)
- In Chimp World (2011)
- The Late District (2013)
- Return to Bohemia (2014)
- Rose of the Lanes (2015)
- The Last Boy in the Locarno (2016)
- Star Cafe (2018)
- Life in a Time Machine (2018)
- Dolly Birds & Spies (2020)
- Penny Novelettes (2021)
- That London (2022)
- K7 (2023)
- Lilli Bolero (2024)
- Beryl & Ruff Go Shopping (2026)

== Bibliography ==
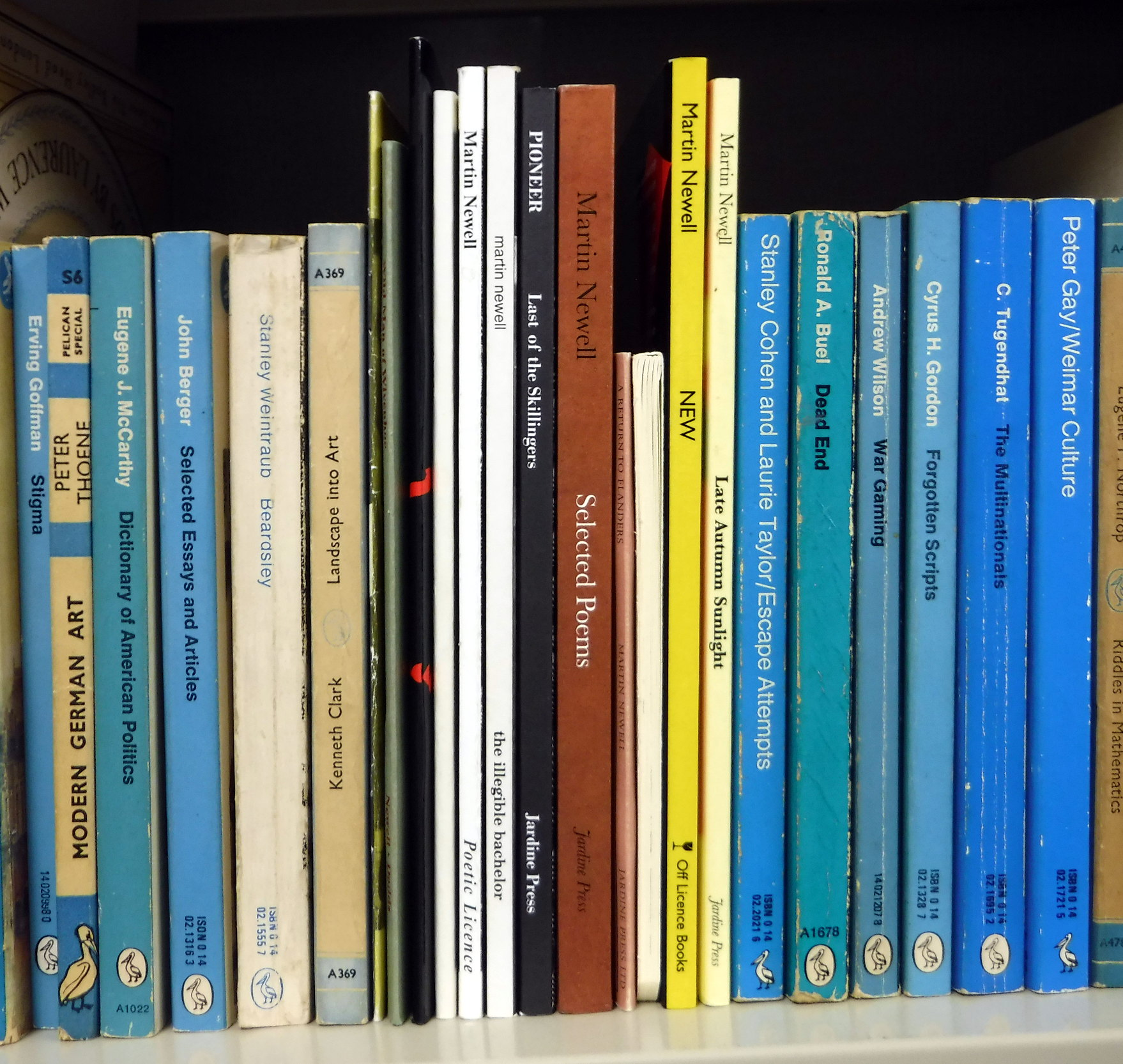
Martin Newell's collections (from left to right): I Hank Marvinned, Wild Man of Wivenhoe, Black Shuck, Under Milk Float, Poetic Licence, The Illegible Bachelor, Pioneer: Last of the Skillingers, Selected Poems, A Return to Flanders, Spoke 'n' Word, New, Late Autumn Sunlight (flanked by irrelevant Pelicans)

=== Books ===
- I Hank Marvinned... ("Martin Newell, c/o The Essex Festival, Department of Literature, University of Essex"; no publisher stated.) 1991.) 16-page booklet of poems. OCLC 505070831.
- Under Milk Float. Colchester: The Greyhound Press, 1992. Illustrated by Barry Woodcock. ISBN 0-9519100-0-0. 60-page book of poems
- The Illegible Bachelor. Colchester: Festival Books, 1996. ISBN 0-9519100-5-1. Poems
- Poetic Licence: The Best of 1990–1996. Ipswich: Jardine Press, 1996. ISBN 0-9525594-2-0. Poems
- Wild Man of Wivenhoe. [Wivenhoe:] Jardine Press, 1996. Illustrated by James Dodds. ISBN 0-9525594-3-9 Long poem
- New Top Poetry. Off Licence Books, 1999. ISBN 1-85215-078-5. Poems
- Black Shuck: The Ghost Dog of Eastern England. Hadleigh: Jardine Press, 1999. Illustrated by James Dodds. ISBN 0-9525594-8-X. Long poem
- Late Autumn Sunlight: East Anglian Verses. [Wivenhoe:] Jardine Press, 2001. Illustrated by James Dodds. ISBN 0-9539472-3-8.
  - 2nd edition. [Wivenhoe:] Jardine Press, 2007. ISBN 978-0-9552035-4-1.
- This Little Ziggy. Thirsk, North Yorkshire: House of Stratus, 2001. ISBN 0-7551-0267-3. Memoir
  - 2nd edition. [Wivenhoe:] Wiven Books, 2008. ISBN 9780955731310.
- The Song of the Waterlily: The Building of a Boat. Jardine Press, 2003. Illustrated by James Dodds. ISBN 0-9539472-4-6. Long poem
- Return to Flanders. Jardine Press, 2004. Illustrated by Andrew Dodds. ISBN 0-9539472-8-9. Long poem.
- Spoke 'n' Word. Jardine Press, 2006. Illustrated by Charlotte Bernays. ISBN 0-9552035-0-3. 19 poems about Essex. Supposedly inspired by bicycle rides in the county.
- A Prospect of Wivenhoe. Snapshots of an English Town. Wiven Books 2007. ISBN 0-9557313-0-5.
- Selected Poems. Wivenhoe: Jardine Press 2008. With a foreword by Germaine Greer. ISBN 978-0-9552035-6-5.
- Horses Seen Through Trees. Wivenhoe: Wivenhoe Bookshop, 2010. ISBN 9780955731358. Illustrated by Charlotte Bernays, foreword by Andrew Phillips.
- The Stars on a Tray: Martin Newell's Saturday Columns. Autumn Girl, 2011. ISBN 9780957039506. From the "Joy of Essex" column in the East Anglian Daily Times.
- The Green Children. Wivenhoe: Jardine Press, 2015. ISBN 978-0-9926877-8-6. 18-page booklet.
- Wife of '55. Bungay, Suffolk: Nasty Little Press, 2015. ISBN 9780957300071. Poems
- The Greatest Living Englishman. Autumn Girl, 2019. ISBN 9780957039513. Memoir
- The Home Recording Handbook. Wivenhoe: Dunlin Press, 2025. ISBN 9781739403850. Memoir

=== Contributions ===
- Pioneer: Last of the Skillingers (One poem, "The Ballad of the Pioneer".) 2002. ISBN 0-9539472-5-4 Revised and enlarged ed. Jardine Press, 2004. ISBN 0-9539472-7-0
- Shipshape 2001. ISBN 0-948252-10-3 (hardback) ISBN 0-948252-09-X (paperback)
- Est: Collected Reports from East Anglia. Dunlin Press, 2015. ISBN 9780993125904.
