= Dolly Mixture (band) =

English pop/punk band

- Origin: Cambridge, England
- Genres: Post-punk; pop punk
- Years active: 1978–1984; 2013
- Labels: Chrysalis, Respond, Dead Good Dollys Platters, Cordelia, Royal Mint
- Past members: Rachel Bor; Hester Smith; Debsey Wykes
- Website: www.dollymixture.net

Dolly Mixture were an English rock band, formed in 1978 by the bassist and vocalist Debsey Wykes, guitarist and vocalist Rachel Bor, and drummer Hester Smith. They had a taste of success with a UK No. 1 hit backing Captain Sensible on his 1982 cover of "Happy Talk", a top 10 hit with Sensible on "Glad It's All Over" in 1984, and a top 40 hit performing backing vocals for the Captain Sensible song "Wot" in 1982.

== Career ==
=== Early years ===
The group was formed in Cambridge, England, by Bor, Smith and Wykes, three school friends who shared a fondness for the Shangri-Las and the Undertones. Dolly Mixture supported the Undertones on one of their first UK tours. The band also played venues with the Fall and the Transmitters in 1979. They were once supported by U2. In Autumn 1981, they toured as the featured support band for Bad Manners on their Gosh It's tour.

Relocating to London to gig, national BBC Radio 1 DJ John Peel gave them exposure on his radio show and in his weekly column in the UK pop paper, Sounds. Signed to Chrysalis Records, the group released a cover of the Shirelles hit, "Baby It's You" (1980), produced by Eric Faulkner of the Bay City Rollers. However, the cover version was disowned by the group, which protested the label's attempt to sell them as a teen girl group. Their next single, "Been Teen" (1981), was the first single released on Paul Weller's Respond label. It was followed by "Everything and More" (1982), also released on Respond. Both singles were produced by Captain Sensible and Paul Gray of the Damned. They became friends with Sensible and recorded backing vocals on his singles and albums. Sensible had a hit with "Happy Talk" in 1982 featuring Dolly Mixture, (credited as "Dolly Mixtures"), and they also appeared in the song's video and on Top of the Pops. Rachel Bor also featured on the Animus/Loose Records single "Wot NO Meat?" by Captain Sensible in 1985.

=== Dolly's "Demonstration Tapes" ===
In 1984, the band released a double album called the Demonstration Tapes on their own Dead Good Dolly Platters label. The album sported a plain white cover and each copy was numbered and autographed by the group members. One thousand copies were pressed. The album featured 27 demo tracks which covered a large part of the band's repertoire.

The same year saw a release of the "Remember This" single, again on Dead Good Dolly Platters label. The B-side was a piece entitled "Listening Pleasure/Borinda's Lament", which included dialogue (à la Home Service British Force's Radio DJ), a half-finished song and an instrumental chamber piece with Wykes on piano and Bor on cello.

=== Fireside EP and the end of Dolly Mixture ===
The 12-inch vinyl Fireside EP was released in 1984 on Cordelia Records, owned by Alan Jenkins, a member of the Deep Freeze Mice. The six-track EP represented the band's new artistic direction and contained mostly instrumental pieces, abandoning the guitar/bass/drum format with piano and strings. The most recognisable track was "Dolly Medley", containing highlights of the Dolly's repertoire, including the previously unreleased "Dead Rainbow", all done in a chamber music style. It was produced by Dolly Mixture and Andrew Fryer.

The trio dissolved as a working band in 1984.

=== Reunions and reissues ===
In 1995, Saint Etienne member Bob Stanley re-released the Demonstration Tapes album on his short-lived Royal Mint label. In 1998, the Japanese musician Cornelius released the "Dreamism!" single in Japan on his Trattoria label. The single collected one previously unreleased song ("My Rainbow Valley") plus three alternate versions of previously released songs.

In 2010, Dolly Mixture released a three CD box set including the Demonstration Tapes album, all of the band's singles plus a complete disc of additional demos and live recordings, many of which are available for the first time. The box set was a limited edition only and features 56 re-mastered recordings and a 32-page booklet. A vinyl double-LP was reissued by London-based label Germs of Youth to coincide with the box set. It is an exact copy of the 1984 release (limited to 300 copies), hand stamped with the original stamp and signed/numbered by the band.

Bor and Wykes performed together on 24 April 2013 at the Islington Assembly Hall in London, supporting Veronica Falls. In 2019, the LP Other Music was released by Sealed Records, a sublabel of La Vida Es Un Mus. It is a compilation of alternate versions and other recordings by the band, released as limited vinyl and streaming.

== Other projects ==
Wykes and Smith resurfaced with the group Coming Up Roses, which featured more melodic dance-pop. With Wykes and Smith, the early line-up comprised ex-Shillelagh Sisters member Patricia O'Flynn (saxophone), Leigh Luscious (guitar), and ex-Amazulu member Claire Kenny (bass). The latter three members were replaced by Jane Keay, Tony Watts, and Midus respectively. In 1989, Coming Up Roses released a six-track mini-album, I Said Ballroom, on Utility Records. All songs were written by Wykes and Smith. The first Coming Up Roses gig was at The White Swan in Brixton on 29 November (as part of the Send a Volunteer to Nicaragua benefit), and the last performance was at Up the Creek in Greenwich.

Meanwhile, Wykes started collaborating with Saint Etienne as one of the band's regular backing singers; she has continued in this role, appearing with the band on its tour for the 2017 album Home Counties. Saint Etienne's Bob Stanley became the new Dolly Mixture champion, re-releasing their untitled 1984 double album (this time titled Demonstration Tapes) as a single CD on the Royal Mint label in 1995. Together with Saint Etienne's Paul Kelly, Wykes went on to form indie-chamber-pop band Birdie, which released the albums Some Dusty (1999), Triple Echo (2001) and Reverb Deluxe (2003).

Rachel Love (nee Bor) played in a band called Fruit Machine until 1999. In 2021, she released her first solo album Picture in Mind , produced by her husband Steve Lovell. Going on also to form The Light Music Company with Martin Newell the following year. She continues to play gigs as Rachel Love, with her sons forming part of a backing band, releasing a second album Lyra in 2024. In 2025, Love was part of the formation of Railcard, also featuring Ian Button of Thrashing Doves, Peter Momtchiloff of Heavenly and Talulah Gosh, and Allison Thomson. The band is signed to the label Skepwax, founded by Amelia Fletcher and Rob Pursey of Heavenly.

== Discography ==
Albums
Title	Release date	Label	Catalog No.
Demonstration Tapes	1984	Dead Good Dolly Platters; Reissued in 1995 on Royal Mint Records	DMLP 1 RM 01 CD

EPs
Title	Release date	Label	Catalog No.	
Fireside	1984	Cordelia Records	ERICAT 017	12-inch EP

Singles
Title	Release date	Label	Catalog No.
"Baby It's You"	1980	Chrysalis	CHS 2459
"Been Teen"	1981	Respond	RESP 1
"Everything And More"	1982	Respond	RESP 4
"Remember This"	1983	Dead Good Dolly Platters	DMS 1

Other releases
Title	Release date	Label	Catalog No.	
The Cricket	1983	Pavilioned in Splendour	PiS 1	7-inch EP by Perry Pavilion featuring Captain Sensible and Dolly Mixture
Dreamism!	1998	Trattoria	MENU 156	CD Maxi-Single
Everything and More	2010	Self-released	DMBOX1	3XCD - demo tapes, singles, additional material
Remember This: The Singles Collection 1980-1984	2011	For Us	FU043	singles compilation
Other Music	2019	Sealed Records	SEAL 005	compilation
