= Bad Manners discography =

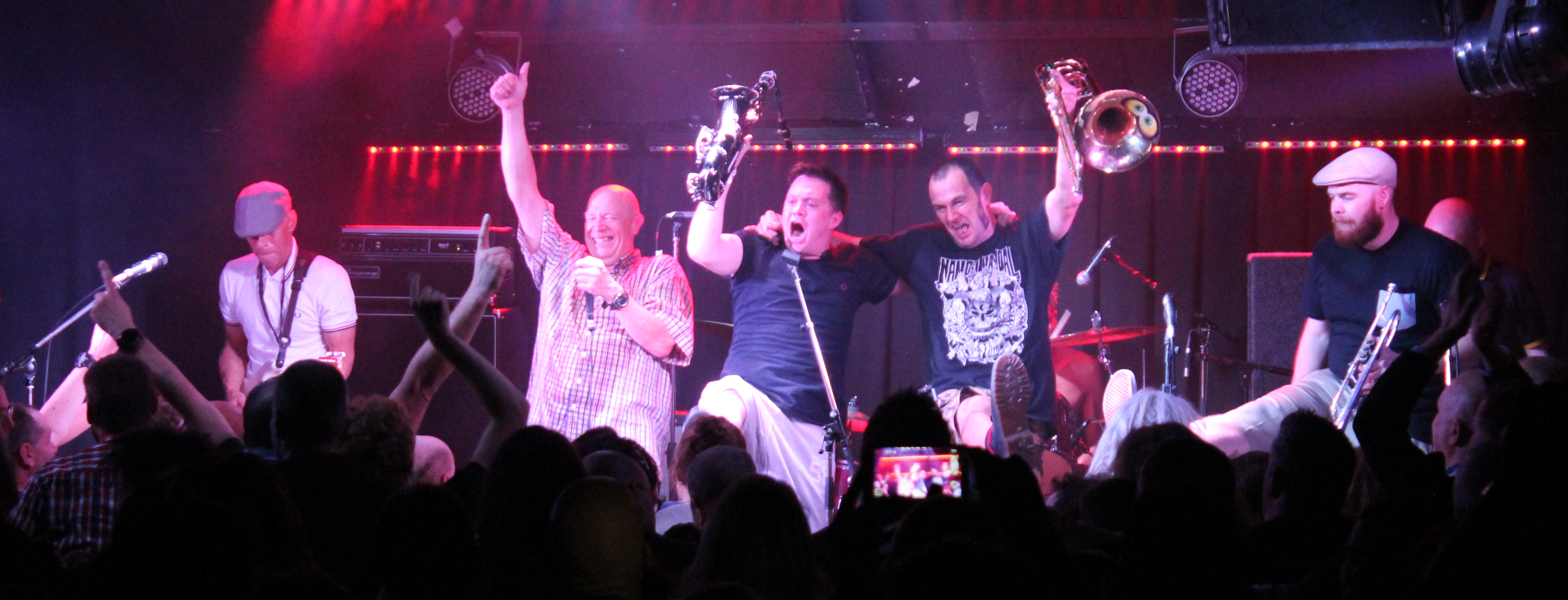
- Bad Manners performing at Bodega in Wellington, New Zealand, 2015
- Studio albums: 9
- EPs: 2
- Live albums: 5
- Compilation albums: 16
- Singles: 25
- Video albums: 1

This is the discography of British 2-tone/ska band Bad Manners.

== Albums ==
=== Studio albums ===
Title	Album details	Peak chart positions			Certifications
Title	Album details	UK	FIN	NZ	Certifications
Ska 'n' B	Released: 11 April 1980; Label: Magnet; Formats: LP, MC	34	21	28	UK: Silver
Loonee Tunes!	Released: November 1980; Label: Magnet; Formats: LP, MC	36	—	—	UK: Silver
Gosh It's ... Bad Manners	Released: 9 October 1981; Label: Magnet; Formats: LP, MC	18	—	—	UK: Silver
Forging Ahead	Released: November 1982; Label: Magnet; Formats: LP, MC	78	—	—	
Mental Notes	Released: October 1985; Label: Portrait; Formats: LP, MC	—	—	—	
Return of the Ugly	Released: 14 August 1989; Label: Blue Beat; Formats: CD, LP, MC	—	—	—	
Fat Sound	Released: 1992; Label: Pork Pie, Triple X; Formats: CD, LP, MC	—	—	—	
Don't Knock the Baldhead!	Released: 4 November 1997; Label: Pork Pie; Formats: CD, LP, MC; Also released as Heavy Petting	—	—	—	
Stupidity	Released: 2001; Label: Bad; Formats: CD, LP	—	—	—	
"—" denotes releases that did not chart or were not released in that territory.

=== Live albums ===
Title	Album details
Live and Loud!!	Released: 21 December 1987; Label: Link; Formats: LP; Reissued as Greatest Hits Live
Inner London Violence	Released: 1994; Label: Lagoon; Formats: CD; France-only release
Don't Knock the Baldhead: Live	Released: November 1997; Label: Receiver; Formats: CD
Can Can	Released: 2006; Label: Secret; Formats: CD
Baldheads Live in Essex	Released: May 2018; Label: Secret; Formats: CD+DVD, digital download

=== Compilation albums ===
Title	Album details	Peak chart positions
Title	Album details	UK
Bad Manners	Released: July 1981; Label: MCA; Formats: LP, MC; US and Canada-only release	—
The Height of Bad Manners	Released: April 1983; Label: Telstar; Formats: LP, MC	23
Klass	Released: May 1983; Label: MCA; Formats: LP, MC; US-only release	—
Eat the Beat	Released: 1988; Label: Blue Beat, Squale; Formats: CD, LP, MC	—
This Is Ska!	Released: 1996; Label: Dojo; Formats: CD	—
Viva la Ska Revolution	Released: May 1997; Label: Recall 2cd; Formats: 2xCD	—
Can Can	Released: 1997; Label: Hay May; Formats: CD, MC	—
Rare	Released: 1997; Label: T-Leaf; Formats: CD, LP	—
The Collection	Released: 10 March 1998; Label: Cult; Formats: CD; US-only release	—
Anthology	Released: October 1999; Label: Eagle; Formats: 2xCD	—
Special Brew	Released: April 2000; Label: Hay May; Formats: CD	—
Magnetism: The Best of Bad Manners	Released: 13 November 2000; Label: Warner Music; Formats: CD	200
Oi... Our Greatest Hits	Released: 2003; Label: Blitz; Formats: CD	—
Walking in the Sunshine: The Best Of	Released: May 2008; Label: Music Club Deluxe; Formats: 2xCD	—
The Very Best of Bad Manners	Released: 17 July 2015; Label: Rhino/Magnet; Formats: CD, digital download	—
The Albums 1980–85	Released: 24 August 2018; Label: Pressure Drop; Formats: 5xCD box set	—
"—" denotes releases that did not chart.

=== Video albums ===
Title	Album details
Live in Concert – Don't Knock the Bald Heads	Released: 2005; Label: Secret Films; Formats: DVD

== EPs ==
Title	Album details	Peak chart positions	
Title	Album details	UK	IRE
Special "R'n'B" Party Four E.P.	Released: November 1981; Label: Magnet; Formats: 7"	34	22
Fatty England vs Nutty Japan	Released: 2000; Label: Diwphalanx; Formats: CD, 12"; Split EP with Oi-Skall Mates; Japan-only release	—	—
"—" denotes releases that did not chart or were not released in that territory.

== Singles ==
Title	Year	Peak chart positions							Certifications	Albums
Title	Year	UK	AUS	BE (FL)	FIN	IRE	NL	NZ	Certifications	Albums
"Ne-Ne Na-Na Na-Na Nu-Nu"	1980	28	—	—	—	—	—	—		Ska 'n' B
"Lip Up Fatty"	1980	15	—	—	—	—	—	—		Ska 'n' B
"Special Brew"	1980	3	—	—	—	4	—	—	UK: Silver	Ska 'n' B
"Lorraine"	1980	21	—	—	—	21	—	28		Loonee Tunes!
"Just a Feeling"	1981	13	—	—	—	9	—	—		Loonee Tunes!
"Tequila" (Netherlands-only release)	1981	—	—	—	—	—	—	—		Loonee Tunes!
"Can Can"	1981	3	76	13	14	15	11	—	UK: Silver	Gosh It's ... Bad Manners
"Walking in the Sunshine"	1981	10	—	—	—	11	—	—		Gosh It's ... Bad Manners
"Buona Sera"	1981	34	—	—	—	—	—	—	—	Special 'R 'n' B' Party Four E.P. Featuring Buona Sera
"Got No Brains"	1982	44	—	—	—	—	—	—		Forging Ahead
"My Girl Lollipop (My Boy Lollipop)"	1982	9	—	—	28	5	—	—		Forging Ahead
"Samson and Delilah"	1982	58	—	—	—	—	—	—		Forging Ahead
"That'll Do Nicely"	1983	49	—	—	—	—	—	—		Forging Ahead
"Blue Summer"	1985	—	—	—	—	—	—	—		Mental Notes
"What the Papers Say"	1985	—	—	—	—	—	—	—		Mental Notes
"Bang the Drum All Day" (US 12"-only release)	1985	—	—	—	—	—	—	—		Mental Notes
"Tossin' in My Sleep"	1986	—	—	—	—	—	—	—		Mental Notes
"Pipeline" (France-only release)	1988	—	—	—	—	—	—	—		Eat the Beat
"Since You've Gone Away" (France-only release)	1988	—	—	—	—	—	—	—		Eat the Beat
"Skaville UK"	1989	87	—	—	—	—	—	—		Return of the Ugly
"Sally Brown"	1989	—	—	—	—	—	—	—		Return of the Ugly
"Gonna Get Along Without You Now"	1989	—	—	—	—	—	—	—		Non-album singles
"Christmas Time Again"	1989	—	—	—	—	—	—	—		Non-album singles
"Millennium Knees Up"	1999	—	—	—	—	—	—	—		Non-album singles
"You're Just Too Good to Be True, Can't Take My Eyes Off You" (Japan-only release)	2011	—	—	—	—	—	—	—		Non-album singles
"What Simon Says"	2012	—	—	—	—	—	—	—		Non-album singles
"—" denotes releases that did not chart or were not released in that territory.
