= List of UK top-ten singles in 1981 =

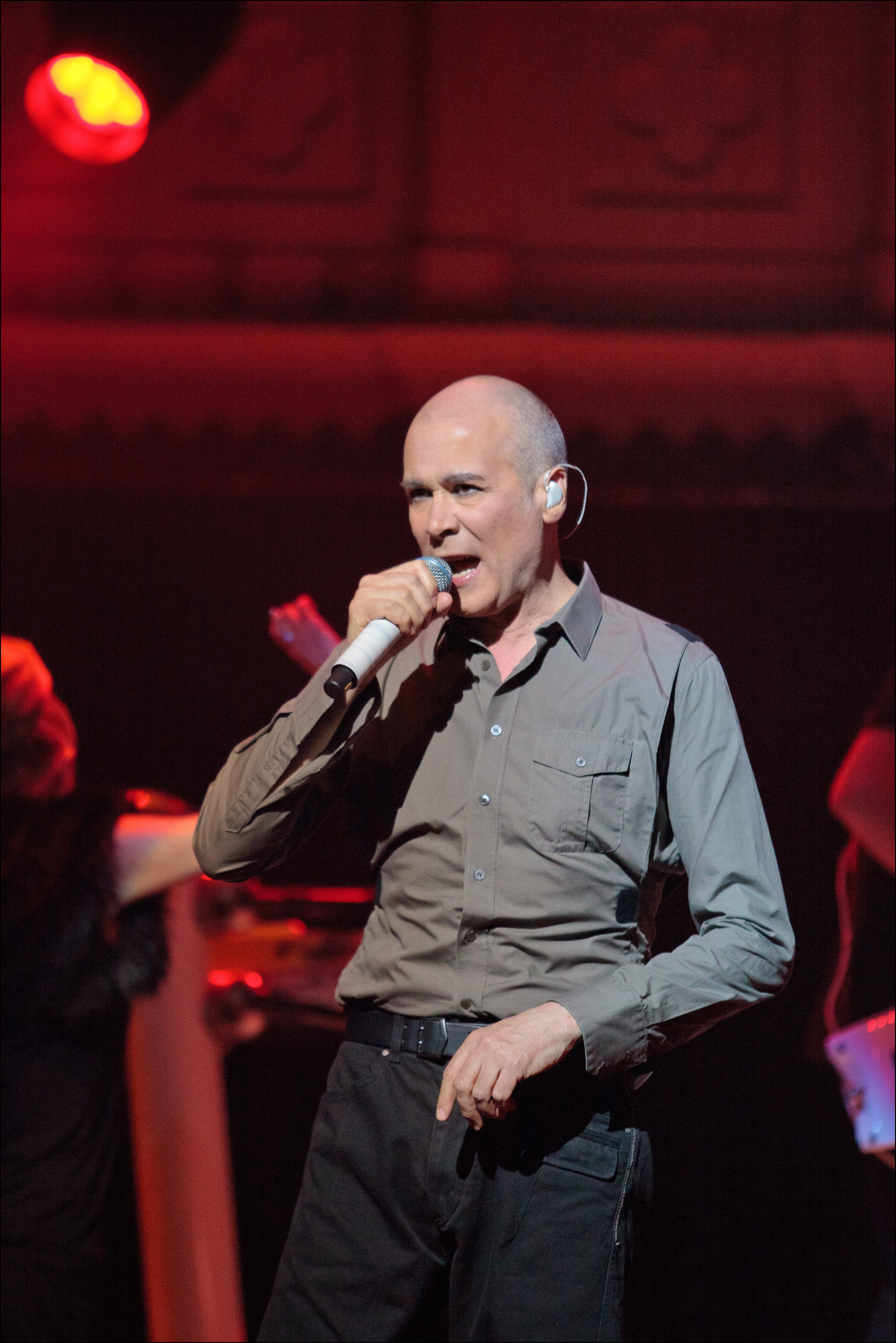
Philip Oakey (pictured in 2011) and his band The Human League had the best-selling single of 1981 with "Don't You Want Me", which spent five weeks at number-one and also became the year's Christmas number-one single. The group had two other singles in the top 10 this year.

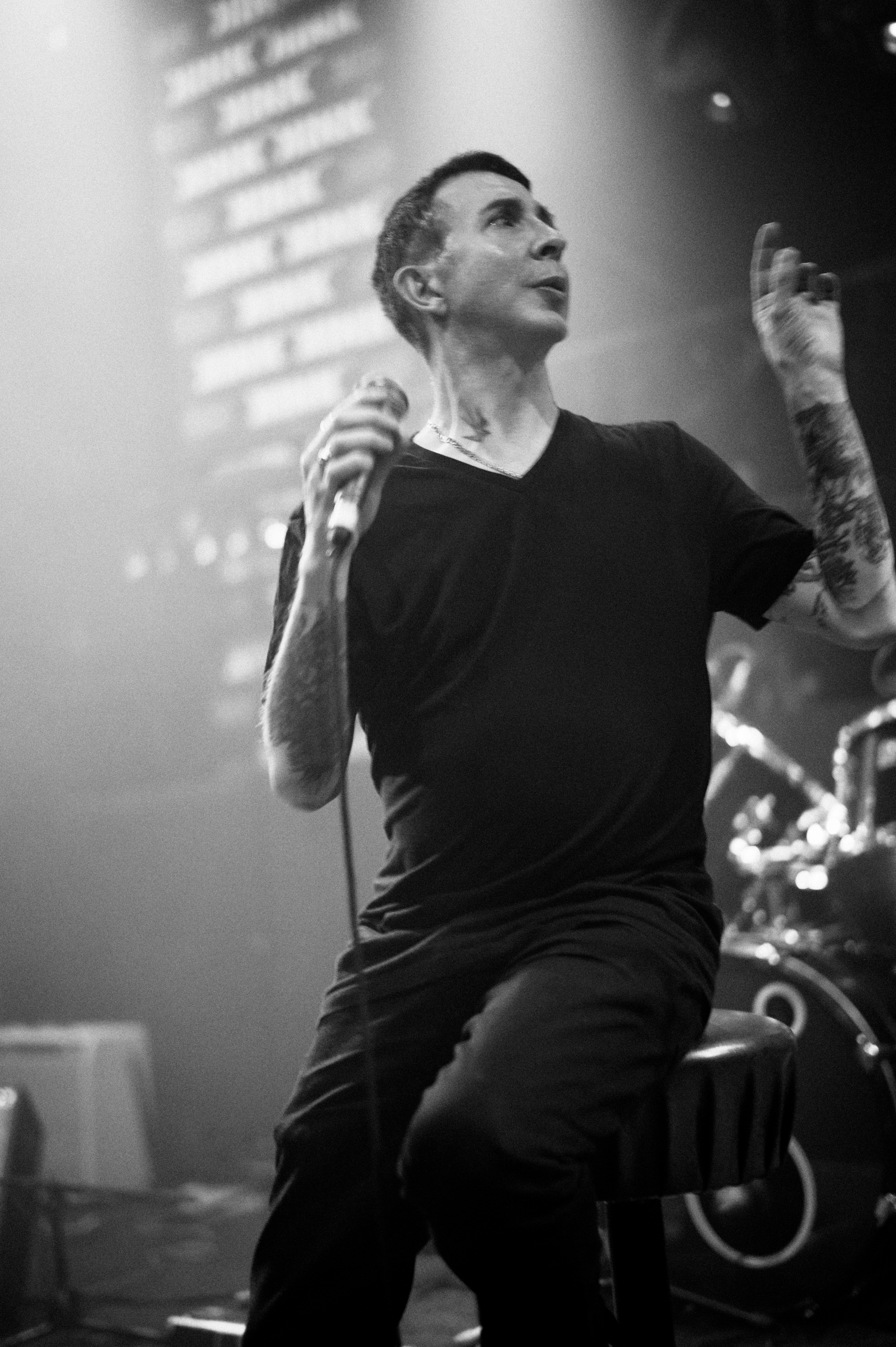
Soft Cell (lead singer Marc Almond pictured in 2010) secured two top 10 singles this year, including "Tainted Love", which spent two weeks at number-one and became the second best selling single of the year.

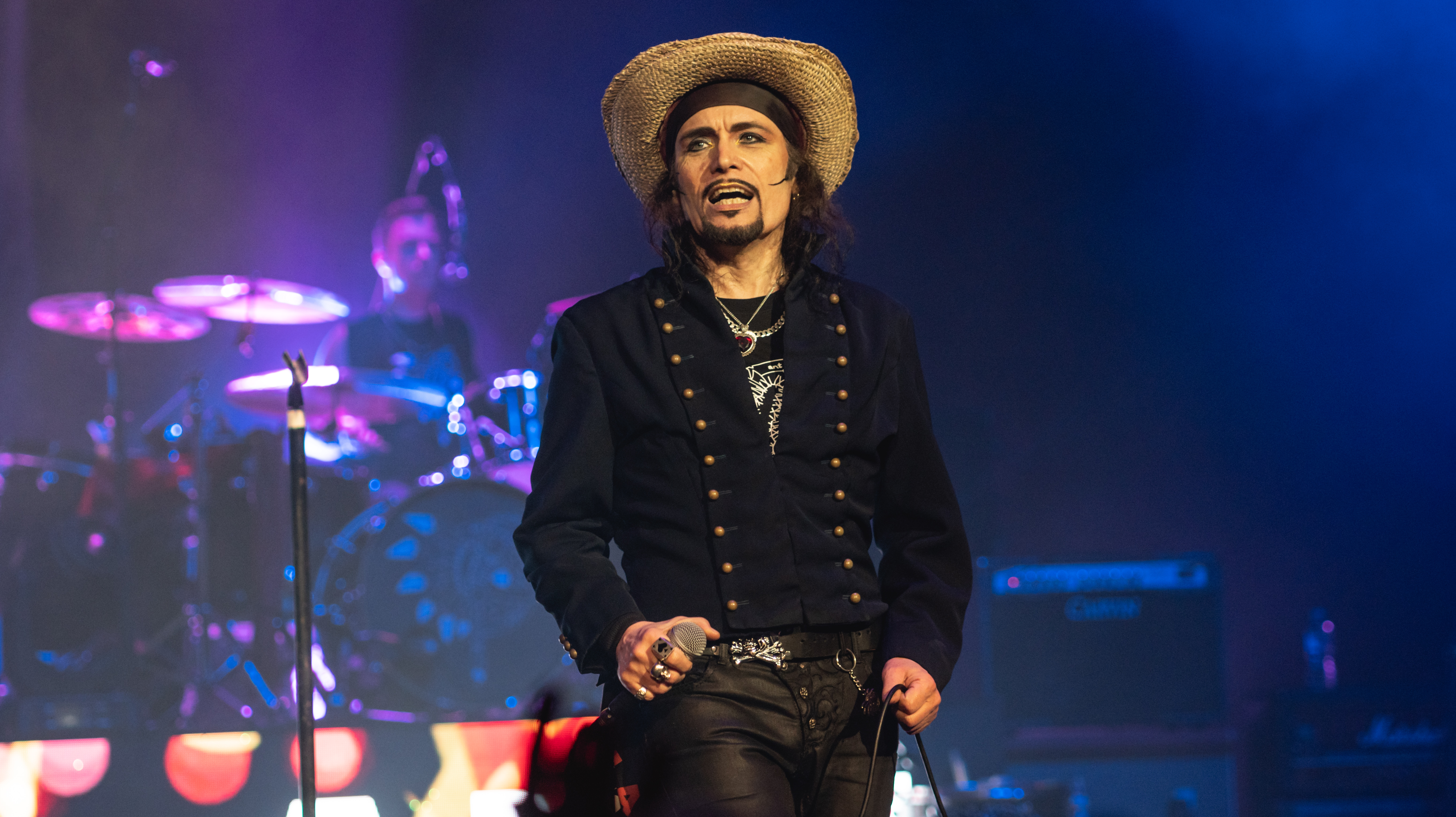
Adam and the Ants (lead singer Adam Ant pictured in 2019) had six top 10 singles in 1981, the most of any artist this year. Two of these reached number-one: "Stand and Deliver" and "Prince Charming", which became the third and fourth best selling singles of the year respectively.

The UK Singles Chart is one of many music charts compiled by the Official Charts Company that calculates the best-selling singles of the week in the United Kingdom. Before 2004, the chart was only based on the sales of physical singles. This list shows singles that peaked in the Top 10 of the UK Singles Chart during 1981, as well as singles which peaked in 1980 and 1982 but were in the top 10 in 1981. The entry date is when the single appeared in the top 10 for the first time (week ending, as published by the Official Charts Company, which is six days after the chart is announced).

One-hundred and forty-five singles were in the top ten in 1981. Ten singles from 1980 remained in the top 10 for several weeks at the beginning of the year, while "Ant Rap" by Adam and the Ants, "I'll Find My Way Home" by Jon and Vangelis, "It Must Be Love" by Madness, "The Land of Make Believe" by Bucks Fizz and "Mirror Mirror (Mon Amour)" by Dollar were released in 1981 but did not reach their peak until 1982. "Antmusic" by Adam and the Ants, "Happy Xmas (War is Over)" by John Lennon, Yoko Ono, the Plastic Ono Band with the Harlem Community Center Choir and "Imagine" by John Lennon were the singles from 1980 to reach their peak in 1981. Thirty artists scored multiple entries in the top 10 in 1981. Duran Duran, The Human League, Kim Wilde, Shakin' Stevens and Ultravox were among the many artists who achieved their first UK charting top 10 single in 1981.

The 1980 Christmas number-one, "There's No One Quite Like Grandma" by St. Winifred's School Choir, remained at number-one for the first week of 1981. The first new number-one single of the year was "Imagine" by the late former Beatles singer John Lennon. Overall, twenty different singles peaked at number-one in 1981, with Adam and the Ants, John Lennon and Shakin' Stevens (2) having the joint most singles hit that position.

== Background ==
=== Multiple entries ===
One-hundred and forty-five singles charted in the top 10 in 1981, with one-hundred and thirty-three singles reaching their peak this year.

Thirty artists scored multiple entries in the top 10 in 1981. Adam and the Ants secured the record for most top 10 hits in 1981 with six hit singles.

Soft Cell were one of a number of artists with two top-ten entries, including the number-one single "Tainted Love". Bucks Fizz, Diana Ross, Kim Wilde, Queen and Ultravox were among the other artists who had multiple top 10 entries in 1981.

=== Chart debuts ===
Forty-eight artists achieved their first top 10 single in 1981, either as a lead or featured artist. Of these, six went on to record another hit single that year: Bucks Fizz, Chas & Dave, Kim Wilde, Soft Cell, Starsound and Ultravox. The Human League and Toyah both had two more entries in 1981. Shakin' Stevens had three other entries in his breakthrough year.

The following table (collapsed on desktop site) does not include acts who had previously charted as part of a group and secured their first top 10 solo single.

Artist	Number of top 10s	First entry	Chart position	Other entries
Chas & Dave	2	"Rabbit"	8	"Ossie's Dream (Spurs Are on Their Way to Wembley)" (5)
The Look	1	"I Am the Beat"	6	—
Yarbrough and Peoples	1	"Don't Stop the Music"	7	—
Ultravox	2	"Vienna"	2	"All Stood Still" (8)
Visage	1	"Fade to Grey"	8	—
Joe Dolce Music Theatre	1	"Shaddap You Face"	1	—
Fred Wedlock	1	"The Oldest Swinger in Town"	6	—
Girlschool	1	"St. Valentine's Day Massacre (EP)"	5	—
Headgirl	1	"St. Valentine's Day Massacre (EP)"	5	—
Coast to Coast	1	"(Do) The Hucklebuck"	5	—
Freeez	1	"Southern Freeez"	8	—
Kim Wilde	2	"Kids in America"	2	"Chequered Love" (4)
Shakin' Stevens	4	"This Ole House"	1	"You Drive Me Crazy" (2), "Green Door" (1), "It's Raining" (10)
The Teardrop Explodes	1	"Reward"	6	—
Toyah	3	"Four from Toyah (EP)"	4	"I Want to Be Free" (8), "Thunder in the Mountains" (4)
Tony Capstick	1	"The Sheffield Grinder"/"Capstick Comes Home"	3	—
Carlton Main Frickley Colliery Band	1	"The Sheffield Grinder"/"Capstick Comes Home"	3	—
Bucks Fizz	2	"Making Your Mind Up"	1	"The Land of Make Believe" (1) ^{[A]}
Landscape	1	"Einstein a Go-Go"	5	—
Linx	1	"Intuition"	7	—
Ennio Morricone	1	"Chi mai"	2	—
Starsound	2	"Stars on 45"	2	"Stars on 45 Vol. 2" (2)
REO Speedwagon	1	"Keep On Loving You"	7	—
Tottenham Hotspur FA Cup Final Squad	1	"Ossie's Dream (Spurs Are on Their Way to Wembley)"	5	—
Kim Carnes	1	"Bette Davis Eyes"	10	—
Champaign	1	"How 'Bout Us"	5	—
Kate Robbins	1	"More Than in Love"	2	—
Beyond	1	"More Than in Love"	2	—
Red Sovine	1	"Teddy Bear"	4	—
Elaine Paige	1	"Memory"	6	—
Imagination	1	"Body Talk"	4	—
Tom Tom Club	1	"Wordy Rappinghood"	7	—
Royal Philharmonic Orchestra	1	"Hooked on Classics"	2	—
Tight Fit	1	"Back to the Sixties"	4	—
Duran Duran	1	"Girls on Film"	5	—
The Human League	3	"Love Action (I Believe in Love)"	3	"Don't You Want Me" (1), "Open Your Heart" (6)
Aneka	1	"Japanese Boy"	1	—
Soft Cell	2	"Tainted Love"	1	"Bedsitter" (4)
The Tweets	1	"The Birdie Song (Birdie Dance)"	2	—
The Pointer Sisters	1	"Slow Hand"	10	—
Dave Stewart	1	"It's My Party"	1	—
Barbara Gaskin	1	"It's My Party"	1	—
Depeche Mode	1	"Just Can't Get Enough"	8	—
Laurie Anderson	1	"O Superman"	2	—
Altered Images	1	"Happy Birthday"	2	—
Julio Iglesias	1	"Begin the Beguine (Volver a Empezar)"	1	—
Haircut One Hundred	1	"Favourite Shirts (Boy Meets Girl)"	4	—
Modern Romance	1	"Ay Ay Ay Ay Moosey"	10	—

Notes

Phil Collins had his first solo credit independent of Genesis with "In the Air Tonight", peaking at number two. Headgirl was a collaboration between Motörhead and Girlschool, the former having recorded a top 10 single previously, "The Golden Years (EP)", with the latter making their top ten debut.

Graham Bonnet's only top 10 single as a solo artist, "Night Games", reached number 6 in 1981. He had scored hit singles as a member of Rainbow and in the duo The Marbles with Trevor Gordon. Lionel Richie's official chart debut on his own came this year when "Endless Love" peaked at number 7. He had previously made an impression on the top 10 with the group Commodores.

Godley & Creme had scored top 10 hits in the 1970s as members of the groups Hotlegs and 10cc. They achieved their first top 10 as a duo in 1981 with "Under Your Thumb", which peaked at number three.

=== Songs from films ===
Original songs from various films entered the top 10 throughout the year. These included "Flash" (Flash Gordon), "Chi Mai" (The Professional) and "For Your Eyes Only" (For Your Eyes Only).

=== Best-selling singles ===
The Human League had the best-selling single of the year with "Don't You Want Me". The single spent nine weeks in the top 10 (including five weeks at number one), sold over 1.15 million copies and was certified platinum by the BPI. "Tainted Love" by Soft Cell came in second place, selling more than 1.04 million copies. Adam and the Ants' "Stand and Deliver", "Prince Charming" by Adam and the Ants and Shakin' Stevens' "This Ole House" made up the top five. Singles by Ultravox, Michael Jackson, Bucks Fizz, Joe Dolce Music Theatre and The Tweets were also in the top ten best-selling singles of the year.

== Top-ten singles ==
Key

Symbol	Meaning
‡	Single peaked in 1980 but still in chart in 1981.
♦	Single released in 1981 but peaked in 1982.
(#)	Year-end top-ten single position and rank
Entered	The date that the single first appeared in the chart.
Peak	Highest position that the single reached in the UK Singles Chart.

Entered (week ending)	Weeks in top 10	Single	Artist	Peak	Peak reached (week ending)	Weeks at peak
Singles in 1980
22 November 1980	8	"Super Trouper" ‡	ABBA	1	29 November 1980	3
29 November 1980	7	"(Just Like) Starting Over" ‡ ^{[B]}	John Lennon	1	20 December 1980	1
6 December 1980	6	"Embarrassment" ‡	Madness	4	6 December 1980	2
13 December 1980	5	"There's No One Quite Like Grandma" ‡	St Winifred's School Choir	1	27 December 1980	2
13 December 1980	6	"Stop the Cavalry" ‡	Jona Lewie	3	13 December 1980	5
13 December 1980	6	"De Do Do Do, De Da Da Da" ‡	The Police	5	20 December 1980	1
13 December 1980	4	"Runaway Boys" ‡	Stray Cats	9	20 December 1980	1
20 December 1980	9	"Antmusic"	Adam and the Ants	2	17 January 1981	2
27 December 1980	5	"Happy Xmas (War Is Over)" ^{[B]}	John Lennon, Yoko Ono & Plastic Ono Band with the Harlem Community Choir	2	10 January 1981	1
27 December 1980	8	"Imagine" ^{[B]}	John Lennon	1	10 January 1981	4
Singles in 1981
10 January 1981	3	"Flash"	Queen	10	10 January 1981	3
17 January 1981	2	"Do Nothing"/"Maggie's Farm"	The Specials	4	17 January 1981	1
17 January 1981	2	"Too Nice to Talk To"	The Beat	7	17 January 1981	2
17 January 1981	1	"Rabbit"	Chas & Dave	8	17 January 1981	1
24 January 1981	6	"Woman" ^{[C]}	John Lennon	1	7 February 1981	2
24 January 1981	5	"In the Air Tonight"	Phil Collins	2	7 February 1981	1
24 January 1981	3	"I Am the Beat"	The Look	6	24 January 1981	1
24 January 1981	3	"Don't Stop the Music"	Yarbrough and Peoples	7	31 January 1981	2
31 January 1981	3	"Rapture"	Blondie	5	31 January 1981	2
31 January 1981	8	"Vienna" (#6)	Ultravox	2	14 February 1981	4
31 January 1981	2	"Young Parisians"	Adam and the Ants	9	31 January 1981	2
31 January 1981	1	"I Ain't Gonna Stand for It"	Stevie Wonder	10	31 January 1981	1
7 February 1981	1	"Fade to Grey"	Visage	8	7 February 1981	1
14 February 1981	6	"Shaddap You Face" (#9)	Joe Dolce Music Theatre	1	21 February 1981	3
14 February 1981	4	"I Surrender"	Rainbow	3	28 February 1981	1
14 February 1981	3	"The Oldest Swinger in Town"	Fred Wedlock	6	21 February 1981	1
14 February 1981	4	"The Return of the Los Palmas 7"	Madness	7	21 February 1981	2
21 February 1981	1	"Romeo and Juliet"	Dire Straits	8	21 February 1981	1
21 February 1981	1	"Rock This Town"	Stray Cats	9	21 February 1981	1
21 February 1981	1	"We'll Bring the House Down"	Slade	10	21 February 1981	1
28 February 1981	3	"St. Valentine's Day Massacre (EP)"	Headgirl ^{[D]}	5	28 February 1981	2
28 February 1981	6	"Jealous Guy"	Roxy Music	1	14 March 1981	2
28 February 1981	6	"(Do) The Hucklebuck"	Coast to Coast	5	14 March 1981	2
28 February 1981	3	"Southern Freeez"	Freeez	8	7 March 1981	2
7 March 1981	4	"Kings of the Wild Frontier"	Adam and the Ants	2	14 March 1981	1
7 March 1981	2	"Something 'Bout You Baby I Like"	Status Quo	9	7 March 1981	2
14 March 1981	5	"Kids in America"	Kim Wilde	2	28 March 1981	2
14 March 1981	8	"This Ole House" (#5)	Shakin' Stevens	1	28 March 1981	3
21 March 1981	2	"Reward"	The Teardrop Explodes	6	21 March 1981	1
21 March 1981	4	"Four from Toyah (EP)"	Toyah	4	28 March 1981	1
21 March 1981	2	"You Better You Bet"	The Who	9	21 March 1981	2
28 March 1981	6	"Lately"	Stevie Wonder	3	11 April 1981	2
28 March 1981	3	"Capstick Comes Home"/"The Sheffield Grinder"	Tony Capstick & the Carlton Main Frickley Colliery Band	3	4 April 1981	1
4 April 1981	7	"Making Your Mind Up" (#8) ^{[E]}	Bucks Fizz	1	18 April 1981	3
4 April 1981	5	"Einstein a Go-Go"	Landscape	5	11 April 1981	2
4 April 1981	3	"Intuition"	Linx	7	11 April 1981	1
11 April 1981	3	"It's a Love Thing"	The Whispers	9	11 April 1981	3
11 April 1981	1	"D-Days"	Hazel O'Connor	10	11 April 1981	1
18 April 1981	6	"Chi mai" ^{[F]}	Ennio Morricone	2	25 April 1981	2
18 April 1981	3	"Night Games"	Graham Bonnet	6	18 April 1981	1
18 April 1981	4	"Good Thing Going"	Sugar Minott	4	25 April 1981	2
18 April 1981	4	"Can You Feel It"	The Jacksons	6	2 May 1981	1
25 April 1981	2	"Attention to Me" ^{[G]}	The Nolans	9	9 May 1981	1
2 May 1981	6	"Stars on 45"	Starsound ^{[H]}	2	9 May 1981	1
2 May 1981	4	"Grey Day"	Madness	4	16 May 1981	1
9 May 1981	7	"Stand and Deliver" (#3)	Adam and the Ants	1	9 May 1981	5
9 May 1981	7	"You Drive Me Crazy"	Shakin' Stevens	2	16 May 1981	4
9 May 1981	1	"Muscle Bound"/"Glow"	Spandau Ballet	10	9 May 1981	1
16 May 1981	3	"Keep On Loving You"	REO Speedwagon	7	16 May 1981	2
16 May 1981	3	"Ossie's Dream (Spurs Are on Their Way to Wembley)" ^{[I]}	Tottenham Hotspur FA Cup Final Squad ^{[J]}	5	23 May 1981	2
16 May 1981	4	"Chequered Love"	Kim Wilde	4	23 May 1981	2
16 May 1981	4	"Swords of a Thousand Men"	Tenpole Tudor	6	23 May 1981	2
23 May 1981	2	"Bette Davis Eyes"	Kim Carnes	10	23 May 1981	2
30 May 1981	7	"Being with You"	Smokey Robinson	1	13 June 1981	2
30 May 1981	3	"I Want to Be Free"	Toyah	8	6 June 1981	1
6 June 1981	2	"Funeral Pyre"	The Jam	4	6 June 1981	2
6 June 1981	5	"How 'Bout Us"	Champaign	5	20 June 1981	1
6 June 1981	4	"Will You?"	Hazel O'Connor	8	20 June 1981	1
13 June 1981	4	"More Than in Love"	Kate Robbins & Beyond	2	13 June 1981	1
13 June 1981	6	"One Day in Your Life" (#7)	Michael Jackson	1	27 June 1981	2
13 June 1981	6	"Going Back to My Roots"	Odyssey	4	4 July 1981	1
20 June 1981	3	"Teddy Bear"	Red Sovine	4	20 June 1981	2
20 June 1981	2	"All Stood Still"	Ultravox	8	27 June 1981	1
27 June 1981	7	"Ghost Town"	The Specials	1	11 July 1981	3
27 June 1981	4	"Memory"	Elaine Paige	6	4 July 1981	1
4 July 1981	6	"Can Can"	Bad Manners	3	4 July 1981	4
4 July 1981	5	"Body Talk"	Imagination	4	18 July 1981	1
11 July 1981	5	"Stars on 45 Vol. 2"	Starsound ^{[H]}	2	18 July 1981	2
11 July 1981	2	"No Woman, No Cry (Live)"	Bob Marley and the Wailers	8	18 July 1981	1
11 July 1981	3	"Wordy Rappinghood"	Tom Tom Club	7	18 July 1981	1
18 July 1981	2	"Motorhead (Live)"	Motörhead	6	18 July 1981	2
25 July 1981	4	"Chant No. 1 (I Don't Need This Pressure On)"	Spandau Ballet	3	1 August 1981	1
25 July 1981	2	"Lay All Your Love on Me"	ABBA	7	25 July 1981	1
25 July 1981	5	"Happy Birthday"	Stevie Wonder	2	8 August 1981	1
25 July 1981	2	"Dancing on the Floor (Hooked on Love)"	Third World	10	25 July 1981	2
1 August 1981	6	"Green Door"	Shakin' Stevens	1	1 August 1981	4
1 August 1981	6	"Hooked on Classics"	Royal Philharmonic Orchestra	2	15 August 1981	2
8 August 1981	2	"Walk Right Now"	The Jacksons	7	8 August 1981	1
8 August 1981	2	"For Your Eyes Only"	Sheena Easton	8	8 August 1981	1
8 August 1981	4	"Back to the Sixties"	Tight Fit	4	15 August 1981	1
15 August 1981	3	"Girls on Film"	Duran Duran	5	22 August 1981	1
15 August 1981	6	"Love Action (I Believe in Love)"	The Human League	3	22 August 1981	2
15 August 1981	6	"Hold On Tight"	Electric Light Orchestra	4	5 September 1981	1
22 August 1981	5	"Japanese Boy"	Aneka	1	29 August 1981	1
22 August 1981	7	"Tainted Love" (#2)	Soft Cell	1	5 September 1981	2
22 August 1981	3	"The Caribbean Disco Show"	Lobo	8	29 August 1981	1
29 August 1981	3	"One in Ten"	UB40	7	5 September 1981	1
5 September 1981	2	"She's Got Claws"	Gary Numan	6	5 September 1981	1
5 September 1981	1	"Abacab"	Genesis	9	5 September 1981	1
12 September 1981	6	"Prince Charming" (#4)	Adam and the Ants	1	19 September 1981	4
12 September 1981	3	"Wired for Sound"	Cliff Richard	4	12 September 1981	1
12 September 1981	2	"Start Me Up"	The Rolling Stones	7	12 September 1981	1
12 September 1981	5	"Souvenir"	Orchestral Manoeuvres in the Dark	3	19 September 1981	1
19 September 1981	5	"Hands Up (Give Me Your Heart)"	Ottawan	3	26 September 1981	2
19 September 1981	4	"Pretend"	Alvin Stardust	4	3 October 1981	1
26 September 1981	3	"Endless Love"	Diana Ross & Lionel Richie	7	26 September 1981	1
26 September 1981	7	"The Birdie Song (Birdie Dance)" (#10)	The Tweets	2	10 October 1981	2
26 September 1981	4	"Invisible Sun"	The Police	2	3 October 1981	1
26 September 1981	1	"Slow Hand"	The Pointer Sisters	10	26 September 1981	1
3 October 1981	4	"Under Your Thumb"	Godley & Creme	3	17 October 1981	1
3 October 1981	2	"Shut Up"	Madness	7	10 October 1981	1
10 October 1981	6	"It's My Party"	Dave Stewart with Barbara Gaskin	1	17 October 1981	4
17 October 1981	3	"Thunder in the Mountains"	Toyah	4	24 October 1981	1
17 October 1981	3	"Open Your Heart"	The Human League	6	17 October 1981	2
17 October 1981	1	"Just Can't Get Enough"	Depeche Mode	8	17 October 1981	1
17 October 1981	1	"Walkin' in the Sunshine"	Bad Manners	10	17 October 1981	1
24 October 1981	2	"O Superman"	Laurie Anderson	2	24 October 1981	1
24 October 1981	4	"Happy Birthday"	Altered Images	2	31 October 1981	3
24 October 1981	3	"Absolute Beginners"	The Jam	4	31 October 1981	1
24 October 1981	3	"A Good Year for the Roses"	Elvis Costello	6	7 November 1981	1
24 October 1981	2	"It's Raining"	Shakin' Stevens	10	24 October 1981	2
31 October 1981	5	"Every Little Thing She Does Is Magic"	The Police	1	14 November 1981	1
31 October 1981	4	"Labelled with Love"	Squeeze	4	7 November 1981	2
7 November 1981	3	"When She Was My Girl"	Four Tops	3	14 November 1981	1
7 November 1981	4	"Joan of Arc"	Orchestral Manoeuvres in the Dark	5	14 November 1981	2
14 November 1981	6	"Begin the Beguine (Volver a Empezar)"	Julio Iglesias	1	5 December 1981	1
14 November 1981	5	"Under Pressure"	Queen & David Bowie	1	21 November 1981	2
14 November 1981	4	"Favourite Shirts (Boy Meets Girl)"	Haircut One Hundred	4	21 November 1981	2
14 November 1981	2	"Tonight I'm Yours (Don't Hurt Me)"	Rod Stewart	8	21 November 1981	1
21 November 1981	2	"Physical"	Olivia Newton-John	7	21 November 1981	1
21 November 1981	4	"Let's Groove"	Earth, Wind & Fire	3	28 November 1981	2
28 November 1981	4	"Bedsitter"	Soft Cell	4	5 December 1981	1
28 November 1981	4	"Why Do Fools Fall in Love"	Diana Ross	4	12 December 1981	1
28 November 1981	2	"I Go to Sleep"	The Pretenders	7	5 December 1981	1
5 December 1981	6	"Daddy's Home"	Cliff Richard	2	12 December 1981	4
5 December 1981	8	"Don't You Want Me" (#1)	The Human League	1	12 December 1981	5
5 December 1981	1	"Ay Ay Ay Ay Moosey"	Modern Romance	10	5 December 1981	1
12 December 1981	6	"It Must Be Love" ♦	Madness	4	9 January 1982	1
12 December 1981	6	"Ant Rap" ♦	Adam and the Ants	3	9 January 1982	1
12 December 1981	4	"Wedding Bells"	Godley & Creme	7	26 December 1981	2
19 December 1981	5	"One of Us"	ABBA	3	19 December 1981	3
19 December 1981	9	"The Land of Make Believe" ♦	Bucks Fizz	1	16 January 1982	2
26 December 1981	6	"I'll Find My Way Home" ♦	Jon and Vangelis	6	23 January 1982	1
26 December 1981	2	"Rock 'n' Roll"	Status Quo	8	26 December 1981	2
26 December 1981	5	"Mirror Mirror" ♦	Dollar	4	16 January 1982	1

== Entries by artist ==
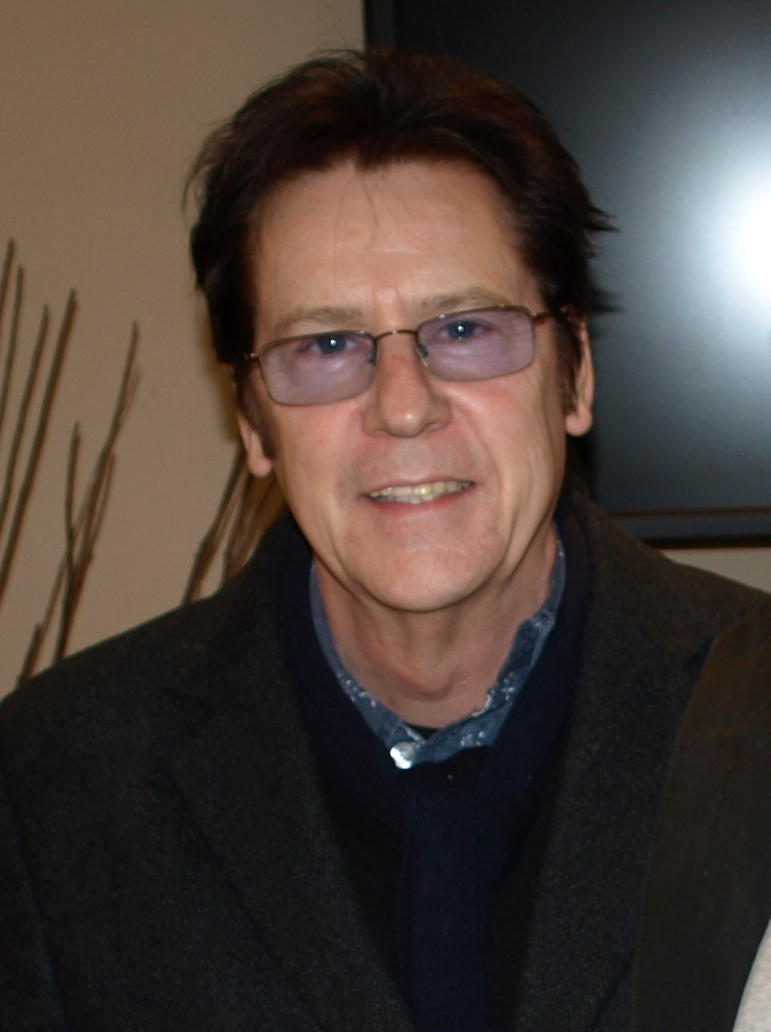
Shakin' Stevens (pictured in 2013) was one of the UK's most successful acts of this year, scoring four top 10 singles, including the number-one hits "This Ole House" and "Green Door".

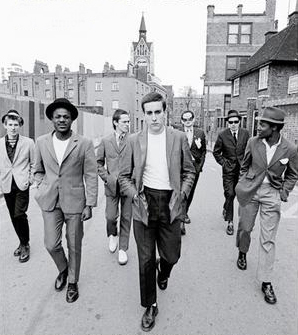
The Specials achieved two top 10 singles in 1981, including their biggest hit, the protest song "Ghost Town", which spent three weeks at the top of the chart in July. It was also the last single recorded by the original seven members of the group before their split later that year, with Specials bandmates Terry Hall, Lynval Golding and Neville Staple going on to form Fun Boy Three.

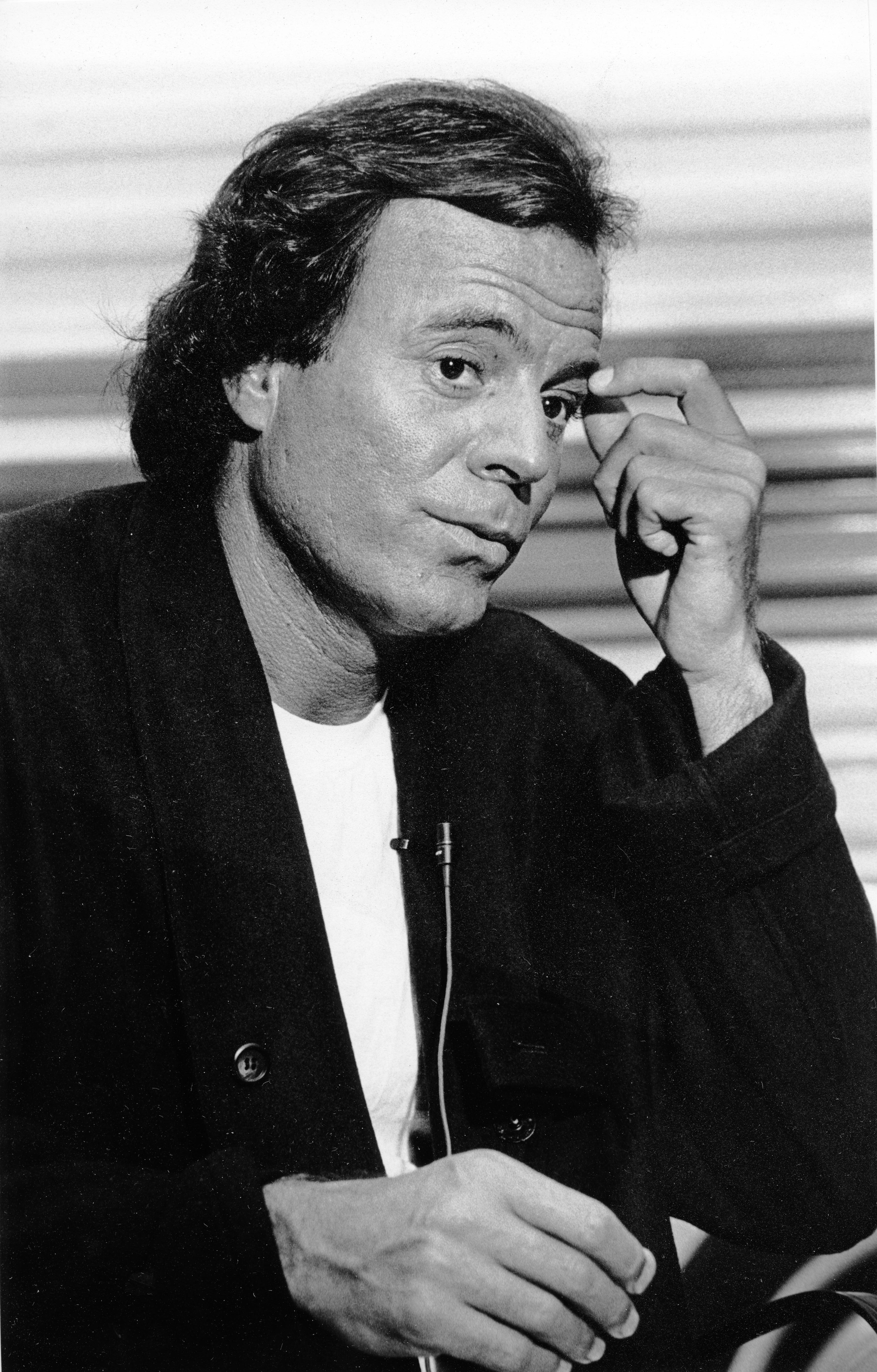
Julio Iglesias made the UK top 10 for the first time in November of this year with his cover version of "Begin the Beguine", which reached number-one for one week.

The following table shows artists who achieved two or more top 10 entries in 1981, including singles that reached their peak in 1980 or 1982. The figures include both main artists and featured artists, while appearances on ensemble charity records are also counted for each artist. The total number of weeks an artist spent in the top ten in 1981 is also shown.

Entries	Artist	Weeks	Singles
6	Adam and the Ants ^{[K]}^{[L]}	27	"Antmusic", "Ant Rap", "Kings of the Wild Frontier", "Prince Charming" "Stand and Deliver", "Young Parisians"
5	Madness ^{[L]}^{[M]}	15	"Embarrassment", "Grey Day", "It Must Be Love", "Shut Up", "The Return of the Los Palmas 7"
4	John Lennon ^{[K]}^{[M]}	9	"Happy Xmas (War is Over)", "Imagine", "(Just Like) Starting Over", "Woman"
4	Shakin' Stevens	23	"Green Door", "It's Raining", "This Ole House", "You Drive Me Crazy"
3	ABBA ^{[M]}	6	"Lay All Your Love on Me", "One of Us", "Super Trouper"
3	The Human League	13	"Don't You Want Me", "Love Action (I Believe in Love)", "Open Your Heart"
3	Michael Jackson	12	"Can You Feel It", "One Day in Your Life", "Walk Right Now"
3	The Police ^{[M]}	12	"De Do Do Do, De Da Da Da", "Every Little Thing She Does Is Magic", "Invisible Sun"
3	Stevie Wonder	12	"Happy Birthday", "I Ain't Gonna Stand for It", "Lately"
3	Toyah	10	"Four from Toyah (EP)", "I Want to Be Free", "Thunder in the Mountains"
2	Bad Manners	7	"Can Can", "Walkin' in the Sunshine"
2	Bucks Fizz ^{[L]}	9	"Making Your Mind Up", "The Land of Make Believe"
2	Chas & Dave ^{[N]}	4	"Ossie's Dream (Spurs Are on Their Way to Wembley)", "Rabbit"
2	Cliff Richard	7	"Daddy's Home", "Wired for Sound"
2	Diana Ross	7	"Endless Love", "Why Do Fools Fall in Love"
2	Godley & Creme	7	"Under Your Thumb", "Wedding Bells"
2	Hazel O'Connor	5	"D-Days", "Will You?"
2	The Jacksons	6	"Can You Feel It", "Walk Right Now"
2	The Jam	5	"Absolute Beginners", "Funeral Pyre"
2	Kim Wilde	9	"Chequered Love", "Kids in America"
2	Motörhead ^{[O]}	5	"Motorhead (Live)", "St. Valentine's Day Massacre (EP)"
2	Orchestral Manoeuvres in the Dark	9	"Joan of Arc", "Souvenir"
2	Queen	8	"Flash", "Under Pressure"
2	Soft Cell	11	"Bedsitter", "Tainted Love"
2	Spandau Ballet	5	"Chant No. 1 (I Don't Need This Pressure On)", "Muscle Bound"/"Glow"
2	The Specials	9	"Do Nothing"/"Maggie's Farm", "Ghost Town"
2	Starsound	11	"Stars on 45", "Stars on 45 Vol. 2"
2	Status Quo	3	"Rock 'n' Roll", "Something 'Bout You Baby I Like"
2	Stray Cats ^{[M]}	2	"Rock This Town", "Runaway Boys"
2	Ultravox	10	"All Stood Still", "Vienna"

== Notes ==
- ^{a} "The Land of Make Believe" reached its peak of number-one on 16 January 1982 (week ending).
- ^{b} "Imagine", "Happy Xmas (War is Over)" and "(Just Like) Starting Over" all re-entered the top 10 following John Lennon's murder on 8 December 1980. "Imagine" was first released as a single in the UK in 1975 and peaked at number 6. "Happy Xmas (War is Over)" was first released as a single in the UK in 1972 and peaked at number 4. Both singles reached new peaks of numbers 1 and 2, respectively, following Lennon's death.
- ^{c} "Woman" was the first official Lennon single released after his death.
- ^{d} Headgirl was a supergroup made up of Motörhead and Girlschool.
- ^{e} "Making Your Mind Up" was the United Kingdom's winning entry at the Eurovision Song Contest in 1981.
- ^{f} "Chi mai" was used as the theme song for the BBC television series ‘’The Life and Times of David Lloyd George’’.
- ^{g} "Attention to Me" re-entered the top 10 at number 9 on 2 May 1981 (week ending).
- ^{h} Starsound were known as Stars on 45 in their home country, the Netherlands.
- ^{i} "Ossie's Dream (Spurs Are On Their Way to Wembley)" was released by Tottenham Hotspur F.C. to celebrate reaching the FA Cup Final in 1981.
- ^{j} Chas & Dave's appearance on "Ossie's Dream (Spurs Are On Their Way to Wembley)" is uncredited but is counted in their discography.
- ^{k} Figure includes song that first charted in 1980 but peaked in 1981.
- ^{l} Figure includes song that peaked in 1982.
- ^{m} Figure includes song that peaked in 1980.
- ^{n} Figure includes uncredited appearance on Tottenham Hotspur FA Cup Final Squad's "Ossie's Dream (Spurs Are on Their Way to Wembley)".
- ^{o} Figure includes the group project "St Valentine's Day Massacre (EP)" with Girlschool.

== See also ==
- 1981 in British music
- List of number-one singles from the 1980s (UK)
