= Klass (album) =

Compilation album by Bad Manners
- Released: 1983
- Genre: Ska
- Label: MCA

Bad Manners chronology
Forging Ahead (1982)	Klass (1983)	Mental Notes (1985)

Professional ratings
Review scores
Source	Rating
AllMusic	4.5/5 stars

Klass is a compilation by British 2 tone and ska band Bad Manners, released in 1983.

== Track listing ==
1. "Fatty Fatty"
2. "Ne-Ne Na-Na Na-Na Nu-Nu"
3. "Just a Feeling"
4. "Doris"
5. "Special Brew"
6. "Echo Gone Wrong"
7. "Lip Up Fatty"
8. "Ivor the Engine"
9. "Wooly Bully"
10. "Lorraine"
11. "Monster Mash"
12. "Echo 4+2"
