= The Collection (Bad Manners album) =

Compilation album by Bad Manners
- Released: 10 March 1998
- Genre: Ska
- Length: 38:06
- Label: Cleopatra

Bad Manners chronology
Viva la Ska Revolution (1998)	The Collection (1998)	Rare & Fatty (1999)

Professional ratings
Review scores
Source	Rating
AllMusic	4/5 stars

The Collection is a compilation album by British 2 Tone and ska band Bad Manners, released in the United States on 10 March 1998.

== Track listing ==
1. "Skaville UK"
2. "Sally Brown"
3. "Return of the Ugly"
4. "Fatty Fatty"
5. "Bonanza Ska"
6. "Special Brew"
7. "Just a Feeling" (live)
8. "Lorraine" (live)
9. "Walking in the Sunshine" (live)
10. "Can Can" (live)
11. "Lip Up Fatty" (live)
12. "My Girl Lollipop" (live)
