= Viva la Ska Revolution =

Compilation album by Bad Manners
- Released: 20 January 1998
- Genre: Ska
- Label: Recall Records

Bad Manners chronology
Don't Knock the Baldhead: Live (1997)	Viva la Ska Revolution (1998)	The Collection (1998)

Professional ratings
Review scores
Source	Rating
AllMusic	4/5 stars

Viva la Ska Revolution is a compilation album by British two-tone and ska band Bad Manners, released on 20 January 1998.

== Track listing ==
1. "Skaville UK" (12")
2. "Sally Brown" (12")
3. "Bonanza Ska"
4. "Return of the Ugly"
5. "Skinhead Love Affair"
6. "Non Shrewd"
7. "Big 5"
8. "Stampede"
9. "Skinhead Girl"
10. "Mafia"
11. "Pipeline"
12. "Viva la Ska Revolution"
13. "Gonna Get Along Without You" (radio mix)
14. "How Big Do You Love"
15. "Johnny's Knee"
16. "This Is Ska"
17. "Oh Jamaica"
18. "Fatty Fatty"
19. "Lip Up Fatty"
20. "Special Brew"
21. "Rosemary"
22. "Since You've Gone Away"
23. "Walking in the Sunshine" (live)
24. "Can Can" (live)
25. "Samson & Delilah" (live)
26. "Lorraine" (live)
27. "My Girl Lollipop" (live)
28. "Inner London Violence" (live)
29. "Wooly Bully" (live)
30. "Just a Feeling" (live)
