= Anthology (Bad Manners album) =

Compilation album by Bad Manners
- Released: 1989
- Genre: Ska
- Label: Eagle

Anthology is a compilation album by the British ska band Bad Manners, released in 1989.

== Track listing ==
1. "Bonanza Ska"
2. "Skinhead Love Affair"
3. "Big Five"
4. "Non Shrewd"
5. "Hey Little Girl"
6. "Buffalo Ska"
7. "Sally Brown"
8. "How Big Do You Love Me"
9. "Mafia"
10. "Baby Elephant Walk"
11. "Since You've Gone Away"
12. "Memory Train"
13. "Rocksteady Breakfast"
14. "Gonna Get Along Without You (Reggae Version)"
15. "Echo 4+2" (live)
16. "Walking in the Sunshine" (live)
17. "Just a Feeling" (live)
18. "Lip Up Fatty" (live)
19. "Lorraine" (live)
20. "Wooly Bully" (live)
21. "Inner London Violence" (live)
22. "Only Funkin'" (live)
23. "My Girl Lollipop" (live)
24. "Samson and Delilah" (live)
25. "The Magnificent Seven" (live)
26. "Can Can" (live)
27. "Ne-Ne Na-Na Na-Na Nu-Nu" (live)
28. "Special Brew" (live)
