= Woodberry Down School =

Secondary school in north London, 1955–1981

Coordinates: 51°34′15″N 0°5′25″W

- London; England

Information
- Established: 1955
- Closed: 1981

Woodberry Down Comprehensive School was a secondary school located off the Seven Sisters Road in the Manor House area of North London. The now defunct school verges on three London boroughs: Hackney, Haringey and Islington. The school was opened in 1955, and closed in 1981 when it was amalgamated with Clissold School and renamed Stoke Newington School. The new school was founded in 1982 in the building of the former Clissold School.

A mixed school, the pupils were divided into four houses: Keller (Yellow), Curie (Blue), Einstein (Red) and Scott (Green). During the school's first term in 1955 the pupils were tasked to choose the names of the four houses. Many suggestions were put forward by pupils and staff and eventually it was decided to draw up a list of men and women who, by their lives and work, epitomised the school motto, 'Fellowship is Life', and after a campaign, to have an election of four candidates. From 17 international figures Scott of the Antarctic, Albert Einstein, Helen Keller and Marie Curie were selected and gave their names to the four school houses.

The school motto 'Fellowship is Life' was taken from a quote by early Socialist, designer and poet William Morris: "Fellowship is heaven, and lack of fellowship is hell; fellowship is life, and lack of fellowship is death; and the deeds that ye do upon the earth, it is for fellowship's sake that ye do them."

The School badge was specially designed to represent the area the school was located: the Red Griffin was the Stoke Newington Borough Arms, the Green Trees symbolised the Seven Sisters, and the Blue Water symbolised the reservoirs on whose banks the school was built.

== History ==
In its earliest days it was regarded as a model school, and a contemporary newspaper article even advocated that Princess Anne attend the new comprehensive, to see its state-of-the-art teaching at first hand. The founding headmistress was Mrs H R Chetwynd, and her deputy was Mr Jack Hackett.

Through most of the 1970s the headmaster of Woodberry Down School was Michael Marland, who was appointed a CBE in 1977 for services to education. He was one of the leading educational pioneers of the second half of the twentieth century, making a significant contribution to inner-city education. Marland left the school on its merger to focus on creating a new school, North Westminster Community School.

The school was renowned for sporting achievements, especially rugby, and its alumni have included former professional footballer Marcus Gayle. Many other former pupils have gone on to a diverse range of careers. Theo Paphitis of television series Dragon's Den also attended, while the band Bad Manners were formed at the school in 1976. They commemorated the 1981 closure of the school on the back sleeve of their Gosh It's... Bad Manners album, which reached number 18 in the UK Albums Chart that year.

The school celebrated a Jubilee Reunion on the 2 September 2006. The school building has now been largely demolished and new flats are to be built on the site.

== Collections ==
The Institute of Education, University College London holds the personal archive of Michael Marland, the Headteacher of Woodberry Down School between 1971 - 1979. The archive was donated to the Institute by Marland's family in 2011, following his death in 2008. The collection contains papers relating to his time at Woodberry Down, biographical information, and material relating to his policy work and arts advocacy.

== Notable alumni ==
- Toyin Agbetu - social rights activist
- Douglas Trendle (Buster Bloodvessel) – Bad Manners
- Alan Sayag - Bad Manners
- Louis Cook - Bad Manners
- David Farren - Bad Manners
- Brian Tuitt - Bad Manners
- Paul Hyman - Bad Manners
- Marcus Gayle - former professional footballer
- Nick Page - guitarist, composer and producer
- Theo Paphitis - business executive
- Ray Cane - songwriter with Honeybus, under his real name Raymond Byart
- Norman Hart - 1st Duke of Edinburgh Silver then Gold Award Winner 1958/60
- Marcus Adam - 200 and 4 x 100m relay sprinter, who represented Great Britain as both a sprinter and a bobsled Derby. He won the gold medal in the 200 metres at the 1990 Commonwealth Games, and also won gold and silver medals respectively in the 4 x 100 metres relay at the 1990 Commonwealth Games and 1990 European Championships. He is also a member of the team which holds the British record in the 4 x 200 metres relay.
- Bunny Sterling - British Middleweight Boxing Champion, the first Black Commonwealth British Champion
- David Lewis J.P. - Mayor of Milton Keynes 1996-7
- Edward (Terry) Allen - Leader of Tendring District Council 1999-2007, Mayor of Frinton-on-Sea 2007-2009
- Michael Freeman - Fellow of Regent's Park College, University of Oxford
- Ben Frow – television executive, Director of Programmes at Channel 5, formerly holding senior programming and commissioning roles across the UK broadcasting industry, including at Channel 4.
