= It's Burke's Law =

It's Burke's Law (Jamaica Ska Explosion)

Studio album by Prince Buster
- Released: 1965
- Genre: Ska, rocksteady
- Label: Blue Beat
- Producer: Prince Buster (uncredited)

Prince Buster chronology
Fly Flying Ska (1964)	It's Burke's Law (Jamaica Ska Explosion) (1965)	Pain in My Belly (1965)

Professional ratings
Review scores
Source	Rating
AllMusic	link

It's Burke's Law (Jamaica Ska Explosion) is an album from 1965 by the Prince Buster All Stars. The album includes "Al Capone", one of Prince Buster's signature songs.

The TV series Burke's Law ran from 1963 to 1965.

== Track listing ==
1. "Burke's Law"
2. "Al Capone"
3. "Gun the Man Down"
4. "Skahara"
5. "Trip to Mars"
6. "Rygin'"
7. "Mighty As a Rose"
8. "Indian Love Call"
9. "Here Comes the Bride"
10. "Almost Like Being in Love"
11. "Shep on Top"
12. "Feel Up"

== Personnel ==
Prince Buster All Stars

- Prince Buster - vocals
- Jah Jerry Haynes - guitar
- Ernest Ranglin - bass guitar
- Gladstone Anderson - piano
- Arkland "Drumbago" Parks - drums
- Dennis "Ska" Campbell, Val Bennett - tenor saxophone
- Oswald "Baba" Brooks, Raymond Harper - trumpet
- Junior Nelson - trombone
