= Return of the Ugly =

Studio album by Bad Manners
- Released: 14 August 1989
- Recorded: Norfolk, UK
- Genre: Ska
- Length: 37:40
- Label: Blue Beat/Combat

Bad Manners chronology
| Mental Notes (1985) | Return of the Ugly (1989) | Anthology (1989) |

Singles from Return of the Ugly
- 1. "Skaville UK" Released: May 1989

Professional ratings
Review scores
| Source | Rating |
|---|---|
| AllMusic | link |

Return of the Ugly is the sixth studio album by British 2 tone and ska band Bad Manners released in 1989. It was the band's first release on an independent label and their first album release without David Farren, Brian Tuitt, Andy Marson and Paul Hyman.

== Track listing ==
- All songs by Bad Manners unless noted.
1. "Skaville UK" – 2:33
2. "Sally Brown" (Laurel Aitken) – 2:35
3. "Since You've Gone Away" – 3:29
4. "Rosemary" – 2:20
5. "Bonanza Ska" (Ray Evans, Jay Livingston) – 4:10
6. "Return of the Ugly" – 2:54
7. "Hey Little Girl" (Aitken) – 3:50
8. "Buffalo Ska" – 2:42
9. "Memory Train" – 2:58
10. "This Is Ska" (Long) – 2:42

== Personnel ==
- Buster Bloodvessel – Lead Vocals & Production
- Louis Alphonso – Guitar
- Martin Stewart – Keyboards
- Winston Bazoomies – Harmonica
- Chris Kane – Tenor Saxophone
- Alan Perry – Alto Saxophone
- Nicky Welsh – Bass
- Ian Fullwood – Tenor Saxophone
- Jan Brahms – Trombone
- Jon Preston – Trumpet
- Perry Melius – Drums
- Longsy D – Additional Drums & Additional Production
