= Stupidity (Bad Manners album) =

Studio album by Bad Manners
- Released: 17 June 2003
- Genre: Ska
- Label: Bad Records
- Producer: Buster Bloodvessel, Peter Ker, Louis Cook, Glover

Bad Manners chronology
Special Brew (2000)	Stupidity (2003)	Can Can (2006)

Professional ratings
Review scores
Source	Rating
AllMusic	3/5 stars

Stupidity is the ninth and final studio album by British 2 tone and ska band Bad Manners, released on 17 June 2003.

== Track listing ==
- All songs by Bad Manners unless noted.
1. "Fatman" (Neil Hefti)
2. "Can't Take My Eyes off You" (Bob Crewe, Bob Gaudio) [not hsm version]
3. "Happy"
4. "What Ya Gonna Do"
5. "Black Night" (Ritchie Blackmore)
6. "I'm a Mummy" (Bob McFadden, Rod McKuen)
7. "Way out Mummy" (Robert Ritterbusch)
8. "Teddy Bears Picnic" (J.W. Bratton)
9. "Cider Drinker" (The Wurzels)
10. "Tossin"
11. "Dat Think There" (Pluto Shervington)
12. "I Don't Care" (Copyright Control)
13. "Do Nothing" (Golding)
14. "Eng-Er-Land" (Copyright Control)
15. "Hoots Mon" (Lord Rockingham's XI)
16. "Manners Knees-Up" (Copyright Control)

== Personnel ==
- Buster Bloodvessel – Lead Vocals & Production
- Louis Alphonso – Guitar, Additional Keyboards & Production
- Alan Perry – Alto Saxophone & Backing Vocals
- Lee Thompson – Bass
- Rickesh Macwana – Keyboards
- Trevor Irving – Trumpet
- Warren Middleton – Trombone
- Matt Godwin – Saxophone
- Tony 'Treacle' Richardson – Saxophone
- Tony Ardin – Saxophone
- Carlton Hunt – Drums
- Russel Wynn – Percussion
- Simon Cuell – Guitar, Backing Vocals & Production
- Chris Bull – Trumpet
- Trevor Swift – Saxophone
- John Gale – Saxophone
- Dave Welton – Bass Trombone
- Chris Welch – Trumpet
- Alex Arudel – Trumpet
- Carlton Hunt – Percussion
- Mark Harrison – Drums
- John Thompson – Bass
- Steve Armstrong – Guitar
- Phil Baptiste – Drums
- Dave Turner – Harmonica
- Anton O'Dochertaigh – Bagpipes
- Peter Ker – Engineer & Production
- Glover – Additional Production
- Engineered by Mikey Miller
- Recorded at 811 Studios, Cowfold, Sussex
