= Heavy Petting =

Heavy Petting may refer to:

== Film and television ==
- Heavy Petting (2007 film), American dog comedy
- Heavy Petting (1989 film), American celebrity documentary
- Heavy Petting (TV series), Indian series about pets

== Music ==
- Heavy Petting (album), 1997 album by Bad Manners
- Heavy Petting Zoo, 1996 album by NOFX

== See also ==
- No Heavy Petting, 1976 album by UFO
- Heavy Petting Zoo, 1996 album by NOFX
