= Can Can (album) =

Live album by Bad Manners
- Released: 18 July 2006
- Genre: Ska
- Label: Snapper Classics

Bad Manners chronology
Stupidity (2003)	Can Can (2006)

Professional ratings
Review scores
Source	Rating
AllMusic	2/5 stars

Can Can is a live album by the British 2 Tone and ska band Bad Manners, released on 18 July 2006.

== Track listing ==
1. "In the Mood"
2. "Echo 4 + 2"
3. "This Is Ska"
4. "My Girl Lollipop"
5. "Fatty Fatty"
6. "Black Night"
7. "Feel Like Jumping"
8. "Walking in the Sunshine"
9. "Skaville U.K."
10. "King Ska/Fa"
11. "Pipeline"
12. "Red River Ska"
13. "Too Good to Be True"
14. "Just a Feeling"
15. "You Fat Bastard"
16. "Skinhead Girl"
17. "El Pussycat"
18. "Ne-Ne Na-Na Na-Na Nu-Nu"
19. "Don't You Be Angry"
20. "Woolly Bully"
21. "Special Brew"
22. "Don't Knock the Baldheads"
23. "England Football Medley" (Tom Hark, March of the Mods, The Great Escape, Come On Eileen)
24. "Lip Up Fatty"
25. "Can Can"
