= Mental Notes =

Mental Notes may refer to:

- Mental Notes (Split Enz album), 1975 album
- Mental Notes (Bad Manners album), 1985 album
