= Agbetu =

- Gender: Male
- Language: Yoruba

Origin
- Origin: Nigeria
- Meaning: The renowned one consoles (me).
- Region of origin: South West, Nigeria

Àgbétù is a Nigerian surname of Yoruba origin, typically bestowed upon males. It means "The renowned one consoles (me).". Àgbétù is a powerful name with depth and profound meaning. This name is common among the Ilesha people of the Southwest, Nigeria.

== Notable individuals with the name ==
- Akeem Agbetu (born 1988), Nigerian footballer.
- Toyin Agbetu, British activist, community educator, and filmmaker.
