= Fly Flying Ska =

Studio album by Prince Buster
- Released: 1964
- Genre: Ska, Rocksteady
- Label: Blue Beat
- Producer: Prince Buster (uncredited)

Prince Buster chronology
I Feel the Spirit (1963)	Fly Flying Ska (1964)	It's Burke's Law (1965)

Professional ratings
Review scores
Source	Rating
Allmusic	3.5/5 stars
Starpulse	4/5 stars

Fly Flying Ska was Prince Buster's second studio album. The album features many ska legends, including The Skatalites, Toots and the Maytals, Roland Alphonso, and Don Drummond among others.

== Track listing ==
1. "Flying Ska (Wings of a Dove)" - Prince Buster
2. "Lucky 7" - Prince Buster
3. "Perhaps" - Prince Buster featuring The Skatalites
4. "My Queen" - Prince Buster featuring Bobby Gaynor and Errol Dunkley
5. "I Go" - Prince Buster featuring Millie Small and Roy Panton
6. "Roland Plays the Prince" - Prince Buster featuring Roland Alphonso
7. "Call Me" - Prince Buster
8. "Eye for an Eye" - Prince Buster
9. "River Jordan" - Prince Buster featuring Owen Gray
10. "The Greatest" - Prince Buster
11. "Ska War" - Prince Buster featuring The Maytals
12. "The Burial" - Prince Buster featuring Don Drummond
