= Hoots Mon! =

Hoots Mon! may refer to:

- Hoot Mon! (1919 film), an American comedy film starring Stan Laurel
- Hoots Mon! (1940 film), a British comedy film starring Max Miller

See also

- Hoots Mon, a song written by Harry Robinson and performed by Lord Rockingham's XI
- Hoots Mon, a track on the Bad Manners album Stupidity
