= I Feel the Spirit =

Studio album by Prince Buster
- Released: 1963
- Genre: Ska, Rocksteady
- Label: Blue Beat
- Producer: Siggy Jackson

Prince Buster chronology
I Feel the Spirit (1963)	Fly Flying Ska (1964)

Professional ratings
Review scores
Source	Rating
Allmusic	link

I Feel the Spirit is the 1963 debut album by Prince Buster. It was released in the UK by Blue Beat Records, and became the first ska album to be released outside of Jamaica.

The album includes the songs "Madness", "They Got to Come", "Wash You Troubles Away", and "Black Head Chinaman". The musical accompaniment was by the Drumbago All Stars, Les Dawson Blues Unit and Rico Rodriguez Blues Band. The cover photography was credited to Dezo Hoffmann.

"Madness" was covered and released as a single by the British ska group Madness, for their 1979 album One Step Beyond....

== Track listing ==
All tracks composed by Prince Buster

1. "I Feel the Spirit" - 3:21
2. "Madness" - 2:37
3. "Don't Make Me Cry" - 3:41
4. "They Got to Come" - 2:47
5. "All Alone" - 2:29
6. "Soul of Africa" - 2:48
7. "Wash Your Troubles Away" - 3:23
8. "Jealous" - 2:56
9. "Black Head Chinaman" - 3:07
10. "Beggars Are No Choosers" - 3:14
11. "Run Man Run" - 2:31
12. "Just You" - 2:42
