= Ska 'n' B =

Studio album by Bad Manners
- Released: April 1980
- Genre: Ska, 2-Tone
- Length: 35:50
- Label: Magnet
- Producer: Roger Lomas

Bad Manners chronology
Ska 'n' B (1980)	Loonee Tunes! (1981)

Singles from Ska 'n' B
- 1. "Ne-Ne Na-Na Na-Na Nu-Nu" Released: February 1980; 2. "Lip Up Fatty" Released: June 1980; 3. "Special Brew" Released: September 1980

Professional ratings
Review scores
Source	Rating
AllMusic	link
Smash Hits	6/10

Ska 'n' B is the first album by British 2 Tone and ska band Bad Manners from the year 1980. It reached number 34 on the UK album chart.

== Track listing ==
- All songs by Bad Manners unless noted.
1. "Ne-Ne Na-Na Na-Na Nu-Nu" (Eddie Dean, Al Dredick) – 2:35
2. "Here Comes the Major" – 2:54
3. "Fatty Fatty" (Clancy Eccles, Leroy Sibbles) – 2:25
4. "King Ska/Fa" – 4:22
5. "Monster Mash" (Leonard Capizzi, Bobby "Boris" Pickett) – 3:01
6. "Caledonia" (Louis Jordan, Fleecie Moore) – 2:58
7. "Magnificent 7" (Elmer Bernstein) – 2:31
8. "Wooly Bully" (Domingo Samudio) – 3:09
9. "Lip Up Fatty" – 2:48
10. "Special Brew" – 3:37
11. "Inner London Violence" – 3:56
12. "Scruffy, The Huffy Chuffy Tugboat" – 1:39
- 2011 Bonus Tracks
1. "Holidays" – 2:12
2. "Night Bus to Dalston" – 2:18
3. "Lip Up Fatty" (Extended Edition) – 4:42
4. "Special Brew" (Single Version) – 3:19
5. "Ivor The Engine" – 2:27

== Personnel ==
Bad Manners

- Buster Bloodvessel – vocals
- Louis 'Alphonso' Cook – guitar
- David Farren – bass
- Brian Tuitt – drums
- Martin Stewart – keyboards
- Chris Kane – saxophone
- Andrew Marson – saxophone
- Paul "Gus" Hyman – trumpet
- Winston Bazoomies – harmonica

== Credits ==
Roger Lomas – Production

== Notes ==
Recorded at Horizon Studios, Coventry
