= Can Can (Bad Manners song) =

1981 single by Bad Manners

Single by Bad Manners

from the album Gosh It's ... Bad Manners
- B-side: "Armchair Disco"
- Released: 19 June 1981
- Genre: Ska
- Length: 2:55
- Label: Magnet
- Songwriter: Jacques Offenbach
- Producer: Roger Lomas

Bad Manners singles chronology
| "Just a Feeling" (1981) | "Can Can" (1981) | "Walking in the Sunshine" (1981) |

"Can Can" is a song by the English 2-tone and ska band Bad Manners, released in June 1981 as the first single from their third album Gosh It's ... Bad Manners. It is an instrumental song, based on the music "Galop infernal" written by French composer Jacques Offenbach which was later adopted as the music for the dance the can-can. The arrangement was credited to Bad Manners. It peaked at number 3 for four weeks on the UK Singles Chart, becoming the band's joint biggest hit with "Special Brew".

== Reception ==
Reviewing the song for Record Mirror, John Shearlaw wrote "You wouldn't believe that Buster Bloodvessel could keep his (enormous) mouth shut for the length of a single, but that's exactly what he does on this delightful work-out of the theme that launched a thousand Westerns; and one that's a guaranteed hit. Dizzy production, instant appeal and a truly breathtaking piece of opportunism. Lift those legs!".

== Track listing ==
1. "Can Can" – 2:55
2. "Armchair Disco" – 3:10

== Charts ==
| Chart (1981) | Peak position |
|---|---|
| Australia (Kent Music Report) | 76 |
| Belgium (Ultratop 50 Flanders) | 13 |
| Ireland (IRMA) | 15 |
| Netherlands (Dutch Top 40) | 11 |
| Netherlands (Single Top 100) | 14 |
| UK Singles (OCC) | 3 |
