= Sister Big Stuff =

Studio album by Prince Buster
- Released: 1976, 2011 (re-issue)
- Genre: Reggae, dub
- Label: Sunspot Records (UK based)

Prince Buster chronology
Chi Chi Run (1973)	Sister Big Stuff (1976)	She Was a Rough Rider (1978)

Sister Big Stuff is an album by reggae musician Prince Buster. It was originally released in 1976, and was re-issued on 180g vinyl and CD through Sunspot Records in November 2011.

At the time of its original release, Sister Big Stuff was a revolutionary record on the reggae scene and was very influential. This album also stands out as it finds Prince Buster singing about his honest observations on life in the ghetto, Rastafarian evangelism, children's rhymes and cinema references.

== Track listing ==
1. "South of the Border"
2. "Still"
3. "Protection"
4. "Why Not Tonight"
5. "Wish Your Picture"
6. "Sata A Masa Gana"
7. "Sister Big Stuff"
8. "Stand Accused (I Stand Accused)"
9. "Bridge Over Troubled Water"
10. "Stick By Me"
11. "Young Gifted and Black"
12. "Cool Operator"

Bonus tracks

1. "Police Trim Rasta"
2. "My Happiness"
3. "My Heart Is Gone"

== See also ==
- List of reggae musicians
