= Gosh It's ... Bad Manners =

Gosh It's... Bad Manners

Studio album by Bad Manners
- Released: October 1981
- Genres: Ska; 2-Tone
- Label: Magnet
- Producer: Roger Lomas

Bad Manners chronology
Loonee Tunes! (1980)	Gosh It's... Bad Manners (1981)	Forging Ahead (1982)

Singles from Gosh It's... Bad Manners
- 1. "Can Can" Released: June 1980; 2. "Walking in the Sunshine" Released: September 1980

Professional ratings
Review scores
Source	Rating
AllMusic	2/5 stars

Gosh It's ... Bad Manners is the third album by English 2 Tone and ska band Bad Manners from October 1981 and their most popular and successful album, peaking at number 18 on the UK album chart. The band had originally formed in 1976 while the members were together at Woodberry Down Comprehensive School, North London. They commemorated the 1980 closure of the school on the back sleeve of the album.

== Track listing ==
- All songs by Bad Manners unless noted.
1. "Walking in the Sunshine" – 3:29
2. "Dansetta" – 3:19
3. "Can Can" – 2:49 (Jacques Offenbach)
4. "Weeping and Wailing" – 3:42
5. "Casablanca (Rags and Riches)" – 4:53
6. "Don't Be Angry" (Live) (Nappy Brown) – 2:33
7. "Ben E. Wriggle" – 3:50
8. "Runaway" – 3:11
9. "Never Will Change" – 3:06
10. "Only Funkin'" – 3:37
11. "End of the World" – 3:00
12. "Gherkin" – 4:40
- 2011 Bonus Tracks
1. "Armchair Disco" – 3:12
2. "Night Bus to Dalston" (Vocal Version) – 2:14
3. "Buona Sera" (Carl Sigman, Peter DeRose) – 2:50
4. "The New One" – 1:05
5. "No Respect" – 1:58
6. "Walking in the Sunshine" (Extended Version) – 5:33

== Personnel ==
- Buster Bloodvessel – Vocals
- Louis 'Alphonso' Cook – Guitar
- David Farren – Bass & String Bass
- Martin Stewart – Keyboards & Bagpipes
- Brian Tuitt – Drums & Percussion
- Chris Kane – Saxophone & Tin Whistle
- Andrew Marson – Saxophone
- Paul "Gus" Hyman – Trumpet
- Winston Bazoomies – Harmonica
- Roger Lomas – Production
- Ted Sharp – Engineer
- Recorded & Mixed at Rockfield Studios, Monmouth, Wales
