= Forging Ahead =

Studio album by Bad Manners
- Released: October 1982
- Genre: Ska
- Length: 41:50
- Label: Magnet
- Producer: Roger Lomas

Bad Manners chronology
Gosh It's... Bad Manners (1981)	Forging Ahead (1982)	Klass (1983)

Singles from Forging Ahead
- 1. "Got No Brains" Released: May 1982; 2. "My Girl Lollipop" Released: July 1982; 3. "Samson and Delilah" Released: October 1982; 4. "That'll Do Nicely" Released: April 1983

Forging Ahead is the fourth album by British 2 Tone and ska band Bad Manners from the year 1982. It was the group's last album on Magnet Records. The picture sleeve to the right, is of the American edition of the album that was released two years later in 1984, with a slightly different track list to the official UK issue.

Professional ratings
Review scores
Source	Rating
AllMusic	3/5 stars

== American track listing ==
- All songs by Bad Manners unless noted.
1. "That'll Do Nicely" – 2:52
2. "Salad Bar" – 2:51
3. "Tonight Is Your Night" – 3:25
4. "Samson and Delilah (Biblical Version)" – 5:18
5. "Exodus" (Ernest Gold) – 2:45
6. "Got No Brains" – 3:48
7. "My Girl Lollipop" (Morris Levy, Johnny Roberts) – 4:59
8. "Falling Out of Love" – 3:23
9. "Seventh Heaven" – 3:28
10. "Educating Marmalade" – 3:16
11. "What's Up Crazy Pup" (Van Morrison) – 1:56
12. "Your" – 3:49

== 2011 release: UK album and bonus tracks ==
1. "Salad Bar" – 2:51
2. "Tonight is Your Night" – 3:25
3. "Samson and Delilah" (Biblical Version) – 5:16
4. "Exodus" – 2:46
5. "Got No Brains" – 3:49
6. "Rose of Italy" – 3:36
7. "My Girl Lollipop" (Extended Lick Mix) – 4:58
8. "Falling Out of Love" – 3:24
9. "Seventh Heaven" – 3:28
10. "Educating Marmalade" – 3:16
11. "What's Up Crazy Pup" – 1:57
12. "Your" – 3:52
13. "Psychedelic Eric" – 3:37
14. "Flashpoint" – 3:47
15. "Ben E. Wriggle" (Remix) – 6:06
16. "My Girl Lollipop (Single Version) – 2:45
17. "Samson and Delilah" (Single Version) – 3:32
18. "Good Honest Man" – 2:12
19. "Your" (Instrumental Version) – 3:27
20. "That'll Do Nicely" – 2:52
21. "Monster Love" (Dub) – 2:58
22. "That'll Do Nicely" (Express Version) – 4:49

== Personnel ==
- Buster Bloodvessel – Lead Vocals
- Louis Alphonso – Guitar
- David Farren – Bass
- Martin Stewart – Keyboards
- Brian Tuitt – Drums
- Chris Kane – Tenor Saxophone
- Andrew Marson – Alto Saxophone, Banjo
- Paul "Gus" Hyman – Trumpet
- Winston Bazoomies – Harmonica, Backing Vocals
- Den Hegarty - Baritone Saxophone
- The Lillettes - Backing Vocals
- Roger Lomas – Producer
- Ted Sharp – Engineer
- Recorded at Rockfield Studios, Monmouth, Wales
