= Prince Buster =

Jamaican musician (1938–2016)

Prince Buster OD
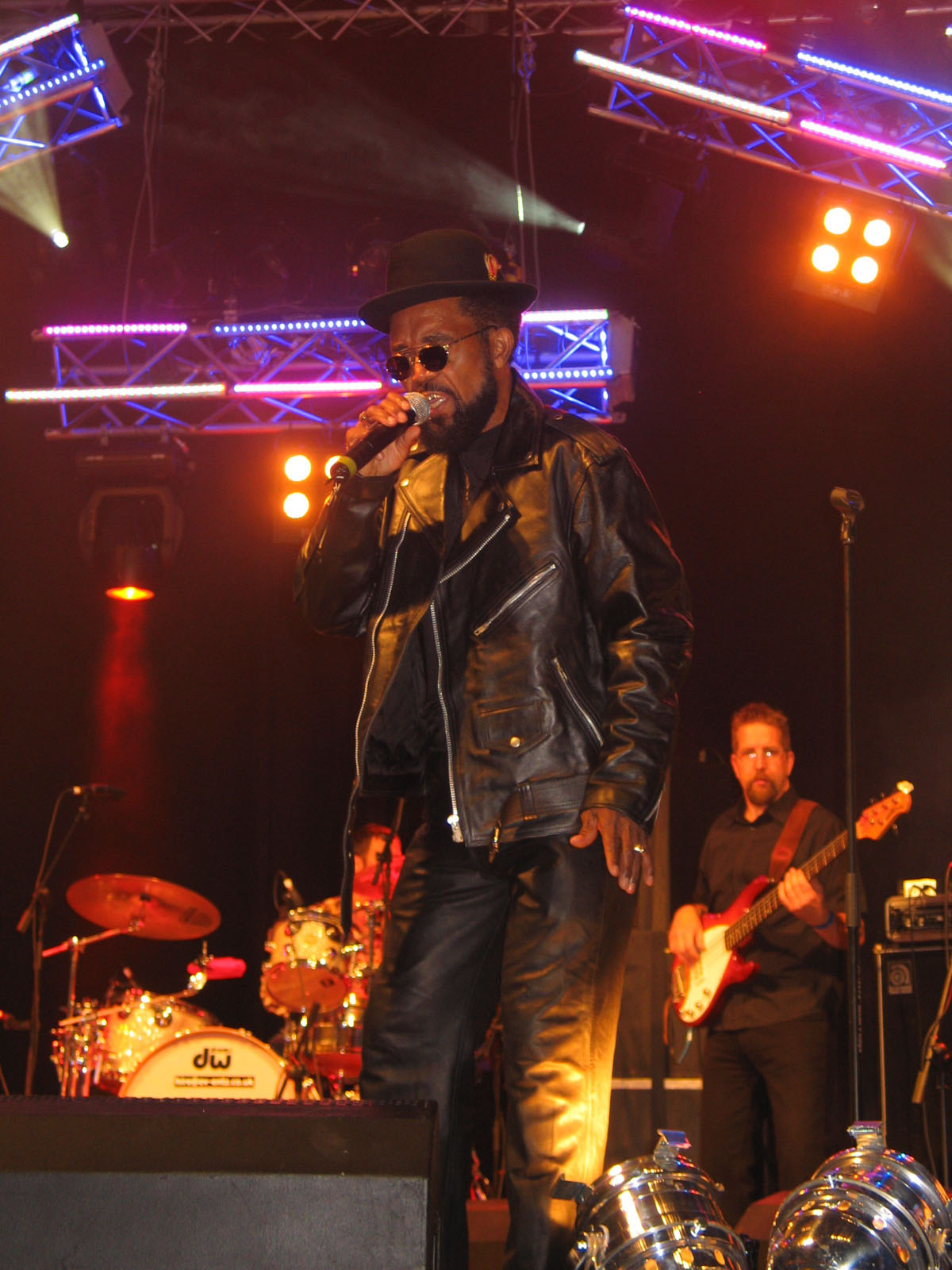
- Prince Buster performing in 2008

Background information
- Born: Cecil Bustamente Campbell; 24 May 1938; Kingston, British Jamaica
- Origin: Jamaica
- Died: 8 September 2016 (aged 78) Miami, Florida, U.S.
- Genres: Ska; rocksteady; reggae
- Occupations: Musician; songwriter; producer
- Years active: 1961–2016
- Labels: Blue Beat; Fab

Cecil Bustamente Campbell OD (24 May 1938 – 8 September 2016), known professionally as Prince Buster, was a Jamaican singer-songwriter and producer. The records he released in the 1960s influenced and shaped the course of Jamaican contemporary music and created a legacy of work that would be drawn upon later by reggae and ska artists.

== Early life ==
Cecil Bustamente Campbell was born in Orange Street in Kingston, Jamaica, on 24 May 1938. His middle name was given to him by his family in honour of the Labour activist and first post-Independence Prime Minister William Alexander Clarke Bustamante. In the early 1940s, Campbell was sent to live with his grandmother in rural Jamaica where his family's commitment to the Christian faith gave him his earliest musical experiences in the form of church singing as well as private family prayer and hymn meetings. Returning to live at Orange Street while still a young boy, Campbell attended the Central Branch School and St. Anne's School.

While at school, Campbell performed three or four times a week at the Glass Bucket Club, as part of Frankie Lymon's Sing and Dance Troupe; rock 'n' roll-themed shows were popular during the 1950s, with the Glass Bucket Club establishing a reputation as the premier music venue and social club for Jamaican teenagers at that time. Upon leaving school he found himself drawn to the ranks of followers of sound system Tom the Great Sebastian. Jamaican sound systems at that time were playing American rhythm 'n' blues and Campbell credits Tom the Great Sebastian with his first introduction to the songs and artists that would later influence his own music: The Clovers' "Middle of the Night", Fats Domino's "Mardi Gras in New Orleans", the Griffin Brothers featuring Margie Day, and Shirley & Lee.

== Career ==
Campbell became more actively involved in the operational side of running a sound system after he was introduced to Clement 'Coxsone' Dodd, a musically inclined businessman who operated one of Kingston's most popular sound systems. Campbell found himself fulfilling a variety of roles for Coxsone: providing security, handling ticket receipts, identifying and sourcing music as well as working in the essential role of selector. The knowledge he gained about the financial and logistical aspects of staging a sound system dance was put to good use when Campbell made the decision to start his own sound system called 'Voice of the People'. Campbell approached his family and a radio shop owner called Mr Wong for financial backing; both parties agreed. Campbell's 'Voice of the People' sound system was soon operational and within a short time had established itself as a rival to the sound systems of Coxsone and Duke Reid. Campbell applied to the Farm Work Program (guest worker scheme for the US agricultural sector) with the intention of buying music for his sound system but, on the day of departure, was refused entry into the scheme. Knowing that he would not be able to personally source records from the US, Campbell decided to record his own music. He approached Arkland "Drumbago" Parks, a professional drummer at the Baby Grand Club who had arranged and recorded a special (exclusive recording) for the Count Boysie sound system. Drumbago agreed to help and Campbell immediately began rehearsing with the musicians at the Baby Grand Club, including the guitarist Jah Jerry, who played on Campbell's first recording session.

=== 1960s ===
In 1961, Campbell released his first single "Little Honey" / "Luke Lane Shuffle" featuring Jah Jerry, Drumbago and Rico Rodriquez recording under the name of Buster's Group. In that same year, he produced "Oh Carolina" by the Folkes Brothers, which was released on his Wild Bells label. The drumming on the record was provided by members of the Count Ossie Group, nyabinghi drummers from the Rastafarian community, Camp David, situated on the Wareika Hill above Kingston. After becoming a hit in Jamaica, "Oh Carolina" was licensed to Melodisc, a UK label owned by Emil Shalet. Melodisc released the track on their subsidiary label Blue Beat; the label would go on to become synonymous with 1960s ska releases for the UK market.

Campbell recorded prolifically throughout the 1960s; notable early ska releases include: "Madness" (1963), "Wash Wash" (1963, with Ernest Ranglin on bass), "One Step Beyond" (1964) and "Al Capone" (1964). The documentary This is Ska (1964), hosted by Tony Verity and filmed at the Sombrero Club, includes Campbell performing his Jamaican hit "Wash Wash". In 1964, Campbell met World Heavyweight Champion boxer Muhammad Ali, who invited him to attend a Nation of Islam talk at Mosque 29 in Miami. That year Campbell joined the Nation of Islam and also started to release material, including a version of Louis X's "White Man's Heaven is a Black Man's Hell," on his own imprint label called "Islam". In 1965, he appeared in Millie in Jamaica (a film short about Millie Small's return to Jamaica after the world-wide success of "My Boy Lollipop") which was broadcast on Rediffusion's Friday evening pop show Ready, Steady, Go! Campbell had a top twenty hit in the UK with the single "Al Capone" (no. 18, February 1967). He toured the UK in spring 1967 appearing at the Marquee Club in May and later toured America to promote the RCA Victor LP release The Ten Commandments (From Man To Woman). "Ten Commandments" reached no. 81 on the Billboard Hot 100, becoming his only hit single in the United States. By the late 1960s Campbell was once again at the forefront of a musical change in Jamaica; the new music would be called rocksteady. Campbell tracks like "Shaking Up Orange Street" (1967) were arranged with the slower, more soulful rocksteady template as used by Alton Ellis ("Rock Steady") and many others. The album Judge Dread Rock Steady was released in 1967, and the title track "Judge Dread" with its satirical theme and vocal style proved to be popular to the point of parody. In 1968, the compilation album FABulous was released, opening with the track "Earthquake" (which revisited the theme of Orange Street) and including earlier hits. The album has regularly been reissued in the UK.

=== 1970s and beyond ===
His career slowed up in the 1970s as the predominant style moved away from ska and rocksteady towards roots reggae, in part because as a Muslim he found it difficult to tailor his style towards a Rastafari audience. However he did make an appearance in the 1972 movie The Harder They Come, which featured Campbell in a cameo role as a DJ.

He subsequently moved to Miami to pursue business interests including running a jukebox company. From 1973 Campbell effectively retired from the music business, with only a handful of compilation albums issued. Even with the new interest in his music following the 2-Tone-led ska revival in the UK in 1979, he remained out of the limelight. Following an acclaimed appearance at the first Reggae Sunsplash event in July 1984 in London, he resumed performing with the Skatalites as his backing band towards the end of the 1980s, and resumed recording in 1992.

In 1994, a UK court ruled in favour of John Folkes and Greensleeves Records after they brought a lawsuit against Campbell and Melodisc (Campbell by this time had acquired Melodisc) concerning authorship of "Oh Carolina". Campbell had a top 30 hit in the UK with the track "Whine and Grine" (no. 21, April 1998) after the song had been used in an advert for Levi's.

In 2001, Campbell was awarded the Order of Distinction by the Jamaican Government for his contribution to music. He performed at the 2002 Legends Of Ska festival in Toronto. Other appearances include: Sierra Nevada World Music Festival in 2003; the 2006 Boss Sounds Reggae Festival in Newcastle upon Tyne, the 40th Montreux Jazz Festival in Switzerland with the Delroy Williams Junction Band, and the 2007 UK Rhythm Festival. Campbell resided in Miami, Florida.

== Legacy ==
The UK ska revival at the end of the 1970s that started with the 2-Tone label from Coventry introduced Campbell's music to a new generation of listeners. In 1979 the band Madness released their first single on 2-Tone, a tribute to Campbell called "The Prince". The B-side was a cover of the Campbell song "Madness" from which they took their name. Their second single, released on the Stiff label ("The Prince" would be the only single released by Madness on the 2-Tone label), was a cover of Campbell's "One Step Beyond", which reached the UK Top 10.

On their self-titled debut album, the Specials covered "Too Hot" and borrowed elements from Campbell's "Judge Dread" (in the song "Stupid Marriage") and "Al Capone" (in the song "Gangsters"). The Specials also included a cover of "Enjoy Yourself" on their second album More Specials.

The Beat covered "Rough Rider" and "Whine & Grine" on their album I Just Can't Stop It. Campbell's song "Hard Man Fe Dead" was covered by the U.S. ska band the Toasters on their 1996 album Hard Band For Dead.

In 2002, electronic duo Mint Royale sampled Prince Buster for their single "Sexiest Man in Jamaica" on their album Dancehall Places. In September 2002 the tune was released on David Wood and Neil Claxton's Faith & Hope Records label and debuted at no. 20 on the UK singles chart.

Filmmaker Nicolas Winding Refn used Campbell's "Ten Commandments Of Man" on the soundtrack of his 2019 television series "Too Old to Die Young".

The Specials, with activist and vocalist Saffiyah Khan, recorded a rebuttal to "Ten Commandments Of Man", also called "10 Commandments", on their 2019 album Encore, criticising the original's outdated representation of women.

Sex Pistols guitarist Steve Jones cited Prince Buster as an inspiration in his autobiography Lonely Boy.

== Death ==
Campbell died on the morning of 8 September 2016, in a hospital in Miami, Florida, after suffering heart problems, according to his wife. He had reportedly been in poor health for some time after a series of strokes, including one in 2009 that left him unable to walk.

== Selected album discography ==
- I Feel the Spirit (1963), Blue Beat
- Fly Flying Ska (1964), Blue Beat
- National Ska – Pain in My Belly (1964), Blue Beat
- It's Burke's Law (1965), Blue Beat
- Ska-Lip-Soul(1965),
- What A Hard Man Fe Dead (1967), Blue Beat
- Judge Dread Rock Steady (1967), Blue Beat/Prince Buster
- Ten Commandments (1967), RCA Victor
- Wreck A Pum Pum (1968), Jet Star
- She Was A Rough Rider (1968), Blue Beat
- The Outlaw (1969), Bluebeat
- Big Five (1971), Melodisc
- Dance Cleopatra Dance (1972), Blue Elephant
- The Message Dub Wise (1972), Melodisc/Fab
- Sister Big Stuff (1976), Melodisc

Compilations

- The Original Golden Oldies Vol. 1 (1967), Prince Buster
- Original Golden Oldies Vol. 2 (1967), Shack Recordings
- FABulous Greatest Hits (1968), Fab
- Tutti Frutti (1968), Fab
- The Prophet (1994), Lagoon
- King of Ska (2000), Prince Buster/Jet Star
- Rock A Shacka Vol. 5 – Dance Cleopatra (2003), Universal

Live

- Prince Buster on Tour (1967), Blue Beat
- King of Blue Beat (2001) (reissue of "Prince Buster Live On Tour"), Wah Wah
- Prince of Peace (2003), Island – Prince Buster with Determinations

== UK hit singles ==
Date	Song title	UK Singles Chart peak	Weeks on chart
23 February 1967	"Al Capone"	18	13
4 April 1998	"Whine and Grine"	21	3
