= Dat (song) =

Song by Pluto Shervington
- B-side: "Dat (version)"
- Released: 1976
- Genre: Reggae, novelty
- Length: 3:55
- Label: Opal Records
- Songwriter(s): Leighton Shervington
- Producer(s): Paul Khouri

Official audio
- "Dat" on YouTube

"Dat" is a song by Jamaican singer Pluto Shervington, released as a single by him, on the Opal Records record label, in 1976.

The single reached number 6 in the UK Singles Chart on 6 March 1976, staying in the charts for a total of eight weeks. It was Shervington's biggest hit in the UK.

The song is about a Rastafarian, contrary to the faith, trying to buy pork without actually naming it to the butcher, within earshot of his "brethren", thereby saving enough money to be able to afford marijuana:

Rasta Ozzy, from up the hill
Decide fi check on 'im grocery bill
And when 'im add up de things 'im need
Di dooney done, weh him save fi buy little weed

Unable to get the butcher to take the hint, he asks for a pound of "Dat t'ing dere".

Although released in the UK as a novelty song, it reflects on the financial situation faced by many people at the time in the ghettos of Kingston, Jamaica.

On 19 February 1976 Shervington appeared on video, performing the song, on BBC's Top of the Pops and appeared again in the video the following week on 4 March. Trojan Records capitalized on this success by reissuing his first single, "Ram Goat Liver", which peaked just outside the top 40 in the UK.
