= Mental Notes (Bad Manners album) =

Studio album by Bad Manners
- Released: 1985
- Studio: Townhouse Studios (London); Oasis Studios (London); Parkgate Studios (Battle, Sussex)
- Genre: Reggae; synth-pop; ska
- Length: 32:13
- Label: Portrait
- Producer: Steve Thompson; Michael Barbiero

Bad Manners chronology
Klass (1983)	Mental Notes (1985)	Return of the Ugly (1989)

Singles from Mental Notes
- 1. "Blue Summer" Released: August 1985; 2. "What the Papers Say" Released: December 1985; 3. "Bang the Drum All Day" Released: 1985 (US 12"-only release); 4. "Tossin' in My Sleep" Released: March 1986

Professional ratings
Review scores
Source	Rating
AllMusic	3/5 stars

Mental Notes is the fifth studio album by the English 2 tone and ska band Bad Manners, released in 1985 by Portrait Records.

== Track listing ==
All songs by Bad Manners unless noted.

Side one

1. "What the Papers Say" – 2:54
2. "Blue Summer" – 3:42
3. "Body Talk" – 3:41
4. "Tossin' in My Sleep" – 3:50
5. "Tie Me Up" (Ney Smith) – 2:00

Side two

6. "Bang the Drum All Day" (Todd Rundgren) – 3:18
7. "Destination Unknown" 3:15
8. "Mountain of Love" – 3:28
9. "Work" – 3:19
10. "Saturday Night" – 2:46

== Personnel ==
- Buster Bloodvessel – lead vocals; production
- Louis Alphonso – guitar
- Martin Stewart – keyboards
- Stevie Smith – harmonica
- Chris Kane – tenor saxophone
- Paul Hyman – trumpet
- Andy Marsden – alto saxophone
- David Farren – bass
- Brian Tuitt – drums
- Jimmy Scott – percussion
