= Al Capone (song) =

Single by Prince Buster
- B-side: "One Step Beyond"
- Released: 1964
- Genre: Ska
- Label: Blue Beat
- Songwriter: Prince Buster

"Al Capone" is a song and single by Jamaican singer-songwriter Prince Buster. It was first released in 1964.

== Background ==
At the time the song was written, many Jamaicans had a fascination with films from Hollywood, particularly gangster and Western films. Al Capone, the American gangster from the 1920s and 1930s, held a particular interest for Jamaican listeners. Primarily an instrumental, the song starts with the sound of a car crash, gun fire and squealing tyres. Buster's backing group, the All Stars, provide jazzy horns while piano playing keeps the rhythm. The recording session included Dennis Campbell and Val Bennett on tenor saxophones, Raymond Harper and Baba Brooks on trumpets, Junior Nelson on trombone, Ernest Ranglin on guitar and bass, Jah Jerry Haynes on guitar, Gladstone Anderson on piano and Drumbago (Arkland "Drumbago" Parks) on drums. The few lyrics are provided by Buster in an MC style.

== Chart success ==
The song did not become a hit until 1967, when Prince Buster's version reached No. 18 on the UK Singles Chart and remained there for 13 weeks. It achieved crossover success, as British youth adopted sunglasses, sharp suits, and other elements of Jamaican rude boy style as markers of identity.

== Legacy ==
The debut single by German disco-pop group Boney M., "Baby Do You Wanna Bump", was based on "Al Capone". Recorded in December 1974, the single was released in February 1975, becoming a hit in Belgium and the Netherlands. However, the single did not mention Prince Buster as a composer, instead billing the writers as producer Frank Farian and George Reyam.

AllMusic credits "Al Capone" with giving a sense of attitude to the 2 Tone movement, and as such, it was sampled by the Specials in their 1979 song "Gangsters". The B side was "One Step Beyond", also released on the 2 Tone label in 1979, by Madness. "Al Capone", when heard by a 15-year-old Suggs, had provided him with the inspiration which later went towards the formation of the group Madness, of which he was lead singer.
