= Loonee Tunes! =

Studio album by Bad Manners
- Released: November 1980
- Studio: Horizon Studios, Coventry; Pye Studios, London
- Genre: Ska, 2-Tone
- Label: Magnet
- Producer: Roger Lomas

Bad Manners chronology
Ska 'n' B (1980)	Loonee Tunes! (1980)	Gosh It's... Bad Manners (1981)

Singles from Loonee Tunes!
- 1. "Lorraine" Released: December 1980; 2. "Just a Feeling" Released: March 1981

Professional ratings
Review scores
Source	Rating
AllMusic	3/5 stars

Loonee Tunes! is the second album by British 2 Tone and ska band Bad Manners, from the year 1980. In keeping with the format of their first album, the first track is an instrumental. It reached number 36 on the UK album chart. The album opens with "Echo 4-2" which became the band's cult instrumental introduction number at all live gigs. The album's name is a reference to the popular Looney Tunes cartoon series.

== Track listing ==
All songs by Bad Manners unless noted.

1. "Echo 4-2" (L. Johnson)
2. "Just a Feeling"
3. "El Pussycat" (Roland Alphonso)
4. "Doris"
5. "Spy-I"
6. "Tequila" (The Champs)
7. "Lorraine"
8. "Echo Gone Wrong"
9. "Suicide"
10. "The Undersea Adventures of Ivor The Engine"
11. "Back in '60"
12. "Just Pretendin'"
- 2011 Bonus Tracks
1. "Lorraine" (Extended Version) – 6:20
2. "Here Comes The Major" (New Version) – 3:23

== Personnel ==
Bad Manners

- Buster Bloodvessel – vocals
- Louis "Alphonso" Cook – guitar
- David Farren – bass
- Martin Stewart – keyboards
- Chris Kane – saxophone
- Andrew Marson – saxophone
- Paul "Gus" Hyman – trumpet
- Winston Bazoomies – harmonica, vocals
