= Pluto Shervington =

Jamaican musical artist (1950–2024)

Background information
- Born: Leighton Keith Shervington; 13 August 1950; Saint Andrew Parish, Kingston, Jamaica
- Died: 19 January 2024 (aged 73) Miami, Florida, U.S.
- Genres: Reggae
- Occupations: Singer, musician, audio engineer, record producer
- Instruments: Vocals, bass guitar
- Years active: 1970–2024
- Labels: Opal, Trojan Records, KR Records

Leighton Keith "Pluto" Shervington (13 August 1950 – 19 January 2024) was a Jamaican reggae musician, singer, audio engineer, and record producer.

== Life and career ==
Leighton Keith Shervington was born in Saint Andrew Parish, Kingston, Jamaica, on 13 August 1950.

In 1966, at the age of 16, Shervington joined a band called The Presidents, leaving a year later to join The Hurricanes. He then moved on to join the showband Tomorrow's Children. Inspired by the success of Ernie Smith's "Duppy or a Gunman" and Tinga Stewart's "Play de Music", both delivered in heavy patois, he recorded in a similar style "Ram Goat Liver", inspiring Lee "Scratch" Perry to produce a popular version with Jimmy Riley. In 1972, after the disbanding of Tomorrow's Children, Shervington started a business called 'Sound Associates Limited', located in New Kingston, a recording studio which provided radio and television services for advertising agencies. He also wrote and produced jingles for most of the major advertising agencies, using a 16-track reel-to-reel recorder and a 24-track mixing board.

The follow-up single, "Dat" – about a Rastafarian trying to buy pork (without naming it aloud), contrary to his faith, so that he can afford marijuana – achieved considerable chart success internationally in 1976, reaching the number 6 in the UK Singles Chart. On 19 February 1976, Shervington appeared on video, performing the song, on BBC's Top of the Pops and appeared again later on 4 March. Trojan Records capitalized on this success by reissuing his first single, "Ram Goat Liver", which peaked just outside the top 40 in the UK.

"Your Honour" was another notable single for Shervington, a song in which a man is caught naked in a woman's closet by an angry husband. "I Man Born Ya" one of his most enduring hits, was recorded at Federal Records (now Tuff Gong) with musicians Val Douglas (bass), Willie Lindo (guitar), Wya Lindo (organ), Robbie Lyn (piano) and Mikey Boo (drums).

He also succeeded as a record producer, overseeing the creation of the 1975 song "Hooray Festival" performed by Roman Stewart, and "Midnight Rider" by Paul Davidson, which peaked at number 10 in the UK Singles Chart in December 1975. He co-produced "‘Dancing to My Own Heartbeat", a disco number one hit in Jamaica.

Shervington moved to Miami, Florida, in the summer of 1977. He continued to record, and reached the UK top 20 again when "Your Honour", originally recorded in 1975 but never previously released, was issued in early 1982, together with a new recording "No Honour Among Tiefs". In 1997, as a guest of honour on Ernie Smith's celebration of 30 years in the business, Shervington performed alongside Ken Lazarus and the surviving members of the Now Generation band at the Pegasus Hotel in Jamaica. Again, in 2001, alongside Ernie Smith, Shervington performed together with the music veteran Lloyd Charmers at the Heineken Startime events for an Independence Showcase, which also included performances from the Abyssinians and Eric Donaldson.

Shervington often performed live in Miami, and periodically returned to his homeland for performances. As of 2007 he played solo at Bahama Breeze in Kendall, Florida, and every other Sunday at Black Point Marina in Cutler Bay, with a five-piece band. He appeared at the St. Kitts Music Festival on 22 June 2007, sharing the bill with Steel Pulse and Sean Paul, among others.

In addition to his work as a singer, Shervington gained a reputation as a talented bass guitarist, and as a recording engineer, notably engineering Little Roy's 1974 album, Tafari Earth Uprising. From 2018, when not on tour, Shervington performed solo several times a week at the Bahama Breeze. His repertoire covered Bob Marley songs, a staple with the American audience, as well as other material ranging from the Eagles' "Hotel California" to calypso songs.

Shervington died at a hospital in Miami, Florida, on 19 January 2024, at the age of 73, from pneumonia-related complications. He had been hospitalized since the previous day. He had four sons, two daughters and two grandchildren.

== Awards ==
In 2004, Shervington was awarded the "Living Legend" award at King's House, Jamaica, along with Mighty Sparrow, Ernie Smith, David Rudder, Ken Lazarus and others. The band Pluto & Company was twice the recipient of the Caribbean Music Festival award for Florida's best Caribbean dance band.

== Selected discography ==
=== Albums ===
- Ramgoat (1974)
- Greatest Reggae Hits (1974)
- Pluto (1975)
- Play Mas' (1976)
- Ire Mas Rockers Carnival (1981)
- Again (1982)
- Reggae Fever (1982)
- Rhythm of the City (1990)
- Second Wind (2008)
- I Man Bitter (2012)

=== Singles ===
- "Dat" (1976) – UK Number 6
- "Ram Goat Liver" (1976) – UK Number 43
- "Your Honour" (1982) – UK Number 19

== See also ==
- List of reggae musicians
