= Walking in the Sunshine =

1981 single by Bad Manners

Single by Bad Manners

from the album Gosh It's... Bad Manners
- B-side: "End of the World"
- Released: 18 September 1981
- Genre: Ska; 2 tone
- Length: 3:26
- Label: Magnet
- Songwriter(s): Bad Manners
- Producer(s): Roger Lomas

Bad Manners singles chronology
"Can Can" (1981)	"Walking in the Sunshine" (1981)	"Drowning" / "Got No Brains" (1982)

"Walking in the Sunshine" is a song by British 2-tone/ska band Bad Manners, released in September 1981 as the second single from their third album Gosh It's... Bad Manners. It peaked at number 10 on the UK Singles Chart.

== Reception ==
Reviewing the song for Record Mirror, Sunie Fletcher wrote "Buster and the boys pull themselves out of their role as a second-rate Madness, only to emerge as… would you believe a third-rate UB40? The exuberance of their previous works has vanished, leaving behind a listless, limber reggae item which seems to drift on for far more than its three minutes 26 seconds". However, Ian Birch for Smash Hits wrote "It's amazing how Bad Manners can look so slobby and make such a sophisticated single. This is a dapper pop song with an ambling reggae gait and some fine instrumental breaks".

== Track listing ==
7": Magnet / MAG 197

1. "Walking in the Sunshine" – 3:26
2. "End of the World" – 2:57

12": Magnet / 12 MAG 197

1. "Walking in the Sunshine" (Extended Version) – 5:33
2. "End of the World" – 2:57
3. "Night Bus to Dalston" (Vocals Version) – 2:14

== Charts ==
Chart (1981)	Peak position
Ireland (IRMA)	11
UK Singles (OCC)	10
