= The Look (band) =

UK pop band

- Origin: Ely, Cambridgeshire, England
- Genres: New wave, pop
- Years active: 1979–1983; 2005–2006; 2012–present
- Labels: MCA, Towerbell, Angel Air
- Members: Jonny Whetstone; Gus Goad; Mick Bass; Trevor Walter
- Website: http://www.thelookmusic.com/

The Look are an English pop band, who had a number six hit single on the UK Singles Chart with "I Am the Beat" in 1980.

== Career ==
From Ely, Cambridgeshire and originally named The Kreed, the band changed their name to The Look when they moved to London. Their lead singer and frontman was Jonny Whetstone (born c. 1955). The band's 1980 debut single, "I Am the Beat" was a top 10 hit, peaking at No. 6 on the UK Singles Chart. After the less successful follow-up "Feeding Time" (No. 50, 1981), their third single "Tonight" failed to reach the charts. The singles, and self-titled album, were released on the MCA label. Further singles including "Three Steps Away" also missed the top 75. The group moved to Towerbell Records, an indie label. The Look disbanded in 1983.

They returned after a long absence in April 2005 with a new album, entitled Pop Yowlin', on Angel Air Records. It received a warm critical reception, including a rating of from AllMusic.

Gus Goad toured with Ian Hunter's Rant Band from 2000 to 2004 and also appeared on Never Mind the Buzzcocks in 2006 in the Identity Parade.

A new album, Tunes and Stories was released in 2012, featuring Alex Baird from the Jags on drums.

They had their first live show in seven years at The Water Rats in London on 26 March 2013, organised by GM Records Presents.

== Band members ==
- Jonny Whetstone – lead vocals, guitar
- Gus Goad – bass, guitar, backing vocals
- Mick Bass – guitar, keyboards, backing vocals
- Trevor Walter – drums
- Eryl Price-Davies keyboards, backing vocals – for live tours 1982–3

== Discography ==
=== Albums ===
- 1981: The Look
- 2005: Pop Yowlin'
- 2013: Tunes and Stories

=== Singles ===
- 1980: "I Am the Beat" – #6 UK #13 AUS
- 1981: "Feeding Time" – #50 UK
- 1981: "Tonight"
- 1981: "Three Steps Away"
- 1981: "Real Live Heaven"
- 1983: "Drumming Up Love"
