= Heavy Petting (TV series) =

- Starring: Paras Tomar
- Country of origin: India

Original release
- Network: NDTV Good Times

Heavy Petting is an Indian television show hosted by Paras Tomar on NDTV Good Times. It is India's only animal show. The anchor travels across the country meeting animal lovers and pet owners with a special focus on dogs. The show is sponsored by Pedigree Petfoods and has been one of the longest running show on NDTV Good Times. Heavy Petting- All stars, has featured actors including pet owners Zayed khan, Tusshar Kapoor, Divya Dutta and Shweta Salve.

== Host ==
Paras Tomar is a television anchor, radio jockey and a former journalist. While travel and youth shows have been his milieu, his work has been Bollywood-driven. He puts celebrities in a spot and parties with them. He has anchored shows on almost all of India's top television channels. On radio, he is the voice of the morning show for a Vancouver-based radio station and is also part of the team that set up a unique Southeast Asian station in Bahrain. He hosted radio shows on FM in India. The previous season hosted by Paras was called Heavy Petting=It's a dog's life as the anchor traveled across India to meet pet owners and their dogs of different sizes.

== Contents ==
The show emphasizes pet care, answering viewer queries about pet concerns and features a veterinarian. Each episode features one pet owner and delves into the lives of the pet and its family.

== Production ==
The show is produced by Dreamcatchers, a production company based in Mumbai and New Delhi. The show airs Sunday at 11 am and Saturdays at 18:30 hours Indian standard time.
