= Toyin Agbetu =

British African activist and musician

- Occupations: Social rights activist; lecturer; community educator; filmmaker
- Known for: Founder of the Pan-African group Ligali

Toyin Agbetu, also known as Oluwatoyin Agbetu, is a British Nigerian social rights activist, lecturer, community educator, musician and filmmaker, who founded in 2000 the Pan-African group Ligali.

== Westminster Abbey protest ==
On 27 March 2007, Agbetu staged a protest at a Westminster Abbey church service held to recognize the 200th anniversary of Great Britain's Abolition of the Slave Trade Act 1807. Queen Elizabeth II was in attendance at the commemorative event, which marked the British government's decision to end the Atlantic Slave Trade.

Agbetu slipped past security guards at the 2007 service and strode into the open area in front of the church altar, standing three metres away from the queen and shouting that the service was an insult to those of African heritage. In subsequent interviews he called the service a self-congratulatory exercise for those who promote oppression and those who continued to prevent the social and intellectual freedom of oppressed peoples. He shouted at the queen: "You should be ashamed. We should not be here. This is an insult to us. I want all the Christians who are Africans to walk out of here with me!" He threatened officials who were attempting to escort him away from the Queen shouting "I'll punch you out!" as he was removed from the church.

The Crown Prosecution Service advised that no charges be brought against him.

== Career ==
From late 2007, Agbetu wrote a weekly column called "Nyansapo" for the New Nation newspaper, and in 2009 started a weekly interactive community radio program called the Pan African Drum. He is also the author of publications that include Ukweli - A Political and Spiritual Basis for Pan Africanism (2010), Revoetry - Poems from an African British Perspective (2010) and The Manual: The Rules for Men (2002). He contributed towards the 2024 book Encounters with James Baldwin: Celebrating 100 years.

Having founded in 2000 the Ligali Organisation, with the aim of challenging negative media representations of the African British community, Agbetu in 2010 resigned as the head of Ligali to become its curator-administrator. While continuing to strive for a Pan-African voice for the oppressed. As described on its website (ligali.org), Ligali is "a Pan African, human rights focused, non-profit voluntary organisation. We work for the socio-political and spiritual empowerment of African people with heritage direct from Africa or indirectly via African diasporic communities, such as those in the Caribbean and South America."

Among Agbetu's additional initiatives are "The Stuff You Should Know", a project aimed at informing young people of their rights, the "No N Word" campaign (focusing on stopping the rampant use and negative reclamation of the "n word" in media and social institutions), and support for establishing a national "African Remembrance Day".

In 2014 he made the film Beauty Is..., which discusses answers to the question "What is beauty?" from an African perspective.

In February 2021, Agbetu was appointed to the Mayor of London's Commission for Diversity in the Public Realm. His resignation from the commission was announced on 25 February following accusations of antisemitism in previous statements. Agbetu was reported as stating: "I voluntarily decided to step back from the post before being asked, to help reduce the attacks on the important work of the commission, but I have no intention of letting such outrageous lies stand against me."

In September 2021, Agbetu became a lecturer in political and social anthropology at the University College London.
