= Bar Bodega =

Former bar in Wellington, New Zealand

Coordinates: 41°17′34″S 174°46′31″E

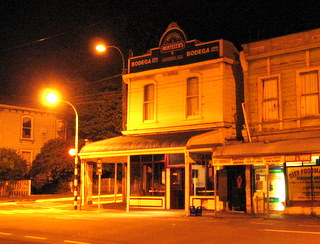
Original site of Bar Bodega

Bar Bodega is a former music venue in Wellington, New Zealand that closed in 2016. Founded in 1991, it originally occupied a house earmarked for demolition by Transit New Zealand to make way for an inner city motorway extension. Due to the continuing short-term nature of the lease, the venue continued to exist with a relatively makeshift appearance until 2001 when the motorway extension was finally started and the venue shifted into new premises on Ghuznee Street, a former Nestlé factory and warehouse. The old location was later purchased by restaurateurs Lorenzo and Leonardo Bresolin in 2014.

Bar Bodega was a music venue that substantially contributed to the alternative music scene in Wellington.

Virtually every New Zealand band played in this venue in the 1990s, very often in front of a very crowded house. Many local Wellington bands had regular spots there: The Gardening Angels, Letterbox Lambs, Breakfast of Champion, Jahailer and Let's Planet, to name a few.

Regular appearances by Chris Knox, Martin Phillipps and The Chills, Jean-Paul Sartre Experience, David Kilgour, The Renderers and many other household names of New Zealand music allowed the bar to gain popularity. The White Stripes played at Bodega on their first New Zealand tour in 2000.
