= Lip Up Fatty =

Single by Bad Manners

from the album Ska 'n' B
- B-side: "Night Bus to Dalston"
- Released: June 1980
- Studio: Ro-Lo Productions
- Genre: Ska
- Length: 2:49
- Label: Magnet Records
- Composer: Bad Manners
- Producer: Roger Lomas

Bad Manners singles chronology
"Ne-Ne Na-Na Na-Na Nu-Nu" (2/1980)	"Lip Up Fatty" (1980)	"Special Brew" (9/1980)

Official audio
- "Lip Up Fatty" on YouTube

"Lip Up Fatty" is a single released by British Two Tone and ska band Bad Manners in June 1980, which reached No. 15 in the UK Singles Chart. It is one of a number of songs by Bad Manners about "being fat", a reference to the round figure of frontman Buster Bloodvessel. According to Bloodvessel, "Lip Up Fatty" was an expression used at his school "to tell people to shut up". Its signature melodic lines were a simple but careful blend of brass instruments and lead harmonica theme, played by Alan Sayag (Winston Bazoomies).

During early live gigs and in the film Dance Craze, Alan Sayag sometimes played the harmonica part on a Hohner Echo Tremolo instrument.

In November 2012, Tim Armstrong recorded a version as a part of his Tim Timebomb and Friends project.
