= Blue Beat Records =

English record label that released Jamaican R&B and ska music

Blue Beat Records is an English record label that released Jamaican rhythm and blues (R&B) and ska music in the 1960s and later decades. Its reputation led to the use of the word bluebeat as a generic term to describe all styles of early Jamaican pop music, including music by artists not associated with the record label.

== History ==
The Blue Beat label was founded in 1960, in London, as an imprint of Emil E. Shalit's Melodisc Records. Melodisc, which was founded in London in 1947, specialised in releasing calypso and mento and imported American jazz music. The Blue Beat label focused on American-influenced Jamaican blues and R&B, which later evolved into ska, and was launched following the positive response in the United Kingdom to Laurel Aitken's Melodisc release of "Lonesome Lover". Shalit put Sigimund "Siggy" Jackson in charge of the label, and Jackson subsequently chose the name Blue Beat, which he said was an adaptation of "It sounds like blues and it's got a great beat" or "Blues Beat", which apparently was a generic term for Jamaican blues music at the time.

== The early years: 1960s and 1970s ==
The first release on the Blue Beat label was "Boogie Rock" by Laurel Aitken, which was licensed from Dada Tewari's Downbeat label. The Blue Beat label's distinctive blue covers and silver logo first appeared with the label's third release, "Manny Oh" by Higgs and Wilson. The Blue Beat label reached licensing agreements with the majority of major Jamaican producers and also released many home-produced recordings by Siggy Jackson, featuring English-based artists such as the Marvels. Even some Prince Buster hits, including "Wash-Wash", were recorded in London, and involved well-known UK musicians such as Georgie Fame. The Blue Beat label released around 400 singles and over a dozen albums between 1960 and 1967. Prince Buster became the Blue Beat label's biggest star, with songs such as "Al Capone".

Siggy Jackson established a Blue Beat night at the Marquee Club in London, and fashion accessories featuring the Blue Beat label's logo became popular. Many records on the Blue Beat label were played alongside soul music in dance clubs such as the Twisted Wheel in Manchester. In addition to appealing greatly to the West Indian community in the UK, the music became associated with the British mods of the early to mid-1960s, as well as the skinheads of the late 1960s. In the late 1960s and early 1970s, records on the Blue Beat label became highly collectable among those who regarded records like Prince Buster's "Al Capone" as classics.

When the ska rhythm slowed to rocksteady around 1966, Melodisc started a new sub-label, Fab, and the Blue Beat label stopped issuing new releases after 1967 (although the back catalogue continued to sell for several years). Jackson left to work for EMI, where he founded the Columbia Blue Beat label. The Blue Beat label was revived in 1972 for a short run of obscure releases including John Holt's "Ok Fred" and "Sad News" singles. as well as reissues of some of the popular classics from Prince Buster's catalogue such as Al Capone and Ten Commandments Of Man. Later in the decade some of these tunes were once again reissued in 12" single format to supply the new younger audience that emerged from the 2-Tone generation.

== 1980s and 1990s ==
In 1987, Buster Bloodvessel (of the 2 Tone ska revival band Bad Manners) and producer Ivan Healy Purvis started a brand new record label called Blue Beat Records and licensed the Blue Beat label name and logo. The label was run from a reclaimed riverboat named "The Bloodvessel", which was in Bloodvessel's backyard in Spring Hill. Between 1987 and 1990, this label released several records, including the Bad Manners album Return of The Ugly. The Bad Manners single "Skaville UK" was the last Blue Beat single to make an impact on the UK charts, reaching No. 87 in 1989.

== 21st century ==
In 2004, Siggy Jackson was approached by No.1 Station band leader Marcus Upbeat (a.k.a. Downbeat) with the idea of starting a revival of The Blue Beat Label. Together Siggy and Marcus released a series of 7-inch singles on the label in the style of The Blue Beat Label's 1960s output. These releases included six singles by No. 1 Station, which featured The Blue Beat Label veteran Eddie 'Tan-Tan' Thornton on trumpet and several guest vocalists, including The Marvels. Siggy Jackson re-issued several tracks from his own back catalogue, as well as one single each from ska revival band Intensified and veterans of The Blue Beat Label the Pyramids. Siggy also reissued two Laurel Aitken tracks, and a single by the Mopeds which had previously been issued on Columbia Blue Beat. These releases were all limited edition vinyl pressings. Siggy Jackson retired from the music industry in 2008. Marcus Upbeat then acquired The Blue Beat Label to continue with label's revival.

In 2011, Marcus Upbeat registered Blue Beat Records Ltd to continue The Blue Beat Label. and in 2011 released another new 7" single on The Blue Beat Label. Marcus then embraced the emerging and ever faster growing digital age for The Blue Beat Label. An exclusive digital distribution agreement for The Blue Beat Label was implemented and over the following years a few selective No.1 Station and other releases were made available for digital release on iTunes and other reputable digital outlets. The Blue Beat Label got a further reboot in 2019 with the re-release of a No. 1 station single She's So Sweet on 7 inch vinyl marcus upbeat re recorded this all on his own and the digital single released on The Blue Beat Label, and a new website featuring all the releases on the label over the past sixty years, alongside Marcus Upbeat agreeing a deal with Tipp Investments to acquire a stake in Blue Beat Records Ltd. It has been reported that the deal is due to complete during April 2020. The Blue Beat Label is still going independently as it reaches sixty.

== See also ==
- List of record labels
