= Special Brew (song) =

Single by Bad Manners

from the album Ska 'n' B
- B-side: "Ivor The Engine"
- Released: 12 September 1980
- Genre: Ska; 2-tone
- Length: 3:20; 3:37 (album version)
- Label: Magnet
- Songwriters: Bad Manners (Buster Bloodvessel, Louis Cook, David Farren, Paul Hyman, Chris Kane, Andrew Marson, Alan Sayag, Martin Stewart)
- Producer: Roger Lomas

Bad Manners singles chronology
"Lip Up Fatty" (1980)	"Special Brew" (1980)	"Lorraine" (1980)

"Special Brew" is a song by British 2-tone and ska band Bad Manners, released in September 1980 and was the third single from their first album Ska 'n' B. It was the band's joint biggest hit in the UK, reaching number 3 in the UK Singles Chart, where it stayed for two weeks. The song takes its inspiration from the Carlsberg lager Special Brew and is about someone who loves it like a significant other.

After the success of "Ne-Ne Na-Na Na-Na Nu-Nu", the band realised they needed to write more songs and so went to the local off-licence for inspiration. One of the ideas sounded "a bit soppy... a bit of a long song" to Buster Bloodvessel, which was not their style, so he picked up his beer and sang "I love you, yes i do 'cause i know that you're my special brew" and the song was then written in a matter of minutes.

The B-side song "Ivor The Engine" is named after the eponymous television series and was included on their second album Loonee Tunes!, titled "The Undersea Adventures of Ivor the Engine".

A limited-edition picture disc was also issued, with a picture of Bloodvessel licking his lips at a pint of Special Brew.

== Track listing ==
7"

1. "Special Brew" – 3:20
2. "Ivor The Engine" – 2:25

== Charts ==
=== Weekly charts ===
Chart (1980)	Peak position
Ireland (IRMA)	4
UK Singles (OCC)	3

=== Year-end charts ===
Chart (1980)	Position
UK Singles (Official Charts Company)	42
