= Bad Manners =

British 2-tone ska band

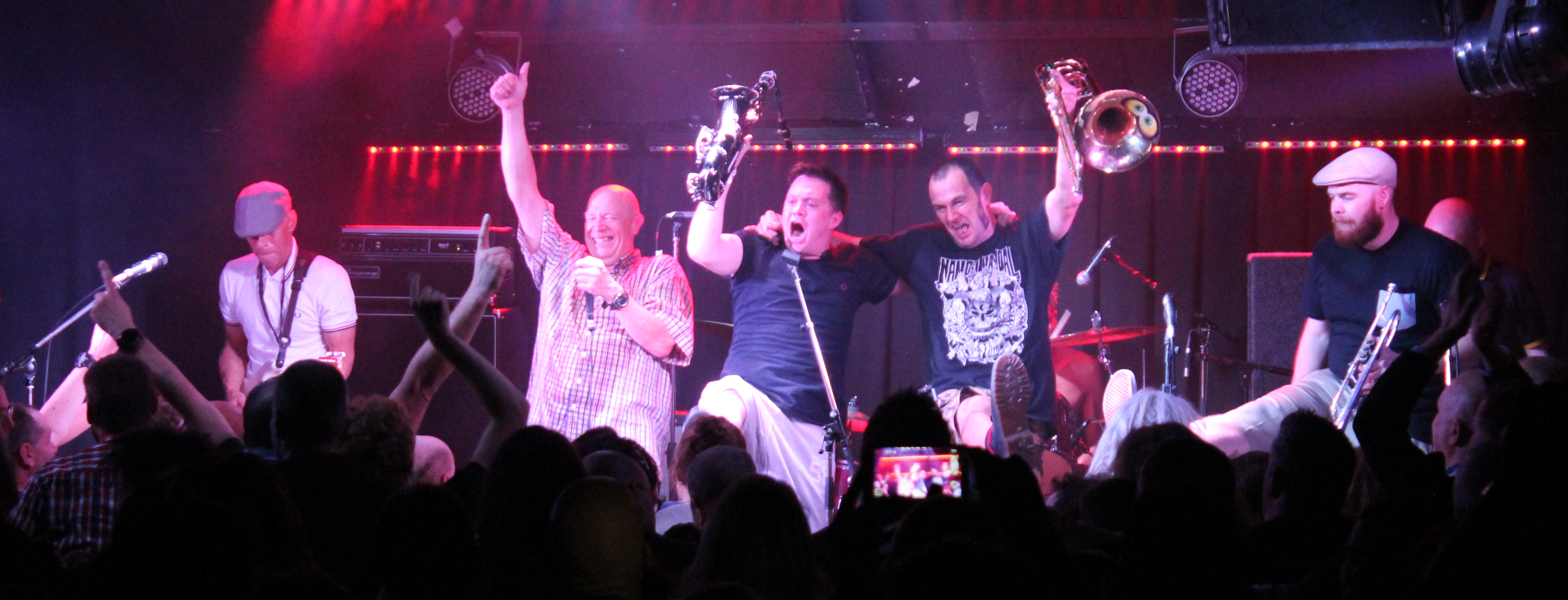
- Bad Manners performing at Bodega in Wellington, New Zealand, 2015

Background information
- Origin: London, England
- Genres: Ska; two-tone
- Works: Discography
- Years active: 1978–present
- Labels: Magnet; Portrait; Blue Beat; Pork Pie; Moon Ska World; Bad
- Members: Buster Bloodvessel; Leroy Smith; Matt Bilton; Adrian Cox; Tony Richardson; Lee Thompson; Richie Downs; Matt Goodwin; Matt Bane; Colin Graham; David Turner; Russell Wynn
- Past members: Winston Bazoomies; Louis "Alphonso" Cook; David Farren; Brian Tuitt; Ian Clarke; Martin Stewart; Paul "Gus" Hyman; Chris Kane; Andrew Marson; Marcus Bush; Nick Welsh; Terry Whitten; Jerry Tremaine; Jimmy Scott; Alan Perry; Tony "Rico" Richardson; Matty "Bingo" Bane; Andy Perriss; Colin Graham; Justin Dodsworth; Dave "Essex" Welton; Art Zamora; Mark Farmer; Tom Massey; Mark Hamilton; David Edwards; Chris Rand; Sam Adams; Stuart Garside; Chris Bull; Adrian Cox; Simon Cuell

Bad Manners are an English two-tone and ska band led by frontman Buster Bloodvessel. Early appearances included Top of the Pops (TOTP) and the live film documentary Dance Craze (1981).

They were at their most popular during the early 1980s, during a period when other ska revival bands such as Madness, the English Beat, the Specials and the Selecter filled the charts. Bad Manners spent 111 weeks in the UK singles chart between 1980 and 1983, and they also achieved chart success with their first four studio albums, with Ska 'n' B (1980), Loonee Tunes! (1980), and Gosh It's ... Bad Manners (1981) being their biggest hits.

== Formation ==
Fronted by Buster Bloodvessel (real name Douglas Trendle), the band was formed in 1976, while most of the members were together at Woodberry Down Comprehensive School, near Manor House, North London. They commemorated the 1981 closure of the school on the back sleeve of their album, Gosh It's ... Bad Manners, released that year.

== Career ==
Early versions of the band date back to 1976 but Bad Manners were formed and played their first ever gig in January 1978. Dougie Trendle (Buster Bloodvessel), Alan Sayag (Winston Bazoomies), David Farren, Brian Tuitt, Paul Hyman (Gus 'Hot Lips' Herman) and Louis Alphonso were all at school together. Martin Stewart, Chris Kane and Andrew Marson would join later.

After becoming popular in their native London, Bad Manners signed a recording contract with Magnet Records in 1980, and became regular guests on television shows such as Tiswas. The band also appeared on The British Music Awards (1981) and Cheggers Plays Pop. In 1985, they appeared on The Time of Your Life, hosted by Noel Edmonds. Being closely associated with the 2 Tone movement (though never signed to 2 Tone Records itself), they were one of six bands featured in the 1981 documentary film Dance Craze.

Some of their hit singles through the 1980s include "Nee Nee Na Na Na Na Nu Nu", "My Girl Lollipop", "Lip Up Fatty", "Can Can", "Special Brew", "Walking in the Sunshine" and "That'll Do Nicely".

One of the main reasons for their notoriety was their outlandish huge-tongued and shaven-headed frontman, Buster Bloodvessel. His manic exploits got them banned from the British BBC TV chart show Top of the Pops, for painting his head red. The band was also banned from Italian TV after Bloodvessel mooned a concert audience on live television at the Sanremo Music Festival 1981, later being told that the Pope was watching on television.

Bad Manners had spent 111 weeks in the UK Singles Chart between 1980 and 1983, however, Bad Manners left Magnet Records in 1983, and joined Telstar Records releasing a compilation album, The Height of Bad Manners, which reached number 23 in the UK Albums Chart. The album was assisted with a television advertisement, and it brought the band back to the attention of the media and the British public – but no further chart hits.

The group then went on to sign a contract with Portrait Records in the United States and Mental Notes was released in 1985. For two years the band toured continuously all over the world but decided to disband in 1987.

== Break-up and reformation ==
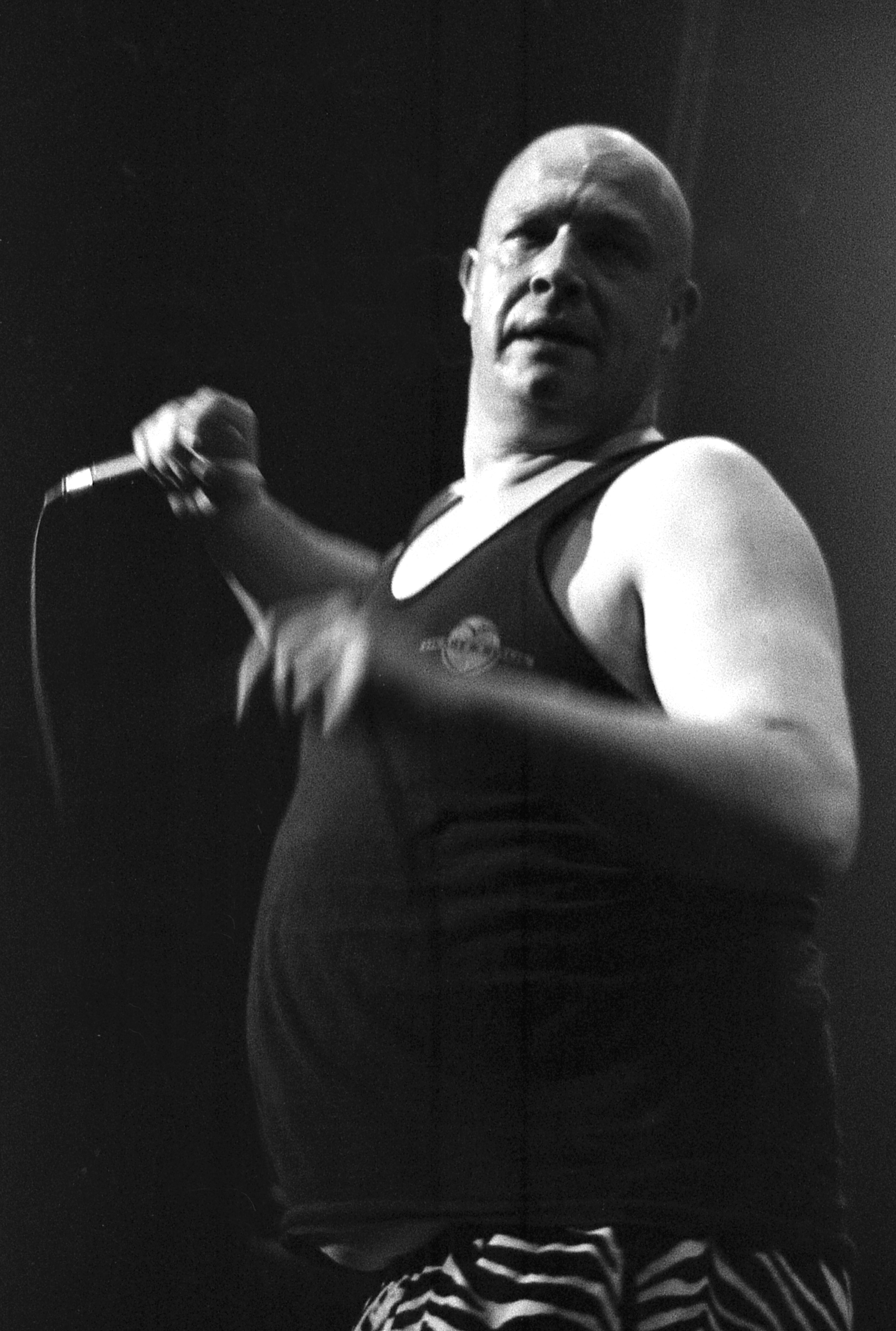
Buster Bloodvessel performing with Bad Manners at Club Citta, Japan, 1991

After Bad Manners disbanded for a brief spell after their deal with Portrait Records ended, Buster Bloodvessel formed a new outfit called Buster's Allstars in 1987, which enabled him and a few of his friends to continue performing in and around London. The capital's venues were often packed to capacity and this prompted the then 20 stone vocalist to reform Bad Manners with his fellow original members Louis Alphonso, Martin Stewart, Winston Bazoomies and Chris Kane. During 1988, the revamped Bad Manners band line-up started to play a number of shows at universities and at scooter rallies and they licensed the name and logo of Blue Beat Records, setting up office inside a 50-foot (15 m) barge called the Blood Vessel in the back garden of Buster Bloodvessel's former home in London.

After Blue Beat became defunct in 1990, Bad Manners were without a recording contract, but continued to tour. In 1992, they signed a deal with Pork Pie Records and Fat Sound was released in Europe. The album was originally intended to be released in the UK on Blue Beat.

In 1996, Buster Bloodvessel moved to Margate and opened a hotel on the seafront called Fatty Towers, which catered for people with huge appetites. While living in Margate, he was a regular spectator at Margate F.C., and Bad Manners sponsored the club for one season. Fatty Towers closed in 1998 and did not re-open despite a facelift. After its closure, Buster Bloodvessel moved back to London.

After five years without releasing any new material, Bad Manners issued their Heavy Petting album in 1997. Six years later, Buster set up another record label and the band released Stupidity on Bad Records in 2003.

In 2004, Bad Manners appeared on Never Mind the Buzzcocks in the Christmas Special, performing festive songs to the contestants which included Phill Jupitus and Noddy Holder (Jupitus is a fan of the band, and Buster Bloodvessel had appeared as a panellist on the show earlier that year).

Buster Bloodvessel is the only original member to remain in Bad Manners, but the harmonica player, Winston Bazoomies, was an 'honorary member' of the band. Bazoomies had a Facebook fanpage set up in his honour and lived in North London.

Martin Stewart left Bad Manners in 1991, and performed and recorded with the Selecter for fifteen years. He now lives in Middlesex with his family, and most recently played the keyboards in a band called the Skatalysts. Louis Alphonso lives in Paris and released his A Noir solo studio album on the French Fries record label in 2015, while his fellow musician, David Farren, left in 1987 after the band's contract with Portrait Records ended. Farren designed the original band logo, and painted the front cover of the album Gosh It's ... Bad Manners (1981). Chris Kane is a session musician. He became a music teacher during the 1990s and also performed with the Jordanaires after leaving Bad Manners. Brian Tuitt also left the band in 1987 and lives in Kent. The drummer has been performing with Ben Russell & the Charmers in recent times while also working with the Barry White Unlimited Love Tour at various venues in the UK, while Andrew Marson, who also left the group the same year, has worked as a carpenter and also performs in a country and western outfit called the Drawbacks. Paul Hyman, another original member who left the band in the late 1980s, lives in Enfield and works in the London Stock Exchange, an occupation he has had since leaving Bad Manners.

Bad Manners headlined their own annual music festival known as Bad Fest in 2005 and 2006 at RAF Twinwood Farm. This festival featured ska, mod-related and punk rock bands from the 1980s to the present.

In 2011, Cherry Red Records released the band's first four studio albums, Ska 'n' B (1980), Loonee Tunes! (1980), Gosh It's ... Bad Manners (1981) and Forging Ahead (1982) on CD for the first time with added bonus tracks. The albums were issued on their sister label, Pressure Drop.

In December 2012, the band released their first single in thirteen years. "What Simon Says" was released via download just before the festive season, and the music video featured Bad Manners fans from across the world but none of the band members themselves. The song hints at the power Simon Cowell has within the UK music industry.

In December 2012, founding members of the band met for the first time in decades at the Ship public house in Soho, London. Paul Hyman, Martin Stewart, Brian Tuitt and Chris Kane met with band historian and harmonica player David Turner, and Christopher 'Dell' Wardell, a music writer and promoter from Darlington. On 18 July 2013, seven of the original nine members reunited at The Brownswood public house, near Finsbury Park, that is within striking distance of their old school, Woodbery Down Comprehensive. The 'Bad Manners Originals' who attended the reunion were Andy Marson (alto sax), Paul Hyman (trumpet), Winston Bazoomies (Alan Sayag) (harmonicas), Chris Kane (tenor sax), David Farren (bass), Martin Stewart (keyboards) and Brian Tuitt (drums). The meetings were arranged after Wardell's 'Where Are They Now?' article was published in The Northern Echo in 2012, providing details on the current whereabouts of all of the original band members.

During 2016, Bad Manners toured the United Kingdom to celebrate their 40th Anniversary.

Original member Winston Bazoomies died on 1 December 2022, at the age of 63.

The band are still touring the United Kingdom in 2025.

== Discography ==
- Ska 'n' B (1980)
- Loonee Tunes! (1980)
- Gosh It's ... Bad Manners (1981)
- Forging Ahead (1982)
- Mental Notes (1985)
- Return of the Ugly (1989)
- Fat Sound (1992)
- Don't Knock the Baldhead! (1997)
- Stupidity (2001)
