= Nee Nee Na Na Na Na Nu Nu =

Single by Dicky Doo and the Don'ts
- B-side: "Flip Top Box"
- Released: 1958
- Genre: Instrumental rock Novelty
- Length: 2:07
- Label: Swan
- Songwriters: Eddie Deane & Al Dredick

Dicky Doo and the Don'ts singles chronology
"Click-Clack" (1957)	"Nee Nee Na Na Na Na Nu Nu" (1958)	""Leave Me Alone (Let Me Cry)" (1958)

"Nee Nee Na Na Na Na Nu Nu" is a song released in 1958 by Dicky Doo and the Don'ts. Aside from the nonsense syllables of the title, which are repeated three times, it is an instrumental. "Nee Nee Na Na Na Na Nu Nu" reached No. 40 on the Billboard "Top 100 Sides", while reaching No. 42 on Billboard's chart of "Best Selling Pop Singles in Stores".

In 1980, a version titled "Ne-Ne Na-Na Na-Na Nu-Nu" was released by Bad Manners, which spent 14 weeks on the UK Singles Chart, reaching No. 28.
