= Buster Bloodvessel =

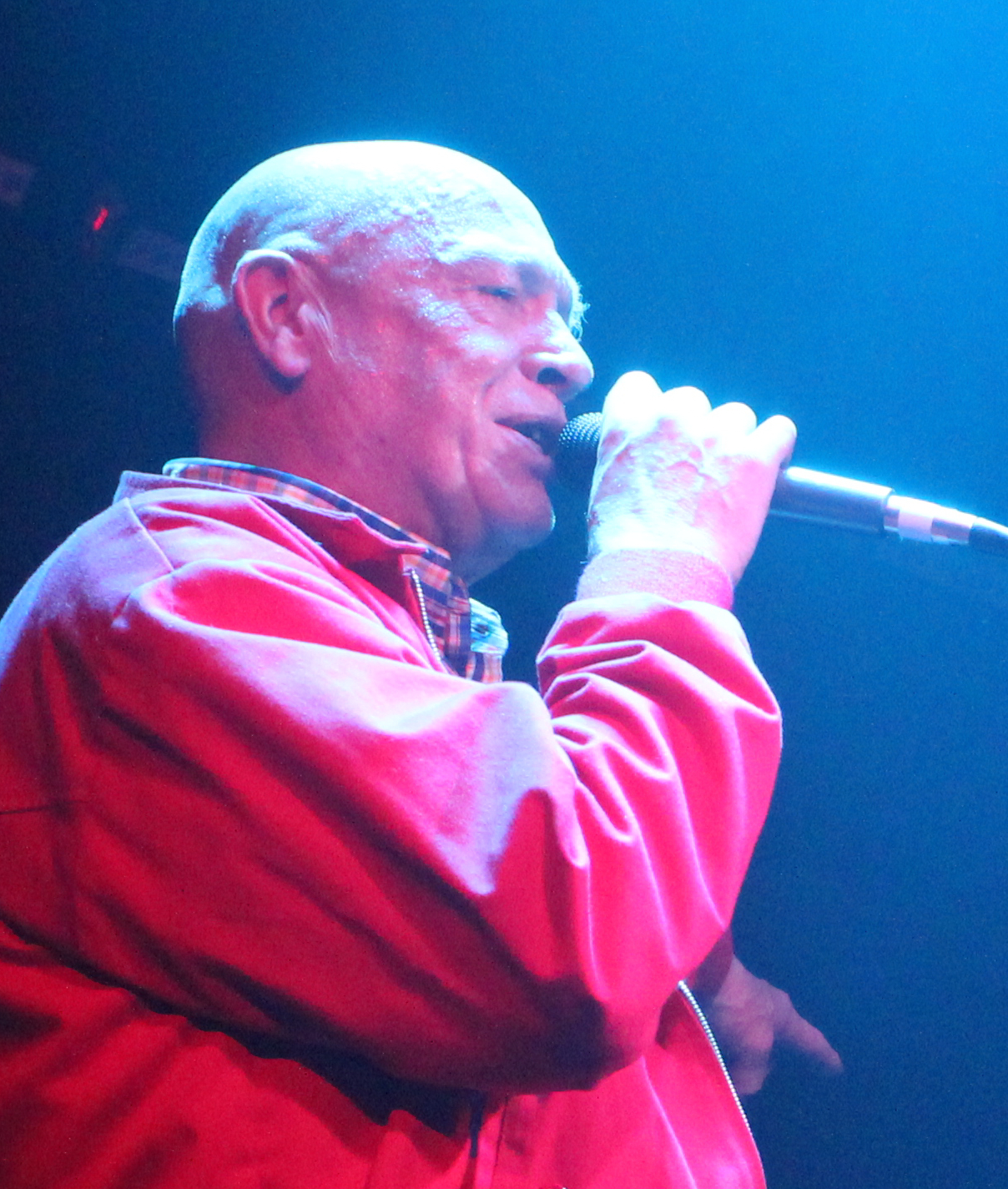
- Bloodvessel, 2015

Background information
- Born: Douglas Steven Woods; 6 September 1958 (age 68); London, England
- Genres: Ska; two-tone
- Occupation: Singer
- Instrument: Vocals
- Years active: 1976–present
- Member of: Bad Manners

Douglas Steven Trendle (born 6 September 1958), better known as Buster Bloodvessel, is an English singer who has been the frontman of the two-tone band Bad Manners since forming the band in 1976. He took his stage name from the bus conductor played by Ivor Cutler in the Beatles' 1967 film Magical Mystery Tour.

== Personal life ==
Bloodvessel once owned a hotel in Margate called Fatty Towers, which specifically catered for larger customers with features such as extra large beds and baths as well as fatty meals. The hotel closed in 1998 and Bloodvessel moved back to London. He often appears as a guest on various television shows, as well as in the tabloid newspapers. He was the main sponsor of football team Margate F.C. in the 1990s.

In early 2001, Bloodvessel was taken ill with a strangulated hernia during a concert in Perugia, Italy. He wanted to return to England, but was advised to have an operation in Italy, even though it would have been extremely dangerous due to his weight.

Bloodvessel has struggled with morbid obesity and underwent laparoscopic gastric bypass surgery in 2004, with his weight dropping from 31 stone (196.86 kg; 434 lbs) to 13 stone (82.6 kg; 182 lbs). Bloodvessel is married with two children.
