= The Selecter discography =

- Studio albums: 17
- EPs: 6
- Live albums: 14
- Compilation albums: 20
- Singles: 19
- Video albums: 1

This is the discography of British ska revival band The Selecter.

== Albums ==
=== Studio albums ===
| Year | Title | Details | Peak chart positions | | | | | | |
| Year | Title | Details | UK | AUS | CAN | NL | NOR | NZ | US |
|---|---|---|---|---|---|---|---|---|---|
| 1980 | Too Much Pressure | Released: 15 February 1980; Label: 2 Tone, Chrysalis; Formats: LP, MC | 5 | 77 | 85 | 43 | 37 | 24 | 175 |
| 1981 | Celebrate the Bullet | Released: 27 February 1981; Label: Chrysalis; Formats: LP, MC | 41 | — | — | — | — | — | — |
| 1994 | The Happy Album | Released: July 1994; Label: Demon; Formats: CD | — | — | — | — | — | — | — |
| 1995 | Pucker! | Released: 22 August 1995; Label: Dojo; Formats: CD; Released in the US by Triple X as Hairspray | — | — | — | — | — | — | — |
| 1999 | Cruel Britannia | Released: 23 February 1999; Label: Madfish, Snapper Music; Formats: CD | — | — | — | — | — | — | — |
| 1999 | The Trojan Songbook | Released: 29 October 1999; Label: Receiver; Formats: CD | — | — | — | — | — | — | — |
| 2000 | Kingston Affair | Released: 2000; Label: Moon Ska; Formats: CD; With Dave Barker | — | — | — | — | — | — | — |
| 2000 | The Trojan Songbook – Volume 2 | Released: June 2000; Label: Receiver; Formats: CD | — | — | — | — | — | — | — |
| 2001 | The Trojan Songbook – Volume 3 | Released: March 2001; Label: Receiver; Formats: CD | — | — | — | — | — | — | — |
| 2002 | Acoustic – Unplugged for the Rude Boy Generation | Released: 23 July 2002; Label: Mapps Cafe; Formats: CD | — | — | — | — | — | — | — |
| 2004 | Acoustic – Requiem for a Black Soul | Released: 2 February 2004; Label: Charly; Formats: CD | — | — | — | — | — | — | — |
| 2011 | Made in Britain | Released: 4 September 2011; Label: Vocaphone; Formats: CD, LP, digital download | — | — | — | — | — | — | — |
| 2013 | String Theory | Released: 24 February 2013; Label: Vocaphone; Formats: CD, LP, digital download | — | — | — | — | — | — | — |
| 2015 | Subculture | Released: 15 June 2015; Label: DMF; Formats: CD, LP, digital download | 54 | — | — | — | — | — | — |
| 2017 | Daylight | Released: 6 October 2017; Label: DMF; Formats: CD, LP, digital download | 66 | — | — | — | — | — | — |
| 2023 | Human Algebra | Released: 21 April 2023; Label: DMF; Format: LP | — | — | — | — | — | — | — |
"—" denotes releases that did not chart or were not released in that territory.

=== Live albums ===
| Year | Title | Details |
|---|---|---|
| 1992 | Out on the Streets | Released: 24 February 1992; Label: Receiver; Formats: CD, LP, MC |
| 1992 | BBC Radio 1 Live in Concert | Released: 21 December 1992; Label: Windsong International; Formats: CD; Split album with the Specials |
| 1996 | Live Injection | Released: February 1996; Label: Blue Moon, Magnum America; Formats: CD |
| 1996 | Live at Roskilde Festival | Released: December 1996; Label: Blue Moon, Magnum America; Formats: CD |
| 1997 | Greatest Hits Live | Released: 1997; Label: Emporio; Formats: CD, MC |
| 1998 | I Want Justice – Live | Released: January 1998; Label: Receiver; Formats: CD |
| 1998 | Live | Released: 1998; Label: E2; Formats: CD |
| 1999 | The Selecter Live! | Released: 21 October 1999; Label: Meldac; Formats: CD; Japan-only release |
| 1999 | My Perfect World – Live | Released: November 1999; Label: Receiver; Formats: CD |
| 2012 | Live in Britain | Released: 4 October 2012; Label: Vocaphone; Formats: CD, LP, digital download |
| 2015 | Get on the Train to Skaville | Released: 29 June 2015; Label: Secret; Formats: CD+DVD, digital download |
| 2015 | Access All Areas | Released: 25 September 2015; Label: Demon; Formats: CD+DVD, digital download |
| 2018 | Live at the Roundhouse | Released: 8 June 2018; Label: DMF; Formats: CD+DVD, 2×LP+DVD, digital download |
| 2021 | Live in Coventry '79 | Released: 12 June 2021; Label: 2 Tone; Formats: LP; Record Store Day limited release |
| 2023 | Live At The NEC 1980 | Released: 22 April 2023; Label: Chrysalis Catalog; Formats: LP (clear vinyl); Record Store Day limited release |

=== Compilation albums ===
| Year | Title | Details |
|---|---|---|
| 1989 | Selected Selecter Selections | Released: July 1989; Label: Chrysalis; Formats: CD, MC; US-only release |
| 1994 | Rare | Released: October 1994; Label: Dojo; Formats: CD |
| 1994 | Prime Cuts | Released: April 1994; Label: Blue Moon, Magnum America; Formats: CD; As Pauline Black and the Selecter |
| 1995 | Prime Cuts Vol. 2 | Released: October 1995; Label: Blue Moon, Magnum America; Formats: CD; As the Selecter featuring Pauline Black |
| 1995 | Rare Volume Two | Released: 1995; Label: Dojo; Formats: CD |
| 1995 | Rare Volume Three – Versions | Released: 1995; Label: Dojo; Formats: CD |
| 1996 | On My Radio | Released: 19 March 1996; Label: Dojo; Formats: CD; US-only release |
| 1996 | Greatest Hits | Released: 13 May 1996; Label: EMI; Formats: CD |
| 1996 | Back Out on the Streets | Released: 10 September 1996; Label: Triple X; Formats: CD; US-only release |
| 1997 | Selecterized – The Best of the Selecter 1991–1996 | Released: 1997; Label: Dojo; Formats: CD |
| 1997 | On My Radio | Released: May 1997; Label: Recall 2cd; Formats: 2×CD |
| 1997 | The Collection | Released: 24 June 1997; Label: Cleopatra; Formats: CD; US-only release |
| 1997 | The Very Best of the Selecter | Released: August 1997; Label: Triple X; Formats: CD; US-only release |
| 1998 | BBC Sessions/Live at the Paris Theatre '79 | Released: October 1998; Label: EMI; Formats: CD |
| 1999 | Too Much Pressure | Released: July 1999; Label: Harry May, Go-Feet; Formats: CD, LP |
| 2003 | Real to Reel | Released: November 2003; Label: Captain Mod; Formats: CD |
| 2004 | Three Minute Hero – Live & Studio Sessions 1983–2000 | Released: 4 October 2004; Label: Shakedown; Formats: 2×CD+DVD |
| 2004 | Street Feeling | Released: 27 December 2004; Label: Trojan, Castle Music; Formats: 2×CD |
| 2010 | Selecter-Matic | Released: 17 May 2010; Label: Secret; Formats: CD, digital download |
| 2013 | Indie Singles Collection 1991–96/Greatest Hits Live | Released: 22 July 2013; Label: BADfish; Formats: CD, digital download |
| 2018 | Best of Live at Dingwalls London | Released: 23 March 2018; Label: Secret; Formats: LP, digital download; Selection of tracks from Get on the Train to Skaville |

=== Video albums ===
| Year | Title | Details |
|---|---|---|
| 2003 | Live from London | Released: 9 December 2003; Label: Secret Films; Medium: DVD |

== EPs ==
| Year | Title | Details | Peak chart positions |
| Year | Title | Details | UK |
|---|---|---|---|
| 1980 | James Bond | Released: January 1980; Label: 2 Tone; Formats: 12-inch; Japan promo-only release | — |
| 1993 | The 2 Tone EP | Released: 27 September 1993; Label: 2 Tone; Formats: CD, MC, 7-inch; Split EP with other 2 Tone Records artists | 30 |
| 1994 | Madness EP | Released: April 1994; Label: Ax-S; Formats: CD; Featuring Prince Buster & Rico | — |
| 1995 | Hairspray | Released: August 1995; Label: Dojo; Formats: CD | — |
| 1996 | Too Much Pressure '96 | Released: 1996; Label: Dojo; Formats: CD | — |
| 2013 | Daytrotter Session | Released: 29 October 2013; Label: Daytrotter; Formats: digital download | — |
"—" denotes releases that did not chart or were not released in that territory.

== Singles ==
| Year | Single | Peak chart positions | | | | | Album |
| Year | Single | UK | BEL | IRE | NL | US Dance | Album |
|---|---|---|---|---|---|---|---|
| 1979 | "Gangsters" (by the Special A.K.A.) / "The Selecter" (by the Selecter) | 6 | 6 | 27 | 11 | — | Non-album single |
| 1979 | "On My Radio" (b/w "Too Much Pressure") | 8 | 8 | — | 13 | — 86 | Too Much Pressure |
| 1980 | "Three Minute Hero" | 16 | — | — | — | — | Too Much Pressure |
| 1980 | "Missing Words" | 23 | — | — | 32 | — | Too Much Pressure |
| 1980 | "The Whisper" | 36 | — | — | — | — | Non-album single |
| 1981 | "Celebrate the Bullet" | — | — | — | — | — | Celebrate the Bullet |
| 1981 | "Facing Situations" (Spain-only release) | — | — | — | — | — | Celebrate the Bullet |
| 1991 | "On My Radio '91" | — | — | — | — | — | Non-album single |
| 2011 | "Big in the Body, Small in the Mind" | — | — | — | — | — | Made in Britain |
| 2011 | "Back to Black" (promo-only release) | — | — | — | — | — | Made in Britain |
| 2011 | "A Christmas Fable" | — | — | — | — | — | Non-album single |
| 2015 | "Box Fresh" (promo-only release) | — | — | — | — | — | Subculture |
| 2015 | "It Never Worked Out" (promo-only release) | — | — | — | — | — | Subculture |
| 2015 | "Walk the Walk" | — | — | — | — | — | Subculture |
| 2016 | "Side to Side" (by the Beat feat. Ranking Roger) / "Breakdown" (by the Selecter; limited edition release) | — | — | — | — | — | Bounce / Subculture |
| 2017 | "Taking Back Control" (promo-only release) | — | — | — | — | — | Daylight |
| 2017 | "Frontline" | — | — | — | — | — | Daylight |
| 2017 | "Daylight" (promo-only release) | — | — | — | — | — | Daylight |
| 2017 | "The Big Badoof" (promo-only release) | — | — | — | — | — | Daylight |
| 2023 | "Not In Love With Love (Dub Mix)" / "War War War (Original Dub Mix)" | — | — | — | — | — | Human Algebra |
"—" denotes releases that did not chart or were not released in that territory.
