= Gaps Hendrickson =

- Born: 29 April 1951; Saint Kitts and Nevis
- Origin: Coventry, England
- Died: 11 June 2024 (aged 73) Coventry, England
- Genres: ska
- Instrument: Vocals
- Years active: 1979–2024
- Formerly of: The Selecter

Arthur "Gaps" Hendrickson (29 April 1951 – 11 June 2024) was a Saint Kitts and Nevis-born British singer. He was best known for being an original member of The Selecter.

== Early life ==
Hendrickson was born in Saint Kitts and Nevis, the eldest of eight children. His parents moved to the United Kingdom when he was a child, and he was raised by his grandmother, an ice cream seller, who took him to a cane field an hour before school to cut cane. When he was twelve, he and one of his brothers was sent up by their parents to move to the UK, where their father was working for Vauxhall Motors in Luton, where Gaps eventually worked at as well. Due to a mix-up, no-one was there at the harbour to meet up with the two.

After arriving in Southampton, Hendrickson attended Beech Hill High School, and during his teenage years, he would travel to Coventry to expierence the city. Hendrickson was given the nickname "Gaps/Gappa" by his friends to "deflect police harassment", with him saying: "We would be coming home from a blues [party] and they would pick us up and take us to the police station, we gave each other a nickname like ‘Mule’ and ‘Sugar’, and mine was ‘Gappa’."

== Career ==
While visiting Coventry, he witnessed Desmond Brown and Lynval Golding performing in a band called Cool Interrogators, and according to Hendrickson: "I had a serious talk with myself: Is this what you want to do for the rest of your life, go to bed, get up and go to work?" He then announced to his family that he would be moving to Coventry to work in bands, and after his family replied with "See you in six weeks when your money runs out.", Gaps replied "The next time you see me I’ll be on television."

Gaps joined The Selecter after hanging around Holyhead Youth Centre. The Selecter originally started as a solo project by guitarist/singer Neol Davies, but after gaining a big reception, wanted to expand the band. When Gaps joined, the band was Davies (guitar), Compton Amanor (guitar), Charley Anderson (bass), Desmond Brown (who had inspired Gaps to move to Coventry; organ), James Mackie (organ), and Charley 'Aitch' Bembridge (drums), with Pauline Black later joining on vocals. They signed on to 2 Tone Records, and recorded the album Too Much Pressure, which sold 300,000 copies. While recording lead vocals for the title track of the album, a disagreement arose when Hendrickson refused to sing the line "Dem a fuck up my woman", and insisted on replacing the profanity with "fumble", something which songwriter Davies was still upset about decades later.

The Selecter reformed in 1991, but Hendrickson did not join full-time, instead performing occasional gigs between the mid to late 1990s. In 2010, Black reformed the group with Hendrickson as a full-time member. At the time of his death, the band still consisted of him and Black, as well as original drummer Charley Bembridge who rejoined after a nearly four-decade departure in 2021. He occasionally performed on stage with local Coventry bands, including Special Brew and also worked as a security guard in the city.

== Death ==
Hendrickson died in Coventry from cancer in the early of 11 June 2024 at the age of 73. He was diagnosed with cancer in 2023, and after a tour with Jools Holland and his Rhythm & Blues Orchestra in winter 2023, Gaps stepped down from touring, shortly before his death. He was survived by seven children from four different relationships.
