= Dance Craze =

1981 film

- Video cover for Dance Craze
- Directed by: Joe Massot
- Produced by: Gavrik Losey
- Starring: Buster Bloodvessel; Suggs; Jerry Dammers; Terry Hall
- Edited by: Ben Rayner; Anthony Sloman
- Distributed by: Nu Image Films
- Release dates: February 1981 (UK); 23 April 1982 (US)
- Running time: 85 min
- Country: United Kingdom
- Language: English

Dance Craze is a 1981 documentary film about the British 2 Tone music genre.

The film was directed by Joe Massot, who originally wanted to do a film only about the band Madness, whom he met during their first US tour. Massot later changed his plans to include the whole 2 Tone movement. The film, shot in 1980, comprised performance footage of Madness, The Specials, The Selecter, The Bodysnatchers, the Beat and Bad Manners on tour throughout the United Kingdom. A soundtrack album of the same name was released the same year, featuring fifteen of the songs that were featured in the film. Later versions of the soundtrack album do not contain the Madness tracks, adding tracks credited to the Special AKA, a later incarnation of the Specials.

In 2023, Dance Craze returned to cinemas, and was released on Blu-ray and DVD.

== Songs ==
1. "Nite Klub" – The Specials
2. "The Prince" – Madness
3. "Ne-Ne-Na-Na-Na-Na-Nu-Nu" – Bad Manners
4. "007 (Shanty Town)" – The Bodysnatchers
5. "Three Minute Hero" – The Selecter
6. "Ranking Full Stop" – The Beat
7. "Big Shot" – The Beat
8. "Concrete Jungle" – The Specials
9. "Swan Lake" – Madness
10. "Razor Blade Alley" – Madness
11. "Missing Words" – The Selecter
12. "Let's Do the Rock Steady" – The Bodysnatchers
13. "Lip Up Fatty" – Bad Manners
14. "Madness" – Madness
15. "Too Much Too Young" – The Specials
16. "On My Radio" – The Selecter
17. "Easy Life" – The Bodysnatchers
18. "Rough Rider" – The Beat
19. "Man at C&A" – The Specials
20. "Inner London Violence" – Bad Manners
21. "Night Boat to Cairo" – Madness
22. "Twist and Crawl" – The Beat
23. "Wooly Bully" – Bad Manners
24. "Too Much Pressure" – The Selecter
25. "Mirror in the Bathroom" – The Beat
26. "One Step Beyond" – Madness
27. "Nite Klub" – The Specials

== Soundtrack LP ==
Side One

1. "Concrete Jungle" – The Specials
2. "Mirror in the Bathroom" – The Beat
3. "Lip Up Fatty" – Bad Manners
4. "Razor Blade Alley" – Madness
5. "Three Minute Hero" – The Selecter
6. "Easy Life" – The Bodysnatchers
7. "Big Shot" – The Beat
8. "One Step Beyond" – Madness

Side Two

1. "Ranking Full Stop" – The Beat
2. "Man at C&A" – The Specials
3. "Missing Words" – The Selecter
4. "Inner London Violence" – Bad Manners
5. "Night Boat To Cairo" – Madness
6. "Too Much Pressure" – The Selecter
7. "Nite Klub" – The Specials
