= Celebrate the Bullet =

Studio album by the Selecter
- Released: 27 February 1981
- Recorded: October 1980
- Studio: Horizon Studios (Coventry)
- Genre: Ska; 2 tone; new wave
- Length: 42:29
- Label: Chrysalis
- Producer: Roger Lomas; the Selecter

The Selecter chronology
Too Much Pressure (1980)	Celebrate the Bullet (1981)	The Happy Album (1994)

Singles from Celebrate the Bullet
- 1. "Celebrate the Bullet" Released: 1981; 2. "Facing Situations" Released: 1981 (Spain-only release)

Celebrate the Bullet is the second studio album by the English 2 tone ska revival band the Selecter, released on 27 February 1981 by Chrysalis Records after the band had left the 2 Tone label. The album was recorded with producer Roger Lomas, who plays bass on some songs, and frequently seeks a more slow, eclectic sound, with new wave influences. Band members Charley Anderson and Desmond Brown, uncomfortable with the new approach, left the band during production and after the release of 1980 single "The Whisper" to form the band the People. They were replaced by keyboardist, James Mackie, and bass player, Adam Williams. Ian Dury and the Blockheads bassist Norman Watt-Roy played bass on the title-track and "Washed Up and Left for Dead".

The album's lyrical content is frequently bleak, taking inspiration from early 1980s racial and social conflicts, economic problems and war. Upon release, the album was a critical and commercial failure. The release of the title track as a single unintentionally coincided with the attempted assassination of Ronald Reagan, and "at such a time it would have been a brave radio producer who would have earmarked a track titled 'Celebrate the Bullet' for a prime time slot." As a result, the single and album flopped and the band subsequently broke-up. Nonetheless, the album has more recently been reappraised, and is considered by lead vocalist Pauline Black to be among the band's best work. Captain Oi! Records remastered the album in 2001.

== Background and recording ==
The Selecter's debut studio album Too Much Pressure (1980), with its blend of ska, reggae and punk and socio-conscious lyrics, was a critical and commercial success; however, the aftermath of its release was fraught with problems for the band. Their relationship with 2 Tone Records was diminishing, who were releasing merchandise without band consent, and also felt "there were not enough avenues for them to broaden their musical horizons again this was due to the huge success of 2 Tone." During these events, the group "admitted that they were less than happy" with Too Much Pressure (1980), which they felt was the product of what their singer Pauline Black recalled was "a life-span, which was telescoped down into a very short space of time". The band left the label and signed a direct deal with its parent label Chrysalis to record their second studio album, Celebrate the Bullet. They recorded a non-album single, "The Whisper", which was a Top 40 hit.

In August 1980, the band convened at Coventry's Horizon Studios, the same place they recorded their debut studio album, to begin "laying down possible new tracks" for the album, "guaranteed to bring on a fresh bout of arguments." Most of the band had taken influence from new wave and wanted to incorporate the sound into their new album. However, a minority of the band were put off, and the arguments in the band about the album material were tense, with Black recalling: "I think the main protagonists were [bassist Charley Anderson] and [keyboardist Desmond Brown]". On 21 August, Brown inexplicably left the band, saying that he was "done with the band." Anderson soon also asked to leave the band. He had refused to play on the album and later stating he "didn’t think it was the right direction for the band." Brown and Anderson soon formed short-lived 2 Tone band the People with Silverton Hutchinson, original drummer for the Specials.

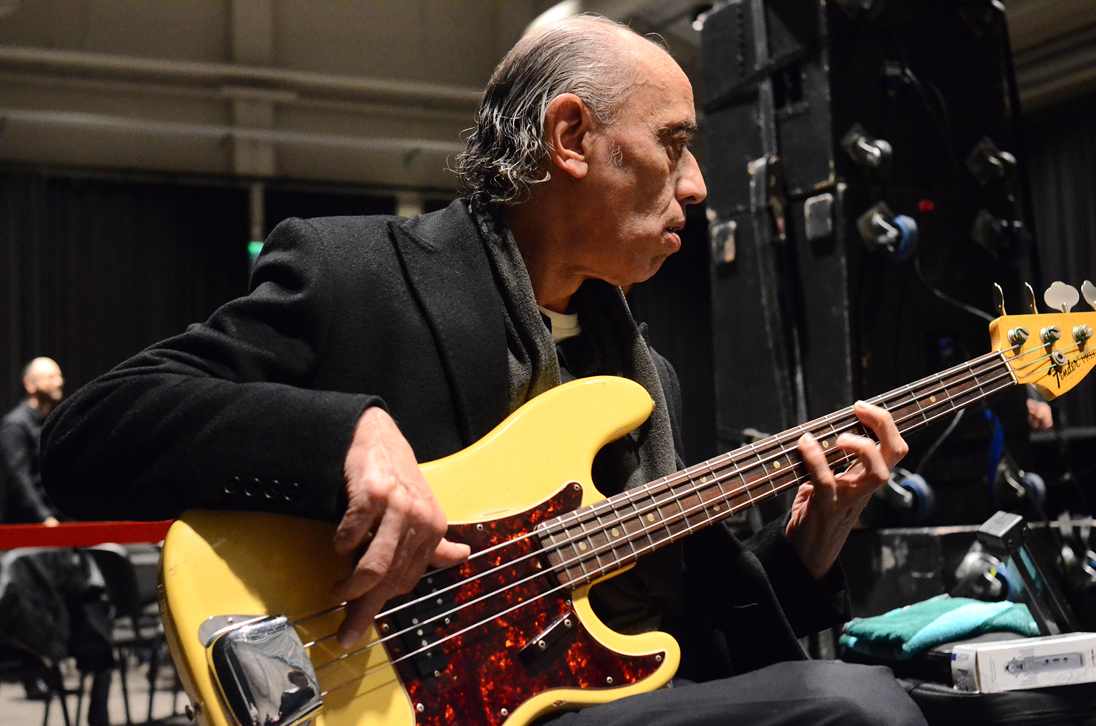
Norman Watt-Roy (pictured in 2014) played bass on two tracks during the band's personnel change.

Shortly after, when the Selecter played non-album single "The Whisper" on Top of the Pops on the same day that Ian Dury and the Blockheads performed "I Want to Be Straight", Dury observed the band were short of band members, and in a studio lift following the show's recording, proposed to the Selecter that his bassist Norman Watt-Roy play bass on a few of their tracks until the band found official replacements for Brown and Anderson. Black called Watt-Roy "the quintessential new wave bassist." Watt-Roy ultimately played bass on the title-track and "Washed Up and Left for Dead", two brooding songs written by band lyricist and founder Neol Davies which "both needed a definitive bass line, the kind of melodic line that was a 'hook' in itself." Black recalled "it was obvious that he understood the sparing subtlety required to match the evocative vocal lines and poignant guitar melodies."

Celebrate the Bullet was recorded with record producer Roger Lomas, who had produced the band's debut single "On My Radio"; Black had regretted the fact he did not produce Too Much Pressure (1980) as a result of the band's democratic decision against it, but the new line-up allowed him to return. Lomas played bass on the other songs that Watt-Roy did not perform on until Adam Williams joined the band as bassist and official replacement for Anderson, "and as luck would have it Williams knew a keyboard player, James Mackie who could also play saxophone, which was ideal for the musical direction which, The Selecter were about to take." Barry Jones, who had played trombone for the band beforehand, also guested on the recording.

== Music ==
Celebrate the Bullet is a dark and tense album, featuring a "less lively sound" than previous releases, and is strongly political, with lyrics focusing on social and racial relations, "cold war paranoia and fear for the future." In the words of Martin C. Strong, the album was a "more lugubrious state-of-the-nation musing" than Too Much Pressure (1980). In the Rough Guide to Rock, Peter Buckley said, "with a title like Celebrate the Bullet, we knew we were in for a serious sit-down talking-to. Sure, it was still pop music, it was still Britska (a term that, thankfully, was never widely used), it was still Pauline and the lads dancing around with lots of brass and a beat you could lean against, but it wasn't happy, not at all." One interviewer, whilst interviewing Black, described it as "a dark, haunting, bluesy iteration of ska that to my knowledge has never been attempted before or since." He said that "at times the songs have a new wave feel via synthesized keyboard melodies that buzz over Neol Davies' blistering, bluesy and soulful guitar solos and riffs. Other times its almost undefinable as the songs are driven by a seamless melting pot of rock, reggae and new wave via memorable melodies that stick in your head."

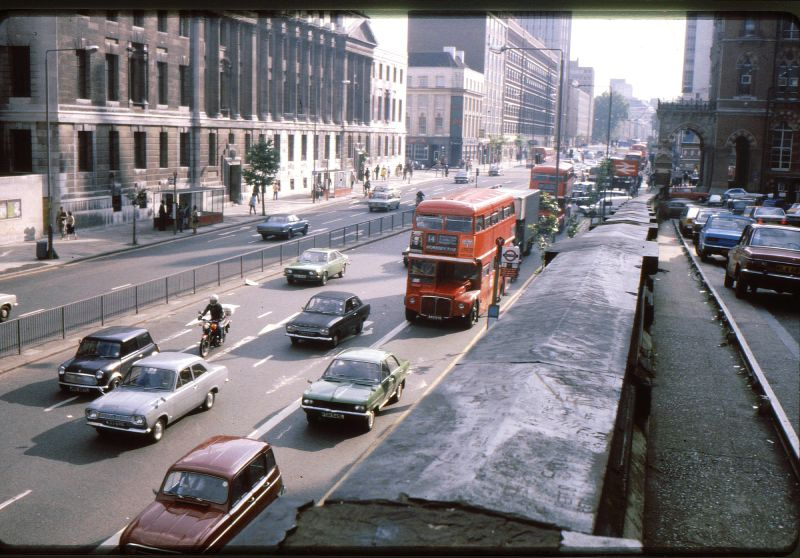
A British scene in 1980. The United Kingdom's early 1980s social and economic problems are an influence on the songwriting.

"Bristol and Miami" concerns the racial riots that had occurred in spring 1980 in Bristol (the 1980 St Pauls riot) and Miami (the 1980 Miami riots), and is said to slightly predate fellow 2 Tone band the Specials' "Ghost Town", a documentation of UK riots released later on in 1981. Freelance journalist Cazz Blase described the song in an article written for the website The F-Word, "The punky ska rhythms of ‘Bristol & Miami’ are typical of the Two Tone sound, and there's an energy to the track that hasn't faded over time. The song can't be read as encouraging rioting, but there is an eerie embattled exuberance to it, which compliments the tension in the lyrics. The strangely uplifting ending reflects this contradiction of styles and thoughts." "Red Reflections" is a "joyous" song. The title song has a "staunch anti-violence, anti war-theme."

"Deep Water" has been interpreted as "the inner monologue of a person here in the U.S. contemplating the loss of their home in the sub-prime mortgage crisis." Black, who sees the song as working "on many different levels", named it after a town that Black saw a highway sign for whilst riding on the band's tour bus during their first American tour. She explained, "The name just struck a chord with how I was feeling at the time. That tour was fraught with internal problems among us and I was deeply unhappy for most of the time, so I began to pen a song to reflect those inner feelings. I finished writing the song just around the time that keyboardist Desmond Brown finally walked out of the band for some unknown reason, just prior to the sacking of Charley Anderson. Believe me, it really did feel as though we were in ‘deepwater’ back then." "Selling Out Your Future", written by lead guitarist Compton Amanor, is a "sad, lifting, reggae paean to recessionary Britain."

== Packaging and visuals ==
For Celebrate the Bullet, the band "embarked on a new way of styling [themselves]." Davies' wife, Jane, designed the album cover and the new band logo, used on the LP's labels, which "looks like a red, white and black 'pie chart' and is affectionately known as the 'pie of cheese' in some circles." In her autobiography, Black regretted Jane's stylings, as she felt the band needed more potent, striking artwork when their career was in as much damage as it was at the time. She explained:

"She was a disaffected art student who gad wanted to go to St Martin's but unfortunately, for whatever reason, didn't get in. Neol once said in an interview that this was because she was from a working-class background and thus she was ruled out for entry. This may or may not be true, but suffice to say she had not had the training that allowed Jerry Dammers to create the idea for our Too Much Pressure artwork. She was perhaps not the best person to start styling a band or producing professional artwork at a time when the band's career was in serious jeopardy and could have benefitted from a designer with a real vision."

Jane's "absurd" band stylings accompanied a new look for band members, an image change which "wasn't going to help either;" Black forwent her "trademark trilby hat and Fred Perry's in favour of a frizzy Afro and jump suit." "It was decided that I should rid myself of my hat and let my hair show," Black recalled, "essentially, it was considered a good idea to feminise myself so that we could appeal to a wider cross-section of people. In retrospect this was a terrible mistake and I should have had the foresight and sense to resist, but at times I am the kind of person who says 'anything for a quiet life' and, to be honest, I was by now totally at sea." Other members of the band also changed their clothing and visual appearance; in Black's words, Davies "grew pointed sideburns as though he was Daryl Hall's clone" and Gaps "looked like a maracas-playing escapee from a soca band."

The original British LP cover "shows a TV with a red screen, over which the words ‘Celebrate the bullet’ have been printed," whilst the back cover features an image of the band on the television instead. The American edition, however, swaps the front and back cover images, and the album cover also sometimes varied in European countries, often featuring the band's logo superimposed over the image of the television. Original copies of the album featured a black belly band on the sleeve.

== Release and promotion ==
On 6 February 1981, Chrysalis released "Celebrate the Bullet" as the album's lead single. However, its release date was "unfortunate timing" due to the murder of John Lennon two months earlier. The United Kingdom's leading radio station at the time, BBC Radio 1, banned the track as their DJ Mike Read, taking the song name literally, believed the band "were trying to say something clever about [Lennon's murder], which of course couldn't have been further from the truth." As a result of the ban, the song was a commercial failure, failing to chart on the UK Singles Chart. Chrysalis hurried to release Celebrate the Bullet, releasing it on 27 February 1981, ahead of its original intended release date, "hoping that when the single was seen in context with the overall sentiments of the album, it would be looked at anew and interest would be stimulated again." However, the "salvage attempt" was "blown out of the water" with the attempted assassination of Ronald Reagan a month later.

No further singles, other than "Facing Situations" in Spain, were released from the album, and it only reached number 41 on the UK Albums Chart and staying on the chart for only four weeks, a huge decline from the top 5 peak achieved by Too Much Pressure (1980). HMV had reduced the price of the album to £3.99 as part of their winter sale in 1981, and specifically published an advertisement in the NME concerning the album's discount price, in hope of clearing unsold copies. The declining commercial fortunes for the band and crumbling relationships inside the band ultimately led to them breaking up shortly after its release.

On 18 June 2001, Captain Mod Records' sub-label Captain Oi! re-issued Celebrate the Bullet on CD, marking the album's first edition on the format, with the inclusion of four bonus tracks, including "The Whisper" and its B-side, a version of the Ethiopians "Train to Skaville", as well as liner notes by George Marshall and pictures of rare overseas singles' sleeves.

In 2022, the album was reissued on 180g clear vinyl LP, as well as a 3 CD deluxe box set featuring unreleased material, BBC sessions, and a live performance from December 1980.

== Critical reception and legacy ==
Professional ratings
Review scores
Source	Rating
AllMusic	2/5 stars
Robert Christgau	B−
The Encyclopedia of Popular Music	3/5 stars

Upon release, Celebrate the Bullet was received indifferently by music critics. In The Village Voice, Robert Christgau rated the album "B−" and said "with Pauline Black fallen under the influence of Lene Lovich and the groove wavering along with her, it's up to the songwriting. Which features more dreams, water, reflections, stormy weather, and "jagged imagery" than is healthy for bomb scare victims or ska bands." Several retrospective reviews are similarly muted in their praise; Chris Woodstra of AllMusic wrote that it "failed to live up to the promise of the band's debut," and although commenting that "it has its moments," "those can all be found on the collection, Selected Selecter Selections." Trouser Press said the record contained "little of the first LP's brilliance; although the performances don't lack anything tangible, the songwriting is vastly less inspired and none of the anti-trendy cleverness so vital to the previous album's uniqueness can be discerned."

Nonetheless, the album has in more recent times has seen more praise than distaste. In an interview with Pauline Black, one journalist said it was "his favourite album of the entire 2-Tone era." On 19 August 2012, The F Word chose "Bristol & Miami" as their "Song of the Day". Slicing Up Eyeballs included the album on their ballot for the best albums of 1981. George Marshall also wrote favourably of the album. Other artists have also taken to the album; electronic music duo Orbital included "Celebrate the Bullet" on their Back to Mine (2002) compilation of 'after hours' songs that have influenced them throughout the years. One member of the duo said he bought the song when it was released and noted it "still sends shivers down my spine." Sean Diamond of Louder Than War was favourable towards the record in 2013, describing it as "a tense recording dripping with cold war paranoia and fear for the future which still sounds alarmingly prescient today."

Black considers Celebrate the Bullet to be one of the band's best albums, and to be superior to its predecessor. Speaking to Exclusive Magazine in 2016, she said: "Celebrate the Bullet was in my opinion, musically a much better album than Too Much Pressure, but unfortunately the release coincided with the gun murder of John Lennon and the attempted assassination of President Ronald Reagan. UK Radio did not want to play the title single and without radio-play, no record gets a particularly fair hearing. Given the fullness of time, I think that many present day Selecter fans see that piece of work as a much fuller representation of The Selecter than Too Much Pressure. "Celebrate the Bullet" remains a highlight for me in the Selecter canon. I can’t think of a better song that has been written about the futility of gun violence than that." In her book Black by Design: A 2-Tone Memoir, Black said

"I think Celebrate the Bullet is a forgotten classic of 2-Tone, on par with 'Ghost Town' in terms of orchestration and arrangement, but with a more oblique message. It was an own goal for Neol Davies. Without a hit single, both the British tour and sales of the album were in jeopardy. Neol had told us to prepare for success. Now we silently stared into the abyss while arguably making the best album of our careers. I stand by Celebrate the Bullet wholeheartedly. It is a proud album by a proud band. We were rowing against the tide and ultimately were swamped in the mighty swell of the '80s pop market. There was no place for us in the musical world anymore."

== Track listing ==
All tracks composed by Neol Davies except where noted.

Side one

1. "(Who Likes) Facing Situations" – 3.32
2. "Deepwater" (Pauline Black) – 4.09
3. "Red Reflections" (Pauline Black) – 3.38
4. "Tell Me What's Wrong" (Arthur "Gaps" Hendrickson) – 3.30
5. "Bombscare" (Compton Amanor) – 3.05
6. "Washed Up and Left for Dead" – 3.57

Side two

7. "Celebrate the Bullet" – 4.34
8. "Selling Out Your Future" (Compton Amanor) – 3.59
9. "Cool Blue Lady" – 3.30
10. "Their Dream Goes On" – 3.42
11. "Bristol and Miami" (Pauline Black) – 4.58

Bonus tracks on 2001 CD release

12. "The Whisper" – 3.01
13. "Train to Skaville" (Leonard Dillon)
14. "Last Tango in Dub" (Selecter) – dub version of "Washed Up and Left for Dead"
15. "Train to Skaville" (12" Version) (Dillon)

Bonus tracks on 2022 3-CD deluxe reissue

Disc 2

1. Celebrate the Bullet (Single Version) (2022 remaster)
2. Last Tango in Dub (2022 remaster) (Selecter)
3. Deepwater (Unreleased Single Version) (Black)
4. Deepwater (Unreleased Dub Version) (Black)
5. Selling Out Your Future (BBC Session John Peel 11/10/1980) (Amanor)
6. Tell Me What's Wrong (BBC Session John Peel 11/10/1980) (Hendrickson)
7. Washed Up and Left for Dead BBC Session John Peel 11/10/1980)
8. Selling Out Your Future (BBC Session John Peel 11/10/1980) (Amanor)
9. Deepwater (BBC Session John Peel 11/10/1980) (Black)
10. Bombscare (BBC Session) (Amanor)
11. (Who Likes) Facing Situations (BBC Session Mike Read 14/11/1980)
12. Cool Blue Lady (BBC Session Mike Read 14/11/1980)
13. Selling Out Your Future (BBC Session Mike Read 14/11/1980) (Amanor)

Disc 3

1. Out on the Streets (Live at the NEC, Birmingham, 27/12/1980)
2. Danger (Live at the NEC, Birmingham, 27/12/1980) (Selecter)
3. Deepwater (Live at the NEC, Birmingham, 27/12/1980) (Black)
4. Missing Words (Live at the NEC, Birmingham, 27/12/1980)
5. Washed Up & Left for Dead (Live at the NEC, Birmingham, 27/12/1980)
6. On My Radio (Live at the NEC, Birmingham, 27/12/1980)
7. Celebrate the Bullet (Live at the NEC, Birmingham, 27/12/1980)
8. Selling Out Your Future (Live at the NEC, Birmingham, 27/12/1980) (Amanor)
9. Street Feeling (Live at the NEC, Birmingham, 27/12/1980)
10. They Make Me Mad (Live at the NEC, Birmingham, 27/12/1980) (Black & Desmond Brown)
11. Bristol & Miami (Live at the NEC, Birmingham, 27/12/1980) (Black)
12. (Who Likes) Facing Situations (Live at the NEC, Birmingham, 27/12/1980)
13. Bombscare (Live at the NEC, Birmingham, 27/12/1980) (Amanor)
14. Too Much Pressure (Live at the NEC, Birmingham, 27/12/1980)

== Personnel ==
The Selecter

- Pauline Black – vocals
- Arthur 'Gaps' Hendrickson – vocals
- Neol Davies – guitar; twelve-string guitar
- Compton Amanor – guitar
- Adam Williams – bass guitar
- James Mackie – keyboards; Hammond organ; saxophone
- Charlie "H" Bembridge – drums; percussion

with:

- Norman Watt-Roy – bass on "Celebrate the Bullet" and "Washed Up and Left For Dead"
- Roger Lomas – bass on "Deepwater"
- Barry Jones – trombone on "Celebrate the Bullet"

Production and artwork

- Kim Templeman-Holmes – recording
- Jane Davies – design concept; sleeve
- John "Teflon" Sims – art direction

== Charts ==
Chart performance for Celebrate the Bullet
Chart (2022)	Peak position
Scottish Albums (OCC)	30
