= The Happy Album =

Studio album by The Selecter
- Released: July 1994
- Genre: Ska
- Length: 37:51
- Labels: Demon; Triple X; Quattro
- Producers: Jimmy "Seyna" Haynes; Nick Welsh

The Selecter chronology
Celebrate the Bullet (1981)	The Happy Album (1994)	Pucker! (1995)

The Happy Album is the third studio album by British ska band The Selecter, and their first following their reformation in 1990, released in 1994 on Demon Music in the UK and Triple X in the US. Their first album of new material in thirteen years, The Happy Album follows their successful live reunion tour of 1991 and its respective live album document, Out in the Streets (1992). Founding member Neol Davies left the band after Out in the Streets while fellow original member Arthur "Gaps" Hendrickson rejoined the band. The new line-up recorded The Happy Album with production from Aswad guitarist Jimmy "Seyna" Haynes

While retaining the band's ska sound at its core, the album sees a new direction for the band, taking influence from and incorporating other genres, styles and techniques, including electronic music, hip hop, sampling and orchestral music, and also features several slower reggae tracks, including two cover versions. Despite the album's name, the record's lyrics are bleak and concerned with social injustice. Although expected to alienate some long-time fans, upon release, the album was greeted with critical acclaim. The band toured in promotion of the album in 1994 and a special edition was released by Moon Ska Europe in 2004.

== Background and recording ==
The Selecter's second album Celebrate the Bullet (1981) was a commercial failure, and the band split up shortly after its release. Lead singer Pauline Black moved into acting and writing work as well as undergoing a short solo career under Chrysalis Records, who released her unsuccessful cover version of "I Can See Clearly Now", originally by Jimmy Cliff. Similarly unsuccessful was the pirate radio-themed "Pirates of the Airwave", her single under the extended name Pauline Black and The Sunday Best (a backing band consisting of fellow ska musicians Neville Staple and Lynval Golding). Her acting career won her the 1990 "Time Out Award for Best Actress" in regards to her portrayal of singer Billie Holiday.

However, with the enduring legacy of 2 Tone music and how, in the words of critic Terry Rompers, "latter-day bluebeat refuses to die," The Selecter reunited in 1991 with a new-line up which reunited Black with band founder Neol Davies; the line-up, which also consisted of drummer Perry Melius and former Bad Manners members Nick Welsh and Martin Stewart, performed a series of live performances, leading to the critically acclaimed live album Out on the Streets (1992), recorded in London and released on Receiver Records, and the success of the band's return meant that their return was not temporary. The band's reunion came about after Buster Bloodvessel, front man of fellow ska band Bad Manners, spoke to the band over the phone about the possibility. Black said that Fine Young Cannibals' album The Raw & the Cooked (1989) had restored her faith in music and inspired her to start singing again.

The band aimed to record their third studio album, The Happy Album, a year later. However, Davies left the band to pursue a solo career, and was replaced by fellow original member Arthur "Gaps" Hendrickson on vocals. The band got ready to record the album in 1993 in a studio on London's Holloway Road. Black and Hendrickson share vocals on The Happy Album. The line-up that recorded the album was completed by bassist Nick Welsh and keyboardist Martin Stewart, both of whom played on the live album. Aswad lead guitarist and producer Jimmy "Senya" Haynes was the album's main producer, while also contributing guitar. Welsh, besides playing bass, has also been credited with contributing co-writing and co-production to the album, while mixing the album with Zah Martin.

== Music and lyrics ==
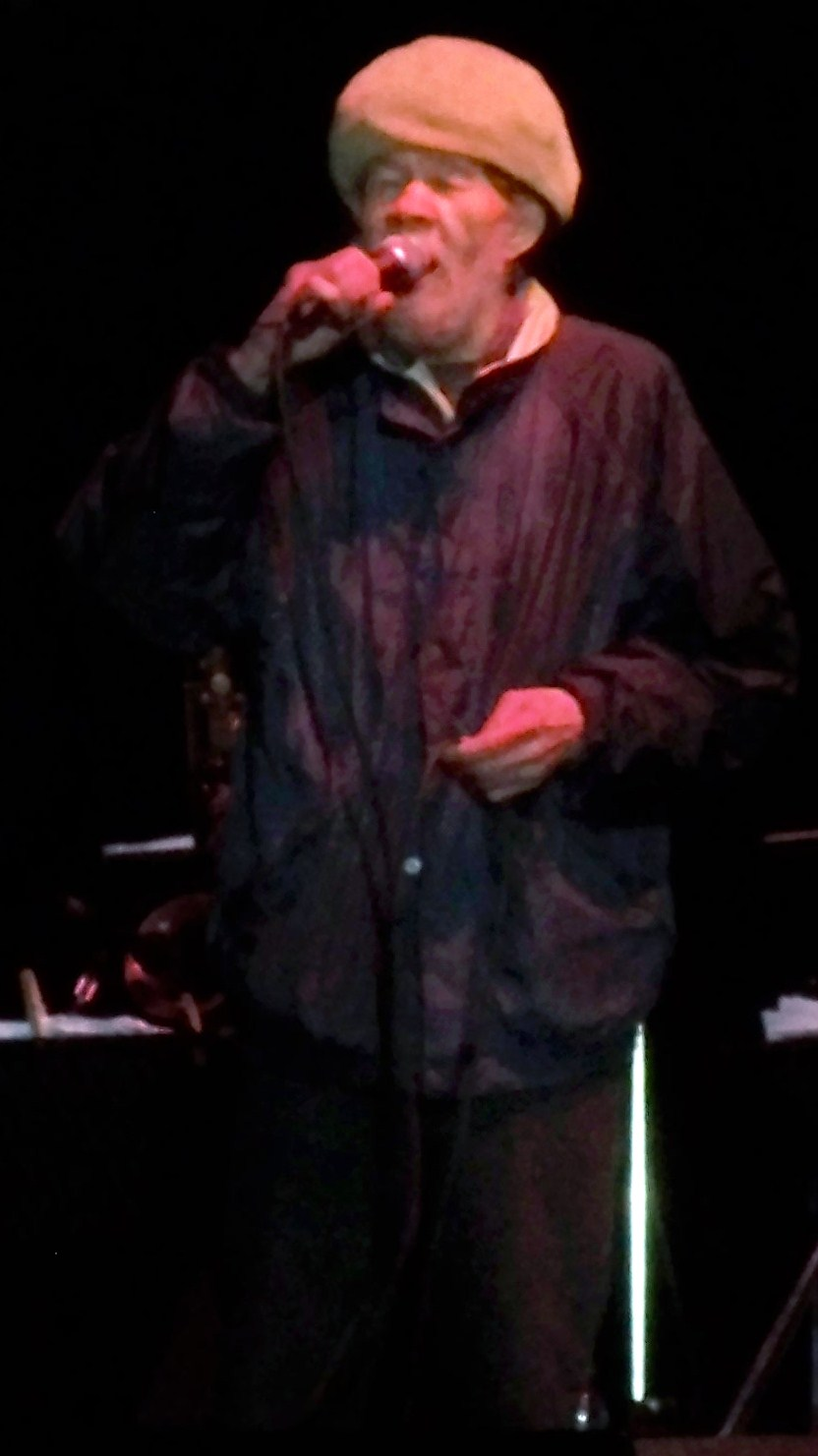
Rico Rodriguez plays trombone on "Sweet and Dandy."

The Happy Album sees a stylistic change for the band's music; while the album is still predominately a ska album, keeping the genre as "its boppy touchstone," the album also takes other influences from numerous other genres. According to Terry Rompers of Trouser Press, the album occasionally slows down "to a reggae strut," while "using samples, electronics, contemporary rhythms and broader songwriting to roughly parallel for the memory of 2- Tone what Big Audio Dynamite did for punk." As with the band's debut album Too Much Pressure (1980), there are also several reggae cover versions on the album, namely "I Want Justice", originally by Delroy Wilson, and "Sweet and Dandy" by Toots Hibbert. Lyrically, the album is "burdened by a social conscience", bring a sombre irony to the album name.

Heralding in the new direction, opening song "Reselecterization" features an instrumental flourish that is "explicitly derived" from hip hop music, but after that, the album "soon settles down into a ska groove that," according to Rick Anderson of AllMusic, "is far from the old school on its shiny surfaces but still deeply rooted in Jamaican verities." "California Screaming" is about, "among other things," the police assault of Rodney King, while "Copasetic", an anti-war song, and "Mother Knows Best", are said to veil their subjects in "obscure detail." The latter song features church bells, whistles and synthesised orchestral strings. "I Want Justice" similarly features whistles and bells. The cover version of "Sweet and Dandy", one such "juxtaposition of old and new" on the record, counterbalances its slick, contemporary production with "greasy" trombone playing from Jamaican trombonist Rico Rodriguez, who had worked with the band on their debut album, as well as Black's "husky vocals." Some songs feature "studio frippery."

== Release and reception ==
Professional ratings
Review scores
Source	Rating
AllMusic	3/5 stars
The Encyclopedia of Popular Music	3/5 stars
Martin C. Strong	5/10
Trouser Press	(favourable)

In the United Kingdom, The Happy Album was released in July 1994 by the Demon Music Group, and was their first release on the label. In the United States, it was released on Triple X Records with slightly different artwork and a sticker on the CD case, while in Japan it was released by Quattro with another album cover. One critic speculated that, due to its new direction, the album would alienate several long-time fans while possibly finding the band several new fans too. No singles were released to promote the album, and it did not chart on the UK Albums Chart. Record label Moon Ska Europe remastered and re-released the album in the UK in 2004, with the music video for the band's early song "Missing Words" added as a bonus CD-ROM element.

Unlike the band's second album Celebrate the Bullet, The Happy Album was greeted with critical acclaim. Rick Anderson of AllMusic rated the album three stars out of five, saying he recommended the album and noting that "Sweet Dandy" was the album's "best juxtaposition of old and new" and noting how "Mother Knows Best" and "I Want Justice" both manage "to draw strength from the added bells and whistles." Terry Rompers of Trouser Press was also favourable, saying: "The Happy Album is anything but, and that's to its credit." In The Encyclopedia of Popular Music, writer Colin Larkin rated the album three stars out of five. More mixed in his assessment was Martin C. Strong in The Great Rock Bible, rating it 5/10 and saying: "The Selecter threw in a bit of hip hop and orchestral flourishes into the mix [...] the reggae roots kept the group on rock-steady ground."

The Selecter toured in promotion of The Happy Album, and in late 1994 they reached Limelight in Belfast, Northern Ireland and The Town Pump in Vancouver, Canada. The band toured America with The Skatalites, with whom they shared a tour bus. The two bands rarely spoke on the bus and Black spent her time listening to Björk. For the first time in the band's history, the same line-up that recorded one album recorded another one, as the same line-up as that on The Happy Album followed the record up with Pucker! (1995), which again saw a slight artistic deviation; in the words of Rompers, "the same mob [that made The Happy Album] made Hairspray [Pucker!'s American equivalent], but you'd never know it from the catchy chorus of 'My Perfect World,' which leads it off, or the cornball pot-centric version of Bob Dylan's 'Rainy Day Women #12 & 35' that curls up near the end."

== Track listing ==
All songs written by The Selecter; except where noted.

1. "Reselecterization" – 4:20
2. "Whip Them Down" – 3:04
3. "Sweet and Dandy" (Toots Hibbert) – 3:54
4. "Neurotica" – 3:37
5. "California" – 5:17
6. "Screaming" – 2:32
7. "I Want Justice" (Delroy Wilson) – 4:00
8. "Trout" – 3:26
9. "Mother Knows Best" – 3:34
10. "Ladders" – 4:02

== Personnel ==
The Selecter

- Pauline Black – vocals
- Arthur "Gaps" Hendrickson – vocals
- Nick Welsh – bass, production, mixing
- Martin Stewart – keyboards

with:

- Jimmy "Senya" Haynes – production, guitar
- Rico Rodriguez – trombone
- Zah Martin – mixing
