= Too Much Pressure =

Studio album by the Selecter
- Released: 15 February 1980
- Recorded: December 1979 – January 1980
- Studio: Horizon Studios (Coventry)
- Genres: 2 tone; ska
- Length: 40:43
- Labels: 2 Tone; Chrysalis
- Producers: Errol Ross; the Selecter

The Selecter chronology
Too Much Pressure (1980)	Celebrate the Bullet (1981)

Singles from Too Much Pressure
- 1. "Three Minute Hero" Released: 1980; 2. "Missing Words" Released: 1980

Too Much Pressure is the debut studio album by the English 2 tone ska revival band the Selecter. After the band's official formation in 1979 in Coventry, following the release of a song entitled "The Selecter" by an unofficial incarnation of the band, the band's hit single "On My Radio" prompted their labels 2 Tone and Chrysalis to ask the band to record their debut album. Working with producer Errol Ross, the Selecter recorded the album at Horizon Studios over two months. The album contains original material, mostly composed by band founder and guitarist Neol Davies, as well as numerous ska and reggae cover versions, in a similar fashion to the Specials' debut album.

The album was released in February 1980 on 2 Tone records. The record was commercially successful, charting at number 5 in the United Kingdom. The record's singles, "Three Minute Hero" and "Missing Words", made the top 25 of the UK Singles Chart. The album was also critically successful, and has had lasting praise in the ensuing years. Although the band's accompanying 2 On 2 Tour with several other 2 Tone acts was fraught with violence, it also helped achieve, in part, the album's commercial success. The band performed the album live for the first time as part of its 35th anniversary tour in 2014.

== Background ==
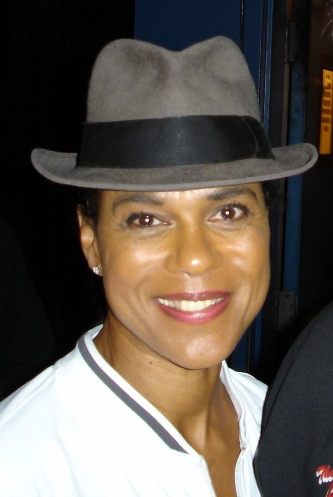
Pauline Black (pictured in 2005).

In 1977, Coventry-based musicians Neol Davies (guitar), Barry Jones (trombone) and John Bradbury (drums) recorded a rocksteady instrumental together named "The Kingston Affair". In 1979, when 2 tone initiators the Specials, for which Bradbury had become drummer, had spent their entire recording budget (allegedly £700) for their debut single "Gangsters", the band were still requiring a B-side for the song, Bradbury suggested "The Kingston Affair", which at that point had remained unreleased; it became the song's B-side with the new name "The Selecter", and was credited to the band name the Selecter too.

"Gangsters" had become a national hit by July 1979, and had prompted interest in the Selecter, so Davies chose to create an actual band with the name, with a sound similar to the Specials. One biography stated that, "at the time Coventry had various reggae, punk and soul bands on the go, which proved to be rich pickings for anyone wishing to create the 2 Tone sound." Davies recruited his friends keyboardist Desmond Brown and bassist Charley Anderson, and "filled out the lineup with guitarist Compton Amanor, Charley 'H' Bembridge on drums, and vocalist Arthur 'Gaps' Hendrickson; when Davies met Pauline Black, he promptly gave her an audition, and she was added to the lineup as lead singer." According to one biography,

"Pauline had made her way to Coventry via Lanchester Polytechnic where she was 'asked to leave' although she did gain employment as a radiographer in a local hospital. Pauline had performed with various local bands and adopted the stage name Pauline Black to avoid any awkward questions from her employers. She would also earn the title of the first 2 Tone pin up which she took in her stride but she was always keen to point out that the music should come first."

After only a few weeks, the band had played live, both in Coventry and supporting the Specials in London, and signed to 2 Tone Records. Recording their first single, "On My Radio", on a £1,000 budget in Coventry's Horizon Studios with production from Roger Lomas, was the Selecter's first move. Backed with the B-side "Too Much Pressure", the single was an unprecedented success, reaching number 8 on the UK Singles Chart in October 1979, and ultimately selling almost 250,000 copies; ironically, although the song criticises radio's neglect of new music, it was a major radio success too. That same month, the band toured with Madness and the Specials as part of the first, sell-out "2 Tone Tour;" and all three bands appeared on Top of the Pops on 8 November 1979 playing their latest hits, "leaving no one in any doubt that 2 Tone had well and truly arrived." The band and 2 tone were now regulars in the music press, and keen to lean in on the 2 tone phenomenon, Chrysalis Records, the owner of 2 Tone Records, "rushed the band" into recording their debut album.

== Recording and music ==
"Taking a folkie risk like their confreres the Specials, they honor their undercapitalized roots by emulating the two-track sound of the cult hits they love. Fortunately, Davies has an amazing ability to recapture the ska spirit without pretending it's 1965."

— Robert Christgau

Too Much Pressure was recorded over two months from December 1979 to January 1980 in Horizon Studios, Coventry, the same place the band's debut single was recorded, with producer Errol Ross. Guest musicians Rico Rodriguez and Dick Cuthell of the Specials were drafted in to contribute the "necessary brass sections" to the album. Kim Templeman-Holmes engineered the sessions.

Too Much Pressure is largely a studio recording of the Selecter's live set list at the time, and while largely consisting of original material (mostly written by Davies), it also contains cover versions of numerous old ska and reggae tracks. This template is similar to the Specials' debut studio album The Specials, which was based on that band's live set and featured ska and reggae covers among its many original songs. The 2-tone.info article on the band, comparing the cover versions on Too Much Pressure to those on The Specials, felt that "The Selecter were somewhat less obvious in their choice of covers and opted for the likes of Justin Hinds' 'Carry Go Bring Come' and The Pioneers' 'Time Hard'." Two cover versions from the band's live sets which were not recorded for the record, "Train to Skaville" by the Ethiopians and "Soulful I" by the Upsetters, were later recorded by the band following their departure from 2 Tone Records. The band also played a cover version of Prince Buster's "Madness", but this also did not make the album.

Overall, the album is tense and trebly, and displays a mix of punk rock, ska and reggae with raw vocals and politically conscious lyrics. The album's ska beats and "distinctive bouncy organ" contribute to the album's musical impact. According to Trouser Press, although Davies composed the majority of the album, the record's "contributions from other sources — within and without the lineup — add further variety." The magazine stated that the playing "hops along," especially with the sporadic horn section, and wrote that it is Black, "shining with enormous vocal talent," who "continually provides the spark." Black later recalled that she was happy with the two songs she contributed, "Black and Blue" and "They Make Me Mad." The album's title song directly references "what was going on socially at that time," while "They Make Me Mad" attacks "the divisive rhetoric of the privileged."

== Release and promotion ==
Too Much Pressure was released on 15 February 1980 by 2 Tone Records and Chrysalis Records. With the help of the 2 One 2 Tour, and the album's singles, Too Much Pressure ultimately reached number 5 in the UK Albums Chart, the band's highest peak on the chart to date, and stayed on the chart for thirteen weeks. The album was later certified Gold by the British Phonographic Industry (BPI) for sales of over 100,000. In the United States, where the album was released by Chrysalis alone, "On My Radio" was added as the first track. The album cover design is credited to "Teflon" Sims and David Storey, with photography by Rick Mann, and depicts Steve Eaton.

"Three Minute Hero" was released as the first single from the album prior to the album's release so it could act "as a teaser of what to come." However, at the time, it was treated indifferently by music critics, and peaking at number 16 on the UK Singles Chart, it matched Madness' "The Prince" as the lowest chart position at that point reached by a 2 Tone single. The record was then surpassed by the album's second single, "Missing Words", remixed for the single release by Roger Lomas with a live rendition of "Carry Go Bring Home" on the B-side, only reached number 23 on the charts; however, both singles were still seen as successes. According to one author, "the chart position was no reflection on the work of Roger Lomas, who prior to 2 Tone had no experience with ska but had since went [sic] on to work with Bad Manners and the Bodysnatchers, but was perhaps a sign of things to come for the band and 2 Tone."

=== Touring ===
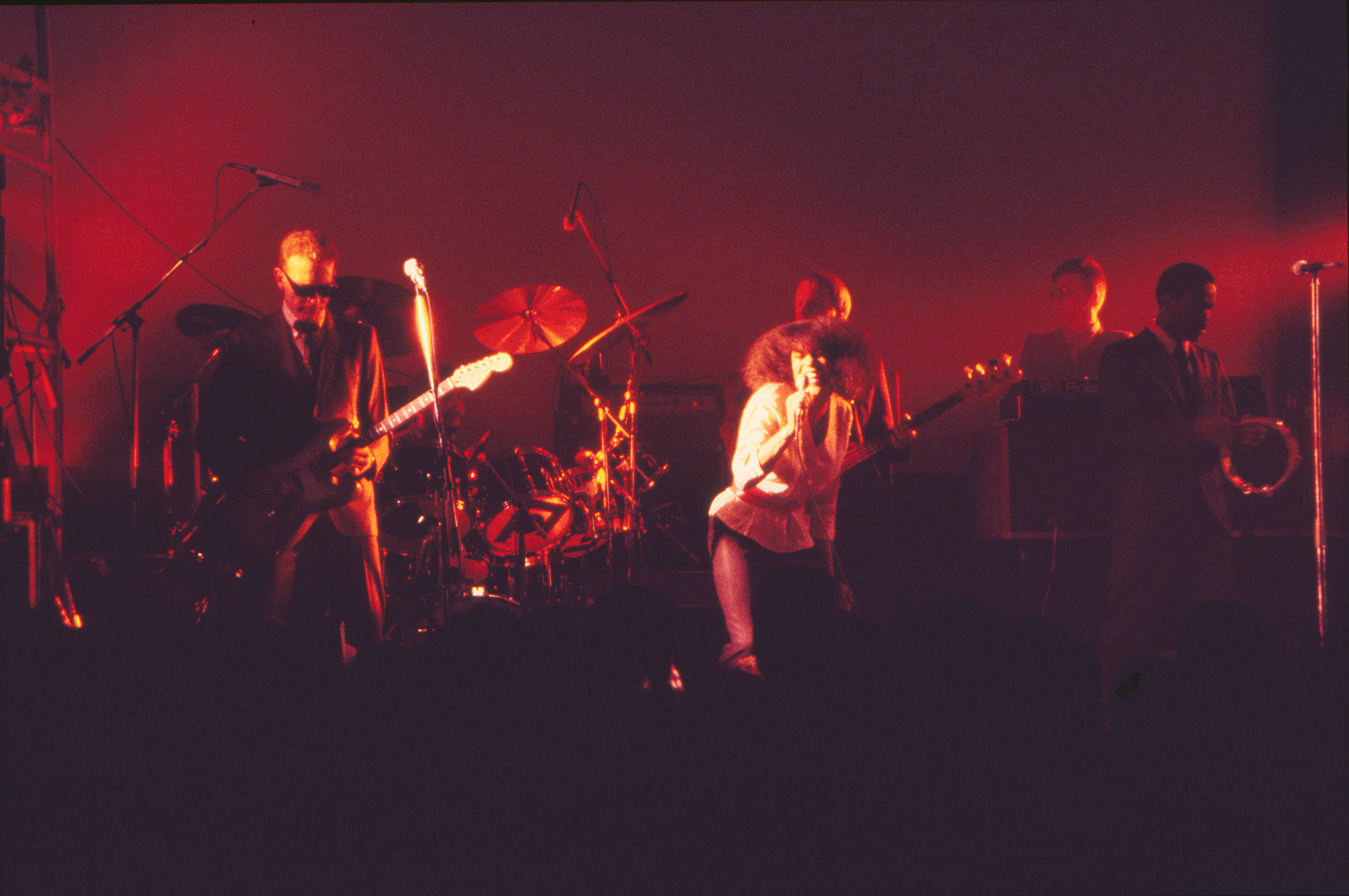
The Selecter playing live in Berlin, 1980.

To promote the record, 2 Tone Records organized the "2 One 2 Tour" tour for the Selecter, the Beat and the Bodysnatchers, the latter band of which was the latest signing by the label. However, the Beat opted out, as they could not focus on the tour having just started Go-Feet Records. American band Holly and the Italians replaced the Beat, but they were poorly received by audiences and were replaced by future 2 Tone signees the Swinging Cats after some time.

During the tour, the band witnessed the racism and violence that had started to become more prominent in audiences for 2 Tone performances; 2-tone.info states that "there was matter of racists attending the gigs. Like all bands on 2 Tone, The Selecter had their share of 'fans' who had rightwing sympathies and would make their presence known at gigs. Why racists would listen to ska or reggae is a mystery in itself and is all the more bizarre that they should attend a Selecter gig where, of the 7 members of the band, only Neol Davis was white." Although the crowd was often indifferent to Holly and the Italians, several audience members took great exception to the group, whose pop punk sound differed greatly from 2 Tone, and would incite violence.

As was also the case for the Specials, Chrysalis, 2-Tone's parent company, were hoping to give the band some success in the United States, organising a coast-to-coast tour, preceding with a re-release of "On My Radio". However, audiences were mostly unaware of the band; and Black later stated "There were small groups of people on the west and east coast who knew who we were but there was this huge big bit in the middle [of the US] who were completely gob-smacked by us". The tour "did little to expand the bands [sic] popularity in the US and they were to suffer the same fait [sic] as The Specials, with their material confined to the college radio circuit."

== Critical reception ==
Professional ratings
Review scores
Source	Rating
AllMusic	link
Colin Larkin	4/5 stars
Martin C. Strong	8/10
Record Mirror	2.5/5 stars
Robert Christgau	A−
Smash Hits	7/10
Sounds	5/5 stars
Trouser Press	(favourable)

Critical reception to Too Much Pressure was positive. Robert Christgau of The Village Voice awarded the album a score of "A−". He commented how, "except for songwriter-guitarist Neol Davies, these two-toners are black, reassuring in a movement that calls up fears of folkie patronization. Lead singer's a woman, too, a refreshing piece of progress no matter how self-consciously progressive its motives." He advised listeners to "play loud." Red Starr of Smash Hits rated the album seven out of ten. He felt that, while most of the strongest tracks are cover versions, the album relies on its ska beat, bouncy organ and Black's vocals to provide the impact, and called the album a "very healthy debut with plenty of life." Garry Bushell of Sounds rated the album five stars out of five, noting the vitality of the album and complimenting the catchiness of "Three Minute Hero."

In a retrospective review, AllMusic highlighted the album as an "Album Pick" and rated it four stars out of five. Trouser Press singled out Black as "continually [providing] the spark" and stated the album is "bursting with great songs." Louder Than War referred to the album as an "iconic" and "seminal debut album." In the Spin Alternative Record Guide, it is commented that, although the album contained "requisite cover tunes," the album was "much more celebrated for unorthodox originals like 'Three Minute Hero' and 'My Collie (Not a Dog)'." In The Great Rock Discography, Martin C. Strong called the album an "effervescent companion piece to The Specials' more radical debut" and singling out the cover versions as the best tracks. Helen G of The F-Word praised the album for "having everything," complimenting the "heady brew of punk, ska and reggae music, politically conscious lyrics and the raw, passionate vocals."

The album has featured in several critics' lists; Robert Christgau, in his "Dean's List" of the year's best albums, a list curated for the annual Pazz & Jop poll, named the album the 60th best of 1980. Music journalist Simon Reynolds lists it as one of the five most important albums of "2-Tone and the Ska Resurrection" in his 2005 book Rip It Up and Start Again: Postpunk 1978–1984.

== Legacy and aftermath ==
Following the release of the album, Black became dubbed the "Queen of British Ska." Helen G of The F-Word considers Black's contributions to the album to be the first notable example of a woman "working in the reggae idiom" during the punk scene. The Selecter were the only band aside from the Specials to record a full album for 2 Tone Records, as many of its artists only released one single on the label; Black, speaking to Spin magazine in 2009, recalled: "We didn't just do one single, we did an album, we did tours. Is that a point of pride? Yeah, absolutely. We believed in it. And I think we fully embodied the whole ethos of 2 Tone much more maybe than some of the other bands. For a start, there were six black people, one white person, and a female in the band." A poster for the album was known to hang in Chrysalis' head offices for a long time following its release. The Selecter explored similar themes to Too Much Pressure on their twelfth studio album Made in Britain (2012), which contains a re-recording of "They Make Me Mad", whose lyrics were said by Helen G to "remain relevant" in 2012. "Too Much Pressure" featured in the film The Abyss (1989).

Despite the critical and commercial success of Too Much Pressure, the aftermath of its release was fraught with problems for the band. Their relationship with 2 Tone Records was disintegrating, who were publishing merchandise without the band's consent (Davies once commented: "There is a hell of a lot of money being made, supposedly in our names, but where's it all going?"), and also felt "there were not enough avenues for them to broaden their musical horizons again this was due to the huge success of 2 Tone." The band left the label and signed a direct deal with its parent label Chrysalis to record their more eclectic second studio album Celebrate the Bullet (1981), but not before Brown and Anderson left the band, with replacements in the band personnel therefore being made.

The Selecter were also unsatisfied with the production of Too Much Pressure, considering the album to be the product of what Black recalled was "a life-span [...] telescoped down into a very short space of time". In her autobiography Black by Design, Black said Ross "somehow wrecked" the album, and said it would have "sounded better" had it been produced by Lomas instead: "I thought that it was very unfortunate that the man who had produced 'On My Radio' as our first single didn’t get the chance to produce the first album. But that was due to political fighting in the band, and a question who had control of it and who didn’t. But that’s all water under the bridge." However, Black remains happy with the album's themes, reflecting in 2016 that the Selecter's intents never changed in the ensuing years "because no tectonic plates have really moved as far as we’re concerned. Maybe they’ve moved in other areas. But as far as that whole black-white thing going on in society, those tectonic plates have moved but there hasn’t been any real seismic kind of alleviation of the pressure. It’s too much pressure then, and it’s still too much pressure now.”

=== Re-releases and anniversary tour ===
"We thought our 35th anniversary would be the perfect time to revisit our very first album Too Much Pressure and perform it in full…for the very first time! We can’t wait to get on the road to bring our message of multiculturalism from across 4 decades to venues up and down the land."

— Pauline Black, speaking prior to the 35th anniversary tour.

Too Much Pressure has been re-released several times; in 1988, Chrysalis re-released the LP in Germany, and Captain Mod has remastered and re-released the album on CD twice, on 18 June 2001 and 19 May 2014, both times with three bonus tracks: "The Selecter", "On My Radio" and the single version of "Too Much Pressure." Re-issue label Obscure Alternatives have also re-released the album on LP in the United States in both 2012 and 2016; the 2012 edition was pressed variantly on black and grey vinyl, whilst the 2016 edition, which was limited to 589 copies, features a white vinyl with black effects and markings.

From February–April 2014, the band celebrated the album's 35th anniversary with the national "Too Much Pressure 35th Anniversary Tour," where, for the first time, they played the album in its entirety. In addition to performing the full record, the group also played "an extended encore of hits and live favourites from across The Selecter’s extensive 35-year spanning back catalogue," including "On My Radio" and material from their latest, critically successful album String Theory (2013). The tour was well-received by such publications as GQ and Rock City.

== Track listing ==
All tracks composed by Neol Davies except where noted.

=== Side one ===
1. "Three Minute Hero" – 3:00
2. "Everyday" (aka "Time Hard") (Sydney Crooks, Jackie Robinson, George Agard) – 3:10
3. "They Make Me Mad" (Pauline Black, Lawton Brown) – 2:47
4. "Missing Words" – 3:22
5. "Danger" (Selecter) – 2:38
6. "Street Feeling" – 3:11
7. "My Collie (Not a Dog)" (Robert Spencer, Johnny Roberts) – 2:45

=== Side two ===
1. "Too Much Pressure" – 3:48
2. "Murder" (Leon & Owen) – 2:39
3. "Out on the Streets" – 4:28 – mistakenly listed as 3:28 on the vast majority of releases
4. "Carry Go Bring Come" (Justin Hinds) – 3:02
5. "Black and Blue" (Pauline Black) – 3:17
6. "James Bond" (Monty Norman) – 2:16

Notes

- In many territories UK stand-alone single "On My Radio" was included on the album: either as track 1, side one (with "Three Minute Hero" moved to track 7, side one and "They Make Me Mad" moved to track 3, side two) or added to side 2 as the first track.
- The album was reissued on CD by Captain Mod in 2001 and 2014 with the three bonus tracks: "The Selecter" (Neol Davies, John Bradbury) [3:00]; "On My Radio" (Davies) [3:06]; "Too Much Pressure" [B-side version] (Davies) [2:51].
- Five tracks on this album are cover versions: "My Collie (Not a Dog)" is a version of Millie's "My Boy Lollipop" rewritten to be about cannabis; "Murder" was originally recorded by Leon and Owen; "Carry Go Bring Come" was a hit record for Justin Hinds; "Time Hard" was originally recorded by the Pioneers; "James Bond" is a recording of the classic James Bond theme by Monty Norman, first done in a ska style by Roland Alphonso.

== Personnel ==
The Selecter

- Pauline Black – vocals
- Arthur "Gaps" Hendrickson – vocals
- Neol Davies – guitars
- Compton Amanor – guitars
- Desmond Brown – Hammond organ
- Charley Anderson – bass
- Charley "H" Bembridge – drums

Additional musicians

- Joe Reynolds – saxophone (1)
- Dick Cuthell – trumpet (11)
- Rico Rodriguez – trombone (11, 12)

Production and artwork

- Kim Templeman-Holmes - engineer
- David Storey, John "Teflon" Sims - sleeve design

"Special thanks to: Lynval, The Specials, Madness, Sarah Wills, Rick Rogers, Steve Allen, Chesterfield Audio, Bob, Mark 'Smuts' and all those who didn't."
