= Justin Hinds =

Jamaican ska vocalist

- Born: 7 May 1942; Steertown, Saint Ann Parish, Jamaica
- Origin: Jamaica
- Died: 16 March 2005 (aged 62)
- Genres: Ska; rocksteady; roots reggae; Rastafari; Nyabinghi
- Occupation: Vocalist
- Instrument: Vocals
- Labels: Treasure Isle, Island

Justin Hinds (7 May 1942 – 16 March 2005) was a Jamaican ska and conscious roots reggae vocalist with his backing singers the Dominoes.

He is best known for his work with Duke Reid's Treasure Isle Records, where his most notable song, "Carry Go Bring Come" recorded in late 1963, reached number one in Jamaica. Between 1964 and 1966, he recorded seventy singles, and was the label's popular artist.

== Biography ==
Hinds was born in Steertown, Saint Ann Parish, Jamaica. He started his musical career singing in bars and on the beach in Ocho Rios. Hinds moved to Kingston, Jamaica where he became influenced by Rastafari. He was turned down by Coxsone Dodd's label, but signed with Duke Reid's Treasure Isle Records. By this stage, the Dominoes consisting of Dennis Sinclair and Junior Dixon had become his backing vocalists.

=== Work with Duke Reid ===
His first recording with Duke Reid was "Carry Go Bring Come", made in late 1963 in one take. It became a big hit topping the Jamaican chart for two months, just before the Wailers got their big hit with "Simmer Down". "Carry Go Bring Come" was covered by the British ska band The Selecter on their 1980 album Too Much Pressure, and by Desmond Dekker and The Specials on King of Kings.

Hinds was one of the biggest acts in Jamaican music during the 1960s. Over the next couple of years, he released singles including "King Samuel", "Jump Out of the Frying Pan", "The Ark" and "Rub Up Push Up". He also worked with Tommy McCook and The Supersonics.

In 1966, he became active in rocksteady, a predecessor of reggae. He had several more hits in Jamaica including "The Higher the Monkey Climbs", "No Good Rudie", "On a Saturday Night", "Here I Stand" and "Save a Bread". Hinds parted company with Reid in 1972 as an artist, but was present when he died a few years later.

Justin Hinds was an example for his younger cousin, Horace Andy, who became a roots reggae and trip-hop musician.

=== Subsequent work ===
Hinds then worked with Jack Ruby which resulted in the 1976 album Jezebel. Reviewing it in Christgau's Record Guide: Rock Albums of the Seventies (1981), Robert Christgau wrote: "Homey lyrics ('Jah-jah will spank you') and artful instrumental touches—I like the gentle calypso-styled horns and decorative guitar licks—may mean this is a great reggae album. But they may mean it's only a subtle one, and in such an understated genre subtlety risks extinction."

Hinds' work with Sonia Pottinger resulted in a series of singles released in the late 1970s, including "Rig-Ma-Roe Game" and the Book of Proverbs and Psalm 121-inspired "Wipe Your Weeping Eyes", which he recorded with The Revolutionaries for Sonia Pottinger's High Note record label. After the release of Travel with Love recorded at Tuff Gong Studios in 1984, Hinds became less active. His final studio album Know Jah Better was released in 1992, but he worked on Wingless Angels with other Jamaican musicians, which was produced by Keith Richards in the early 1990s. In 1997, he toured the US for the first time and he released a couple of live albums in the early 2000s, including one recorded at the Finger Lakes GrassRoots Festival of Music and Dance in Trumansburg, New York backed by John Brown's Body.

On 23 September 2010, a new posthumous album, Wingless Angels II, was released with "Oh What a Joy, What a Comfort", featuring guitar work by Keith Richards plus the Jamaican Nyabinghi rhythm Drummers.

=== Death ===
Hinds died of lung cancer in March 2005, at the age of 62.
