= Walk the Walk (disambiguation) =

Walk the Walk is a 1970 exploitation film.

Walk the Walk may also refer to:

- "Walk the Walk", a song by Face to Face from Face to Face
- "Walk the Walk", a song by Poe from Haunted
- "Walk the Walk", a song by The Selecter from Subculture
- "Walk the Walk", a song by Special Ed from Revelations
- Walk the Walk, a charity founded by Nina Barough

== See also ==
- Walk the Walk...Talk the Talk, a 2011 album by the Head Cat
- Talk the Talk, a 2014 album by the Angels
