= Return of the Rudeboy =

Photography exhibition

Return of the Rudeboy was a photography exhibition created by the photographer and film-maker Dean Chalkley and the Creative Director Harris Elliott.

The Exhibition explores the significance of the influential style of "Rude Boy" in the 21st Century first took place in Somerset House in London running from 13 June to 25 August 2014.

The subjects of the photographs were more than 60 individuals whose style and swagger, Chalkley and Elliott, felt exemplify an important and rarely documented subculture. It featured the likes of Don Letts (Musician, DJ, Film Director influential in the unification of the punk and reggae scenes), Pauline Black (Lead singer of The Selecter), took the rude boy look and feminized it, Sam Lambert from (an Angolan designer and Art Comes First co-founder), Zoe Bedeaux (fashion stylist, designer and singer), Gary Powell (Drummer in The Libertines), Paul Gaba and many more notable people.

Across the 6 rooms, in the Terrace Rooms of Somerset House Chalkley and Elliott had produced and curated life-size, hand-printed images of the subjects who were shot over the course of a year leading up to the exhibition. With many of the photoshoots taking place in a variety of locations linked to the Rudeboy lifestyle. Dean and Harris also collaborated with notable contemporary artists and designers allied to the subculture, to present a prestigious collection of audio-visual and 3-D sartorial concepts including a stepper bicycle custom designed for the show and a barber shop, Suitcases were also included as a nod to Jamaicans & West Indians who emigrated to UK after WWII in their 'Sunday best', Mannequins displaying adapted clothes designed by Art Comes First (such as an oversized Buffalo had and a MA1 flight jacket), specially made artefacts by Kitty Farrow to display the 'Sunday Best' cultural ritual of the Rudeboy.
