= Made in Britain (album) =

Studio album by the Selecter
- Released: 4 September 2011
- Recorded: 2011
- Studio: Studio 64
- Genres: Ska; two-tone
- Length: 38:15
- Label: Vocaphone
- Producers: Pauline Black; Arthur "Gaps" Hendrickson; Neil Pyzer

The Selecter chronology
| Requiem for a Black Soul (2004) | Made in Britain (2011) | String Theory (2013) |

Singles from Made in Britain
- 1. "Big in the Body, Small in the Mind" Released: 23 July 2011

Made in Britain is the twelfth studio album by English ska and 2 Tone band the Selecter, released in 2011 on Vocaphone Records, their first album for the label. After reforming in 2010, Made in Britain was conceived after a PR company requested lead vocalist Pauline Black record a new album with the Selecter to coincide with her autobiography Black by Design. Black took the idea to record new material with the band seriously. The album was written and recorded quickly with production from several of the band members, with the experience pleasing band members.

The album, which uses a traditional ska and 2 Tone sound, found the band exploring their own and the public's relationship with the genre's equality, multiracial message. Mostly written by Black, the album's lyrics address numerous related social and political issues in 2010s multiracial Britain. The album was promoted with the singles "Big in the Body, Small in the Mind" and "Back to Black", and was released to positive reviews from critics, who saw the album's lyrics as relevant in the political climate of the day. The band toured in promotion of the album in 2011 and 2012, leading to the live album Made in Britain.

== Background and recording ==
After the release of The Selecter's acoustic studio album, Requiem for a Black Soul (2004), the band's vocalist and songwriter Pauline Black disbanded The Selecter, who had worked on and off since for fifteen years, in 2006, in order to concentrate on writing her autobiography Black by Design from 2007. However, "I started dipping my toe back in the water with music," Black later explained, "and decided to put the Selecter back together in 2010." With an extended line-up of original members Black and fellow vocalist Arthur "Gaps" Hendrickson, alongside drummer Winston Marche, keyboardist Greg Coutson, guitarist Anthony Harty, bassist The Emperor Mingus, and saxophonists and multi-instrumentalists Neil Pyzer and Grande La Rose, the band prepared to re-launch The Selecter onto the ska scene in 2011, and felt it was important to record new music.

The genesis for Made in Britain came about when the band's London tour manager introduced Black to a PR company that were aiming to do PR on Black's autobiography Black by Design. Black suggested to the company that, to promote the book, The Selecter record a cover version of Amy Winehouse's "Back to Black", an idea they had been keeping for a while, as well as record their original song "Big in the Body, Small in the Mind," and release them as a single. Black explained: "I said would you be interested in promoting those as singles alongside the book, then we'll release them as the year goes by?" The company denied her offer because they found albums to be more fashionable than singles, so asked her to record a new Selecter album instead.

Black returned home that weekend, where the band discussed the album together and then "put it together over that weekend and then went and recorded it." Made in Britain was recorded and mixed at Studio 64, with production from Black, Hendrickson and Pyzer, the latter of whom also mixed the record. The album was finished in less than a month, due to the band having songs ready when they recorded the album. Black explained that, despite the album's roots, Made in Britain turned out to be "a really nice calling card for everybody involved."

== Lyrics and music ==
=== Conception and style ===
"Almost picking up where the original band left off, Made in Britain is solidly rooted in the band’s origins in 2 Tone and the lyrics explore the social and political issues which continue to face us all in 21st century multicultural Britain."

— Helen G of The F-Word

On Made in Britain, the band stated that they "just wanted to have a conversation basically about where The Selecter was at, where we were at in relation to 2 Tone." The band had felt that during the intervening time between 2 Tone music's early 1980s heyday and the making of the album, the genre's message had somewhat metamorphosed into multiculturalism. Pauline Black explained, since "coming back into the ska arena," the band "felt very much that the anti-racist stance had moved on. The language had moved on. Most countries all over the world now live in a multi-cultural environment. Multiculturalism was the new buzzword: people with different backgrounds, different faiths, different cultures, rubbing along together and getting along okay, which largely they do."

As such, according to Black, the album documents this, showing the band talking about "what The Selecter usually talks about," the band's surroundings and "what's going on around you." The lyrics and themes on the album, mostly written by Black, stay relevant to the political climate of the 2010s. According to Helen G of The F-Word, the album is a unified whole, "where the trademark socially conscious lyrics are given a musical setting which neither submerges nor subtracts from the message." Musically, the album harks back to the band's early sound, retaining "the superficially easy-going grooves of ska and reggae." While the sound of the album sometimes is given the "distinctive sheen" of digital technology, Helen G of The F-Word said the production does not overshadow the content.

=== Songs ===
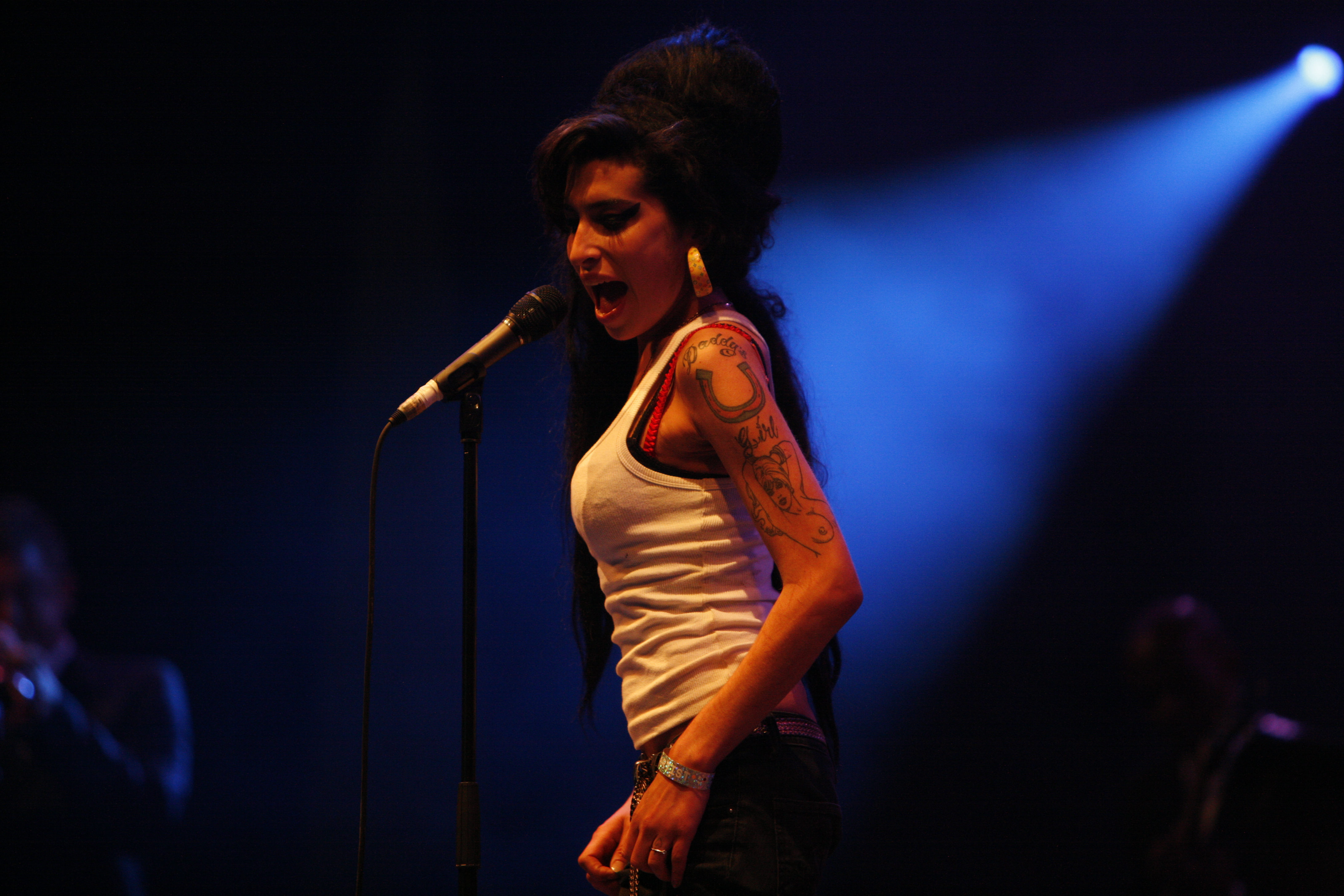
"Back to Black" is a cover of the Amy Winehouse song.

The opening song, "Big in the Body, Small in the Mind", is the band's reworking of "All You Fascists Bound to Lose" by Woody Guthrie, and sets out the album's anti-racist agenda. It features a solid rhythm "interwoven with a sinewy horn section." "Fuck Art, Let's Dance" takes a look into the band's history, while "Back to Black", featuring particularly soulful vocals from Black, is a cover version of the Amy Winehouse song. "My England", written about the causes of riots, is one of the album's most topical songs; "While many things have changed in society over the past three decades," Helen G said, "too many issues remain the same: racism, disenfranchisement, disempowerment, unemployment, poverty, cuts in public services, the seemingly unstoppable rise of right wing politics and the marginalisation of a sizeable proportion of the population from a ruling elite fixated on the twin fetishes of consumerism and materialism."

"They Make Me Mad" is a re-recording of the song from the band's debut album Too Much Pressure (1980); the song's lyrics, especially the line "Now that things have changed, I make my mind up for myself, I look back on all those words, there’s little meaning in their sound," were described "as relevant as they ever were in their attack on the divisive rhetoric of the privileged." The album's closing song is "Second Skin", which focuses on the presence of a multicultural society that has existed for many years, and that "the acceptance of this by the powers that be is still sadly lacking." After the recording of the album, but prior to its release, the 2011 England riots took place, and Black felt that the album became "kinda strangely prescient" of its events: "Just the titles of some of the songs, there's one called 'My England' which is very much about what leads to riots. One of the lines is 'living in a wasteland of crack and guns', you know? It's a bit of a no-brainer in some ways, why this is happened."

== Release ==
The band signed a record deal with Vocaphone Records, owned by band member Neil Pyzer, who, ahead of the album's released, issued "Big in the Body, Small in the Mind" as a seven-inch single on 23 July 2011 to promote the album, with "Back to Black" placed as its B-side. "Back to Black" was also issued as a promotional single, Vocaphone released Made in Britain as a CD and LP in the United Kingdom on 4 August 2011. Coincidentally, due to the album's content, the release of the album coincided with, in Black's words, "this whole situation in England that's destroying people's communities," such as the aforementioned riots. In promotion of the album, the band performed the Made in Britain Tour in September 2011, and continued to promote the album live when they performed the sell-out follow-up Made in Britain Tour 2012 throughout the entirety of March 2012.

The Made in Britain Tour 2012 began on 1 March at Sub 89, Reading, and although by 31 March they had reached Erics in Liverpool, the band played two further gigs, one the next day at Regent, Ipswich and another on 6 April at Junction, Cambridge. The Made in Britain Tour 2012 was described as combining "much onstage banter, focused mostly on current social and political issues," with a selection of songs from Made in Britain and older songs. On 4 October 2012, the band released Live in Britain on Vocaphone, a live album recorded on the tour.

== Reception ==
Professional ratings
Review scores
| Source | Rating |
|---|---|
| The F-Word | (favourable) |
| Martin C. Strong | 5/10 |
| Mojo | 3/5 stars |

Upon release, Made in Britain received positive reviews from critics. Although, in The Great Rock Discography, writer Martin C. Strong, who himself rated the album five out of ten, noted the record was "given a review by-pass from most of the media," Lucy O'Brian of Mojo rated the album three stars out of five, saying the record shows the band "have shifted up a gear to provide an album that would sit comfortably next to [...] Too Much Pressure, but it's when Black steps out of her comfort zone as with her reggae reading of Amy Winehouse's 'Back to Black' that she moves forward, capturing the singer at her vocal best". Andy Peart of Vive Le Rock hailed the album as "brilliant." Holly Combe of The F-Word noted the "relevance of the lyrics and themes in today’s political climate," while, saying the record "makes a fine companion to anything you might have heard on 2 Tone back in the 1980s," Helen G of The F-Word was similarly very favourable towards the record, also noting the album's relevance in the contemporary political climate, said:

"If there’s one thing that strikes me from listening to Made in Britain, it’s how many parallels still exist today to the society which saw the coming of punk, New Wave and 2 Tone. This is music with a message which is as relevant to our times as it was 30 years ago: a multicultural society has more to offer us all if we unite to fight our common enemies – particularly (but not exclusively) sexism and racism – rather than fighting each other over lines drawn in the sand by those who benefit from keeping us divided."

"Back to Black" was made "Single of the Week" in Metro on 24 July 2011, who referred to it as "an effortless ska pop groove." The Scottish Daily Record rated the single four stars out of five, noting the coincidence that Winehouse had only recently died, and saying "it's a classic ska cut. Frankly, brilliant." The band's follow-up to Made in Britain, String Theory (2013), saw the band develop the lyrical stance they took on Made in Britain: Pauline Black said: "We wanted to take that on further. People still find their differences." She felt that Made in Britain was their "return album as it were, and that very much discussed multiculturalism and how things were today, and what Two Tone’s legacy was in this new century. We wanted to move it on from that, and I think we've very much managed to do that with String Theory. I look at Made in Britain and think to myself it is touching the same areas I think as our debut album, Too Much Pressure."

== Track listing ==
All tracks composed by Pauline Black, Arthur Henderson and Neil Pyzer; except where indicated

1. "Big in the Body, Small in the Mind" (Traditional; arranged by Black, Henderson and Pyzer)
2. "Fuck Art, Let's Dance"
3. "Back to Black" (Amy Winehouse, Mark Ronson)
4. "Think About That" (Robert Livingstone Thompson, E. Mulby)
5. "The Time of Lives"
6. "My England"
7. "My Good Bad-Minded Friends"
8. "Bangin' on a Big Drum"
9. "They Made Me Mad" (Pauline Black)
10. "Second Skin"

== Personnel ==
The Selecter

- Pauline Black – vocals, production
- Arthur "Gaps" Hendrickson – vocals, production
- Neil Pyzer – flute, saxophone, guitars, keyboards, production, recording, mixing
- Greg Coulson – keyboards
- Anthony Harty – guitar
- Orlando La Rose – flute, saxophone
- The Emperor Mingus – bass
- Winston Marche – drums

with:

- Beverley Skeete – backing vocals
- Sara-Jane Skeete – backing vocals
