= Wingless Angels (band) =

Jamaican band

- Origin: Steertown, Jamaica
- Genres: Reggae
- Years active: 1990s; 2000s; 2010s
- Labels: Mindless Records, LLC
- Past members: Justin Hinds; Winston "Black Skull" Thomas; Milton "Bongo Neville" Beckerd "Bongo" Locksey Whitlock; Warrin Williamson; Maureen Fremantle; Vincent "Jackie" Ellis; Bongo Jackie

Wingless Angels were a Jamaican Rastafari reggae group led by Justin Hinds, best known for their self-titled album executive produced by Keith Richards and issued on his Mindless Records imprint.

== History ==
Veteran reggae musician Justin Hinds had by the 1990s moved back to live in his rural home town of Steertown near Ocho Rios where he led a group of nyabinghi musicians, including Winston "Black Skull" Thomas (who had previously worked with Talking Heads and Bad Brains), Milton "Bongo Neville" Beckerd, "Bongo" Locksey Whitlock, Warrin Williamson, Maureen Fremantle (aka Sister Maureen), Vincent "Jackie" Ellis, and Bongo Jackie (aka Iron Lion). Rolling Stones guitarist Keith Richards had bought a home in Ocho Rios in the mid-1970s and befriended Hinds. Richards and producer Rob Fraboni recorded the group one evening in 1995 playing in his own living room, shortly after the death of Bongo Jackie, and with overdubs added by himself, Blondie Chaplin, and Irish violinist Frankie Gavin, he released the recordings as an album on his own Mindless Records imprint (via Island Records) in 1997, dubbing the group "Wingless Angels".

The album was reissued on keithrichards.com in 2003 and by Polygram in 2008.

Recordings made shortly before the death of Justin Hinds were issued in September 2010 on Mindless Records as Wingless Angels II, the last known recording of Justin Hinds.

== Discography ==
- Wingless Angels (October 1997), Mindless/Island Jamaica
- Wingless Angels II (23 September 2010), Mindless Records
- Wingless Angels Deluxe Edition (23 September 2010), Mindless Records
