= The Skalatones =

Swedish ska band

- Origin: Landskrona, Sweden
- Genres: Ska
- Years active: 1995–2001
- Labels: Sidekicks Records, Pork Pie Records
- Past members: Michael Svegbrandt, Nick Anderberg, Mike Salonen, Charley Anderson, Jonas Karlsson, Hansi Josefsson, Monk, Janne Rantala, Jonas Olsson, Lars Odeholm, Björn Engqvist, Kaj Basun

The Skalatones were a Swedish ska band, formed in 1995 in Landskrona. They have been compared to The Specials, The Selecter and Madness.

== History ==
The group's first album, which came out in 1997, was "By Public Demand". In 1998, they released the EP "Mr Probation Officer", followed by another EP, "Ruder Than Roots" and then the compilation "The Best Tracks So Far" on the label Pork Pie.

Their second album emerged in 1999: Tune In.... This led to the single Anniversary Single 2YK in 2000. The band broke up in 2001.

In 2007, members of The Skalatones formed a new ska band, Mobster.

== Discography ==
=== Album ===
- 1997: By Public Demand
- 1999: Tune In...

=== Compilations ===
- 1998: The Best Tracks So Far

=== EPs ===
- 1998: Mr Probation Officer
- 1998: Ruder Than Roots

=== Singles ===
- 2000: Anniversary Single 2YK
