= Daylight (The Selecter album) =

Studio album by the Selecter
- Released: 6 October 2017
- Length: 39:44
- Label: DMF Music
- Producer: Neil Pyzer; Tim Bran

The Selecter chronology
Subculture (2015)	Daylight (2017)	Human Algebra (2023)

Professional ratings
Aggregate scores
Source	Rating
Metacritic	71/100
Review scores
Source	Rating
AllMusic	3.5/5 stars
Punknews.org	4/5 stars
Record Collector	4/5 stars

Daylight is the fifteenth studio album by the English band the Selecter. It was released on 6 October 2017 through DMF Music.

== Critical reception ==
SF Weekly wrote that the album "hears the group as energized as ever for an urgent and powerful record proving that the group is still open to creative evolution." LA Weekly called the album "engagingly soulful." Uncut wrote that "much of this is rather pedestrian ska with blandly topical lyrics."

== Track listing ==
All tracks composed by Pauline Black, Arthur Hendrickson and Neil Pyzer; except where noted.

Daylight track listing
No.	Title	Writer(s)	Length
1.	"Frontline"		3:40
2.	"Remember Me"	Black; Hendrickson; Pyzer; Bruneau	4:32
3.	"Daylight"		3:46
4.	"The Big Badoof"		4:09
5.	"Paved with Cold"		4:22
6.	"Taking Back Control"	Black; Hendrickson; Pyzer; Beverley Skeete	3:17
7.	"Things Fall Apart"		4:09
8.	"Mayhem"		3:43
9.	"3 Reasons"		3:47
10.	"Pass the Power"	Black; Hendrickson; Pyzer; Beverley Skeete	4:19

== Personnel ==
The Selecter

- Pauline Black – vocals
- Arthur "Gaps" Hendrickson – vocals
- Neil Pyzer – saxophone, guitar, keyboards, vocals, string arrangements
- Will Crewdson – guitar
- Luke Palmer – bass guitar
- Lee Horsley – organ
- Orlando La Rose – saxophone, flute, piccolo flute
- Winston Marche – drums

with:

- Tim Bran – piano (on tracks 2, 4, 5, 8, 10), keyboards on "Daylight", string arrangements
- John Robertson – guitar on "Remember Me" and "Things Fall Apart"
- Adrian Large – guitar on "Paved With Cold", "Things Fall Apart" and "Pass the Power"
- Jools Holland – piano on "Daylight"
- Graham Cuttill – percussion
- James Lawrence – trombone (on tracks 1. 3, 5–7, 10)
- Audrey Riley, Chris Tombling – strings on "Daylight", "Mayhem" and "Pass the Power"
- Beverley Skeete – backing vocals
- Marizia Pyzer-Skeete – backing vocals on "Taking Back Control"

== Chart ==
Chart performance for Daylight
Chart (2017)	Peak position
UK Albums (OCC)	66
