= Skinhead Girl =

Studio album by the Specials
- Released: 17 October 2000
- Genre: Ska
- Length: 49:04
- Label: Receiver
- Producer: Roger Lomas

The Specials chronology
Stereo-Typical: A's, B's and Rarities (2000)	Skinhead Girl (2000)	Conquering Ruler (2001)

Professional ratings
Review scores
Source	Rating
Allmusic	link

Skinhead Girl is a cover album by the Specials Released in 2000 (see 2000 in music). After a project backing ska legend Desmond Dekker on his 1993 album King of Kings, producer Roger Lomas brought the band back into the studio to record covers of popular Trojan Records songs. Band member Lynval Golding left two weeks before the sessions, and was replaced by former Selecter guitarist Neol Davies on rhythm guitar.

== Track listing ==
1. "I Can't Hide" (Ken Parker) - 3:32
2. "Blam Blam Fever" (Carl Grant, V. Grant) - 3:25
3. "Jezebel" (Wayne Shanklin) - 2:43
4. "El Pussycat Ska" (Roland Alphonso, Clement Dodd) - 3:40
5. "Soldering" (Ewart Beckford) - 4:06
6. "You Don't Know Like I Know" (Isaac Hayes, David Porter) - 2:36
7. "Memphis Underground" (Herbie Mann) - 3:56
8. "If I Didn't Love You" (Eric "Monty" Morris) - 3:42
9. "Them a Fe Get a Beatin'" (Peter Tosh) - 3:28
10. "Napoleon Solo" (Hopeton Lewis) - 3:09
11. "Skinhead Girl" (Monty Neysmith) - 3:31
12. "Fire Corner" (Clancy Eccles) - 3:47
13. "Bangerang Crash" (Eccles) - 3:04
14. "I Want to Go Home" (Derrick Morgan) - 2:39
15. "Old Man Say" (Eccles) - 2:46

== Personnel ==
- Neville Staple - vocals
- Roddy Byers - vocals, guitar
- Horace Panter - bass guitar
- Neol Davies - rhythm guitar
- Justin Dodsworth - keyboards
- Steve Holdway - trombone
- Paul Daleman - trumpet
- Leigh Malin - tenor saxophone
- Anthony Harty - percussion, drums
- Roger Lomas - producer, mixing, engineer
