= Gangsters (song) =

- Cover of the single released in the Netherlands

Single by the Specials
- B-side: The Selecter (by The Selecter)
- Released: 4 May 1979
- Recorded: January 1979
- Studio: Horizon Studios, Coventry
- Genre: Ska; 2-tone; pop
- Length: 2:47
- Label: 2 Tone
- Songwriter: Jerry Dammers
- Producer: Special A.K.A.

The Specials singles chronology
"Gangsters" (1979)	"Nite Klub" / "A Message to You, Rudy" (1979)

The Selecter singles chronology
"The Selecter" (1979)	"On My Radio" (1979)

"Gangsters" is the first single by the English ska group the Specials.

== Recording and release ==
"Gangsters" was recorded in January 1979 in Studio One of Horizon Studios in Coventry. Horace Panter recalls that the song "had so much bass on it that it had to be recut as the bass blew the needle out of the record's grooves" and that "to compensate for the low end, Jerry [Dammers] overdubbed a treble-heavy piano on". The vocals were created by Terry Hall singing a "bored" vocal and an "angry" vocal, which were then mixed together.

Versions of "Nite Klub" and "Too Much Too Young" were also recorded, but it was decided they didn't quite work, so the band then had to find a B-side to "Gangsters". John Bradbury, who had only recently joined the band, replacing Silverton Hutchinson, suggested a instrumental track he had recorded in 1977 with Neol Davies, called "The Kingston Affair". Dammers asked Davies to put a ska rhythm guitar on the song and it was then retitled "The Selecter", becoming the B-side to "Gangsters".

A limited 5,000 copies of the track were distributed by the fledgling 2 Tone record label in May 1979, as a double A-side along with "The Selecter", which was credited to the Selecter, who were Neol Davies, John Bradbury and Barry Jones. The actual wording of the original single is 'The Special A.K.A Gangsters vs. The Selecter', with the 'vs.' being the idea of Dammers, from a poster advertising a sound system battle.

It was given a full release two months later, and went on to reach No. 6 in the UK charts for the week ending 1 September 1979, becoming both The Specials' and the 2 Tone label's first hit record. The single was first aired on John Peel's Radio 1 show on Monday 7 May, where he was so pleased with it that he played the other side as well.

== History ==
The song is about an incident that happened to the band while on tour in France with the Clash. They were held responsible for damage in a hotel that another English band (rumoured to be The Damned) had caused, and the hotel manager held one of their guitars as collateral. The situation escalated when the hotel called the local police, and ended with the Specials paying for the damage.

The song is a reworking of Prince Buster's 1964 ska song "Al Capone", sampling the car sound effects that opened that song. The opening line "Al Capone's guns don't argue" was changed to "Bernie Rhodes knows, don't argue" as an insult aimed at Bernard Rhodes, who had briefly been the band's manager.

Despite being a top 10 hit, the song did not appear on the UK version of any studio album by the band, although it was included on some overseas releases of their first album.

== Charts ==
=== Weekly charts ===
Chart (1979–80)	Peak position
Belgium (Ultratop 50 Flanders)	6
France (IFOP)	3
Ireland (IRMA)	27
Netherlands (Dutch Top 40)	13
Netherlands (Single Top 100)	11
New Zealand (Recorded Music NZ)	20
UK Singles (OCC)	6

=== Year-end charts ===
Chart (1979)	Position
Belgium (Ultratop Flanders)	89
UK Singles (BMRB)	59

Chart (1980)	Position
France (IFOP)	56
