= Missing Words =

Single by the Selecter

from the album Too Much Pressure
- B-side: "Carry Go Bring Come"
- Released: 1980
- Genre: Ska
- Length: 3:22
- Label: 2 Tone CHS TT 10
- Songwriter: Neol Davies
- Producer: Roger Lomas

The Selecter singles chronology
"Three Minute Hero" (1980)	"Missing Words" (1980)	"The Whisper" (1980)

Music video
- "Missing Words" on YouTube

"Missing Words" is a song and single written by Neol Davies and performed by the English 2 tone ska revival band the Selecter. Released in 1980, it reached No. 23 on the UK singles chart, staying there for eight weeks.

== Background ==
In contrast to the Selecter's two previous singles, "On My Radio" and "Three Minute Hero", "Missing Words" is a downbeat song about heartbreak issued as the 2 Tone Records ska revival began to fade.
