= Horizon Studios =

Horizon Studios was a set of recording studios in Coventry, England. They were created from a converted stable near Coventry Station by entrepreneur Barry Thomas. They were used to record music by 2-Tone bands such as Bad Manners, The Selecter and The Specials. The Rocket pub nearby was associated with the studios as it was often used for refreshments. Both places have been demolished but are commemorated by plaques at the station.
