= John Bradbury (drummer) =

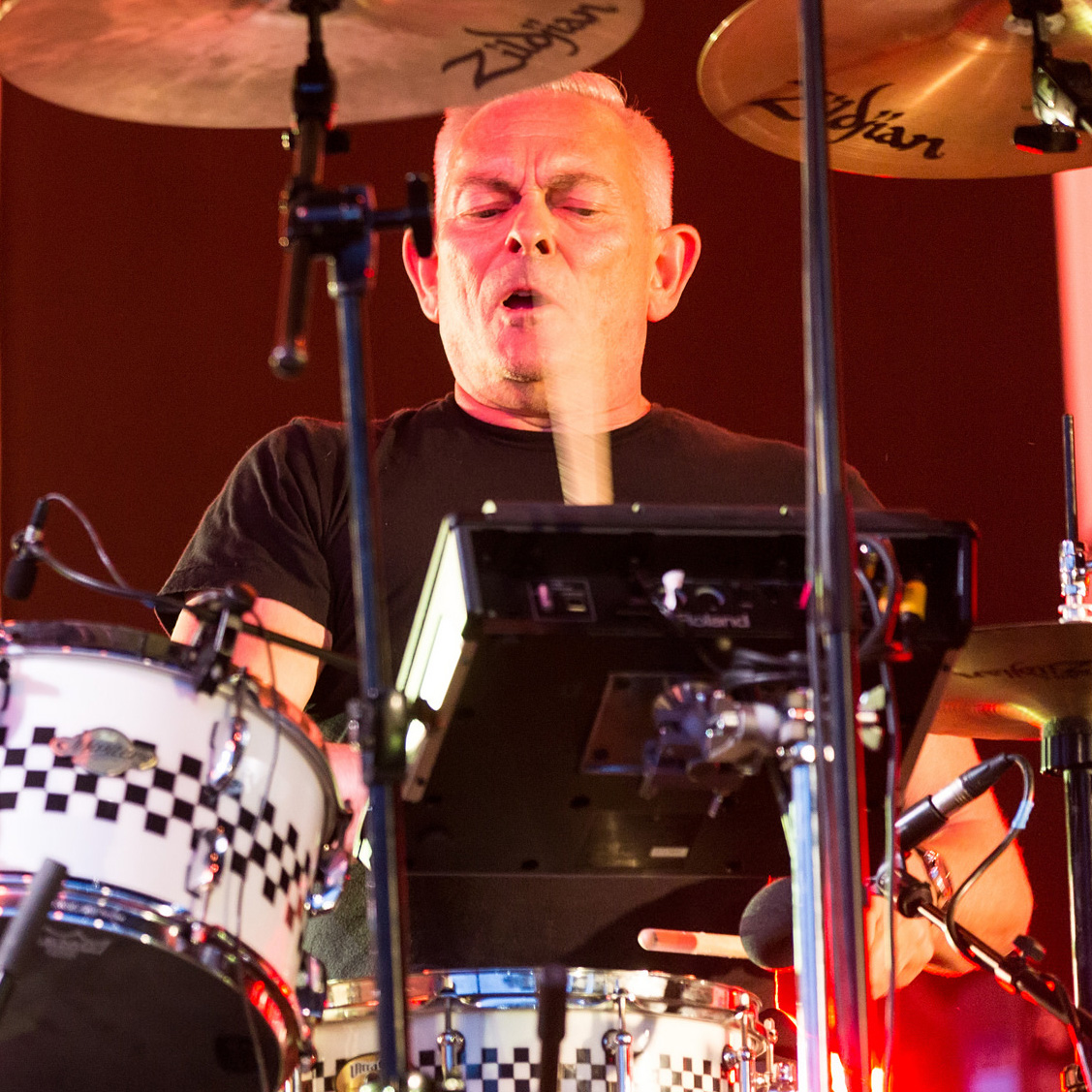
- Bradbury performing live with The Specials in 2015

Background information
- Also known as: Brad, JB
- Born: John Bradbury; 16 February 1953; Coventry, England
- Died: 28 December 2015 (aged 62)
- Genres: Soul; ska; reggae
- Occupations: Drummer; multi-instrumentalist; record producer; activist
- Instruments: Drums; vocals; synthesizer; piano; keyboards; congas; bongos
- Years active: 1968–2015
- Labels: RCA Victor; EMI; Chrysalis; Two Tone
- Website: www.thespecials.com

John "Brad" Bradbury (16 February 1953 – 28 December 2015) was an English drummer and record producer. He is best known for having been the drummer in the English ska group The Specials.

== Early life and education ==
Bradbury was born in Coventry, where his father, Bert, was a painter and decorator for the council, and his mother, Joan, worked first for GEC (she was a shop steward) and then at Walsgrave Hospital, where she helped with care in the maternity ward. She was staunchly anti-racist and concerned with immigrants’ rights, and her views had a powerful effect on her son. He became fascinated by drumming as a child, and when he was eight his mum bought him a drum kit. According to his sister, Jill, "she then put egg boxes on the walls to stop the sound reaching the neighbours". Bradbury had three elder sisters, and it was they who took him to clubs and first introduced him to northern soul.

He attended Binley Park school in Coventry, and went on to study fine art at Hull Art College. Later he took a teaching course in Birmingham, where he taught art and English. Back in Coventry, he became part of a small group of former art students and music fans who included Jerry Dammers, with whom he shared a house. "We had friends in common, but at that time I didn’t know he could play drums," said Dammers. It was while he was working at the Virgin record store in Coventry that Brad first met Terry Hall, another music fan with similar taste. "We grew up two streets away from each other," said Hall, "but hadn’t met. He was like my older brother. He took me under his wing and looked after me."

== Career ==
Bradbury was asked to join the Specials after their original percussionist ("a strict reggae drummer" called Silverton Hutchinson, according to bassist Horace Panter) had left. He made his first appearance with the band on their first hit single, "Gangsters", which was remarkable for having a song by a completely different band, the Selecter, on the B-side. Stranger still, the drummer playing on that Selecter track happened to be Brad.

Bradbury played a crucial role in the history of the Specials, the still massively successful multiracial band that first shook up the British music scene in the late 1970s and early '80s by mixing Jamaican ska with punk energy, a bravely political stance and good humour. They were that rarity, a thoughtful band who created great dance music, and Bradbury was central to their distinctive style. According to the band’s bass player, Horace Panter: "He called his approach ‘attack drumming’ and it became the Specials’ signature sound. He mixed the drive of northern soul with a reggae feel. And he improvised. He was different every night."

With the Specials he toured Britain, packing out dancehalls where followers showed their respect by wearing the uniform of pork pie hats and black-and-white sweaters. This was the era of the National Front, and NF supporters were eager to break up the multiracial party. Brad once explained: "They would position themselves so they could sling abuse … and objects, if they got the chance. But they usually didn’t get the chance, because we would stop mid-number, put the spotlight on the ring-leader, and the audience would take care of the rest."

Bradbury helped the Specials to become the outstanding British band of 1979, both for their recordings and live performances. Many of their best-known songs were written by Dammers, but Bradbury was involved in co-writing favourites that included "Gangsters" and "Nite Klub". The band recorded seven UK top 10 singles, including two number 1 singles "Too Much Too Young" and "Ghost Town", but split up in 1981. Bradbury continuing to work with Dammers in the Special AKA, best known for that classic political anthem "Nelson Mandela".

For Dammers, the group’s founder and keyboard player, Bradbury was "highly intelligent, had a mischievous sense of humour which could be very funny, and he played the drums with an incredible amount of energy which was a very important part of the Specials’ sound and live shows". For the singer Terry Hall, he was simply "a great drummer".

=== JB's Allstars ===
After the Specials split, and while still involved with the Special AKA, Bradbury started his own band, JB's Allstars, influenced by northern soul. They released five singles, including their version of the Mel & Tim song, "Backfield in Motion" (1984) which made the charts. They also released "Alphabet Army" (1986), a song written by Bradbury that stressed the importance of teachers.

Further activities

There followed a period of over 20 years in which it seemed that his music career had stalled. He looked after his son, Elliot, while his wife, Emily, worked in the fashion industry, and he was involved in a series of projects that included computer programming and maintenance.

== The Specials reunion ==
Bradbury played a key role in reuniting the band (though now without Dammers).

His life changed dramatically with their triumphant comeback at the Bestival festival on the Isle of Wight in September 2008. The band proved that they could still attract large and enthusiastic crowds, even without Dammers, and set off on extensive tours across the UK, Europe, North America and the Far East. In 2011 they packed out Alexandra Palace in London, where more than 10,000 people sang along to "Ghost Town", a song that has as much relevance today as it did in the early '80s. The live album The Specials: More or Less (2012) was a well-produced reminder that the band could still do justice to their classic repertoire – and that Bradbury was still in powerful form behind the drums. "These songs have survived because they address issues that are still there," he said.

In 2014, the Specials’ four-night stint in London included three shows at the Roundhouse, and in 2015 their tours included Mexico and Chile. For 2016, they had planned a five-night run at the Troxy, London. A fitness enthusiast, Bradbury had seemed as energetic as ever, and massively excited by the prospect of the first new Specials songs since the '80s.

== Death ==
Bradbury died aged 62 on 28 December 2015, just as the Specials were beginning to embark on a new project. He had talked enthusiastically about the new material he had been writing, and Hall says that the band had "just started recording new material, including his songs. We'd been talking about it for years."

He was survived by his wife Emily, whom he married in 1987, and only son Elliot born 1988.

== Influences ==
Bradbury cited his main influences as Al Jackson Jr. and Sly Dunbar.
