= The F-Word (blog) =

British feminist website

- Website type: Feminist website
- Available in: English language
- Owner: Catherine Redfern
- Creator: Catherine Redfern
- Website: www.thefword.org.uk
- Launched: 2001; 25 years ago

The F-Word is a UK-based feminist website founded by Catherine Redfern in 2001, initially as a forum for young feminists. The F-Word has since turned into a contemporary feminist website containing features, blog pieces and reviews on hot-topic feminist issues.

Aims and objectives of the F-Word are to provide a place for a new feminist voice, with analytical thinking on contemporary issues, and create a safe supportive environment for readers and contributors.

The website was originally named The F-Word to encompass the idea that feminism is seen as taboo for young women, with Redfern subsequently composing the website of all young women contributors. However, in 2003, the site changed its tagline from "young" to "contemporary", welcoming contributors of all ages.

== The site ==
Current categories on the website are Politics, Film and TV, Stage, Books, Music and Life. The F-Word also features reviews of comics, art, books, comedy, events, films, magazines, music, television and theatre, along with hosting a blog containing posts from selected guests and regular writers.

The blog was added to the site in 2005, covering a range of political and feminist topics of the time, including Harriet Harman's tip-of-the-hat for the deputy prime minister job, homophobic bullying, pornography, abortion and women's oppression in Iraq.

The site was edited by Catherine Redfern 2001-2007 and Jess McCabe 2007–2013. It has functioned under a rotating editor system since 2013, with the editor changing yearly.

== Recognition ==
In 2002, the site was "Highly Commended" by the Women in Publishing New Venture Awards and Redfern was named in The Guardian as one of 50 Women to Watch the following year.

It was listed in The Guardian as one of The World's 50 Most Powerful Blogs in 2008.
