= Neol Davies =

British musician and composer

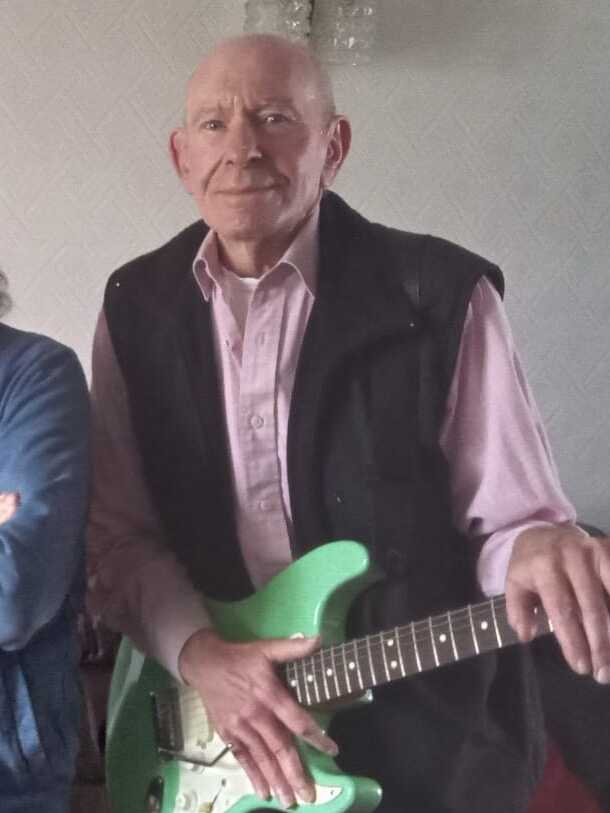
- Davies in 2023

Background information
- Birth name: Neol Edward Davies
- Born: 26 April 1952 (age 73); Coventry, England
- Genres: Ska; 2 tone; new wave; blues
- Occupations: Musician; composer
- Instrument: Guitar
- Labels: VoMatic; London International Ska Festival
- Member of: Neol Davies' Selecter
- Formerly of: The Specials
- Website: neoldavies.com

Neol Edward Davies (born 26 April 1952) is an English musician, composer and original member and founder of 2 tone ska revival band the Selecter.

Born in Coventry, Davies wrote the instrumental tune "The Selecter" from which the band got their name in 1979. It was a double A-side with "Gangsters" by the Special AKA, which was the first 2 Tone Records single and reached 6 in the UK Singles Chart in July 1979. Davies formed the seven piece band the Selecter and wrote their hit songs "On My Radio", "Missing Words", "Three Minute Hero" and "The Whisper".

Davies started up his own home studio after the band disbanded in 1981 to write and record his own new songs, and he played a number of local shows in the Midlands. Davies formed a new version of the Selecter in 1991 with Pauline Black, however he left the band two years later. He started up a new outfit called Selecter Instrumental, mostly playing movie tunes in a ska style. In the early 1990s, he joined a reunited Specials in the studio, contributing rhythm guitar to sessions that would later be released as the cover albums Skinhead Girl (2000) and Conquering Ruler (2001). In 1998, he released his debut solo studio album Box of Blues, assisted by bass player Horace Panter of the Specials and drummer Anthony Harty, and the trio often performed at a number of blues concerts in the UK. He later recorded another solo studio album, Future Swamp (2002), with guests including Ronnie Wood of the Rolling Stones and Reef members Dominic Greensmith and Jason Knight. Both albums were released on Davies' own label, VoMatic Records.

== Discography ==
Solo studio albums

- Box of Blues (1998)
- Future Swamp (2002)
