= Three Minute Hero =

Single by the Selecter

from the album Too Much Pressure
- B-side: "James Bond"
- Released: 1980
- Studio: Horizon Studios (Coventry)
- Genre: 2 tone; ska
- Length: 3:00
- Label: 2 Tone CHS TT 8
- Songwriter: Neol Davies
- Producers: Errol Ross; the Selecter

The Selecter singles chronology
"On My Radio" (1979)	"Three Minute Hero" (1980)	"The Whisper" (1980)

Music video
- "Three Minute Hero" on YouTube

"Three Minute Hero" is a song and single written by Neol Davies and performed by the English 2 tone ska revival band the Selecter. It is the opening track on side one of their debut studio album Too Much Pressure. Released in 1980, the song spent six weeks on the UK Singles Chart., peaking at number 16.
