= On My Radio (song) =

- Cover of the single released in the Netherlands

Single by the Selecter
- B-side: "Too Much Pressure"
- Released: 5 October 1979
- Recorded: 1979
- Studio: Horizon Studios (Coventry)
- Genre: Reggae; pop; 2 tone
- Length: 3:15
- Label: 2 Tone
- Songwriter: Neol Davies
- Producer: Roger Lomas

The Selecter singles chronology
"The Selecter" (1979)	"On My Radio" (1979)	"Three Minute Hero" (1980)

Music video
- "On My Radio" on YouTube

"On My Radio" is a song by the English 2 tone ska revival band the Selecter, released as a single on 5 October 1979 by 2 Tone Records. It peaked at number 8 on the UK singles chart, remaining on the chart for nine weeks, and became their most successful single.

== Background and recording ==
"On My Radio" was originally written by Neol Davies whilst a member of another band, the Transposed Men, before the Selecter had been formed. "On My Radio" criticises radio as seen with the lyric "It's just the same old show on my radio", but also jokes at the expense of radio that the singer's lover prefers to listen to the radio than to them.

Interest in the Selecter had grown after the release of their first single "The Selecter" which had been released earlier in 1979 as the B-side to the split single "Gangsters" by the Special A.K.A. They supported the Specials on tour and signed to 2 Tone Records, who gave them £1,000 to record a single.

At Coventry's Horizon Studios, however, the group did not want to record "On My Radio" as a single, as they thought it sounded "like a Eurovision entry". Record producer Roger Lomas eventually persuaded them to record three songs (the other two being the eventual B-side "Too Much Pressure" and "Street Feeling") and let the record label decide on which to release as a single. The song is also noted for its unusual 7/4 time signature, instead of the common 4/4, which lead vocalist Pauline Black says was "because we just didn't know the rules".

"On My Radio" peaked at number 29 on the NME Top Singles of 1979. In 2008, Freaky Trigger placed the song at number 44 in its list of "The Top 100 Songs of All Time".

== Track listing ==
7" Single (CHS TT 4)

1. "On My Radio" – 3:15
2. "Too Much Pressure" – 2:47

== Charts ==
Chart (1979–80)	Peak position
Belgium (Ultratop 50 Flanders)	8
Netherlands (Dutch Top 40)	10
Netherlands (Single Top 100)	13
UK Singles (OCC)	8
