= Pauline Black =

English singer, actress, and author

Pauline Black OBE DL
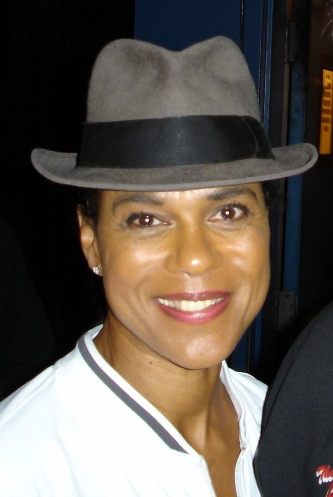
- Black in San Francisco, 2005

Background information
- Born: Belinda Magnus; 23 October 1953 (age 72); Romford, Essex, England
- Genres: Ska; two-tone; new wave
- Occupations: Singer; actress; author
- Instrument: Vocals
- Years active: 1979–present
- Labels: 2 Tone; Chrysalis
- Member of: The Selecter
- Spouse: Terry Button (m. 1980)
- Website: paulineblack.com

Belinda Magnus OBE DL (born 23 October 1953), better known as Pauline Black, is an English singer, actress and author.

In a music career spanning more than 40 years, Black came to prominence in the late 1970s as the lead singer of the 2 Tone ska revival band the Selecter, which released four singles that entered the Top 40 charts in the United Kingdom during the 1970s and the 1980s, including "On My Radio", "Three Minute Hero", "Missing Words" and "The Whisper". Rolling Stone said of Black "Hands down, Pauline Black possessed the best voice that ever graced a 2-Tone release. Blessed with a bewitching soprano and dramatic panache, Black's voice reached plateaus that made every other musical detail sound like part of a backdrop painted just to set the stage for her entrance." Black has also been an actress, with roles in films and television.

== Early life ==
Belinda Magnus was born on 23 October 1953, in Romford, Essex, England, to an Anglo-Jewish teenage mother and Nigerian father. She was adopted by a white middle-aged couple and given the name Pauline Vickers. Her biological father, Gordon Adenle, had come to London from Nigeria to study engineering and was a Yoruba omoba (or prince). Black was unaware of her Jewish heritage until the age of 42 when she traced her birth mother. Black studied science at Lanchester Polytechnic (now Coventry University) in the early 1970s before training as a radiographer in Coventry. Upon completion of her studies she worked for the NHS for five years before she entered the music industry.

== Music career ==
Black was a founding member of two-tone ska band The Selecter who were formed in Coventry in 1979. The Selecter, along with the Specials and Madness, are credited with starting the ska revival movement. She adopted a stage name in order to conceal her involvement in the band from her employer, choosing the surname Black partly in reaction to her upbringing - her adoptive family had always referred to her as "coloured" rather than black.

The Selecter split up in 1982 but have sporadically reformed since 1991.

In 2001 Black, with Jean-Jacques Burnel (The Stranglers), Jake Burns (Stiff Little Fingers) and Nicky Welsh (The Selecter & Bad Manners) formed and toured as 3 Men & Black, doing acoustic versions of songs they are famous for, and talking a little about how they came to write the songs etc. The band continued with a line-up of Black and three male artists, which varied according to availability as the artists also continued with their separate careers, and has also included Bruce Foxton (The Jam & SLF), Eric Faulkner (Bay City Rollers) and Dave Wakeling (The Beat). An album, 3 Men + Black, Acoustic, featuring Black, Burnel, Burns, Foxton & Welsh was released in 2004.

Another revival of Selecter took place in 2010 with Black and Arthur 'Gaps' Hendrickson from the original band once again playing together under The Selecter name to celebrate the 30th anniversary of their debut album, Too Much Pressure.

In 2014, a portrait of Black was exhibited as part of the Return of the Rudeboy exhibition by Dean Chalkley and Harris Elliott at Somerset House, London.

Black has also performed with Gorillaz on their Humanz tour.

She was appointed Officer of the Order of the British Empire (OBE) in the 2022 New Year Honours for services to entertainment. She was appointed as a Deputy Lieutenant of the West Midlands in May 2022.

== Television and acting career ==
After the Selecter had split up, Black was co-host, with Bob Carolgees and Spit the Dog, of the children's television quiz show, Hold Tight. She developed an acting career in television and theatre, appearing in dramas such as The Vice, The Bill, Hearts and Minds and Two Thousand Acres of Sky. Black appeared in the soap opera Hollyoaks for four episodes as Diane Valentine, until her character was killed off. She won the 1991 Time Out award for Best Actress for her portrayal of Billie Holiday in the play All or Nothing at All. She also starred alongside Christopher Lee in the horror film Funny Man. In 2010, she appeared in a series 24 episode of Never Mind the Buzzcocks, presented by Robert Webb, in the Identity Parade round.

== Radio career ==
In 2007, Black narrated the BBC Four documentary Soul Britannia, which chronicles the history of British soul music. She later appeared in the follow-up Reggae Britannia as an interviewee, and as a member of the Selecter.

== Book writing career ==
In 2011, Black released her autobiography, Black by Design.
