= The Selecter =

British two-tone ska band

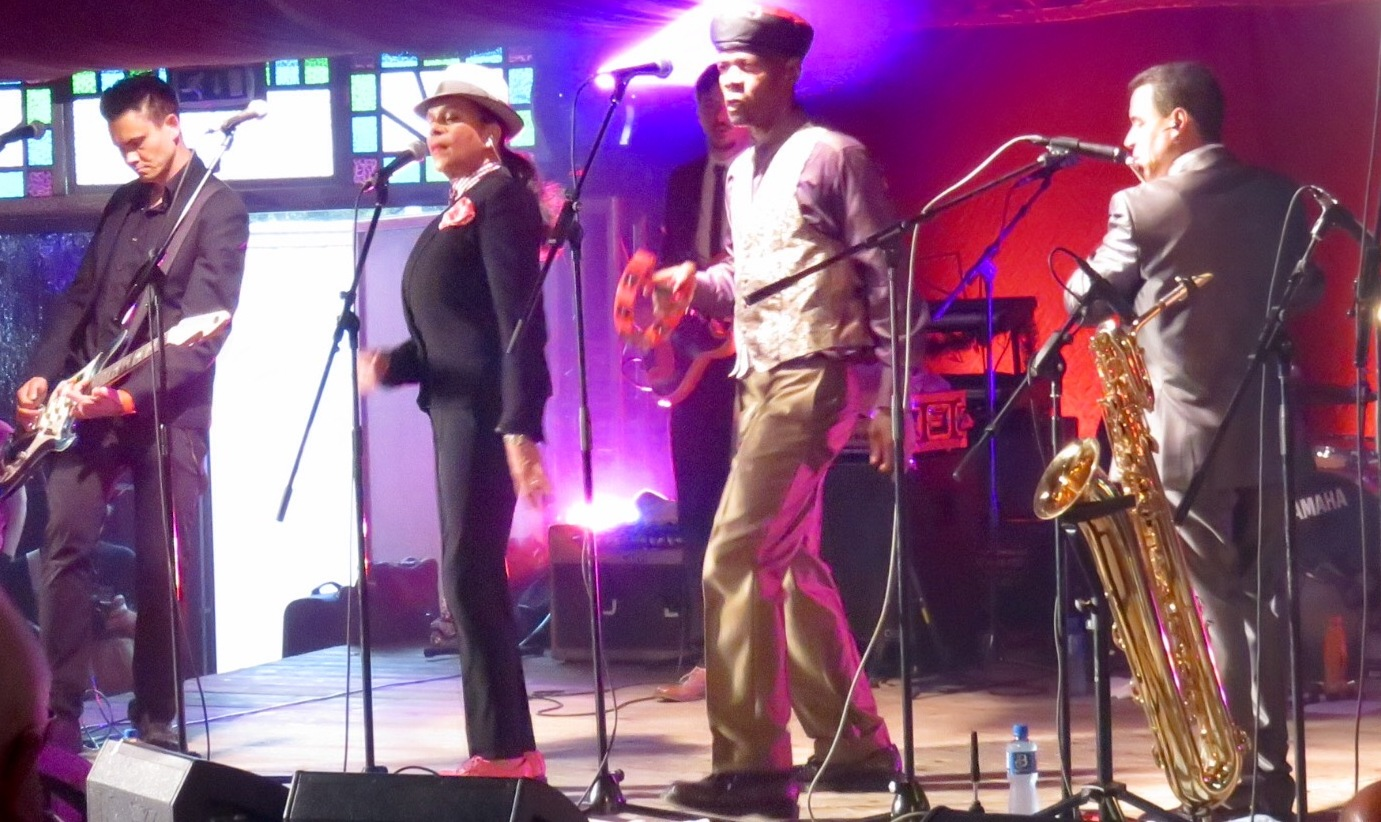
- The Selecter performing live at the Milton Keynes International Festival in Milton Keynes, 2016. Vocalists Pauline Black (second from left) and Arthur 'Gaps' Hendrickson (third from left) are original members.

Background information
- Origin: Coventry, England
- Genres: Ska; two-tone; new wave
- Years active: 1979–1982; 1991–2006; 2010–present
- Labels: 2 Tone; Chrysalis
- Members: Pauline Black; Charley 'Aitch' Bembridge; John Robertson; Andrew Pearson; Lee Horsley; Neil Pyzer
- Past members: Former members
- Website: Pauline Black's Selecter; Neol Davies' Selecter

The Selecter is an English 2 tone ska revival band, formed in Coventry, England, in 1979.

The Selecter featured a diverse line-up, both in terms of race and gender, initially consisting of Arthur 'Gaps' Hendrickson and Pauline Black on lead vocals, Neol Davies and Compton Amanor on guitar, Desmond Brown on Hammond organ, Charley 'Aitch' Bembridge on drums, and Charley Anderson on bass. The band's name comes from the original "The Selecter" track, which appeared on the flip side of The Special AKA's "Gangsters" single in 1979, and was written by Neol Davies and John Bradbury, produced by Roger Lomas and featured Barry Jones on trombone.

The band were one of the most successful ska bands of the 2 tone era, notching up several top forty singles on the UK Singles Chart. Having co-released the first 2 tone ska single with the Specials, they were one of the founding acts of the movement. Though influential, the original lineup only remained together for a year, and even with replacement players the band continued until breaking up in 1981.

The Selecter reformed in 1991 with original members Neol Davies and Pauline Black, along with Bad Manners members Martin Stewart, Nick Welsh and Perry Melius. Davies left the band in 1993, but lead vocalist Black continued to perform and release music under the Selecter name until 2006.

By 2011, another version of the band featuring Neol Davies was touring separately. In June 2011, Black applied for, and won, the Selecter trademark and the right to use the name herself. The reformed, Pauline Black-led line-up still tours and releases albums under the Selecter name, most recently releasing Human Algebra, the band's 16th studio album, in 2022.

== History ==
In 1977, Neol Davies and John Bradbury (who later became a member of the Specials), with the trombone player Barry Jones, recorded a track in a recording session in 1977–78 that resulted in "Kingston Affair", which was produced by Coventry producer Roger Lomas. It was initially credited to 'The Selecters' and although the record was touted around the industry, there were no takers and it remained on the shelf until 1979, when it was released as "The Selecter" as a double a-side with the Special AKA's recording "Gangsters", the first 2 Tone Records single. It was released in March 1979, reaching No. 6 in the UK Singles Chart. The track was written by Davies and Bradbury.

After the success of the single, Davies put a band together to capitalise on the success of the single. He had recently been playing in Transposed Men with keyboard player Desmond Brown and Brown joined the band, along with bass player Charley Anderson, guitarist Compton Amanor, drummer Aitch Bembridge and vocalist Gaps Hendrickson. All the musicians had played on the local scene in Coventry for a number of years with bands such as The Ray King Soul Band, Hard Top 22 and others. The seven piece line-up for the original band was completed when Pauline Black was spotted by Davies. Davies offered Pauline an audition with the Selecter – she joined along with other members in July 1979.

The new band released the singles "On My Radio", "Three Minute Hero" and "Missing Words", written by Davies. The Selecter's debut studio album, Too Much Pressure, was recorded at the end of 1979 and beginning of the new year, and was released in February 1980 by 2 Tone Records and Chrysalis Records. Anderson and Brown left the Selecter in 1980 to form the People. Their replacements were James Mackie and Adam Williams. Their second studio album, Celebrate the Bullet was released in February 1981 and the title track had a music video that aired on MTV's first day of broadcast, before Black left the band to pursue a solo career. A short time after, unsuccessfully having tried Stan Campbell as the singer, the rest of the members disbanded. The Selecter were featured in the 2 Tone film documentary and on the live compilation album Dance Craze (1981).

== Post break-up years ==
=== Pauline Black ===
Black left the band in 1981 to pursue a solo career. That solo career was ultimately short-lived and Black pursued a career in theatre, television and film.

From 1991 she led a reformed Selecter for 15 years releasing several new albums. In 2006 she took a sabbatical from the Selecter, to write her memoirs Black by Design for publishing house Serpent's Tail. In 2009, she returned to the live arena, playing shows in the UK, Germany and South America guesting with various ska musicians and performing songs from the Selecter's first two studio albums. During her sabbatical, Black recorded a new 13-track solo album, Pigment of My Imagination, though it remains unreleased. She later reformed the Selecter, this time with guest original lead singer Arthur "Gaps" Hendrickson, and in 2010 they played two shows at the Sinner's Day Festival at the Ethias Arena in Hasselt, Belgium, and at the Bloomsbury Ballroom in London.

=== Neol Davies ===
Neol Davies penned all of the Selecter's hit singles. He started up his own home studio after the band disbanded in 1981 to write and record his own new songs, and he played a number of local shows in the Midlands while teaching guitar in local schools. Davies formed a new version of the Selecter in 1991 with Black, before he left the band two years later. He started up a new outfit called Selecter Instrumental, mostly playing movie tunes in a ska style. In the early 1990s, he joined a reunited Specials in the studio, contributing rhythm guitar to sessions that would later be released as the cover albums Skinhead Girl (2000) and Conquering Ruler (2001). In 1998, he released his debut solo studio album Box of Blues, assisted by bass player Horace Panter of the Specials and drummer Anthony Harty, and the trio often performed at a number of blues concerts in the UK. He later recorded another solo studio album, Future Swamp (2002), with guests including Ronnie Wood of the Rolling Stones and Reef members Dominic Greensmith and Jason Knight. Both albums were released on Davies' own label, VoMatic Records. He later led his own version of The Selecter from 2010 to 2012 and occasionally guested on stage with The Neville Staple Band between 2019 and 2021.

=== Charley Anderson ===
Charley Anderson moved to Sweden during the 1990s where he performed, recorded and released material with the Skalatones. In 2009, Anderson returned to Coventry to play a charity concert at the Central Hall to promote his Ghetto Child project. Joining him on stage were guests from UB40, the Specials, the Selecter along with saxophonist Carlos Garnett.

=== Aitch Bembridge ===
Charley 'Aitch' Bembridge has been involved with the All Skas, a ska band which performed in the Midlands. He also served as drummer in the Specials through their first reunion, both live and in the studio, from 1993 through to 1998. He re-joined Black and Hendrickson's version of the band in 2021.

=== Gaps Hendrickson ===
Hendrickson later re-joined The Selecter in 1994, remaining until 1996. He occasionally performed on stage with local Coventry bands, including Special Brew and also worked as a security guard in the city. Hendrickson died at his home in Coventry from a brief illness on 11 June 2024 at the age of 73, after having been diagnosed with cancer the prior year.

=== 30th Anniversary of 2 Tone celebrations ===
Davies, Hendrickson, Anderson and Black were also involved with unveiling commemorative plaques for the 30th anniversary of 2 Tone on significant buildings associated with the record label in Coventry.

== Reunions ==
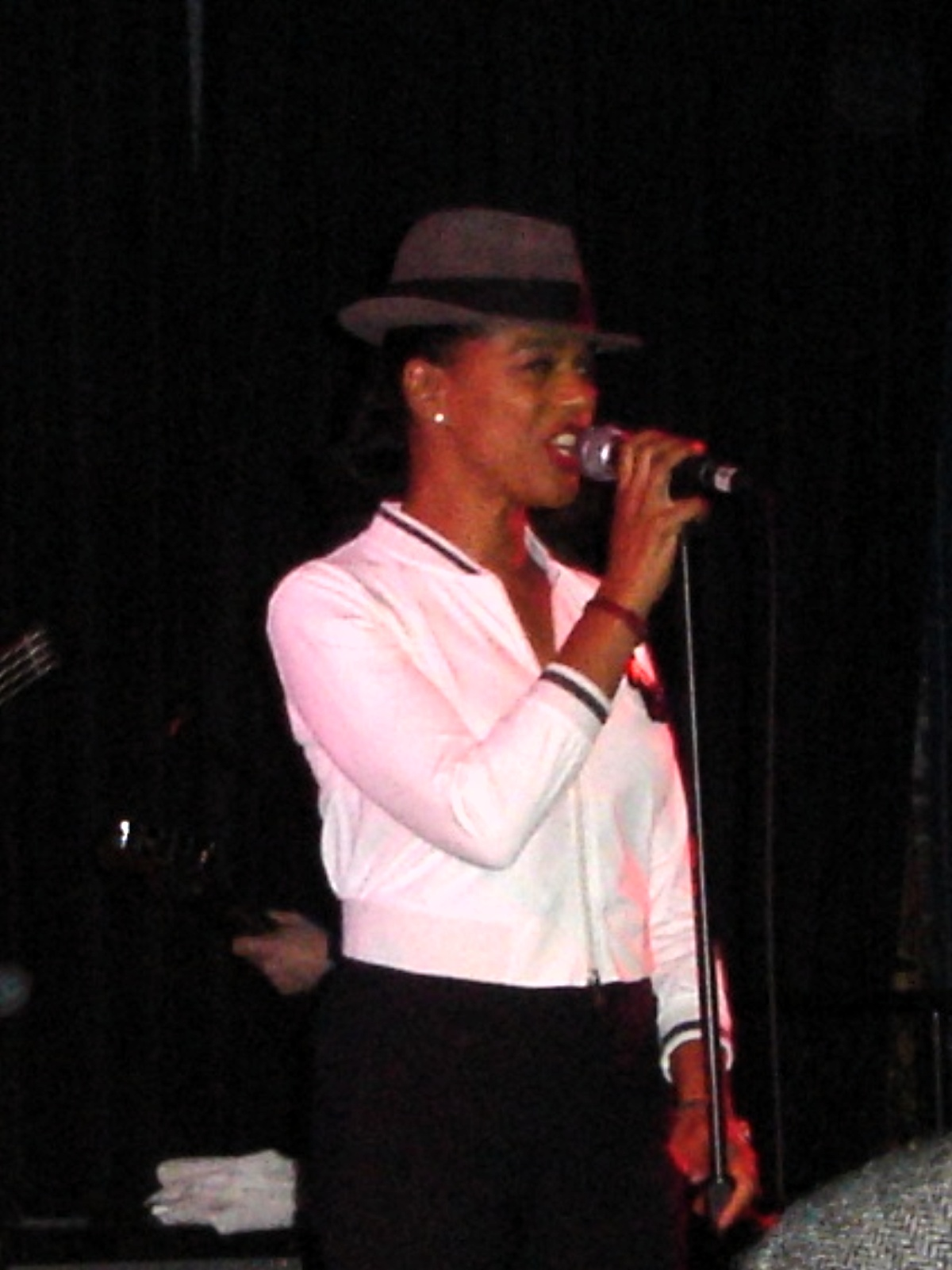
Black performing live with the Selecter in San Francisco, 2005

Davies and Black reunited towards the end of the 1980s, performing as a duo, with Davies on electric guitar and Black on vocals. The pair featured on an episode of a Jools Holland music show that was broadcast on European satellite television. Then, in 1990, after two guest spots with Bad Manners, and being genuinely surprised by the reception they received, Black and Davies reformed the Selecter with three members of Bad Manners, Martin Stewart, Nick Welsh and Perry Melius, in 1991.

After releasing a new version of On My Radio, backed up with a new version of The Selecter and performing some tours, Davies departed the band in 1993. From 1994 to 1996, another original member, Arthur 'Gaps' Hendrickson, performed with this line-up occasionally. They released several new albums, toured around the world and toured with No Doubt in 1997 in the US. 1998's politically-focused Cruel Britannia was critically acclaimed. Black continued to record and perform as the Selecter up until 2006, and from 2010 to the present.

On 31 October 2010, Pauline Black and Arthur 'Gaps' Hendrickson played under the Selecter name to celebrate the 30th anniversary of the seminal debut studio album, Too Much Pressure (1980), by performing the whole album live at the Sinners Day Festival, Ethias Stadium, Hasselt, Belgium. They also performed at the Bloomsbury Ballroom, London, in November 2010. In her capacity as lead singer of the Selecter, Black featured prominently in BBC Four's Reggae Britannia series in February 2011 and the televised 'Reggae Britannia Concert' at the Barbican, London, alongside Ken Boothe, Neville Staple and Brinsley Forde of Aswad.

The Selecter reunited once again when the band travelled over to Belfast, Northern Ireland, to play a show in the capital's annual Cathedral Quarter Arts Festival. This was followed by an extensive tour of the UK, Europe, and in October 2014, New Zealand and Australia.

In June 2015, the band released Subculture mixed by Mike "Prince Fatty" Pelanconi on DMF Records. They toured the UK in 2015 and Black and Hendrickson were special guests on a number of dates with Jools Holland's Rhythm and Blues Orchestra including at London's Royal Albert Hall in November.

In October 2017, the band released a new studio album Daylight.

In 2022, The Selecter were due to tour the UK performing their second studio album Celebrate the Bullet (1981) in its entirety. However, the tour was postponed until 2023 and only select tracks from that album ended up being performed.

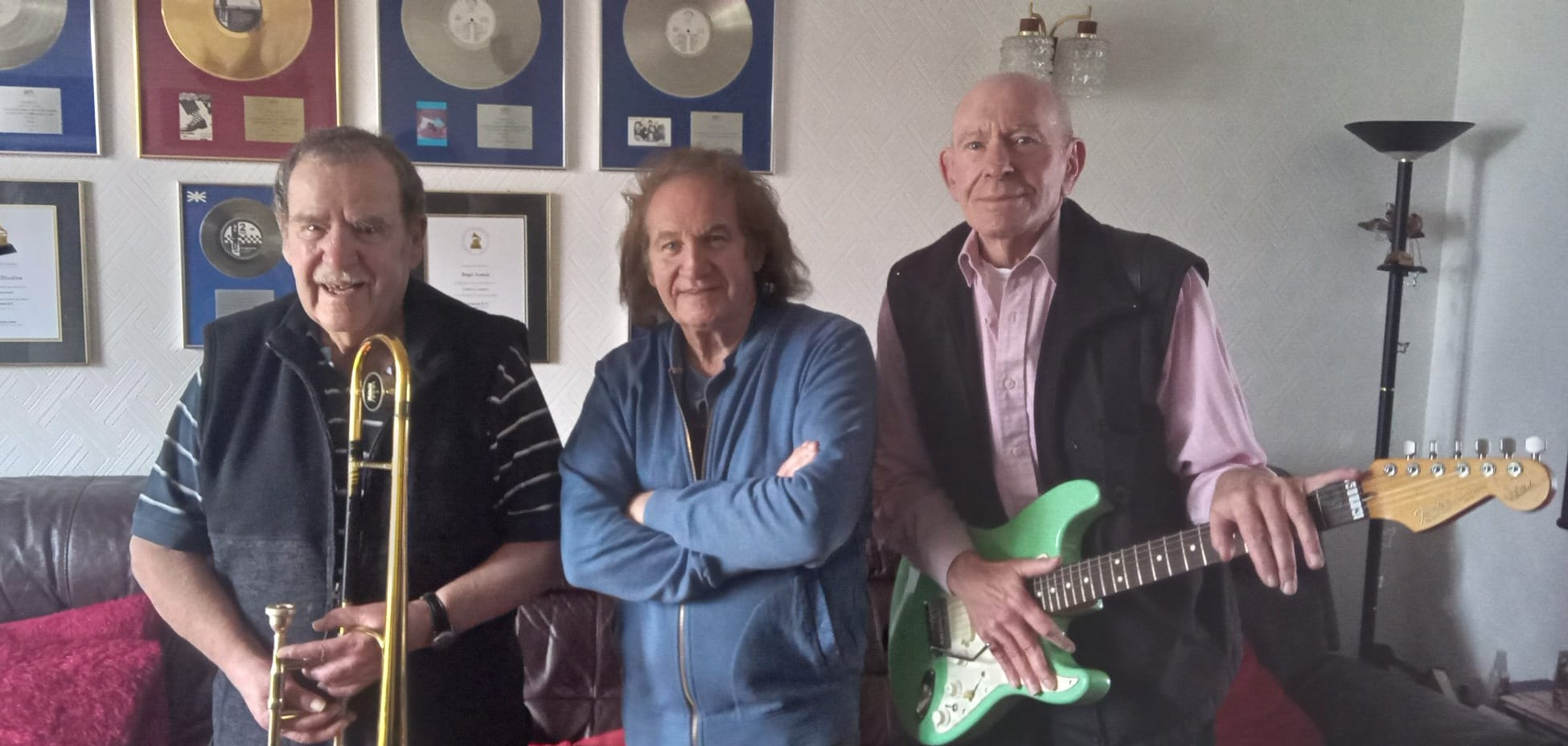
Barry Jones, Roger Lomas and Neol Davies reunited in Coventry, 2023

After a 2022 interview with 89-year-old Barry Jones appeared in the 2 Tone - Before, During & After fanzine, Davies contacted Jones and, in May 2023, Davies, Jones and Lomas, the surviving musicians and producer to have been involved with the original "Kingston Affair" track, reunited in Coventry.

The trio initially met up at Lomas' house and then made an appearance at The 2 Tone Village in the city. An in-depth article on the reunion was featured in the June 2023 edition of the fanzine, where Jones credited the fanzine with setting the whole thing in motion and also for giving him "a new lease of life".

== Style ==
=== Music ===
The Selecter were "one of the key bands" of 2 tone music, the late 1970s and early 1980s genre that mixed ska with the energy of punk rock. The band's debut album, Too Much Pressure (1980), exemplifies the band's 2 Tone sound, mixing ska, reggae and punk rock styles. Adding influences from new wave music, the record's follow-up Celebrate the Bullet (1981) was broodier than its predecessor, featuring a less intense, slower sound. After reuniting in the 1990s, the band's third studio album The Happy Album (1994) saw a stylistic deviation; while keeping ska as its base, the record explored contemporary rhythms and influences from genres such as hip-hop and flourishes of orchestral music, incorporating sampling while occasionally slowing down to a reggae tempo. One critic said the record is "roughly parallel for the memory of 2- Tone what Big Audio Dynamite did for punk."

The band scaled back somewhat with its follow-up album Pucker! in 1995, which displayed a new blend of ska with elements from new wave and power pop, as well as other atypical touches such as, on one song, pedal steel guitar. Cruel Britainnia, the band's fifth studio album from 1998, was heralded as a return to the band's 2 tone sound, and The Trojan Songbook series of cover albums from the turn of the century were predominately in a reggae style. The band also recorded several acoustic albums, namely Unplugged for the Rude Boy Generation (2002) and Requiem for a Black Soul (2004), which brought "ska into the fashionable acoustic field." When the band reunited in the 2010s, they used ska and reggae rhythms on Made in Britain (2011) and its follow-up String Theory (2013).

=== Lyrics ===
The band were among the few racially and sexually mixed 2 tone bands and Black's lyrics, in a similar vein to several other 2 tone bands, covered numerous social ills, including sexism and most prominently racism. While Too Much Pressure (1980) featured politically conscious lyrics, Celebrate the Bullet (1981) was darker and tenser, likewise featuring racial and social issues as themes while also concerning itself with "cold war paranoia and fear for the future." The Happy Album (1994) was similarly "burdened by a social conscience," whereas the lyrics on Pucker! (1995) were generally more uncharacteristically sunny and lightweight. With Made in Britain in 2011, the band "wanted to have a conversation basically about where The Selecter was at, where we were at in relation to 2 Tone." The record largely addressed the advent of multiculturalism and the legacy of 2 tone's equality message in the 21st century. For String Theory (2013), the band extended from these themes, observing how people "celebrate their differences more than they celebrate the things that unite us," and named the album in relation to the string theory being a metaphor for connection between humans.

== Members ==
=== Pauline Black's Selecter (2010–present) ===
- Pauline Black – vocals (1979–1982, 1991–1993, 2010–present)
- Charley 'Aitch' Bembridge – drums (1979–1982, 2021–present)
- Lee Horsley – keyboards (2014–present)
- Neil Pyzer-Skeete – horns (2010–present)
- John Robertson – guitar (2019–present)
- Andrew Pearson – bass guitar (2019–present)

=== Neol Davies' Selecter (2011–2012) ===
- Neol Davies – lead vocals and guitar (1979–1982, 1991–2006, 2011–present)
- John Gibbons – lead vocals (2011–present)
- Daniel Crosby – drums (2011–present)
- Dean Ross – Hammond organ (2011–present)
- Andre Bayuni – bass (2011–present)
- Tim Cansfield – guitar (2011–present)
- Victor Trivino – percussion (2011–present)
- Ellie Smith – horns (2011–present)
- Hannah Taylor – horns (2011–present)
- Faye Treacy – horns (2011–present)

=== Former members ===
- Arthur 'Gaps' Hendrickson – vocals (1979–1982, 1991–2006, 2010–2024, died 2024)
- Crompton Amanor – lead guitar (1979–1982)
- Charley Anderson – bass guitar (1979–1980)
- Desmond Brown – Hammond organ (1979–1980)
- James Mackie – Hammond organ and saxophone (1980–1982)
- Adam Williams – bass guitar (1980–1982)
- Martin Stewart – keyboards (1991–2006)
- Nicky Welsh – bass (1991–2006)
- Perry Melius – drums (1991–2006)
- Emma Bassett – Horns (2011)
- Toby Barelli – guitar (2001–2004)
- Anthony Harty – guitar (2010–2014)
- John Thompson – bass guitar (2010–2014)
- Greg Coulson – keyboard (2010–2014)
- Orlando LaRose – horns (2010–2019)
- Winston Marche – drums (2010–2021)
- Will Crewdson – guitar (2014–2019)
- Luke Palmer – bass guitar (2014–2019)

== Discography ==
- Too Much Pressure (1980)
- Celebrate the Bullet (1981)
- The Happy Album (1994)
- Pucker! (1995)
- Cruel Britannia (1999)
- The Trojan Songbook (1999)
- Kingston Affair (2000)
- The Trojan Songbook – Volume 2 (2000)
- The Trojan Songbook – Volume 3 (2001)
- Acoustic – Unplugged for the Rude Boy Generation (2002)
- Real to Reel (2003)
- Acoustic – Requiem for a Black Soul (2004)
- Made in Britain (2011)
- String Theory (2013)
- Subculture (2015)
- Daylight (2017)
- Human Algebra (2023)
