= 1980 in music =

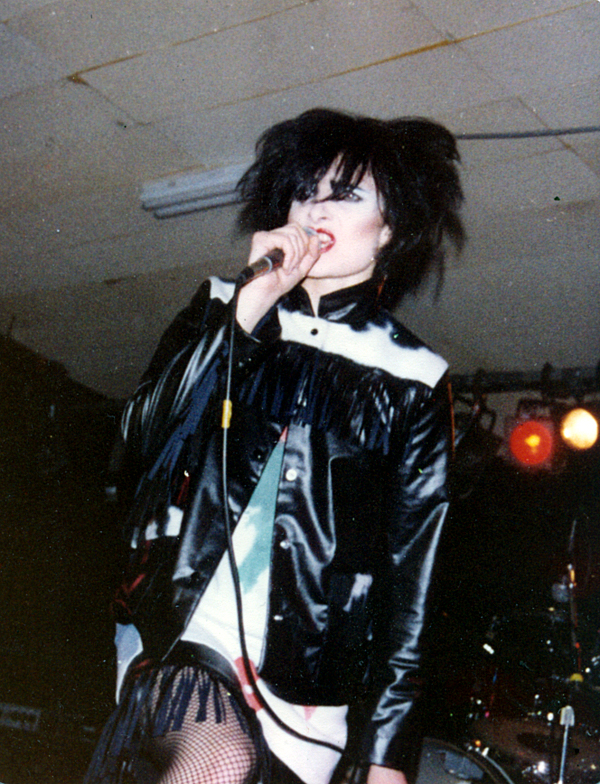
Alternative rock singer Siouxsie Sioux in 1980

This is a list of notable events in music that took place in the year 1980.

== Specific locations ==
- 1980 in British music
- 1980 in Japanese music
- 1980 in Norwegian music
- 1980 in Scandinavian music

== Specific genres ==
- 1980 in country music
- 1980 in heavy metal music
- 1980 in hip-hop music
- 1980 in jazz
- 1980 in progressive rock

== Events ==
=== January–March ===
- January 1
  - Cliff Richard is appointed an MBE by Queen Elizabeth II of the United Kingdom.
- January 5 – Donna Summer's third double album in a 14-month period, On the Radio: Greatest Hits Volumes I & II, released on 15 October 1979, reaches the top spot on the Billboard Albums charts.
- January 7 – At the age of 44, songwriter Larry Williams is found dead in his Los Angeles, California, home of a gunshot wound to the head. Investigators are never able to determine whether his death was a murder or suicide.
- January 13 – The Beach Boys, Grateful Dead, and Jefferson Starship perform at a benefit concert at Oakland Coliseum for the people of Kampuchea.
- January 14 – Rush release Permanent Waves, which eventually becomes the band's fifth platinum album.
- January 16 – Paul McCartney is arrested in Tokyo for possession of a half pound of marijuana. The remaining part of McCartney's and Wings' tour was subsequently canceled.
- January 19 – The first UK Indie Chart is published in Record Week, with Spizzenergi's "Where's Captain Kirk" topping the singles chart, and Adam and the Ants' Dirk Wears White Sox topping the album chart.
- January 25 – Paul McCartney is released from jail in Japan and ejected from the country by Japanese authorities.
- February 7 – Pink Floyd's The Wall Tour opens at the Los Angeles Memorial Sports Arena.
- February 19 – Bon Scott, lead singer of AC/DC, dies in London. Although common folklore cites pulmonary aspiration of vomit as the cause of his death, the official cause is listed as "Acute alcohol poisoning" and "Death by Misadventure".
- February 27 – The 22nd Annual Grammy Awards are presented in Los Angeles, hosted by Kenny Rogers. Billy Joel's 52nd Street wins Album of the Year, while the Doobie Brothers' "What a Fool Believes" wins both Record of the Year and Song of the Year. Rickie Lee Jones wins Best New Artist.
- February 29 – Buddy Holly's trademark glasses and the Big Bopper's wristwatch are "rediscovered" in old police files by the Mason City, Iowa, sheriff (both were killed in a plane crash on February 3, 1959, along with singer Ritchie Valens).
- March 3
  - Sotheby's auction house in London auctions off a Rivera Hotel, Las Vegas, napkin signed by Elvis Presley for £500. Other items auctioned included four American dollar bills autographed by the Beatles, for £220 and a collection of personal letters belonging to the Rolling Stones, also for £220.
  - Randy Jackson of The Jacksons is severely injured in a near-fatal car crash in Hollywood, California. The accident completely crushes his legs, forcing the group to cancel and alter their promotion schedule for the upcoming Triumph album and delaying live performances until his recovery.
- March 8–16 – Tbilisi Rock Festival (1980): the first state-sanctioned rock music festival in the Soviet Union.
- March 14 – Record producer Quincy Jones receives a star on the Hollywood Walk of Fame.
- March 19 – Elvis Presley's autopsy was subpoenaed during the trial of Dr. George Nichopoulous, who would later be found guilty of over-prescribing drugs to Presley, Jerry Lee Lewis and other clients.
- March 20 – Radio Caroline shuts down in the UK after radio ship Mi Amigo sinks in a storm.

=== April–June ===
- April 1 – Brian Johnson is made the new lead singer of AC/DC replacing the late Bon Scott.
- April 5 – R.E.M. lead vocalist Michael Stipe, guitarist Peter Buck, drummer Bill Berry and bassist Mike Mills played their first show.
- April 13 – The musical Grease ends its Broadway run of 3,388 performances, making it the longest running show on Broadway up until that time.
- April 17 – As the "official guests of State", Bob Marley and the Wailers perform at Zimbabwe's Independence festival. Marley calls the event the "greatest honor of my life."
- April 19
  - Johnny Logan wins the 25th Eurovision Song Contest for Ireland, with the song "What's Another Year".
  - R.E.M. perform for the first time under this name.
- April 25 – Black Sabbath release Heaven and Hell, their first album to feature Ronnie James Dio on vocals.
- April 30 – The Roger Daltrey film, McVicar, opens in London.
- May 4 – America's Top 10, the television version of radio's American Top 40 and hosted by Casey Kasem, debuts this week in syndication.
- June 25
  - Rock and Roll pioneer Bill Haley performs for the last time during a tour of South Africa, before deteriorating health ends his performing career. July 1980 marks the 25th anniversary of Haley's "Rock Around the Clock" reaching No. 1 on the American singles charts.
  - The Sony Walkman goes on sale in the United States.
  - Kiss plays its first show with new drummer Eric Carr at the New York Palladium.
- June 27 – John Lydon and Keith Levene of Public Image Ltd make an appearance on The Tomorrow Show with host Tom Snyder. In a famously uncomfortable interview, Lydon gives curt and vague responses to most of Snyder's questions.

=== July–September ===
- July 11 – Ultravox release their fourth studio album, Vienna. Their first album with new lead singer Midge Ure following the departures of frontman John Foxx and guitarist Robin Simon, Vienna marks a radical shift in Ultravox's direction and image, transforming the former post-punk band into a more sophisticatedly-oriented new wave/synthpop group. Despite this stylistic shift alienating fans and critics who were more favorable towards the Foxx-led incarnation of the band, Vienna would go on to become Ultravox's most successful studio album to date.
- July 18 – The documentary and concert film No Nukes opens in New York.
- July 25 – Over five months after the death of lead singer Bon Scott, AC/DC release Back in Black, their first album with replacement singer Brian Johnson, who would remain with the band until 2016. The album's success would lead it to become the second-highest-selling album of all time and the highest-selling studio album by any band to date.
- July 29 – Over two months after the suicide of lead singer Ian Curtis, the surviving members of Joy Division regroup as New Order and debut anonymously live at Manchester's Beach Club; the group would adopt the moniker "New Order" the following year.
- July 31 – The Eagles end their tour with a contentious show, beginning a split that would last 14 years.
- August 4 – John Lennon and Yoko Ono begin the recording of the Double Fantasy album.
- August 16
  - The first Monsters of Rock heavy metal festival is held at Donington Park in England. Rainbow headlines, and Judas Priest, Scorpions, April Wine, Saxon, Riot and Touch also perform.
  - Several bands lose members in one day; bass player Jah Wobble leaves Public Image, Ltd.; keyboard player Jools Holland leaves Squeeze; and drummers Bill Ward and Cozy Powell leave Black Sabbath and Rainbow respectively.
- August 19 – Fans at Exhibition Stadium in Toronto stage a riot after Alice Cooper cancels because of illness.
- August 23 – The Heatwave festival near Toronto features The B-52's, Talking Heads, The Pretenders, Elvis Costello and many others.
- August 25 – The last performance of the Jahrhundertring at the Bayreuth Festival receives ovations of 45 minutes.
- August 26 – Pete Comita replaces Tom Petersson in Cheap Trick.
- August 31 – Karen Carpenter marries Thomas Burris. "Because We Are in Love" is played at their wedding.
- September 3 – The Jacksons are honored with a star on the Hollywood Walk of Fame.
- September 13
  - Solid Gold, a new music television series, premieres in syndication.
  - Elton John plays a free concert for 400,000 people in New York's Central Park. He performs the encore in a Donald Duck costume.
  - Gary Numan earns his third consecutive number 1 on the UK Albums Chart in less than fourteen months as Telekon enters the chart at number 1.
- September 25 – John Bonham, drummer of Led Zeppelin, is found dead by bandmate John Paul Jones.

=== October–December ===
- October 9 – A riot breaks out at a Black Sabbath concert in Milwaukee after bassist Geezer Butler is hit in the head by a bottle and the band quits the stage.
- October 26 – Paul Kantner of Jefferson Starship is rushed to hospital following a cerebral hemorrhage. He soon recovers without surgery, defying medical odds.
- October – Iron Maiden replaces guitarist Dennis Stratton with Urchin guitarist Adrian Smith.
- November 15 – The 9th OTI Festival, held at the Teatro General San Martín in Buenos Aires, Argentina, is won by the song "Contigo mujer", written by Ednita Nazario and Laureano Brizuela, and performed by Rafael José representing Puerto Rico.
- November 21
  - Iron Maiden play their first gig with new guitarist Adrian Smith in Uxbridge, London, England.
- December 4 – Led Zeppelin disbands following the death of drummer John Bonham.
- December 5 – Duran Duran signs with EMI after finalizing its lineup and touring as a support act for Hazel O'Connor.
- December 7 – Darby Crash, leader of L.A. punk band the Germs, dies of a heroin overdose in a suicide pact.
- December 8 – John Lennon is shot to death outside his apartment building in New York City. Lennon's single, "(Just Like) Starting Over", subsequently becomes a number one hit in many countries, including the United States, United Kingdom and Australia.
- December 14 – Over 100,000 mourners attend a public vigil for John Lennon in Central Park, New York.
- December 31 – The ninth annual New Year's Rockin' Eve special airs on ABC, with appearances by The Charlie Daniels Band, Billy Preston, Syreeta, Chuck Berry and Barry Manilow.

=== Also in 1980 ===
- The Roland Corporation releases the Roland TR-808 drum machine, which became a cornerstone of the emerging electronic, dance, and hip hop genres. The machine went on to become one of the most influential instruments in popular music, comparable to the Fender Stratocaster's influence on rock.
- Record labels established in 1980
- Record labels disestablished in 1980
- The single "Groovy Ghost Show" by Casper is one of the first recorded hip hop songs from Chicago.
- British comedy group The Hee Bee Gee Bees release "Meaningless Songs (in Very High Voices)", a parody of a Bee Gees' disco-style single.
- Phil Collins signs a contract with Atlantic Records to distribute his solo records in the US and in Europe outside the UK (on WEA label).
- Seiji Ozawa is appointed to the position of Honorary Artistic Director of the Japan Philharmonic Orchestra.

== Bands formed ==
- See Category:Musical groups established in 1980

== Bands disbanded ==
- See Category:Musical groups disestablished in 1980

== Albums released ==
=== January ===
Day	Album	Artist	Notes
4	The Romantics	The Romantics	
8	Union Jacks	The Babys	
10	The Age of Plastic	The Buggles	Australia; UK release on 4 February
11	Pretenders	The Pretenders	
14	Permanent Waves	Rush	
18	Just Testing	Wishbone Ash	
18	Metamatic	John Foxx	Debut
21	True Colours	Split Enz	New Zealand
28	Love Stinks	The J. Geils Band	
28	Terminal Jive	Sparks	
30	Air Pocket	Roger Powell	
?	God Save the Queen/Under Heavy Manners	Robert Fripp	
?	No Place to Run	UFO	
?	Malice in Wonderland	Nazareth	
?	Is This Real?	Wipers	
?	The Return of the Durutti Column	The Durutti Column	
?	Sheer Greed	Girl	
?	Short Stories	Jon and Vangelis	
?	Sit Down and Talk to Me	Lou Rawls	
?	Un Peu de l'Âme des Bandits	Aksak Maboul	

=== February ===
Day	Album	Artist	Notes
4	End of the Century	Ramones	
5	Boys Don't Cry	The Cure	Compilation
7	Sugarhill Gang	The Sugarhill Gang	
12	Bryan Adams	Bryan Adams	
14	Bebe le Strange	Heart	
14	Lady T	Teena Marie	
15	Bad Luck Streak in Dancing School	Warren Zevon	
15	...But the Little Girls Understand	The Knack	
15	Earth & Sky	Graham Nash	
15	Get Happy!!	Elvis Costello	
15	Metal for Muthas	Various Artists	
15	Protect The Innocent	Rachel Sweet	
15	Too Much Pressure	The Selecter	
22	Orchestral Manoeuvres in the Dark	Orchestral Manoeuvres in the Dark	
22	Sheep Farming in Barnet	Toyah	Expanded reissue of 1979 EP
25	Against the Wind	Bob Seger & the Silver Bullet Band	
25	Warm Thoughts	Smokey Robinson	
27	Remorse Code	Desperate Bicycles	
29	Departure	Journey	
?	1980	Gil Scott Heron	
?	After Dark	Andy Gibb	
?	Argybargy	Squeeze	
?	Colossal Youth	Young Marble Giants	
?	Mad Love	Linda Ronstadt	
?	Martin Rev	Martin Rev	
?	Soldier	Iggy Pop	
?	Supercharged	Tavares	
?	Survivor	Survivor	
?	That's What You Get Babe	Kevin Ayers	
?	Willie Nile	Willie Nile	

=== March ===
Day	Album	Artist	Notes
3	Roberta Flack Featuring Donny Hathaway	Roberta Flack and Donny Hathaway	
3	Lost in Love	Air Supply	Australia
7	Coal Miner's Daughter	Various Artists	Soundtrack
7	Nobody's Heroes	Stiff Little Fingers	
7	The Psychedelic Furs	The Psychedelic Furs	
12	Glass Houses	Billy Joel	
14	On Through the Night	Def Leppard	Debut
14	Released	Patti LaBelle	
15	Half-Mute	Tuxedomoon	
17	Let's Get Serious	Jermaine Jackson	
18	Dreams	Grace Slick	
21	For How Much Longer Do We Tolerate Mass Murder?	The Pop Group	
24	Keepin' the Summer Alive	The Beach Boys	
24	Rarities	The Beatles	US Compilation
26	Naughty	Chaka Khan	
26	One Eighty	Ambrosia	
26	Women and Children First	Van Halen	
26	Welcome To The Club	Ian Hunter	
28	Cat in the Hat	Bobby Caldwell	
28	Duke	Genesis	
28	Look Hear?	10cc	
31	Animal Magnetism	Scorpions	
?	Conquest	Uriah Heep	
?	Progressions of Power	Triumph	
?	Sequel	Harry Chapin	
?	Feel the Heat	The Radiators	
?	Frantic City	Teenage Head	
?	Let the Music Do the Talking	The Joe Perry Project	
?	Sacred Songs	Daryl Hall	
?	Suddenly	The Sports	
?	Reaching For Tomorrow	Switch	
?	Somebody's Waiting	Anne Murray	

=== April ===
Day	Album	Artist	Notes
3	Wheels of Steel	Saxon	
3	The Magic of Boney M. – 20 Golden Hits	Boney M.	Compilation
3	The Barbara Dickson Album	Barbara Dickson	
4	Light Up the Night	Brothers Johnson	
11	Iron Maiden	Iron Maiden	Debut
11	British Steel	Judas Priest	
11	Snakes and Ladders	Gerry Rafferty	
11	The Unknown Soldier	Roy Harper	
14	Dolly, Dolly, Dolly	Dolly Parton	
16	Just One Night	Eric Clapton	Live
18	Heaven and Hell	Black Sabbath	
18	Seventeen Seconds	The Cure	
18	Solo in Soho	Phil Lynott	
18	Sky 2	Sky	
18	Holiday '80	The Human League	EP
18	Power	The Temptations	
21	Empty Glass	Pete Townshend	
21	Hypnotised	The Undertones	
24	Cameosis	Cameo	
26	Los Angeles	X	
28	Flush the Fashion	Alice Cooper	
28	Go to Heaven	Grateful Dead	
30	Roses in the Snow	Emmylou Harris	
?	The Golden Years	Motörhead	EP
?	The Boys Light Up	Australian Crawl	
?	Crash and Burn	Pat Travers Band	
?	Crazy Rhythms	The Feelies	In the US. 2/29/80 in UK
?	Give 'Em Hell	Witchfynde	
?	Growing Up in Public	Lou Reed	
?	Lookin' for Trouble	Toronto	
?	Marauder	Magnum	Live
?	Middle Man	Boz Scaggs	
?	Ska 'n' B	Bad Manners	
?	Strange Boutique	The Monochrome Set	
?	Tommy Tutone	Tommy Tutone	
?	Waters Edge	Sweet	

=== May ===
Day	Album	Artist	Notes
1	Tangram	Tangerine Dream	
5	Totale's Turns	The Fall	
9	Bass Culture	Linton Kwesi Johnson	
9	Warm Leatherette	Grace Jones	
16	McCartney II	Paul McCartney	
16	Freedom of Choice	Devo	
20	Unmasked	Kiss	
22	Diana	Diana Ross	
23	Ready an' Willing	Whitesnake	
23	Flesh and Blood	Roxy Music	
23	21 at 33	Elton John	
23	Travelogue	The Human League	
23	The Up Escalator	Graham Parker	
23	I Just Can't Stop It	The Beat	
28	Tight Shoes	Foghat	
30	Peter Gabriel	Peter Gabriel	Third Album
?	Can't Stop the Music	Village People	Soundtrack
?	The Correct Use of Soap	Magazine	
?	Bad Reputation	Joan Jett	Self-titled album released in 1980. Re-released as Bad Reputation in Jan 1981
?	New Clear Days	The Vapors	
?	Music Man	Waylon Jennings	
?	Quicksand Shoes	Streetheart	
?	Songs the Lord Taught Us	The Cramps	
?	Space Race	Mi-Sex	
?	Sportscar	Judie Tzuke	
?	Suicide: Alan Vega and Martin Rev	Suicide	
?	The Tale of the Tape	Billy Squier	
?	Three Mantras	Cabaret Voltaire	
?	Young and Restless	Prism	
?	Woman Love	Burton Cummings	

=== June ===
Day	Album	Artist	Notes
2	Found All the Parts	Cheap Trick	EP
2	I'm a Rebel	Accept	
2	Romance Dance	Kim Carnes	
4	East	Cold Chisel	
4	One for the Road	The Kinks	Live
6	The Blue Meaning	Toyah	
10	Uprising	Bob Marley & The Wailers	
13	Crashes	The Records	
13	Defector	Steve Hackett	
16	Come Upstairs	Carly Simon	
20	The Blues Brothers	Various Artists	Soundtrack
20	Rise Up	Peter Frampton	Brazil
23	Emotional Rescue	The Rolling Stones	
23	Saved	Bob Dylan	
24	Hold Out	Jackson Browne	
25	Huey Lewis and the News	Huey Lewis and the News	
27	Xanadu	Olivia Newton-John and ELO	Soundtrack
30	Demolition	Girlschool	Debut
30	The Game	Queen	
30	Metal Rendez-vous	Krokus	
30	Real People	Chic	
?	Live at Last	Black Sabbath	Live 1973
?	Danger Zone	Sammy Hagar	
?	Cultösaurus Erectus	Blue Öyster Cult	
?	Underwater Moonlight	The Soft Boys	
?	The Art of Walking	Pere Ubu	
?	Chipmunk Punk	The Chipmunks	
?	Breaking Silence	James Freud and the Radio Stars	
?	Dark Room	The Angels	
?	"The Dugites"	The Dugites	
?	Heroes	Commodores	
?	Endangered Species	Klaatu	
?	I've Got Something to Say	David Allan Coe	
?	Scream Dream	Ted Nugent	
?	Tomcattin'	Blackfoot	
?	Two Bit Monsters	John Hiatt	
?	Urban Cowboy	Various Artists	Soundtrack

=== July ===
Day	Album	Artist	Notes
1	John Anderson	John Anderson	
4	Deepest Purple: The Very Best of Deep Purple	Deep Purple	Compilation
4	There & Back	Jeff Beck	
11	Vienna	Ultravox	
11	Head On	Samson	
11	Searching for the Young Soul Rebels	Dexys Midnight Runners	
15	Back on the Streets	Donnie Iris	
16	Garden of Love	Rick James	
18	Closer	Joy Division	
18	Crocodiles	Echo & the Bunnymen	
18	Full Moon	Charlie Daniels Band	
18	Honeysuckle Rose	Willie Nelson	Soundtrack
18	Live Seventy Nine	Hawkwind	
18	No Night So Long	Dionne Warwick	
21	Chicago XIV	Chicago	
25	Back in Black	AC/DC	
25	TP	Teddy Pendergrass	
28	Zapp	Zapp	
29	Voices	Hall & Oates	
?	Rave On	Artful Dodger	
?	Wild Cat	Tygers of Pan Tang	
?	Espresso Bongo	Mental As Anything	
?	Hot on the One	James Brown	Live
?	Playing for Keeps	Eddie Money	
?	Anytime, Anyplace, Anywhere	Rossington Collins Band	
?	Sinsemilla	Black Uhuru	
?	The Voice of America	Cabaret Voltaire	
?	Seeds of Change	Kerry Livgren	

=== August ===
Day	Album	Artist	Notes
1	The Affectionate Punch	Associates	
1	Kaleidoscope	Siouxsie & the Banshees	
1	Special Things	The Pointer Sisters	
4	Porter & Dolly	Porter Wagoner and Dolly Parton	
4	What's the Word	The Fabulous Thunderbirds	
5	Crimes of Passion	Pat Benatar	
8	Glory Road	Gillan	
8	Give Me the Night	George Benson	
11	Love Lives Forever	Minnie Riperton	
12	One-Trick Pony	Paul Simon	
13	S.O.S.	The S.O.S. Band	
14	Give Love at Christmas	The Temptations	Christmas
15	Alibi	America	
15	Hats Off Step Lively	Jo Jo Zep & The Falcons	
15	Panorama	The Cars	
18	No More Dirty Deals	Johnny Van Zant	
20	24 Carrots	Al Stewart	
21	Black Rose	Cher	
22	Drama	Yes	
22	Living in a Fantasy	Leo Sayer	
27	Wild Planet	The B-52's	
29	The Michael Schenker Group	Michael Schenker Group	Debut
29	A	Jethro Tull	
29	Signing Off	UB40	
?	Common One	Van Morrison	
?	Doc at the Radar Station	Captain Beefheart	
?	Gamma 2	Gamma	
?	Jealous Again	Black Flag	EP
?	Loverboy	Loverboy	Debut
?	Neutronica	Donovan	
?	Off the Coast of Me	Kid Creole and the Coconuts	
?	Reach for the Sky	The Allman Brothers Band	
?	The Swing of Delight	Carlos Santana	
?	Toy Love	Toy Love	

=== September ===
Day	Album	Artist	Notes
1	Change of Address	The Shadows	
1	I'm No Hero	Cliff Richard	
1	Audio-Visions	Kansas	
1	Especially for You	Cilla Black	
2	Fresh Fruit for Rotting Vegetables	Dead Kennedys	
5	Telekon	Gary Numan	
5	Waiting for a Miracle	Comsat Angels	
8	Never for Ever	Kate Bush	
8	I Am What I Am	George Jones	
8	Out of Control	Peter Criss	
8	Times Square	Various Artists	Soundtrack
9	Heartattack and Vine	Tom Waits	
12	Blizzard of Ozz	Ozzy Osbourne	UK
12	Black Sea	XTC	
12	Empires and Dance	Simple Minds	
12	Hanx!	Stiff Little Fingers	
12	Scary Monsters (And Super Creeps)	David Bowie	
15	Nothin' Matters and What If It Did	John Cougar	
17	Oingo Boingo	Oingo Boingo	EP
17	One Step Closer	The Doobie Brothers	
19	The Absolute Game	Skids	
19	White Spirit	White Spirit	
19	More Specials	The Specials	
21	B-2 Unit	Ryuichi Sakamoto	-
23	Greatest Hits	Kenny Rogers	Compilation
23	Guilty	Barbra Streisand	
24	Deface the Music	Utopia	
25	Rita Lee	Rita Lee	
26	Paris	Supertramp	Live
26	Absolutely	Madness	
26	Clues	Robert Palmer	
26	Triumph	The Jacksons	
29	Carnaval	Spyro Gyra	
29	Celebrate!	Kool & the Gang	
29	Hotter than July	Stevie Wonder	
29	Kurtis Blow	Kurtis Blow	
30	Aretha	Aretha Franklin	
?	Andy Gibb's Greatest Hits	Andy Gibb	
?	Audio-Visions	Kansas	
?	Beatin' the Odds	Molly Hatchet	
?	Kenny Loggins Alive	Kenny Loggins	Live
?	Mr. Hands	Herbie Hancock	
?	Rev Up	The Rezillos	as The Revillos
?	Shadows and Light	Joni Mitchell	Live

=== October ===
Day	Album	Artist	Notes
1	Group Sex	Circle Jerks	
2	New Hope for the Wretched	Plasmatics	
3	Zenyatta Mondatta	The Police	
3	Lightning to the Nations	Diamond Head	Debut
3	Universal Juveniles	Max Webster	
6	Feel Me	Cameo	
8	Dirty Mind	Prince	
8	Remain in Light	Talking Heads	
10	Chance	Manfred Mann's Earth Band	
10	Chinatown	Thin Lizzy	
10	Beat Crazy	Joe Jackson	
10	Icehouse	Icehouse	as Flowers
10	Kilimanjaro	The Teardrop Explodes	
13	INXS	INXS	Debut
13	Avoid Freud	Rough Trade	
13	Grace and Danger	John Martyn	
14	Faces	Earth, Wind & Fire	
15	Solid Pleasure	Yello	Debut
17	Making Movies	Dire Straits	
17	The River	Bruce Springsteen	
17	Levitation	Hawkwind	
17	Just Supposin'	Status Quo	
17	Love Zombies	The Monochrome Set	
20	Boy	U2	
20	The Wanderer	Donna Summer	
22	Rockabilly Blues	Johnny Cash	
24	Stage Struck	Rory Gallagher	Live
24	Organisation	Orchestral Manoeuvres in the Dark	
24	All Shook Up	Cheap Trick	
27	Drugstore Dancer	Streetheart	
31	Ace of Spades	Motörhead	
31	QE2	Mike Oldfield	
31	Dig It	Klaus Schulze	
?	Killing Joke	Killing Joke	Debut
?	Black Market Clash	The Clash	10" mini LP/US & Canada
?	Stagefright	Witchfynde	
?	Borderline	Ry Cooder	
?	Commercial Album	The Residents	
?	A-Z	Colin Newman	
?	The Concert	Creedence Clearwater Revival	Live 1970
?	Explorer Suite	New England	
?	Keeping Our Love Warm	Captain & Tennille	-
?	More George Thorogood and the Destroyers	George Thorogood and the Destroyers	
?	The Numbers	The Numbers	
?	On the Edge	The Babys	
?	Seconds of Pleasure	Rockpile	
?	The Skill	The Sherbs	
?	The Witch of Berkeley	A II Z	Live
?	Yellow EP	Gang of Four	EP
?	Greener Postures	Snakefinger	

=== November ===
Day	Album	Artist	Notes
3	The Black Album	The Damned	
3	Live...in the Heart of the City	Whitesnake	Live
3	Super Trouper	ABBA	
3	Hawks & Doves	Neil Young	
3	Slade Smashes!	Slade	Compilation
7	Gentlemen Take Polaroids	Japan	
7	In the Flat Field	Bauhaus	Debut
7	The Turn of a Friendly Card	The Alan Parsons Project	
7	Song of Seven	Jon Anderson	
7	Strong Arm of the Law	Saxon	
7	Eagles Live	Eagles	Live
7	Divine Madness	Bette Midler	Live
7	Kings of the Wild Frontier	Adam and the Ants	
7	The Official Secrets Act	M	
10	The Jazz Singer	Neil Diamond	Soundtrack
10	Your Cassette Pet	Bow Wow Wow	Debut
11	Greatest Hits	Aerosmith	Compilation
12	Ultra Wave	Bootsy Collins	
14	Beer Drinkers and Hell Raisers	Motörhead	EP
14	Visage	Visage	Debut
15	Clara Crocodio	Arrigo Barnabé	
17	Double Fantasy	John Lennon & Yoko Ono	
17	Grotesque	The Fall	
19	Barry	Barry Manilow	
21	Foolish Behaviour	Rod Stewart	
21	Gaucho	Steely Dan	
21	Hi Infidelity	REO Speedwagon	
24	Yesshows	Yes	Live
24	9 to 5 and Odd Jobs	Dolly Parton	
24	Bird Noises	Midnight Oil	EP
26	Autoamerican	Blondie	
28	Laughter	Ian Dury & The Blockheads	
28	Sound Affects	The Jam	
28	Toyah!	Toyah	Live
?	Alphabravocharliedeltaechofoxtrotgolf	Models	
?	The Birthday Party	The Boys Next Door (pre-Birthday Party)	
?	Five Great Gift Ideas from The Reels	The Reels	EP
?	Jeopardy	The Sound	
?	Loonee Tunes!	Bad Manners	
?	Stone Jam	Slave	
?	This Is My Dream	Switch	
?	Taking Liberties	Elvis Costello	Compilation

=== December ===
Day	Album	Artist	Notes
5	Live	Fleetwood Mac	Live
5	Made in America	The Blues Brothers	Live
5	The Paris Collection	Dollar	
5	Trombipulation	Parliament	
8	Flash Gordon	Queen	Soundtrack
8	Replay	Crosby, Stills & Nash	
10	Dream, After Dream	Journey	Soundtrack
12	Sandinista!	The Clash	
26	Stand in the Fire	Warren Zevon	Live
29	Arc of a Diver	Steve Winwood	
?	Angel Witch	Angel Witch	Debut
?	The Decline of Western Civilization	Various Artists	Soundtrack
?	I've Always Wanted to Do This	Jack Bruce	
?	Love Uprising	Tavares	
?	National Breakout	The Romantics	
?	Shades of Blue	Lou Rawls	

=== Release date unknown ===
- 80/81 – Pat Metheny
- 100 M.P.H. – Vardis
- Acnalbasac Noom – Slapp Happy
- Acting My Age - Graduate
- Another String of Hot Hits – The Shadows
- Army Life – The Exploited
- The Audience with Betty Carter – Betty Carter
- Authority Stealing – Fela Kuti
- Autumn – George Winston
- Baby's Got a Gun – The Only Ones
- The Beginning – Midnight Star
- Between a Hard Place and the Ground – Mike Bloomfield
- Blue Angel – Blue Angel
- The Brains – The Brains
- Breaking Glass – Hazel O'Connor – Soundtrack
- Brother Ray is at it Again – Ray Charles
- Bunny Wailer Sings the Wailers – Bunny Wailer
- Butcher Baby (EP) – Plasmatics
- Camellia III and Camellia IV – Ebiet G. Ade
- Caught You – Steel Pulse
- Cognac & Bologna – Doug and the Slugs
- Colours (Resurrection Band album) – Resurrection Band
- Chas Jankel – Chaz Jankel
- A Decade of Rock and Roll 1970 to 1980 – REO Speedwagon – Compilation
- Dome 1 – Dome
- Drastic Measures – 7 Seconds – cassette
- Dub Disco – Bunny Wailer
- Eje Nlogba – King Sunny Ade
- Empire Strikes Back Soundtrack – John Williams – Soundtrack
- Exploited Barmy Army – The Exploited
- The First, the Best and the Last – Sham 69
- Framed – Asleep at the Wheel
- Gap Band III – The Gap Band
- The Game – Sham 69
- Getting a Head – Bob Ostertag
- Gideon – Kenny Rogers
- Glass House Rock – Greg Kihn
- Good News – Sweet Honey in the Rock
- Gravity – Fred Frith
- Greatest Hits – Rita Coolidge
- Gyrate – Pylon
- Hail H.I.M. – Burning Spear
- Happy Woman Blues – Lucinda Williams
- Heathen Earth – Throbbing Gristle
- Hideaway – David Sanborn
- Hold On – Carolyne Mas
- Humans – Bruce Cockburn
- I Believe – The Buzzcocks
- Ikite Itemo Iidesuka – Miyuki Nakajima
- Immer nur träumen – Die Flippers
- In Concert, Zürich October 28, 1979 – Chick Corea and Gary Burton
- Inside Job – Dion DiMucci
- Inside My Brain – Angry Samoans
- The Inside Story – Robben Ford
- Invasion – Manilla Road
- Iron Curtain Innocence – Bobb Trimble
- It's What's Inside That Counts – Critical Mass
- Jane from Occupied Europe – Swell Maps
- The Jealous Kind – Delbert McClinton
- Joy and Pain – Maze featuring Frankie Beverly
- Just Like That – Toots & the Maytals
- Kano – Kano
- Little Stevie Orbit – Steve Forbert
- ...Live... – Klaus Schulze – Live
- Live at Last – Good Rats
- Live at the North Sea Jazz Festival, 1980 – Oscar Peterson
- Live in der Balver Höhle – Piirpauke
- Live in Vienna – Cluster & Farnbauer
- Living Dub Vol. 2 – Burning Spear
- LKJ in Dub – Linton Kwesi Johnson
- The Long Riders – Ry Cooder
- Looking at Bird – Archie Shepp
- The Lord Will Make a Way – Al Green
- Lose It Tonight – Commander Cody and His Lost Planet Airmen
- Love Approach – Tom Browne
- Love Crimes – Harlequin
- Love in Exile – Eddy Grant
- Love Sensation – Loleatta Holloway
- Maestra Vida: Primera Parte – Ruben Blades
- Make a Little Magic – Nitty Gritty Dirt Band
- Me Myself I – Joan Armatrading
- Mekons – The Mekons
- Memento z banalnym tryptykiem – SBB
- Michael Franks with Crossfire Live – Michael Franks
- Merzbild Schwet – Nurse With Wound
- Ming – David Murray Octet
- Monster – Herbie Hancock
- Music of Many Colors – Fela Kuti with Roy Ayers
- A Musical Affair – Ashford and Simpson
- My Babe – Roy Buchanan
- Never Alone – Amy Grant
- Night Passage – Weather Report
- Now We May Begin – Randy Crawford
- Nurds – The Roches
- One Bad Habit – Michael Franks
- Operation Radication – Yellowman
- Ori Mi Ja Fun Mi – King Sunny Ade
- Paranoid Time (EP) – Minutemen
- Paul Davis – Paul Davis
- Penguin Eggs – Nic Jones
- People – James Brown
- Permanent Wave – John Hartford, The Dillards
- The Personal Touch – Oscar Peterson
- Play – Magazine
- Play Me or Trade Me – Parlet
- Popo – Art Pepper and Shorty Rogers
- Pucker Up – Lipps Inc.
- Quintet '80 – David Grisman
- Rastakraut Pasta – Moebius & Plank
- Real Eyes – Gil Scott Heron
- Red Exposure – Chrome
- Reflections – Chet Atkins
- Répression – Trust
- Roky Erickson and the Aliens – Roky Erickson and the Aliens
- Running for My Life – Judy Collins
- Sails of Silver – Steeleye Span
- San Antonio Blues – Willie Nelson with Ray Price
- Selbstportrait – Vol. II – Hans-Joachim Roedelius
- Selbstportrait Vol. III "Reise durch Arcadien" – Hans-Joachim Roedelius
- Snap Crackle and Bop – John Cooper Clarke
- Sneak Me In – Lucifer's Friend
- Social Studies – Carla Bley
- Snockgrass – Michael Hurley
- Something Better Change – D.O.A.
- Soul Syndrome – James Brown
- Special People – Andrew Cyrille
- Spellbound – Dennis Brown
- Storm Windows – John Prine
- Sweat Band – Sweat Band
- Take It Easy Baby – Buckwheat Zydeco
- Tears and Laughter – Johnny Mathis
- Tennis – Chris Rea
- This Ain't Hollywood – DeGarmo and Key
- This Time – Al Jarreau
- To the Quiet Men from a Tiny Girl – Nurse With Wound
- Touch – Touch
- Trilogy: Past Present Future – Frank Sinatra
- Truth Decay – T-Bone Burnett
- Two – GQ
- Two Miles from Heaven – Mott the Hoople – Compilation
- Up-Front – The Fleshtones
- Wall of Voodoo – Wall of Voodoo
- We Are...Every One of Us – Sweet Honey in the Rock
- When Two Worlds Collide – Jerry Lee Lewis
- Where Are All the Nice Girls? - Any Trouble
- Who's Been Talking – The Robert Cray Band
- The Woman I Loved So Well - Planxty
- Yes! Jesus Loves Me – John Fahey
- You and Me at Home – John Hartford
- Zydeco Gris Gris – BeauSoleil

== Awards ==
- BBC Young Musician of the Year: Nicholas Daniel, oboist
- Boy Edgar Award: Rein de Graaff
- 1980 Country Music Association Awards
- Eurovision Song Contest 1980
- Grammy Awards of 1980
- Harriet Cohen International Music Award
- 22nd Japan Record Awards

== Biggest hit singles ==
The following songs achieved the highest chart positions in the charts of 1980.

#	Artist	Title	Year	Country	Chart entries
1	Pink Floyd	Another Brick in the Wall (part 2)	1979	(United Kingdom)	UK 1 – Dec 1979, US BB 1 – Feb 1980, Canada 1 – Jan 1980, Sweden (alt) 1 – Feb 1980, France 1 – Feb 1980, Austria 1 – Feb 1980, Switzerland 1 – Jan 1980, Norway 1 – Jan 1980, Germany 1 – Jan 1980, Republic of Ireland 1 – Dec 1979, Poland 1 of all time, US CashBox 3 of 1980, Netherlands 3 – Dec 1979, Australia 4 of 1980, KROQ 6 of 1980, POP 7 of 1980, South Africa 8 of 1980, Germany 9 of the 1980s, Europe 11 of the 1970s, Italy 12 of 1980, US BB 15 of 1980, RYM 18 of 1979, TheQ 28, Virgin 39, Belgium 50 of all time, Scrobulate 51 of live, RIAA 296, Rolling Stone 375, Acclaimed 392, OzNet 594
2	Barbra Streisand	Woman in Love	1980	(United States)	UK 1 – Oct 1980, US BB 1 – Sep 1980, Netherlands 1 – Sep 1980, Sweden (alt) 1 – Oct 1980, Austria 1 – Dec 1980, Switzerland 1 – Oct 1980, Norway 1 – Nov 1980, Germany 1 – Jan 1981, Republic of Ireland 1 – Oct 1980, Australia 1 for 2 weeks Sep 1981, South Africa 2 of 1980, Italy 3 of 1981, France 7 – Oct 1980, US CashBox 9 of 1980, Australia 21 of 1980, Germany 36 of the 1980s, RYM 157 of 1980
3	John Lennon	(Just Like) Starting Over	1980	(United Kingdom)	UK 1 – Nov 1980, US BB 1 – Nov 1980, Canada 1 – Nov 1980, Switzerland 1 – Dec 1980, Australia 1 for 4 weeks Dec 1981, Austria 2 – Feb 1981, Norway 2 – Dec 1980, Sweden (alt) 3 – Nov 1980, Germany 6 – Jan 1981, France 9 – Nov 1980, US BB 12 of 1980, Australia 18 of 1981, Italy 29 of 1981, RYM 32 of 1980, POP 49 of 1980, US CashBox 57 of 1980, Germany 298 of the 1980s, OzNet 683, Acclaimed 1637
4	Diana Ross	Upside Down	1980	(United States)	US BB 1 – Aug 1980, Sweden (alt) 1 – Aug 1980, France 1 – Aug 1980, Switzerland 1 – Aug 1980, Norway 1 – Aug 1980, New Zealand 1 for 3 weeks Oct 1980, Australia 1 for 4 weeks Aug 1981, UK 2 – Jul 1980, Netherlands 2 – Jul 1980, Austria 2 – Oct 1980, US CashBox 4 of 1980, Germany 4 – Sep 1980, Canada 8 – Sep 1980, Italy 8 of 1980, South Africa 11 of 1980, Australia 15 of 1980, POP 22 of 1980, US BB 30 of 1980, Scrobulate 42 of disco, RYM 83 of 1980, Germany 87 of the 1980s, Acclaimed 1364
5	Blondie	Call Me	1980	(United States)	UK 1 - Apr 1980 (14 weeks), US Billboard 1 - Feb 1980 (25 weeks), US BB 1 of 1980, Record World 1 - 1980, ARC 1 of 1980 (peak 1 19 weeks), Canada 1 - Mar 1980 (15 weeks), Canada RPM 1 for 3 weeks - May 1980, Top Song of 1980 of the Billboard 50th list, US CashBox 2 of 1980, WABC NY 2 of 1980, US Radio 2 of 1980 (peak 1 16 weeks), Norway 2 - May 1980 (15 weeks), Springbok 2 - Jul 1980 (15 weeks), Golden Globe in 1980 (film 'American Gigolo') (Nominated), Sweden (alt) 3 - May 1980 (20 weeks), France 3 - May 1980 (3 weeks), Switzerland 3 - May 1980 (15 weeks), Canada 3 of 1980, US Gold (certified by RIAA in Apr 1980), Austria 6 - Jun 1980 (3 months), France (SNEP) 7 - Jun 1980 (2 months), Holland 9 - May 1980 (7 weeks), Switzerland 9 of 1980, Belgium 9 - May 1980 (9 weeks), D.Marsh 10 of 1980, nuTsie 12 of 1980s, ODK Germany 14 - May 1980 (20 weeks), Germany 16 - May 1980 (3 months), Australia 19 of 1980, Scrobulate 37 of 80s, Brazil 41 of 1980, POP 42 of 1980, Billboard 50th song 44, Italy 52 of 1980, 55th Billboard 100 52 (1980), Billboard100 54, Holland free40 78 of 1980, France (InfoDisc) 155 of the 1980s (peak 4, 25 weeks, 348k sales estimated, 1980), Rolling Stone 283, OzNet 460, Acclaimed 554 (1980), UK Silver (certified by BPI in Apr 1980), RYM 23 of 1980

=== US and UK and Japan #1 hit singles ===
(in chronological order)

US #1 singles and artist	(weeks at #1)
"Please Don't Go" – KC and the Sunshine Band	(1)
"Escape (The Piña Colada Song)" – Rupert Holmes	(2 weeks in 1979 + 1 week in 1980)
"Rock with You" – Michael Jackson	(4)
"Do That to Me One More Time" – Captain & Tennille	(1)
"Crazy Little Thing Called Love" – Queen	(4)
"Another Brick in the Wall, Part II" – Pink Floyd	(4)
"Call Me" – Blondie	(6)
"Funkytown" – Lipps Inc	(4)
"Coming Up (Live At Glasgow)" – Paul McCartney	(3)
"It's Still Rock and Roll to Me" – Billy Joel	(2)
"Magic" – Olivia Newton-John	(4)
"Sailing" – Christopher Cross	(1)
"Upside Down" – Diana Ross	(4)
"Another One Bites the Dust" – Queen	(3)
"Woman in Love" – Barbra Streisand	(3)
"Lady" – Kenny Rogers	(6)
"(Just Like) Starting Over" – John Lennon	(1 week in 1980 + 2 weeks in 1981)

UK #1 singles and artist	(weeks at #1)
"Another Brick in the Wall, Part II" – Pink Floyd	(3 weeks in 1979 + 2 weeks in 1980)
"Brass in Pocket" – The Pretenders	(2)
"The Special AKA Live!" – The Specials	(2)
"Coward of the County" – Kenny Rogers	(2)
"Atomic" – Blondie	(2)
"Together We Are Beautiful" – Fern Kinney	(1)
"Going Underground/Dreams of Children" – The Jam	(3)
"Working My Way Back to You" – Detroit Spinners	(2)
"Call Me" – Blondie	(1)
"Geno" – Dexys Midnight Runners	(2)
"What's Another Year" – Johnny Logan	(2)
"Suicide Is Painless" (Theme From M*A*S*H) – The Mash	(3)
"Crying" – Don McLean	(3)
"Xanadu" – Olivia Newton-John & Electric Light Orchestra	(2)
"Use It Up and Wear It Out" – Odyssey	(2)
"The Winner Takes It All" – ABBA	(2)
"Ashes To Ashes" – David Bowie	(2)
"Start!" – The Jam	(1)
"Feels Like I'm in Love" – Kelly Marie	(2)
"Don't Stand So Close to Me" – The Police	(4), best selling single of the year
"Woman in Love" – Barbra Streisand	(3)
"The Tide Is High" – Blondie	(2)
"Super Trouper" – ABBA	(3)
"(Just Like) Starting Over" – John Lennon	(1)
"There's No One Quite Like Grandma" – St Winifred's School Choir	(1 week in 1980 + 1 week in 1981)

Japanese Oricon #1 singles and artist	(weeks at #1)
"Ihojin" – Saki Kubota	(4 weeks in 1979 + 3 weeks in 1980)
"Daitokai" – Crystal King	(6)
"Okuru Kotoba" – Kaientai	(6)
"Runaway" – Chanels	(7)
"Dancing All Night" – Monta & Brothers	(10)
"Junko / Namida no Serenade" – Tsuyoshi Nagabuchi	(6)
"Hatto Shite! Good" – Toshihiko Tahara	(2)
"Kaze wa Aki Iro / Eighteen" – Seiko Matsuda	(5)
"I'm In the Mood for Dancing" (Japanese title: "Dancing Sister" (ダンシング・シスター)) – The Nolans	(3)
"Koibito yo" – Mayumi Itsuwa	(3)
"Sneaker Blues" – Masahiko Kondō	(2 weeks in 1980 + 3 weeks in 1981)

== Top 40 Chart hit singles ==
Song title	Artist(s)	Release date(s)	US	UK	Highest chart position	Other Chart Performance(s)
"(Just Like) Starting Over"	John Lennon	November 1980	1	1	1 (8 countries)	See chart performance entry
"A Forest"	The Cure	March 1980	n/a	31	20 (Belgium)	26 (Netherlands [Dutch Top 100]) - 38 (New Zealand) - 47 (U.S. Billboard Dance Club Songs)
"Against The Wind"	Bob Seger & The Silver Bullet Band	April 1980	5	n/a	5 (US)	6 (Canada) - 8 (U.S. Billboard Hot Adult Contemporary Tracks) - 30 (Belgium) - 92 (Australia)
"Ah! Leah!"	Donnie Iris	October 1980	29	n/a	6 (Canada)	19 (U.S. Billboard Mainstream Rock) - 22 (U.S. Cash Box Top 100) - 34 (Australia)
"All Out Of Love"	Air Supply	February 1980	2	11	2 (Canada, US)	See chart performance entry
"An American Dream"	Nitty Gritty Dirt Band	January 1980	13	n/a	3 (Canada, Netherlands [Dutch Top 40])	See chart entry performance
"Amigo"	Black Slate	September 1980	n/a	9	9 (UK, New Zealand)	See chart performance entry
"Amoureux solitaires"	Lio	October 1980	n/a	n/a	1 (Italy)	3 (Netherlands [Dutch Top 40]) - 4 (Netherlands [Single Top 100]) - 6 (Austria) - 11 (West Germany) - 14 (Belgium)
"Another One Bites the Dust"	Queen	August 1980	1	7	1 (Canada, Israel, Spain, United States)	See chart performance entry
"Antmusic"	Adam and the Ants	November 1980	n/a	2	1 (Australia)	See chart performance entry
"Army Dreamers"	Kate Bush	September 1980	n/a	16	2 (Israel)	14 (Ireland) - 25 (Netherlands [Single Top 100]) - 36 (Netherlands [Dutch Top 40])
"Ashes To Ashes"	David Bowie	August 1980	n/a	1	1 (UK)	See chart performance entry
"Babooshka"	Kate Bush	June 1980	n/a	5	2 (Australia)	See chart performance entry
"Back Together Again"	Roberta Flack featuring Donny Hathaway	May 1980	56	3	3 (UK)	6 (U.S. Billboard Dance Club Songs) - 8 (U.S. Billboard Hot Soul Singles)
"Baggy Trousers"	Madness	September 1980	n/a	3	3 (UK, New Zealand)	See chart entry performance
"Banana Republic"	The Boomtown Rats	November 1980	n/a	3	3 (Germany, Ireland, Norway, UK)	See chart entry performance
"Bankrobber"	The Clash	August 1980	n/a	12	12 (United Kingdom)	14 (Ireland, New Zealand)
"Biggest Part of Me"	Ambrosia	March 1980	3	n/a	3 (US)	1 (Radio & Records) - 3 (U.S. Billboard Adult Contemporary) - 18 (Canadian RPM Top Singles) - 30 (New Zealand) - 35 (U.S. Billboard Hot Soul Singles)
"Boulevard"	Jackson Browne	June 1980	19	n/a	4 (Canada)	13 (U.S. Billboard Cash Box Top 100)
"Brass in Pocket"	The Pretenders	January 1980	14	1	1 (Ireland, South Africa, Sweden, United Kingdom)	See chart performance entry 1979 overlap
"Breakdown Dead Ahead"	Boz Scaggs	March 1980	15	n/a	8 (Canada)	12 (U.S. Cahs Box Top 100) - 65 (Australia)
"Breaking the Law"	Judas Priest	May 1980	n/a	12	12 (United Kingdom)	19 (Ireland)
"Can't Help Myself"	Flowers	June 1980	n/a	n/a	10 (Australia)	29 (New Zealand) - 50 (U.S. Billboard Dance Club Songs)
"Can't Stop the Music"	Village People	April 1980	n/a	11	1 (Australia, South Africa)	See chart performance entry
"Coming Up"	Paul McCartney	April 1980	1	2	1 (Canada, United States)	2 (Australia, New Zealand) - 2 (U.S. Cashbox Top 100) - 48 (U.S. Billboard Adult Contemporary)
"Cruisin'"	Smokey Robinson	April 1980	4	n/a	1 (New Zealand)	1 (U.S. Cash Box Top 100) - 4 (U.S. Billboard Hot Soul Singles) - 34 (U.S. Billboard Adult Contemporary) - 66 (Canada) - 70 (Australia)
"Cupid/I've Loved You For A Long Time"	The Spinners	July 1980	4	4	4 (UK)	5 (U.S. Billboard Hot Soul Singles)
"Desire"	Andy Gibb	January 1980	4	n/a	4	See chart performance entry
"Don't Ask Me Why"	Billy Joel	July 1980	19	n/a	4 (Canada)	See chart performance entry
"Don't Do Me Like That"	Tom Petty and the Heartbreakers	January 1980	10	n/a	3 (Canada)	7 (U.S. Cash Box Top 100) - 17 (New Zealand)
"Don't Fall in Love with a Dreamer"	Kenny Rogers and Kim Carnes	March 1980	4	n/a	1 (Canada)	See chart performance entry
"Dreamin'"	Cliff Richard	September 1980	10	8	1 (Denmark)	See chart performance entry
"Drivin' My Life Away"	Eddie Rabbitt	June 1980	5	n/a	5 (United States)	See chart performance entry
"Duncan"	Slim Dusty	November 1980	n/a	n/a	1 (Australia)	7 (New Zealand)
"Echo Beach"	Martha and the Muffins	February 1980	n/a	10	5 (Canada)	6 (Australia) - 11 (Ireland)
"Emotional Rescue"	The Rolling Stones	June 1980	3	9	1 (Canada)	See chart performance entry
"Everybody's Got to Learn Sometime"	The Korgis	May 1980	18	5	1 (France)	See chart performance entry
"Fame"	Irene Cara	May 1980	4	1	1 (5 countries)	See chart performance entry
"Fashion"	David Bowie	October 1980	70	5	5 (United Kingdom)	See chart performance entry
"Fire Lake"	Bob Seger and The Silver Bullet Band	January 1980	6	n/a	3 (Canada)	See chart performance entry
"Funkytown"	Lipps Inc.	March 1980	1	2	1 (14 countries)	See chart performance entry
"Games Without Frontiers"	Peter Gabriel	February 1980	48	4	3 (Ireland)	7 (Canada) - 44 (Australia) - 60 (U.S. Cashbox Top 100)
"Generals and Majors	XTC	August 1980	104	32	16 (New Zealand)	24 (Australia) - 28 (U.S. Billboard Album Rock Tracks) - 92 (Canada)
"Geno"	Dexy's Midnight Runners	March 1980	n/a	1	1 (United Kingdom)	2 (Ireland) - 44 (Australia)
"Give Me the Night"	George Benson	June 1980	4	7	3 (France)	See chart performance entry
"Going Underground"/"Dreams of Children"	The Jam	March 1980	n/a	1	1 (United Kingdom)	18 (Sweden) - 28 (New Zealand) - 50 (Australia)
"He's So Shy"	The Pointer Sisters	July 1980	3	n/a	1 (New Zealand)	See chart performance entry
"Hey!"	Julio Iglesias	1980	n/a	31	1 (Spain)	24 (Ireland) - 56 (Australia)
"Him"	Rupert Holmes	January 1980	6	31	4 (Canada)	See chart performance entry
"Hit Me with Your Best Shot"	Pat Benatar	September 1980	9	n/a	9 (United States)	7 (U.S. Cash Box Top 100) - 10 (Canada) - 33 (Australia)
"Hungry Heart"	Bruce Springsteen	October 1980	5	44	5 (Canada, United States)	See chart performance entry
"Hurt So Bad"	Linda Ronstadt	March 1980	8	n/a	8 (United States)	17 (Canada) - 25 (U.S. Billboard Adult contemporary) - 37 (Canadian RPM charts) - 43 (Netherlands [Dutch Top 40])
"I Can't Tell You Why"	Eagles	February 1980	8	n/a	5 (Canada)	2 (Canada Adult Contemporary) - 3 (U.S. Billboard Adult Contemporary) - 11 (New Zealand) - 49 (Netherlands [Single Top 100])
"I Die: You Die"	Gary Numan	August 1980	102	6	6 (United Kingdom)	16 (Ireland)
"I Got You"	Split Enz	January 1980	53	12	1 (Australia, Israel, New Zealand)	13 (Canada) - 19 (Ireland) - 50 (U.S. Cash Box Top 100)
"I Hope I Never"	Split Enz	May 1980	n/a	n/a	18 (Australia)	30 (Netherlands [Dutch Top 40]) - 33 (New Zealand)
"I Made It Through the Rain"	Barry Manilow	November 1980	10	37	10 (United States)	4 (U.S. Billboard Adult Contemporary) - 18 (U.S. Cash Box Top 100) - 20 (Ireland)
"I Pledge My Love"	Peaches & Herb	January 1980	19	n/a	1 (New Zealand)	23 (Canada) - 25 (U.S. Cash Box Top 100) - 33 (U.S. Billboard Adult Contemporary) - 37 (U.S. Billboard Hot Soul Singles)
"I Wanna Be Your Lover"	Prince	January 1980	11	41	3 (New Zealand)	1 (U.S. Billboard Hot Soul Singles) - 2 (U.S. Billboard Hot Dance Club Songs)
"I Want To Be Straight"	Ian Dury & The Blockheads	August 1980	n/a	22	18 (Australia)	n/a
"Il jouait du piano debout"	France Gall	1980	n/a	n/a	2 (France)	22 (Netherlands [Dutch Top 40]) - 26 (Netherlands [Single Top 100])
"It's Hard to Be Humble"	Mac Davis	March 1980	43	27	3 (New Zealand)	4 (Canada RPM Country) - 9 (Australia) - 10 (U.S. Billboard Country) - 14 (Canada) - 35 (U.S. Cash Box Top 100)
"Johnny and Mary"	Robert Palmer	September 1980	n/a	44	1 (Spain)	See chart performance entry
"Killer on the Loose"	Thin Lizzy	September 1980	n/a	10	5 (Ireland)	n/a
"King" / "Food for Thought"	UB40	February 1980	n/a	4	1 (New Zealand)	10 (Ireland) - 36 (Australia) - 46 (Netherlands [Single Top 100])
"Let My Love Open The Door"	Pete Townshend	June 1980	9	46	5 (Canada)	11 (U.S. Cash Box Top 100) - 82 (Australia)
"Let's Get Serious"	Jermaine Jackson	March 1980	9	n/a	9 (United States)	1 (U.S. Billboard Hot Soul Singles) - 2 (U.S. Billboard Hot Dance Club Play) - 24 (Australia)
"Little Jeannie"	Elton John	May 1980	3	33	1 (Canada)	See chart performance entry
"Longer"	Dan Fogelberg	January 1980	2	59	2 (United States)	See chart performance entry
"Looking for Clues"	Robert Palmer	November 1980	105	33	3 (Germany)	See chart performance entry
"Lost In Love"	Air Supply	January 1980	3	n/a	3 (New Zealand, United States)	1 (Canada RPM Adult Contemporary) - 1 (U.S. Billboard Adult Contemporary) - 2 (U.S. Cash Box Top 100) - 4 (Canada RPM Top Singles) - 10 (France) - 13 (Australia)
"Love Will Tear Us Apart"	Joy Division	June 1980	n/a	13	1 (New Zealand)	1 (UK Indie Singles Chart) - 26 (Australia) - 42 (U.S. Billboard Disco Top 100)
"Master Blaster (Jammin')"	Stevie Wonder	September 1980	5	2	(6 countries)	See chart performance entry
"Misunderstanding"	Genesis	May 1980	14	42	1 (Canada)	14 (U.S. Cash Box Top 100) - 32 (U.S. Billboard Adult Contemporary)
"More Love"	Kim Carnes	June 1980	10	n/a	10 (United States)	6 (U.S. Billboard Adult Contemporary) - 7 (Canada RPM Adult Contemporary) - 9 (U.S. Cash Box Top 100) - 13 (Canada) - 46 (Australia)
"More Than I Can Say"	Leo Sayer	October 1980	2	2	1 (Australia)	1 (U.S. Billboard Adult Contemporary) - 2 (Ireland, South Africa) - 3 (U.S. Cash Box Top 100) - 5 (New Zealand) - 7 (Canada)
"Me Myself I"	Joan Armatrading	June 1980	n/a	21	13 (Ireland)	13 (South Africa) - 14 (New Zealand) - 24 (Australia) - 38 (Netherlands [Single Top 100)]
"My Perfect Cousin"	The Undertones	March 1980	n/a	9	9 (United Kingdom)	9 (Ireland)
"Never Knew Love Like This Before"	Stephanie Mills	August 1980	6	4	1 (Netherlands [Dutch Top 40])	See chart performance entry
"Off the Wall"	Michael Jackson	February 1980	10	7	4 (Norway)	See chart performance entry
"On and On and On"	ABBA	September 1980	90	n/a	7 (France)	1 (U.S. Billboard Hot Dance Club Songs) - 1 (Australia) - 9 (Australia) - 24 (Japan)
"On the Radio"	Donna Summer	January 1980	5	32	2 (Canada)	See chart performance entry
"One Step Ahead"	Split Enz	November 1980	n/a	n/a	5 (Australia)	17 (Canada) - 104 (U.S. Billboard Bubbling Under Hot 100 Singles)
"People"	Mi-Sex	March 1980	n/a	n/a	3 (New Zealand)	6 (Australia)
"Pilot of the Airwaves"	Charlie Dore	February 1980	13	66	3 (Canada)	See chart performance entry
"Private Idaho"	The B-52's	October 1980	74	n/a	11 (Australia)	5 (U.S. Billboard Hot Dance Club Play) - 78 (U.S. Cash Box Top 100)
"Real Love"	The Doobie Brothers	August 1980	5	n/a	5 (United States)	7 (U.S. Cash Box Top 100) - 10 (U.S. Billboard Adult Contemporary) - 12 (Canada) - 15 (Canada RPM Adult Contemporary) - 53 (Australia)
"Rat Race"	The Specials	May 1980	n/a	5	17 (Ireland)	89 (U.S. Billboard Hot Dance Club Songs)
"Refugee"	Tom Petty and The Heartbreakers	January 1980	15	n/a	2 (Canada)	3 (New Zealand) - 11 (U.S. Cash Top Box 100) - 23 (Belgium) - 24 (Australia) - 24 (Netherlands [Dutch Top 40])
"Ride Like The Wind"	Christopher Cross	February 1980	2	69	2 (United Kingdom)	3 (Canada) - 24 (U.S. Billboard Adult Contemporary) - 31 (New Zealand)
"Running Free"	Iron Maiden	February 1980	n/a	34	34 (United Kingdom)	35 (New Zealand)
"Santa Maria"	Roland Kaiser	June 1980	n/a	n/a	1 (Germany, Netherlands)	n/a
"Sara"	Fleetwood Mac	January 1980	7	37	7 (United States)	See chart performance entry
"Sexy Eyes"	Dr. Hook	January 1980	5	4	1 (New Zealand)	See chart performance entry
"Shaddap You Face"	Joe Dolce	October 1980	53	1	1 (9 countries)	See chart performance entry
"She's Out of My Life"	Michael Jackson	April 1980	10	3	3 (United Kingdom)	See chart performance entry
"Shining Star"	The Manhattans	February 1980	5	45	2 (New Zealand)	See chart performance entry
"So Long"	Fischer-Z	March 1980	n/a	72	5 ( Portugal)	12 (Netherlands) - 14 ( Belgium) - 15 (Australia)
"The Spirit of Radio"	Rush	February 1980	51	13	13 (United Kingdom)	22 (Canada)
"Steal Away"	Robbie Dupree	April 1980	6	n/a	6 (United States)	2 (Canada RPM Adult Contemporary) - 5 (U.S. Billboard Adult Contemporary) - 14 (Canada) - 24 (Australia) - 85 (U.S. Billboard Hot Soul Singles)
"Stomp!"	The Brothers Johnson	February 1980	7	6	1 (New Zealand)	See chart performance entry
"Stop the Cavalry"	Jona Lewie	December 1980	n/a	3	1 (Austria, France)	See chart performance entry
"Take Your Time (Do It Right)"	The S.O.S. Band	March 1980	3	51	3 (New Zealand)	See chart performance entry
"Talk of the Town"	The Pretenders	April 1980	n/a	8	8 (United Kingdom)	14 (Ireland) - 24 (Netherlands [Single Top 100]) - 55 (Australia)
"This Is It"	Kenny Loggins	January 1980	11	n/a	9 (Canada)	8 (U.S. Cash Box Top 100) - 9 (Canada) - 16 (Canada RPM Adult Contemporary) - 17 (U.S. Billboard Adult Contemporary) - 19 (U.S. Billboard Hot Soul Singles) - 26 (Netherlands [Dutch top 40]) - 35 (New Zealand) - 85 (Australia)
"Tired of Toein' the Line"	Rocky Burnette	May 1980	8	58	1 (Australia)	3 (New Zealand, South Africa) - 4 (Canada) - 6 (U.S. Cash Box Top 100) - 9 (Canada RPM Adult Contemporary) - 39 (U.S. Billboard Adult Contemporary)
"Total Control"	The Motels	March 1980	n/a	n/a	7 (Australia)	9 (US Billboard Bubbling Under the Hot 100) - 11 (New Zealand) - 19 (France)
"Too Hot"	Kool & the Gang	January 1980	5	23	5 (United States)	3 (U.S. Billboard Hot Soul Singles) - 5 (U.S. Billboard Hot Dance Club Songs) - 7 (U.S. Cash Box Top 100) - 11 (U.S. Billboard Hot Adult Contemporary Tracks) - 18 (Canada)
"Touch and Go"	The Cars	August 1980	37	n/a	16 (Canada)	38 (U.S. Cash Box Top 100 Singles) - 42 (New Zealand) - 62 (Australia)
"Turn It On Again"	Genesis	March 1980	58	8	8 (Italy, United Kingdom)	12 (Ireland) - 32 (France) - 38 (Netherlands) - 49 (Canada) - 55 (U.S. Cash Box Top 100)
"Turning Japanese"	The Vapors	January 1980	36	3	1 (Australia)	See chart performance entry
"Upside Down"	Diana Ross	June 1980	1	2	1 (11 countries)	See chart performance entry
"The Wanderer"	Donna Summer	September 1980	3	48	3 (Canada)	See chart performance entry
"We Are Glass"	Gary Numan	May 1980	n/a	5	5 (United Kingdom, Israel)	9 (Ireland) - 15 (Australia) - 42 (New Zealand)
"We Can Get Together"	Flowers	September 1980	62	n/a	16 (Australia)	36 (New Zealand)
"What I Like About You"	The Romantics	January 1980	49	n/a	2 (Australia)	8 (Netherlands) - 11 (Belgium) - 53 (U.S. Cash Box Top 100)
"With You I'm Born Again"	Billy Preston and Syreeta	January 1980	4	2	2 (United Kingdom)	See chart performance entry
"Woman in Love"	Barbra Streisand	August 1980	1	1	1 (18 countries)	See chart performance entry
"Xanadu"	Olivia Newton-John and Electric Light Orchestra	June 1980	8	1	1 (10 countries)	See chart performance entry
"You May Be Right"	Billy Joel	March 1980	7	n/a	6 (Canada)	14 (South Africa) - 23 (New Zealand) - 28 (Australia) - 48 (U.S. Billboard Hot Adult Contemporary Tracks) - 60 (Japan)
"You'll Always Find Me in the Kitchen at Parties"	Jona Lewie	March 1980	n/a	16	3 (New Zealand)	21 (Australia)

== Number One hit singles ==
Song title	Artist(s)	Release date(s)	Date reached number one	Weeks at number one	Country(s)
"(Just Like) Starting Over"	John Lennon	October 1980	December 1980	5 weeks	8 countries
"Amoureux solitaires"	Lio	September 1980	October 1980	6 weeks	France, Italy
"Another Brick in the Wall (Part II)"	Pink Floyd	November 1979	December 1979	4 weeks	14 countries
"Ashes to Ashes"	David Bowie	August 1980	August 1980	2 weeks	France, United Kingdom
"Atomic"	Blondie	February 1980	March 1980	2 weeks	Luxembourg, United Kingdom
"Brass in Pocket"	The Pretenders	November 1979	January 1980	2 weeks	4 countries
"Call Me"	Blondie	February 1980	April 1980	6 weeks	4 countries
"Can't Stop the Music"	Village People	May 1980	June 1980	4 weeks	Australia, South Africa
"Coward of the County"	Kenny Rogers	November 1979	February 1980	2 weeks	Canada, Ireland, United Kingdom
"Crazy Little Thing Called Love"	Queen	October 1979	February 1980	4 weeks	4 countries
"Crying"	Don McLean	April 1980	June 1980	3 weeks	5 countries
"Do That to Me One More Time"	Captain & Tennille	October 1979	February 1980	1 week	5 countries
"Escape (The Piña Colada Song)"	Rupert Holmes	September 1979	December 1979	3 weeks	Canada, United States
"Feels Like I'm in Love"	Kelly Marie	November 1979	September 1980	2 weeks	Denmark, United Kingdom
"Fly Too High"	Janis Ian	September 1979	April 1980	1 week	South Africa
"Funkytown"	Lipps Inc.	March 1980	May 1980	4 weeks	13 countries
"Geno"	Dexys Midnight Runners	March 1980	May 1980	2 weeks	United Kingdom
"Going Underground" / "Dreams of Children"	The Jam	March 1980	March 1980	3 weeks	United Kingdom
"I Got You"	Split Enz	January 1980	March 1980	8 weeks	Australia, New Zealand
"Lady"	Kenny Rogers	September 1980	November 1980	6 weeks	United States
"Little Jeannie"	Elton John	May 1980	July 1980	2 weeks	Canada
"Magic"	Olivia Newton-John	May 1980	August 1980	4 weeks	Canada, United States
"Misunderstanding"	Genesis	March 1980	August 1980	1 week	Canada
"Montego Bay"	Jon Stevens	January 1980	January 1980	7 weeks	New Zealand
"Paradise Road"	Joy	1980	1980	9 weeks	South Africa
"Please Don't Go"	KC and the Sunshine Band	July 1979	January 1980	1 week	4 countries
"Sailing"	Christopher Cross	May 1980	August 1980	1 week	Canada, United States
"Shaddap You Face"	Joe Dolce	October 1980	November 1980	8 weeks	10 countries
"Start!"	The Jam	August 1980	August 1980	1 week	United Kingdom
"Theme from M*A*S*H (Suicide Is Painless)"	The Mash	March 1970	May 1980	3 weeks	Ireland, United Kingdom
"Sun of Jamaica"	Goombay Dance Band	November 1979	January 1980	9 weeks	5 countries
"Super Trouper"	ABBA	November 1980	November 1980	3 weeks	6 countries
"Do The Locomotion"	Ritz	June 1979	June 1980	1 weeks	New Zealand
"The Tide Is High"	Blondie	October 1980	November 1980	2 weeks	5 countries
"The Winner Takes It All"	ABBA	July 1980	August 1980	2 weeks	5 countries
"Tired of Toein' the Line"	Rocky Burnette	November 1979	June 1980	1 weeks	Argentina, Australia
"Together We Are Beautiful"	Fern Kinney	March 1979	March 1980	1 week	United Kingdom
"Too Much Too Young (EP)"	The Specials	January 1980	February 1980	2 weeks	United Kingdom
"Upside Down"	Diana Ross	June 1980	September 1980	4 weeks	9 week
"What's Another Year"	Johnny Logan	April 1980	May 1980	2 weeks	8 countries
"Working My Way Back to You"	The Detroit Spinners	December 1979	April 1980	2 weeks	Ireland, United Kingdom
"Xanadu"	Olivia Newton-John & Electric Light Orchestra	June 1980	July 1980	2 weeks	11 countries
"Santa Maria"	Roland Kaiser	June 1980	November 1980	5 weeks	Belgium, The Netherlands, West Germany
"Totus Tuus"	Dana	November 1979	January 1980	1 week	Ireland

=== Other Chart hit singles ===
- "Ace of Spades – Motörhead (# 15 UK)
- "After the News" – The Reels (# 65 Australia)
- "The Boys Light Up" – Australian Crawl (# 22 Australia)
- "Cheap Wine" - Cold Chisel (# 8 Australia)
- "Come Around" – Mental As Anything (# 18 Australia)
- "Dirty Mind" – Prince (# 65 U.S. Billboard Hot Soul Singles)
- "Downhearted" – Australian Crawl (# 12 Australia)
- "Face the Day" – The Angels (# 12 Australia)
- "Gentlemen Take Polaroids" – Japan (# 60 UK)
- "Happy House" – Siouxsie and the Banshees (# 17 UK)
- "High School Confidential" - Rough Trade (# 12 Canada, # 1 Canadian Content charts)
- "It's Only Love" - Elvis Presley (# 3 UK)
- "Just Keep Walking" – INXS (# 38 Australia)
- "Köppäbävisan" - Bengt Pegefelt (# 1 Sweden)
- "Let's Do Rock Steady" – The Bodysnatchers (# 22 UK)
- "Missing Words" – The Selecter (# 23 UK)
- "Modern Girl" – James Freud and the Radio Stars (# 12 Australia)
- "My Baby" – Cold Chisel (# 40 Australia, # 32 U.S. Billboard Mainstream Rock)
- "No Secrets" – The Angels (# 8 Australia)
- "Pearlydumm" - BZN (# 1 Netherlands)
- "Sanctuary" – Iron Maiden (# 29 UK)
- "State of the Heart" - Mondo Rock (# 6 (Australia)
- "Strangers on a Train" – The Sports (# 22 Australia)
- "Space Invaders" - Player One (# 3 Australia)
- "Superman's Big Sister" – Ian Dury & The Blockheads (# 51 UK, # 90 Australia)
- "Three Minute Hero" – The Selecter (# 16 UK)
- "Wardance" – Killing Joke (# 50 U.S. Billboard Hot Dance Club Songs )

== Notable singles ==
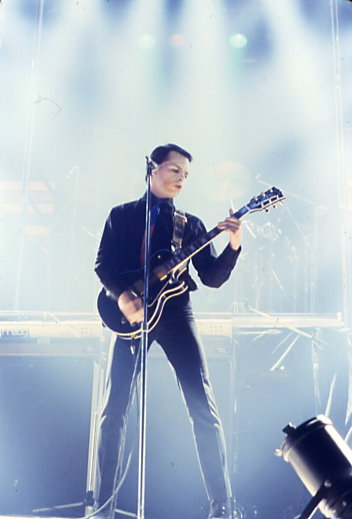
Gary Numan in 1980

Song title	Artist(s)	Release date(s)	Other Chart Performance(s)
"A Forest"	The Cure	March 1980	20 (Belgium) - 26 (Netherlands [Dutch Top 100]) - 31 (UK Singles Chart) - 38 (New Zealand) - 47 (U.S. Billboard Dance Club Songs)
"Another Nail in My Heart"	Squeeze	January 1980	10 (Irish Singles Chart) - 17 (UK Singles Chart) - 56 (Canada)
"C·30 C·60 C·90 Go" b/w "Sun Sea and Piracy"	Bow Wow Wow	July 1980	34 (UK Singles Chart)
"Freedom of Choice"	Devo	May 1980	8 (US Billboard Hot Dance Club Songs) - 71 (Australia) - 103 (US Billboard Bubbling Under the Hot 100)
"The Breaks"	Kurtis Blow	June 1980	4 (U.S. Billboard Hot Soul Singles) - 9 (U.S. Billboard Dance chart) - 87 (U.S. Billboard Hot 100)
"The Friend Catcher"	The Birthday Party	September 1980	21 (UK Indie Charts)
"Holiday in Cambodia"	The Dead Kennedys	September 1980	2 (UK Indie Charts)
"I Will Follow"	U2	October 1980	20 (U.S. Billboard Top Tracks) - 34 (New Zealand) - 71 (Australia) Note: This single charted in 1981.
"Kill the Poor"	Dead Kennedys	October 1980	1 (UK Indie Chart) - 49 (UK Singles Chart)
"Love Will Tear Us Apart"	Joy Division	June 1980	1 (New Zealand) - 1 (UK Indie Singles Chart) - 13 (UK Singles Chart) - 26 (Australia) - 42 (U.S. Billboard Disco Top 100)
"Rescue"	Echo & the Bunnymen	May 1980	62 (UK Singles Chart)
"Sister Europe"	The Psychedelic Furs	February 1980	47 (New Zealand) - 100 (Australia)
"Wardance"	Killing Joke	February 1980	50 (U.S. Billboard Hot Dance Club Songs)

=== Other notable singles ===
- "After the News" – The Reels
- "Girl U Want" – Devo
- "I Wanna Destroy You" – The Soft Boys
- "Janitor" – Suburban Lawns
- "Just Keep Walking" - INXS
- "Mr. Clarinet" – The Birthday Party
- "Two People Per Sq. Km." – Models
- "Simple Simon" – INXS
- "Too Many Creeps" – Bush Tetras

== Classical music ==
- George Crumb – A Little Suite for Christmas, A.D. 1979, for piano
- Mario Davidovsky
  - Consorts, for symphonic band
  - String Quartet No. 4
- Peter Maxwell Davies
  - Farewell to Stromness (interlude from The Yellow Cake Review), for piano, Op. 89, No. 1
  - Symphony No. 2, Op. 91
  - A Welcome to Orkney, for ensemble, Op. 90
  - The Yellow Cake Revue, for singer or reciter and piano, Op. 88
  - Yesnaby Ground (interlude from The Yellow Cake Review), for piano, Op. 89, No. 2
- Sofia Gubaidulina – Offertorium («Жертвоприношение»), concerto for violin and orchestra
- Helmut Lachenmann – Ein Kinderspiel, seven little pieces for piano
- Trygve Madsen – Sonata for Tuba and Piano
- Arvo Pärt – De profundis, for accompanied chorus; first performance 1981
- Krzysztof Penderecki – Symphony No. 2: "Christmas"'
- Simeon ten Holt
  - Natalon in E for piano
  - Bi-Ba-Bo for vocal quartet

== Opera ==
- Peter Maxwell Davies – Cinderella (children's opera)
- Lorenzo Ferrero – Marilyn
- Margaret Garwood – Rappacini's Daughter
- Philip Glass – Satyagraha
- Kirke Mechem – Tartuffe
- William Mathias – The Servants (libretto by Iris Murdoch)
- Karlheinz Stockhausen – Donnerstag aus Licht
- Mieczysław Weinberg – The Portrait

== Musical theater ==
- Barnum – Broadway production opened at the St. James Theatre on April 30 and ran for 854 performances
- Brigadoon (Lerner & Loewe) – Broadway revival opened at the Majestic Theatre on October 16 and ran for 133 performances
- Camelot (Lerner & Loewe) – Broadway revival opened at the New York State Theater on July 8 and ran for 56 performances
- Colette – London production opened at the Comedy Theatre on September 24 and ran for 47 performances
- A Day in Hollywood/A Night in the Ukraine – Broadway production opened at the John Golden Theatre on April 2 and transferred to the Royale Theatre on June 17 for a total run of 588 performances
- Forty-Second Street – Broadway production opened at the Winter Garden Theatre on August 25, transferred to the Majestic Theatre on March 30, 1981, and transferred to the St. James Theatre on April 7, 1987, for a total run of 3486 performances
- The Life and Adventures Of Nicholas Nickleby – London production opened at the Aldwych Theatre on June 5
- On The Twentieth Century – London production opened at Her Majesty's Theatre on March 19 and ran for 165 performances
- Sweeney Todd (Stephen Sondheim) – London production opened at the Drury Lane Theatre on July 2 and ran for 157 performances
- The Umbrellas Of Cherbourg London production opened at the Phoenix Theatre on April 10
- West Side Story (Leonard Bernstein) – Broadway revival opened at the Minskoff Theatre on February 14 and ran for 333 performances

== Musical films ==
- The Blues Brothers
- Can't Stop the Music
- Fame
- The Idolmaker
- The Jazz Singer
- Kallukkul Eeram
- La boum
- One Trick Pony
- Popeye
- Qurbani
- Ram Balram
- Times Square
- Xanadu

== Births ==
- January 11 – Lee Ji-hye, South Korean singer (Sharp)
- January 12 – Amerie, American singer, songwriter, actress and writer
- January 14 – Hiroshi Tamaki, Japanese actor, model, and singer
- January 15 – Lydia, Spanish singer
- January 16 – Lin-Manuel Miranda, American playwright, singer, songwriter, rapper and composer
- January 17 – Zooey Deschanel, American actress and singer-songwriter.
- January 18 – Estelle, British singer, songwriter, rapper, record producer, and actress
- January 21 – Nana Mizuki, Japanese voice actress and singer
- January 22 – Bart Claessen, Dutch DJ and record producer
- January 28
  - Nick Carter, American singer, actor and musician (Backstreet Boys)
  - Brian Fallon, American singer-songwriter and guitarist
- January 30
  - Wilmer Valderrama, American actor, singer, producer and television personality
  - Josh Kelley, American musician
  - Mikey, South Korean singer (Turbo)
- February 3 – Sarah Lewitinn, American record producer and journalist
- February 5 – Tiwa Savage, Nigerian singer
- February 7
  - William Tell, rhythm guitarist and backing vocalist for the piano rock band Something Corporate.
  - Lee Jung-hyun, South Korean actress and singer
- February 12 – Gucci Mane, American rapper
- February 15 – Conor Oberst, American singer-songwriter (Bright Eyes)
- February 17 – Vahe Tilbian, Ethiopian singer
- February 18
  - Cezar, Romanian opera singer and pianist
  - Regina Spektor, Russian-American singer-songwriter
- February 22
  - Shamari Fears, American singer-songwriter and actress (Blaque)
  - Kang Sung-hoon, South Korean singer
- February 27
  - Cyrus Bolooki, (New Found Glory)
  - Bobby V, American R&B singer
  - Yoon Min-soo, South Korean singer (4Men)
- February 26 – Alex Fong Lik-Sun, Hong Kong singer and actor
- February 28 – Choi Sung-hee, South Korean singer (S.E.S.)
- March 1 – Russ Spencer, English singer and television presenter (Scooch)
- March 2
  - Vince Walker, American rock singer (Suburban Legends)
  - Rebel Wilson, Australian actress, writer, comedienne, singer and producer
- March 7 – Laura Prepon, American actress and director
- March 8 – Charli Robinson, Australian actress, singer and dancer
- March 9 – Chingy, American rapper
- March 13
  - Flavia Cacace, Italian dancer
  - Kim Nam-gil, South Korean actor
- March 18 – Chantelle Barry, Australian actress and singer (Bardot)
- March 19 – Agnes Pihlava, Finnish pop singer
- March 20
  - Mikk Murdvee, violinist and conductor
  - Ock Joo-hyun, South Korean singer (Fin.K.L)
- March 21
  - Deryck Whibley, Canadian musician and producer (Sum 41) (Avril Lavigne)
  - Lee Jin, South Korean singer (Fin.K.L)
- March 22 – Shannon Bex, American singer, reality show personality, professional dancer (Danity Kane. Dumblonde)
- March 26 – Son Ho-young, South Korean-American singer and actor (g.o.d)
- March 27
  - Tai Orathai, Luk Thung singer
  - Sean Ryan, American footballer
- March 28 – Rasmus Seebach, Danish singer-songwriter and record producer
- March 29 – Andy Scott-Lee, Welsh singer (3SL) brother of Lisa Scott-Lee
- March 30 – Yalin, Turkish pop singer and songwriter
- March 31
  - Trenyce, American singer
  - Maaya Sakamoto, Japanese singer
- April 5 – Lee Jae-won, South Korean rapper (H.O.T., jtL)
- April 9 – Albert Hammond Jr, American guitarist (The Strokes)
- April 10 – Bryce Soderberg, Canadian musician (Lifehouse)
- April 12 – Brian McFadden, Irish (Was part of Westlife)
- April 14 – Win Butler, American/Canadian musician
- April 15 – Patrick Carney, American musician and producer (The Black Keys) (Michelle Branch)
- April 16 – Jake Andrews, American singer-songwriter and guitarist
- April 21 – Rai Thistlethwayte, Australian Thirsty Merc, Sun Rai, Jazz, Rock Musician (Worked with Delta Goodrem)
- April 23 – Taio Cruz, English singer-songwriter
- April 24 – Danny Gokey, American Idol season 8 finalist
- April 26 – Channing Tatum, American dancer, performer and actor (Jessie J, Jenna Dewan)
- April 28 – Robert Skowronski, Swedish singer (Supernatural)
- April 29 – Kian Egan (Westlife)
- May 3 – Souleye (hip hop artist), American rapper and hip hop artist (Bassnectar, BLVD, Alanis Morissette)
- May 5
  - Maia Hirasawa, Swedish pop singer
  - Hank Green, American singer, songwriter, educator, blogger, science communicator, entrepreneur and author
- May 6 – Taebin, Korean hip-hop artist (1TYM)
- May 8 – Michelle McManus, Scottish singer and television presenter
- May 10 – Madeleine Sami, New Zealand musician, actress, comedian, and film producer
- May 12 – Romina Arena, Italian-American singer-songwriter
- May 16 – Harmony Samuels, English record producer, composer and songwriter
- May 17 – Ariën van Weesenbeek, Dutch drummer, screamer, keyboardist, percussion (Epica, MaYaN)
- May 21
  - Gotye, Australian multi-instrumental musician and singer-songwriter (Kimbra)
  - Anika Moa, New Zealand recording artist, activist and television presenter
- May 24 – Cecilia Cheung, Hong Kong singer and actress
- May 28
  - Mark Feehily (Westlife)
  - Lindi Ortega, Canadian country singer-songwriter
- May 30 – Remy Ma, American rapper and songwriter (Terror Squad)
- May 31 – Andy Hurley, American drummer (Fall Out Boy and The Damned Things)
- June 2 – Orish Grinstead, American R&B singer (died 2008)
- June 5 – Brandi Shearer, American singer-songwriter
- June 6 – Peter Mosely, American bass player (Yellowcard and Inspection 12)
- June 7 – Henkka Seppälä, Finnish bassist (Children of Bodom)
- June 13 – Sarah Connor, German singer
- June 16 – Joey Yung, Hong Kong singer
- June 17 – Kimeru, Japanese singer
- June 18 – Colin Munroe, Canadian singer-songwriter and producer
- June 20 – Tony Lovato (Mest)
- June 23
  - Jessica Taylor, English singer, television personality, and dancer (Liberty X)
  - Theresa Wayman, also known by the stage name TT, is an American musician, singer-songwriter and occasional actress, best known as guitarist and vocalist of the indie rock band Warpaint.
- June 26 – Jason Schwartzman (Phantom Planet)
- June 27 – Jennifer Goodridge, American keyboard player (Your Enemies Friends)
- June 29 – Katherine Jenkins, Welsh soprano
- July 1 – Ko Ji-yong, South Korean singer and businessman (Sechs Kies)
- July 2 – Ciara Sotto, Filipina singer and actress
- July 3 – Kid Sister, American rapper
- July 5
  - Pauly D, American DJ (Britney Spears)
  - Mads Tolling, Danish-American violinist and composer (Turtle Island Quartet)
- July 6 – Joell Ortiz, American rapper (Slaughterhouse)
- July 10
  - Jessica Simpson, American singer-songwriter, designer and actress
  - Julie Crochetière, Canadian singer
  - Claudia Leitte, Brazilian singer and TV personality
- July 11 – Jenny Hval, Norwegian singer-songwriter, record producer and musician.
- July 13
  - Corey Clark, American singer
  - Emile Haynie, American record producer (Lana Del Rey, Bruno Mars, Dua Lipa, Florence Welch)
- July 15 – JW-Jones, Canadian blues artist
- July 16 – Jang Su-won, South Korean singer (Sechs Kies)
- July 17 – Kaya (Japanese musician), Japanese visual kei musician, EDM artist
- July 18 – Kristen Bell, American actress, vocal actress and singer
- July 19 – Xavier Malisse. Belgian tennis player
- July 20
  - Dado Dolabella, Brazilian actor and singer
  - Mike Kennerty (The All-American Rejects)
- July 21 – Really Doe, American rapper
- July 22
  - Kate Ryan, Belgian singer-songwriter
  - Tablo, South Korean-Canadian rapper, songwriter, record producer, and author
- July 23 – Sandeep Parikh, American writer, director, actor and producer
- July 25 – Diam's, French rapper and singer of Greek Cypriot origin.
- July 30 – Seth Avett, American singer and guitarist (The Avett Brothers)
- July 5 – Rebeka Dremelj, Slovenian singer
- July 26 – Dave Baksh (Sum 41)
- July 28
  - Stephen Christian, American Christian rock singer (Anberlin)
  - Noel Sullivan, Welsh singer (Hear'Say) and actor
- July 30 – Diam's, French rapper
- August 9 – Rob Knox, American producer and singer-songwriter
- August 12
  - Matt Thiessen, Canadian singer/guitarist
  - Jade Villalon, American singer-songwriter, pianist, and actress (Sweetbox)
- August 16
  - Vanessa Carlton, American singer-songwriter, musician
  - Øystein Moen, Norwegian pianist and composer (Puma and Jaga Jazzist)
  - Bob Hardy, English bassist (Franz Ferdinand)
  - Hwangbo, South Korean singer and rapper (Chakra)
- August 17 – Lene Marlin, Norwegian singer and musician
- August 19
  - Houcine Camara, French singer
  - Darius Danesh, Scottish singer-songwriter & actor
  - Jun Jin, South Korean singer (Shinhwa)
- August 20 - Mayra Veronica, American singer, model, actress and television personality
- August 26
  - Macaulay Culkin, American actor, author, painter, podcaster, musician and president of Bunnyears
  - Jim Beanz, American music producer, singer, songwriter and record producer
- August 28 – Carly Pope, Canadian actress
- August 29
  - Nicholas Tse, Hong Kong singer-songwriter and actor
  - Richa Sharma, playback singer
- August 30 – Alicia Warrington, American drummer (Lillix)
- August 31 – Joe Budden, American rapper
- September 3 – B.G., American rapper
- September 5 – Kevin Simm, English singer (Liberty X)
- September 6 – Kerry Katona, English singer, author, model (Atomic Kitten)
- September 7 – Nigar Jamal, Azerbaijani singer
- September 9 – Michelle Williams, American actress
- September 10 – Mikey Way, bassist of My Chemical Romance
- September 13 – Teppei Teranishi (Thrice)
- September 14 – Ayọ, Nigerian-German singer-songwriter and actress
- September 15 – Jolin Tsai, a Taiwanese singer, songwriter, and actress.
- September 16 – Special D., German DJ and producer
- September 19 – Tegan and Sara Quin (Tegan And Sara), Canadian singer-songwriters, musicians, multi-instrumentalists
- September 20 – Yung Joc, American rapper
- September 21
  - Kareena Kapoor Khan, Indian actress
  - Disco D, American record producer and composer (d. 2007)
- September 24
  - Homeboy Sandman, American rapper
  - Anna Calvi, English singer-songwriter and guitarist
- September 25 – T.I., American rapper
- September 29
  - Dallas Green (musician), Canadian singer/songwriter
  - Zachary Levi, American actor, singer and comedian
- October 1 – Kim-Lian, Dutch actress, presenter, and singer-songwriter
- October 3 – Danny O'Donoghue, Irish singer
- October 5 – Paul Thomas (Good Charlotte)
- October 8 – Nick Cannon, American actor and rapper
- October 10 – Sherine, Egyptian singer
- October 11 – Colleen Lee, Hong Kong classical pianist
- October 12 – Soledad Pastorutti, Argentine folklore singer and The Voice coach
- October 13 – Ashanti, American singer-songwriter, actress, dancer
- October 15 – Siiri Nordin, Finnish singer-songwriter
- October 18 – Josh Gracin, American singer
- October 20
  - Gary Jarman, British bassist & vocalist (The Cribs)
  - Ryan Jarman, British guitarist & vocalist (The Cribs)
- October 21 – Brian Pittman, American bassist (Relient K)
- October 22 – Garrett Tierney, American bassist (Brand New)
- October 23 – Yoo Soo-young, South Korean singer (S.E.S.)
- October 24
  - Kaushiki Chakraborty, Indian classical vocalist
  - Monica, American singer, songwriter, producer and actress
- October 27 – Tanel Padar, Estonian singer-songwriter and guitarist
- October 28 – Natina Reed, American singer, rapper and actress (Blaque) (d. 2012)
- October 29 – Ben Foster, American actor
- October 31 – Isabella Summers, English musician, songwriter, producer, remixer, DJ (Florence and the Machine).
- November 3 – Dan Marsala, American musician
- November 4 – George Huff, American singer
- November 5 – Essaï Altounian, French-Armenian actor, singer-songwriter, keyboardist and music producer
- November 7 – Karthik, playback singer
- November 10 – Calvin Chen, Taiwanese pop singer
- November 12
  - Shaun Cooper, American bass player
  - Ryan Gosling, American actor, musician and singer (contributed music to: Dead Man's Bone, La La Land, Barbie (film))
- November 14 – Matt Brann, Canadian drummer
- November 15 – Ace Young, American singer and reality show finalist
- November 17 – Isaac Hanson (Hanson)
- November 18 – Dustin Kensrue (Thrice)
- November 26 – Satoshi Ohno, Japanese singer
- November 28 – Lisa Middelhauve, German singer (Xandria)
- November 29 – Janina Gavankar, American musician and actress
- December 1 – Roger Peterson, Aruban-Dutch singer-songwriter
- December 3
  - Jenna Dewan, American dancer, performer, business woman, choreographer, producer, actor and television host
  - Natalia, Belgian singer
- December 5 – Ibrahim Maalouf, trumpeter
- December 6 – Kei Yasuda, Japanese singer
- December 7 – Choi Jung-in, South Korean singer
- December 8 – Kate Voegele, American singer-songwriter and actress
- December 9 – Simon Helberg, American actor, comedian, singer and pianist
- December 10
  - Sarah Chang, American classical violinist
  - Chris Gaylor (The All-American Rejects)
- December 14 – Tata Young, Thai-American singer and actress
- December 16 – Axle Whitehead, Australian singer, musician, TV host and actor
- December 18 – Christina Aguilera, American R&B-Soul singer-songwriter
- December 19 – Verbal Jint, South Korean musician, rapper and record producer
- December 20 – Yangwei Linghua, Chinese singer, member of Phoenix Legend
- December 24
  - Tomas Kalnoky, American musician (Streetlight Manifesto)
  - Maarja-Liis Ilus, Estonian pop singer and presenter
- December 25 – Park Ji-young, South Korean singer, dancer and actress, former leader of After School

== Deaths ==
- January 1 – Adolph Deutsch (82), American composer
- January 2 – J. Mayo Williams (85), African American blues music producer
- January 3 – Amos Milburn (52), African American R&B singer and pianist
- January 6
  - Poley McClintock, jazz musician
  - Georgeanna Tillman (36), pop and R&B singer
- January 7 – Larry Williams (44), singer, songwriter and pianist
- January 13 – Andre Kostelanetz (78), Russian-born conductor and arranger
- January 21 – Elvira de Hidalgo (88), coloratura soprano and singing teacher
- January 29
  - Jimmy Durante (86), pianist & entertainer
  - Edward Lewis (79), founder of Decca Records
- January 30 – Professor Longhair (61), pianist
- February 17 – Jerry Fielding (57), American conductor and music director (heart failure)
- February 18
  - Muriel Brunskill (80), British contralto
  - Gale Robbins (58), American singer and actress (lung cancer)
- February 19 – Bon Scott (33), lead singer of AC/DC (acute alcohol poisoning)
- February 28 – Dinorá de Carvalho (75), Brazilian pianist, conductor and composer
- March 5 – Winifred Wagner (82), daughter-in-law of Richard Wagner, close friend of Adolf Hitler (born 1897)
- March 14 – Anna Jantar (29), Polish singer (air crash)
- March 18 - Jessica Dragonette (80), American singer
- March 23 – Jacob Miller (27), reggae artist
- March 25 – Walter Susskind (66), Czech conductor
- March 26
  - John Poulos (32), the Buckinghams, drug overdose
  - Ted Shapiro (80), songwriter & pianist
- March 28 – Dick Haymes, (63), Argentinian-born US singer and actor
- March 29 – Mantovani (74), Italian-born British orchestra leader and composer
- April 4 – Red Sovine (62), American country & folk singer & songwriter
- April 20 – Katherine Kennicott Davis (87), American composer
- April 22 – Jane Froman (72), American singer and actress
- April 28 – Tommy Caldwell (30), bassist of Marshall Tucker Band (car accident)
- May 4 – Joe "Mr Piano" Henderson (60), pianist (heart attack)
- May 18 – Ian Curtis (23), lead singer of Joy Division (suicide)
- May 30 – Carl Radle (37), rock bassist
- June 11 – Bolesław Woytowicz (80), Polish pianist and composer
- June 16 – Bob Nolan (72), country singer and songwriter
- June 20 – Allan Pettersson (68), Swedish composer
- June 21 – Bert Kaempfert (56), German composer, bandleader and arranger (stroke)
- June 27 – Barney Bigard (74), jazz clarinetist
- June 28 – José Iturbi (84), pianist
- July 5 – A. J. Potter (72), Irish composer
- July 9 – Vinicius de Moraes (66), Brazilian lyricist and composer
- July 14 – Malcolm Owen (26), Lead singer The Ruts (overdose)
- July 15 – Ben Selvin (82), "The Dean of Recorded Music"
- July 23 – Keith Godchaux (32), keyboardist with Grateful Dead (car accident)
- July 25 – Vladimir Vysotsky (42), Russian singer-songwriter, poet, actor (heart failure)
- July 31 – Mohammed Rafi (55), Indian singer (heart attack)
- August 5 - George Scott III (26), American No Wave bassist for Contortions and John Cale, heroin overdose
- August 11 – Jacques Singer (70), conductor
- August 17 – Harold Adamson (73), lyricist
- August 18 – John Sebastian (66), harmonica virtuoso
- August 20 – Joe Dassin (41), singer (heart attack)
- August 22 – Cosmé McMoon (79), pianist and composer
- August 26 – Miliza Korjus (71), Estonian-Polish opera singer
- September 2 – Marcel Ciampi (89), French pianist and teacher
- September 7 – Arvella Gray (74), blues and folk singer and guitarist
- September 12 – Lillian Randolph (81), actress and singer
- September 15 – Bill Evans (51), jazz pianist
- September 16 – Ludmila Červinková (72), operatic soprano
- September 17 – Waldemar Seidel (87), Australian pianist
- September 18 – Walter Midgley (67), English operatic tenor
- September 25 – John Bonham (32), drummer (Led Zeppelin) (pulmonary aspiration)
- September 30 – Horace Finch (74), pianist and organist
- October 3 – Jerzy Żurawlew (93), pianist, conductor, teacher, and founder of the International Chopin Piano Competition.
- October 25 – Virgil Fox (68), organist (cancer)
- October 27 – Steve Peregrin Took (31), bongo player for Tyrannosaurus Rex later a solo artist/frontman (asphyxiation)
- November 15 – Bill Lee (64), American actor and playback singer (brain tumor)
- December 7 – Darby Crash (22), singer of the (Germs) (suicide)
- December 8 – John Lennon (40), singer, guitarist and songwriter (The Beatles) (murdered)
- December 24 – Siggie Nordstrom (87), American model, actress, entertainer, socialite and lead singer (The Nordstrom Sisters)
- December 29 – Tim Hardin (39), singer-songwriter (heroin overdose)
- December 31 – Robert Pete Williams (66), blues singer and guitarist
