= Symphony No. 2 in C minor =

Symphony No. 2 in C minor may refer to:

- Symphony No. 2 (Bruckner) – Anton Bruckner (1872)
- Symphony No. 2 in C minor, Op. 17 – Pyotr Ilyich Tchaikovsky (1872)
- Symphony No. 2 "Hakon Jarl", Op. 134 – Carl Reinecke (1874-75, rev. 1888)
- Symphony No. 2 "Symphonie tragique", Op. 32 – Asger Hamerik (1882–83)
- Symphony No. 2 (Mahler) – Gustav Mahler (1888) (also known as the Resurrection Symphony)
- Symphony No. 2, Op. 28 – Louis Glass (1899)
- Symphony No. 2 in C minor, Op. 29 – Alexander Scriabin (1901)
- Symphony No. 2 "Asrael", Op. 27 – Joseph Suk (1905)
- Symphony No. 2, Op. 85 – Hugo Kaun (1908)
- Symphony No. 2, Op. 12 – Alfredo Casella (1908–09)
- Symphony No. 2 in C minor, Op. 19 – Dmitry Kabalevsky (1934)
- Symphony No. 2, Op. 9 – Tikhon Khrennikov (1940, rev. 1942)

== See also ==
- List of symphonies in C minor
- Symphony No. 2
