= Symphony No. 2 =

Symphony No. 2 may refer to:

- Symphony No. 2 (Akses) by Necil Kazım Akses, 1978
- Symphony No. 2 (Albert) by Stephen Albert, completed by Sebastian Currier
- Symphony No. 2 (Alwyn) by William Alwyn, 1953
- Symphony No. 2 (Arel) by Bülent Arel, 1952
- Symphony No. 2 (Arnold) (Op. 40) by Malcolm Arnold, 1953
- Symphony No. 2 (Asia) (Celebration) by Daniel Asia, 1988–90
- Symphony No. 2 (Balakirev) by Mily Balakirev, 1900–1908
- Symphony No. 2 (Barber) (Op. 19) by Samuel Barber, 1944
- Symphony No. 2 (Bax) in E minor and C major by Arnold Bax, 1924–26
- Symphony No. 2 (Beethoven) in D major (Op. 36) by Ludwig van Beethoven, 1801–02
- Symphony No. 2 (Berkeley) by Lennox Berkeley, 1958
- Symphony No. 2 (Bernstein) (The Age of Anxiety) by Leonard Bernstein, 1948–49, revised 1965
- Symphony No. 2 (Berwald) in D major (Capricieuse) by Franz Berwald, 1842
- Symphony No. 2 (Borodin) in B minor by Alexander Borodin, 1869–76
- Symphony No. 2 (Brahms) in D major (Op. 73) by Johannes Brahms, 1877
- Symphony No. 2 (Brian) in E minor by Havergal Brian, 1930–31
- Symphony No. 2 (Bruch) in F minor (Op. 36) by Max Bruch, 1870
- Symphony No. 2 (Bruckner) in C minor (Symphony of Pauses) by Anton Bruckner, 1872
- Symphony No. 2 (Brustad) by Bjarne Brustad, 1951
- Symphony No. 2 (Chávez) (Sinfonía india) by Carlos Chávez, 1935–36
- Symphony No. 2 (Ching) (The Imp of the Perverse) by Jeffrey Ching, 1992
- Symphony No. 2 (Clementi) in D major (WoO 33) by Muzio Clementi
- Symphony No. 2 (Copland) (Short Symphony) by Aaron Copland, 1933
- Symphony No. 2 (Corigliano) by John Corigliano, 2000
- Symphony No. 2 (Cowell) (Anthropos) by Henry Cowell, 1938
- Symphony No. 2 (Davies) in B minor by Peter Maxwell Davies, 1980
- Symphony No. 2 (Diamond) by David Diamond, 1942–43
- Symphony No. 2 (d'Indy) in B♭ (Op. 57) by Vincent d'Indy, 1902–03
- Symphony No. 2 (Dohnányi) in E (Op. 40) by Ernő Dohnányi, 1944
- Symphony No. 2 (Draeseke) in F major (Op. 25) by Felix Draeseke, 1876
- Symphony No. 2 (Dutilleux) (Le double) by Henri Dutilleux, 1959
- Symphony No. 2 (Dvořák) in B♭ major (Op. 4, B. 12) by Antonín Dvořák, 1865
- Symphony No. 2 (Elgar) in E♭ major (Op. 63) by Edward Elgar, 1911
- Symphony No. 2 (Enescu) in A major (Op. 17) by George Enescu, 1912–14
- Symphony No. 2 (English) in D minor (Op. 5) by George English, 1933
- Symphony No. 2 (Ficher) (Op. 24) by Jacobo Ficher, 1933
- Symphony No. 2 (Furtwängler) in E minor by Wilhelm Furtwängler, 1945–46
- Symphony No. 2 (Geißler) by Fritz Geißler, 1962–64
- Symphony No. 2 (in One Movement)(Gipps), Op. 30 by Ruth Gipps 1945
- Symphony No. 2 (Glass) by Philip Glass, 1994
- Symphony No. 2 (Glazunov) in F♯ minor (Op. 16) by Alexander Glazunov, 1884–86
- Symphony No. 2 (Glière) in C minor (Op. 25) by Reinhold Glière, 1907
- Symphony No. 2 (Goldmark) in E♭ (Op. 35) by Karl Goldmark
- Symphony No. 2 (Górecki) (Op. 31, Copernican) by Henryk Górecki, 1972
- Symphony No. 2 (Gounod) in E♭ major by Charles Gounod, 1855
- Symphony No. 2 (Hanson) in D♭ major (Opus 30, W45, Romantic) by Howard Hanson, 1930
- Symphony No. 2 (Harbison) by John Harbison, 1987
- Symphony No. 2 (Hartmann) by Karl Amadeus Hartmann, 1946
- Symphony No. 2 (Haydn) in C major (Hoboken I/2) by Joseph Haydn, 1757–61
- Symphony No. 2 (Michael Haydn) in C major (MH 37, Perger 2, Sherman 2) by Michael Haydn, 1761
- Symphony No. 2 (Henze) by Hans Werner Henze, 1949
- Symphony No. 2 (Honegger) in D (Symphony for strings) by Arthur Honegger, 1937–42
- Symphony No. 2 (Hovhaness) (Op. 132, Mysterious Mountain) by Alan Hovhaness
- Symphony No. 2 (Ivanovs) in D minor by Jānis Ivanovs, 1937
- Symphony No. 2 (Ives) by Charles Ives, 1897–1902
- Symphony No. 2 (Kalinnikov) in A major by Vasily Kalinnikov, 1895-97
- Symphony No. 2 (Khachaturian) in E minor (The Bell) by Aram Khachaturian, 1943–44
- Symphony No. 2 (Liebermann) (Op. 67) by Lowell Liebermann, 1999
- Symphony No. 2 (Lilburn) by Douglas Lilburn, 1951
- Symphony No. 2 (Lutosławski) by Witold Lutosławski, 1965–67
- Symphony No. 2 (MacMillan) by James MacMillan, 1999
- Symphony No. 2 (Madetoja) in E♭ major (Op. 35) by Leevi Madetoja, 1916–18
- Symphony No. 2 (Magnard) in E (Op. 6) by Albéric Magnard, 1893
- Symphony No. 2 (Mahler) (Resurrection) by Gustav Mahler, 1888–94
- Symphony No. 2 (Marco) (Espacio cerrado) by Tomás Marco 1985
- Symphony No. 2 (Martinů) (H. 295) by Bohuslav Martinů, 1943
- Symphony No. 2 (Méhul) in D major by Étienne Méhul, 1808–09
- Symphony No. 2 (Melartin) in E minor (Op. 30 No. 2) by Erkki Melartin, 1904
- Symphony No. 2 (Mendelssohn) in B♭ major (Op. 52, MWV A 18, Lobgesang) by Felix Mendelssohn, 1840
- Symphony No. 2 (Milhaud) (Op. 247) by Darius Milhaud, 1944
- Symphony No. 2 (Moore) in A major by Douglas Moore, 1945
- Symphony No. 2 (Mozart) in B♭ major, KV 17, possibly by Leopold Mozart
- Symphony No. 2 (Myaskovsky) in C♯ minor (Op. 11) by Nikolai Myaskovsky, 1911
- Symphony No. 2 (Natra) (Symphony for String Orchestra No. 2) by Sergiu Natra, 1959
- Symphony No. 2 (Nielsen) (Op. 16, FS 29, The Four Temperaments) by Carl Nielsen, 1901–02
- Symphony No. 2 (Paine) in A major (Op. 34, In Spring) by John Knowles Paine, 1879
- Symphony No. 2 (Pärt) by Arvo Pärt, 1966
- Symphony No. 2 (Penderecki) (Christmas) by Krzysztof Penderecki, 1979–80
- Symphony No. 2 (Piston) by Walter Piston, 1943
- Symphony No. 2 (Prokofiev) in D minor (Op. 40) by Sergei Prokofiev, 1924–25
- Symphony No. 2 (Rachmaninoff) in E minor (Op. 27) by Sergei Rachmaninoff, 1906–07
- Symphony No. 2 (Raff) in C major (Op. 140) by Joachim Raff, 1866
- Symphony No. 2 (Rautavaara) by Einojuhani Rautavaara, 1957/1984
- Symphony No. 2 (Rimsky-Korsakov) (Op. 9, Antar) by Nikolai Rimsky-Korsakov, 1868
- Symphony No. 2 (Rochberg) by George Rochberg, 1955–56
- Symphony No. 2 (Rouse) by Christopher Rouse, 1994
- Symphony No. 2 (Roussel) in B♭ major (Op. 23) by Albert Roussel, 1919–21
- Symphony No. 2 (Rubbra) in D (Op. 45) by Edmund Rubbra
- Symphony No. 2 (Saint-Saëns) in A minor (Op. 55) by Camille Saint-Saëns, 1859
- Symphony No. 2 (Saygun) (Op. 30) by Ahmed Adnan Saygun, 1958
- Symphony No. 2 (Say) (Op. 38, Mesopotamia) by Fazıl Say, 2011
- Symphony No. 2 (Scherber) in F minor by Martin Scherber, 1951–52
- Symphony No. 2 (Schmidt) in E♭ major by Franz Schmidt, 1911–13
- Symphony No. 2 (Schnittke) (St. Florian, Invisible Mass) by Alfred Schnittke, 1979
- Symphony No. 2 (Schubert) in B♭ major (D. 125) by Franz Schubert, 1814–15
- Symphony No. 2 (Schumann) in C major (Op. 61) by Robert Schumann, 1845–47
- Symphony No. 2 (Scriabin) in C minor (Op. 29) by Alexander Scriabin, 1901
- Symphony No. 2 (Sessions) by Roger Sessions, 1944–46
- Symphony No. 2 (Shostakovich) in B major (To October) by Dmitri Shostakovich, 1927
- Symphony No. 2 (Sibelius) in D major (Op. 43) by Jean Sibelius, 1901–02
- Symphony No. 2 (Simpson) by Robert Simpson, 1956
- Symphony No. 2 (Spohr) in D minor (Op. 49) by Louis Spohr, 1820
- Symphony No. 2 (Strauss) in F minor (Op. 12, TrV 126) by Richard Strauss, 1883–84
- Symphony No. 2 (Suk) in C minor (Op. 27, Asrael) by Josef Suk, 1905–06
- Symphony No. 2 (Svendsen) in B♭ major (Op. 15) by Johan Svendsen, 1874
- Symphony No. 2 (Szymanowski) in B♭ major (Op. 19) by Karol Szymanowski, 1909–10
- Symphony No. 2 (Tchaikovsky), in C minor (Op. 17, Little Russian) by Pyotr Ilyich Tchaikovsky, 1872
- Symphony No. 2 (Tippett) by Michael Tippett, 1956–57
- Symphony No. 2 (Ustvolskaya) (True and Eternal Bliss) by Galina Ustvolskaya, 1979
- Symphony No. 2 (Vaughan Williams) (A London Symphony) by Ralph Vaughan Williams, 1913, rev. 1920
- Symphony No. 2 (Villa-Lobos) (Ascensão) by Heitor Villa-Lobos, 1917–44
- Symphony No. 2 (Walton) by William Walton, 1957
- Symphony No. 2 (Weber) in C major (J. 51) by Carl Maria von Weber, 1807
- Symphony No. 2 (Weill) by Kurt Weill, 1934
- Symphony No. 2 (Wellesz) (Op. 65 The English) by Egon Wellesz, 1947–48
- Symphony No. 2 (Wetz) in A major (Op. 47) by Richard Wetz, 1921
- Symphony No. 2 (Williamson) (Pilgrim på Havet) by Malcolm Williamson, 1968
- Symphony No. 2 (Wingate) (Kleetüden) by Jason Wright Wingate, 2009
- Symphony No. 2 (Zemlinsky) in B♭ major by Alexander von Zemlinsky, 1897
