= Symphony No. 3 in C minor =

Symphony No. 3 in C minor may refer to:

- Edgar Bainton's Symphony No. 3 (completed 1956)
- Frederic Hymen Cowen's Symphony No. 3 Scandinavian (1880)
- Edward Elgar's incomplete Symphony No. 3, op. 88.
- Friedrich Gernsheim's Symphony No. 3, op. 54 "Mirjam" (1888)
- Witold Maliszewski's Symphony No. 3, op. 14
- Florence Price's Symphony No. 3 (1940)
- Sergei Prokofiev's Symphony No. 3, op. 44 (1928)
- Julius Röntgen's Symphony No. 3 (1910)
- Camille Saint-Saëns's Symphony No. 3, op. 78 "Organ" (1886)
- Alexander Scriabin's Symphony No. 3, op. 43 "The Divine Poem" (1904)
- Louis Spohr's Symphony No. 3, op. 78 (1828)
- Richard Wüerst's Symphony No. 3 (1861)

== See also ==
- List of symphonies in C minor
