= Op. 67 =

In music, Op. 67 stands for Opus number 67. Compositions that are assigned this number include:

- Beethoven – Symphony No. 5
- Brahms – String Quartet No. 3
- Bruch – Moses
- Chopin – Mazurkas, Op. 67
- Dvořák – Hussite Overture
- Glazunov – The Seasons
- Gottschalk – Grande Tarantelle
- Grieg – Haugtussa
- Liebermann – Symphony No. 2
- Mendelssohn – Songs without Words, Book VI
- Prokofiev – Peter and the Wolf
- Reger – 52 chorale preludes, Op. 67
- Schumann – Romanzen & Balladen volume I (5 partsongs)
- Sibelius – Three Sonatinas, for solo piano (1912)
- Shostakovich – Piano Trio No. 2
- Tchaikovsky – Hamlet
