= Road to paradise =

Road to paradise may refer to:

- Washington State Route 706, also called the Road to Paradise
- Road to Paradise: Anthology 1978–83, a compilation album by British melodic rock band Magnum
- Road to Paradise (film), a 1930 all-talking pre-code drama film
- The Road to Paradise, a 1930 musical comedy film
- The Road to Paradise (1956 film), a 1956 French-German romantic comedy film

== See also ==
- Paradise Road (disambiguation)
