= Paradise Road =

Paradise Road may refer to:

- Paradise Road (1936 film), a film directed by Martin Frič
- Paradise Road (1997 film), a film directed by Bruce Beresford
- Paradise Road (Las Vegas), a road in Las Vegas
- "Paradise Road" (song), a 1980 song by South African group Joy
