= List of symphonies in C minor =

This is a list of symphonies in C minor written by notable composers.

Composer	Symphony
Hugo Alfvén	Symphony No. 4 "Från havsbandet", Op. 39 (1918–19)
Boris Arapov	Symphony No. 1 (1947)
Thomas Arne	Symphony No. 4 (ca. 1767)
Edgar Bainton	Symphony No. 3 (1952–56)
Ludwig van Beethoven	Symphony No. 5, Op. 67 (1804–08)
Felix Blumenfeld	Symphony in C minor "To the Dear Beloved", Op. 39 (ca. 1907)
Luigi Boccherini	Symphony Op. 41 G. 519 (1788)
Johannes Brahms	Symphony No. 1, Op. 68 (1855–76)
Havergal Brian	Symphony No. 10 (1953–54); Symphony No. 27 (1966); Symphony No. 28 (1967)
Anton Bruckner	Symphony No. 1 (1865–66, rev 1877, 1884 and 1890); Symphony No. 2 (1871–72, rev 1873, 1876 and 1877); Symphony No. 8 (1884–87, rev 1889–90)
Norbert Burgmüller	Symphony No. 1, Op. 2 (1831–33)
Antonio Casimir Cartellieri	Symphony No. 1 (1795)
Alfredo Casella	Symphony No. 2, Op. 12 (1908–09)
Frederic Cliffe	Symphony No. 1 (1889)
Frederic Hymen Cowen	Symphony No. 1 (1869); Symphony No. 3 "Scandinavian" (1880)
Carl Czerny	Symphony No. 1 "Grand Symphony", Op. 781
Antonín Dvořák	Symphony No. 1 "The Bells of Zlonice", B. 9 (1865)
Edward Elgar	Symphony No. 3, Op. 88 (1932–34, completed in 1997 by Anthony Payne)
Louise Farrenc	Symphony No. 1, Op. 32 (1841)
Josef Bohuslav Foerster	Symphony No. 4 "Easter Eve", Op. 54 (1905)
Niels Gade	Symphony No. 1, Op. 5 (1842)
Friedrich Gernsheim	Symphony No. 3 "Mirjam", Op. 54 (1888)
Louis Glass	Symphony No. 2, Op. 28 (1899)
Alexander Glazunov	Symphony No. 6, Op. 58 (1896)
Reinhold Glière	Symphony No. 2, Op. 25 (1907–08)
Edvard Grieg	Symphony in C minor, EG 119 (1863–64)
Johan Halvorsen	Symphony No. 1 (1923)
Asger Hamerik	Symphony in C minor, Op. 3 (1860, lost); Symphony No. 2 "Symphonie tragique", Op. 32 (1882–83)
Joseph Haydn	Symphony No. 52 (1771–72); Symphony No. 78 (1782); Symphony No. 95 (1791)
William Herschel	Symphony No. 8 (1761)
Heinrich von Herzogenberg	Symphony in C minor, WoO 29 (1878); Symphony No. 1, Op. 50 (1884)
Richard Hol	Symphony No. 1 (1863)
Jānis Ivanovs	Symphony No. 7 (1953)
Salomon Jadassohn	Symphony No. 4, Op. 101 (1889)
Dmitry Kabalevsky	Symphony No. 2, Op. 19 (1934); Symphony No. 4, Op. 54 (1956)
Hugo Kaun	Symphony No. 2, Op. 85 (1908)
Tikhon Khrennikov	Symphony No. 2, Op. 9 (1940, rev. 1942)
August Klughardt	Symphony No. 4 Op. 57 (1890); Symphony No. 5, Op. 71 (1892–97, orchestration of his lost String Sextet in C sharp minor)
Joseph Martin Kraus	Symphony in C minor, VB 142 (a reworking of the Symphony in C-sharp minor, VB 140); Symphonie funèbre in C minor
Franz Krommer	Symphony No. 4, Op. 102 (1819–20)
Joseph Küffner	Symphony No. 4, Op. 141 (published 1823)
Franz Lachner	Symphony No. 5 "Passionata", Op. 52 (1835)
Albéric Magnard	Symphony No. 1, Op. 4 (1889–90)
Gustav Mahler	Symphony No. 2 "Resurrection" (1888–94)
Witold Maliszewski	Symphony No. 3, op. 14 (1907? published 1912)
Daniel Gregory Mason	Symphony No. 1, Op. 11 (1913–14)
Felix Mendelssohn	Symphony No. 1, Op. 11 (1824)
Nikolai Myaskovsky	Symphony No. 1, Op. 3 (1908, rev. 1921); Symphony No. 27, Op. 85 (1947–49)
John Knowles Paine	Symphony No. 1, Op. 23 (1872–75)
Boris Parsadanian	Symphony No. 1 "To the Memory of the 26 Commissars of Baku", Op. 5 (1958)
Ignaz Pleyel	Symphony, Benton 121 (1778); Symphony, Benton 142 (1789)
Florence Price	Symphony No. 3 (1938–40)
Sergei Prokofiev	Symphony No. 3, Op. 44 (1928)
Carl Reinecke	Symphony No. 2 "Hakon Jarl", Op. 134 (1874–75, rev. 1888)
Franz Xaver Richter	Symphony, Riemann 13 (ca. 1740); Sinfonia "Number 12" (published 1759)
Ferdinand Ries	Symphony No. 2, Op. 80 (1814)
Julius Röntgen	Symphony No. 3 (1910); Symphony No. 6 "Rijck God, wie sal ic claghen" (1928); Symphony No. 19 "über B.A.C.H." (1931); Symphony No. 20 "Prooemion. Mit Schlußchor über Goethe's Prooemion" (1931); Symphony No. 23 (1932)
Camille Saint-Saëns	Symphony No. 3 "Organ Symphony", Op. 78 (1886)
Xaver Scharwenka	Symphony, Op. 60 (1882)
Ernest Schelling	Symphony in C minor (1903)
Franz Schubert	Symphony No. 4 "Tragic", D. 417 (1816)
Alexander Scriabin	Symphony No. 2, Op. 29 (1901); Symphony No. 3 "Le Divin Poème", Op. 43 (1902–04)
Dmitri Shostakovich	Symphony No. 4, Op. 43 (1935–36); Symphony No. 8, Op. 65 (1943)
Alice Mary Smith	Symphony No. 1 (1863)
Louis Spohr	Symphony No. 3, Op. 78 (1828); Symphony No. 5, Op. 102 (1837)
Josef Suk	Symphony No. 2 "Asrael", Op. 27 (1904–06)
Sergei Taneyev	Symphony No. 4, Op. 12 (1896–98)
Pyotr Ilyich Tchaikovsky	Symphony No. 2 "Little Russian", Op. 17 (1872, rev. 1879–80)
Eduard Tubin	Symphony No. 1, ETW 1 (1931–34)
Johann Baptist Wanhal	Symphony, Bryan c1; Symphony, Bryan c2 (by 1772)
Felix Weingartner	Symphony No. 5, Op. 71 (1926)
Richard Wetz	Symphony No. 1, op. 40 (1915–16)
Christoph Ernst Friedrich Weyse	Symphony No. 6, DF 122 (1798)
Johann Wilhelm Wilms	Symphony No. 4, Op. 23 (c. 1812); Symphony No. 7 (c. 1836)
Felix Woyrsch	Symphony No. 1, Op. 52 (1908)
Paul Wranitzky	Symphony, Op. 11 No. 1(c. 1781); Symphony "La Paix", Op.31 (c. 1797)
Richard Wüerst	Symphony No. 3, Op. 38 (1862)
