= Heinrich Hofmann (composer) =

German musician

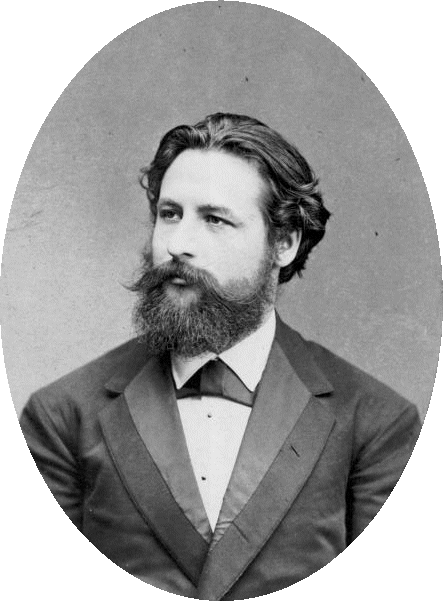
Heinrich Hofmann

Heinrich Karl Johann Hofmann (13 January 1842, Berlin – 16 July 1902, Groß-Tabarz, present-day Thuringia) was a German composer and pianist. He was a pupil of Theodor Kullak, Eduard Grell, Siegfried Dehn and Richard Wüerst. His Frithjof Symphony (1874), a musical realization of the legend Friðþjófs saga hins frœkna, was one of the most frequently performed orchestral works in Germany during the late 19th century. In addition to orchestral music, he also wrote several operas, some lieder, choral music, and works for solo piano. After his death, his music fell largely into obscurity. He was not a very famous composer in his time. Hofmann lived during the late 19th century, around near the 20th century.
