= Joy (South African band) =

Vocal group from South Africa

Joy was a South African female vocal group, who had a charts-topping hit in South Africa in 1980 with "Paradise Road". The record spent nine weeks at the No. 1 spot, and went on to become considered an unofficial South African anthem. Felicia Marion, Thoko Ndlozi and Anneline Malebo joined forces in 1979 and proceeded to set South African stages alight with colourful and fiery performances. They were very successful in the South African charts as well.

Prior to their forming, each singer led a solo career. Thoko Ndlozi had appeared in a couple of Gibson Kente's productions, Zwi and Sikalo, and had sung with the Uncle Joe Rhythm Cabins. Felicia Marion did backing vocals for Sammy Brown and toured the country with the Sound Black Shows. Anneline Malebo toured with the Rockets and recorded two solo singles: "Let's Live Together" (1976) and "Love The Way You Love" (1977). Brenda Fassie sang with Joy for a short period, filling in for Anneline Malebo who was on maternity leave.

Joy have supported Lamont Dozier, Timmy Thomas, Clarence Carter and Dobie Gray on their South African tours, and Leo Sayer at Sun City. The trio also held a lengthy singing-recording relationship with Spirits Rejoice. Joy won two SARIE Awards for Best Vocal Group and Best English LP of the Year in 1980. They broke up in 1983.

Anneline Malebo died in the Somerset Hospital, Cape Town in 2002 at the age of 48.

== Discography ==
=== Singles ===
Year	Title
1978	"Devil With Angel Eyes"
1979	"The Click Song"
1980	"Ain't Gonna Stop... 'Til I Get To The Top"
1980	"Paradise Road"
1981	"Love Chain Reaction"
1982	"State of Independence"

=== Albums ===
- 1980 - Paradise Road
- 1981 - High Life
