= 1980 Country Music Association Awards =

Annual US music awards ceremony

- Date: October 13, 1980
- Location: Grand Ole Opry House, Nashville, Tennessee
- Hosted by: Mac Davis; Barbara Mandrell
- Most wins: George Jones (2)
- Most nominations: Kenny Rogers; Charlie Daniels Band; Larry Gatlin & The Gatlin Brothers (4 each)

Television/radio coverage
- Network: CBS

The 1980 Country Music Association Awards, 14th Ceremony, was held on October 13, 1980, at the Grand Ole Opry House, Nashville, Tennessee, and was hosted by CMA Award winners Mac Davis and Barbara Mandrell.

== Winners and nominees ==
Winners in Bold.

Entertainer of the Year	Album of the Year
**Barbara Mandrell**; Charlie Daniels Band; Larry Gatlin & The Gatlin Brothers; Willie Nelson; Kenny Rogers	**Coal Miner's Daughter (Original Motion Pict. Soundtrack) — Various Artists**; Just Good Ol' Boys — Joe Stampley and Moe Bandy; Kenny — Kenny Rogers; Roses In The Snow — Emmylou Harris; There's A Little Bit Of Hank In Me — Charley Pride
Male Vocalist of the Year	Female Vocalist of the Year
**George Jones**; John Conlee; Willie Nelson; Kenny Rogers; Don Williams	**Emmylou Harris**; Crystal Gayle; Loretta Lynn; Barbara Mandrell; Anne Murray
Vocal Group of the Year	Vocal Duo of the Year
**Statler Brothers**; Alabama; Charlie Daniels Band; Larry Gatlin & The Gatlin Brothers; Oak Ridge Boys	**Moe Bandy and Joe Stampley**; Conway Twitty and Loretta Lynn; George Jones and Tammy Wynette; Janie Fricke and Johnny Duncan; Jim Ed Brown and Helen Cornelius
Single of the Year	Song of the Year
**"He Stopped Loving Her Today" — George Jones**; "All The Gold In California" — Larry Gatlin & The Gatlin Brothers; "Coward Of The County" — Kenny Rogers; "Good Ole Boys Like Me" — Don Williams; "In America" — Charlie Daniels Band	**"He Stopped Loving Her Today" — Bobby Braddock and Curly Putman**; "Coward Of The County" — Billy Edd Wheeler and Roger Bowling; "Good Ole Boys Like Me" — Bob McDill; "In America" — Charlie Daniels, John Thomas Crain, William Joe DiGregorio, Fred Edwards, Charles Hayward and James Marshall; "You Decorated My Life" — Bob Morrison and Debbie Hupp
Instrumental Group of the Year	Instrumentalist of the Year
**Charlie Daniels Band**; Alabama; Asleep At The Wheel; Larry Gatlin & The Gatlin Brothers; Oak Ridge Boys Band	**Roy Clark**; Chet Atkins; Floyd Cramer; Johnny Gimble; Charlie McCoy

== Hall of Fame ==
Country Music Hall of Fame Inductees
- Johnny Cash
- Connie B. Gay
- Sons of the Pioneers
