= Köppäbävisan =

Single by Bengt Pegefelt
- A-side: "Köppäbävisan"
- B-side: "Popsnörerock"
- Released: 1980
- Genre: Pop
- Label: Mas media
- Songwriter: Bengt Pegefelt

"Köppäbävisan" is a song written and recorded by Bengt Pegefelt, released as a single in 1980, scoring a major hit in Sweden topping the Swedish singles chart between 8 May-5 June 1981. The song also charted at Svensktoppen for 10 weeks between 5 April-14 June (in a time when no song was allowed to chart longer than 10 weeks), and even topped the chart.

Written in Borlänge Dialect, the lyrics deal with a person threatening to jump into the Dal River if not getting a sausage.

In 1981, the song was recorded by Curt Haagers on the album Santa Maria, and also for the children's album, Smurfarnas bästa.

== Charts ==
Chart (1981)	Peak position
Sweden	1
