= Symphony No. 2 (Penderecki) =

Symphony by Krzysztof Penderecki

- ("Christmas")
- by Krzysztof Penderecki
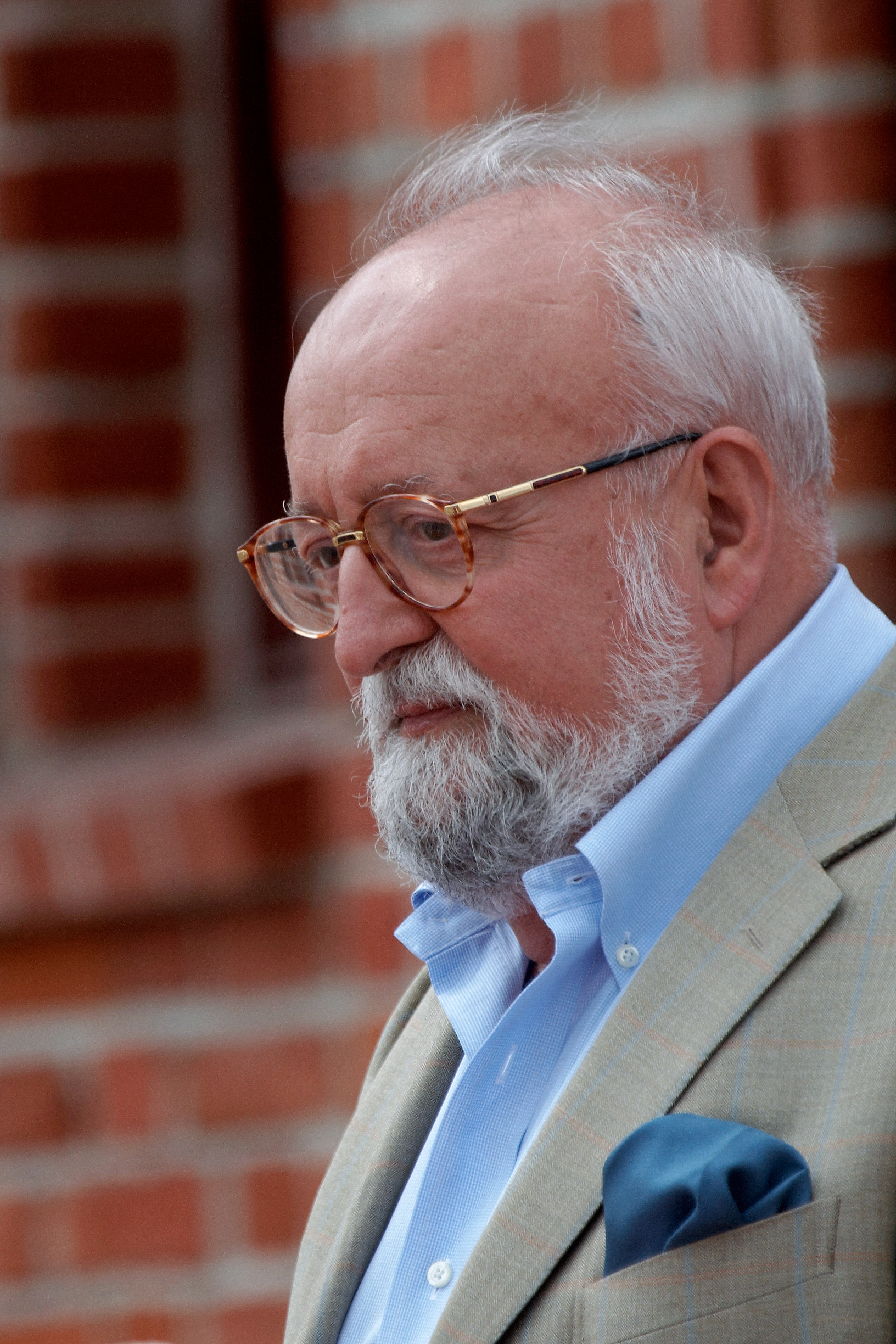
- The composer in 2008
- Composed: 1979–80
- Performed: 1 May 1980, New York
- Duration: 30 min.
- Movements: 1
- Scoring: orchestra

Polish composer Krzysztof Penderecki wrote his Symphony No. 2 during the winter of 1979–80. Sometimes referred to as the "Christmas Symphony" (the opening phrase from the Christmas carol "Silent Night" occurs three times during the symphony), neither the score nor the parts (Schott Music, Mainz 45 791) make any reference to this moniker.

The New York Philharmonic, conducted by Zubin Mehta, gave the first performance of the symphony on 1 May 1980.

== Music ==
The symphony, lasting 30–35 minutes, is in one movement employing a modified sonata form. Sections are marked: Moderato, Allegretto, Lento, Tempo I and Allegretto.

It is scored for piccolo, 2 flutes, 2 oboes, cor anglais, 3 clarinets (3rd doubling E♭ clarinet and bass clarinet), 2 bassoons, contrabassoon, 5 horns, 3 trumpets, 3 trombones, tuba, timpani, percussion (4 performers: triangle, gong, cymbals, tamtam, snare drum, bass drum, tubular bells, glockenspiel, xylophone), celesta, and strings

== Recordings ==
| Orchestra | Conductor | Record company | Year of Recording | Format |
|---|---|---|---|---|
| National Polish Radio Symphony Orchestra of Katowice (Polskie Radio. Wielka Orkiestra Symfoniczna w Katowicach) | Jacek Kasprzyk | Muza | 1981 | LP |
| Norddeutscher Rundfunk. Sinfonie-Orchester | Krzysztof Penderecki | Wergo | 1994 | CD |
| National Polish Radio Symphony Orchestra (Katowice) | Antoni Wit | Naxos Records | 2000 | CD |
| Sinfonia Varsovia | Krzysztof Penderecki | Warner Classics | 2017 | CD |
