= Richard Wüerst =

German composer, music professor and pedagogue

Richard Wüerst (22 February 1824 – 9 October 1881) was a German composer, music professor and pedagogue.

Wüerst was born and died in Berlin. He was a pupil of Carl Friedrich Rungenhagen at the Prussian Academy of Arts and a pupil of Felix Mendelssohn's. He later taught in the conservatory of Theodor Kullak (what would soon become the Stern Conservatory) and edited the Neue Berliner Musikzeitung (from 1874 to 1875). One of his notable students was Heinrich Hofmann. See: List of music students by teacher: T to Z#Richard Wüerst.

== Selected works ==
=== Operas ===
- Der Rotmantel (1848 Berlin)
- Vineta (21 December 1862, Bratislava)
- Die Gastspielreise, Dramatisch-musikalischer Scherz en un acte (after Adolf von Winterfeld). Publié à Berlin: Bloch, ca. 1868.
- Faublas, comic opera in three acts, after a Jean-Baptiste Louvet de Couvray, libretto by Ernst Wichert (1873 Berlin)
- A-ing-fo-hi, comic opera in three acts, after a story by Anton Giulio Barrili, libretto by Ernst Wichert (28 January 1878, Berlin)
- Die Offiziere der Kaiserin (1878 Berlin)
- Der Stern von Turan

=== Symphonies ===
- Three symphonies (including opus 21 in F, second symphony opus 54(2?) in D minor and opus 36 in C minor, no. 3)
- A concerto for violin, op. 37

=== Instrumental music ===
- Russian Suite for Strings, op. 81
- Three string quartets, op.33 (A minor, D major, G major)

== Sources ==
- Chrysander, Friedrich and Müller, Joseph. Allgemeine musikalische Zeitung at Google Books. Knuf. Volume 2, 9 Mar. 1864 issue.
- Opera Glass
- Wüerst, Richard Ferdinand; Butler, Maynard, trans. (1893) Elementary Theory of Music, and the Treatment of Chords at Google Books. 5th edition. Boston Music Company.
