= Paradise Road (song) =

Song by Patric van Blerk and Fransua Roos

"Paradise Road" is a song written in 1979 by Patric van Blerk and Fransua Roos. Recorded in 1980 by the South African female vocal group Joy, which comprised Felicia Marion, Thoko Ndlozi and Anneline Malebo, the song topped the hit parade for nine weeks. "Paradise Road" went on to become an unofficial South African anthem: "The lyrics resonated with the country at that time, the chorus being: There are better days before us and a burning bridge behind, fire smoking, the sky is blazing. There’s a woman waiting, weeping and a young man nearly beaten, all for love. Paradise was almost closing down."

Interviewed in 2014 as the last surviving member of the group, Felicia Marion when asked about her fondest memory of performing the song with Joy said: "There were so many. I think it was the first night we performed Paradise Road. I think it was in Sharpeville. It had never been heard before. As the first three chords were strummed the crowd went crazy. I was so surprised because the first time I heard the song I thought it was boring.... Paradise Road was a song of hope and a lot of people received it as a prophetic word."

A cover version of the song was made by Ladysmith Black Mambazo with Timothy Moloi.
