= Symphony No. 2 (Liebermann) =

Symphony by Lowell Liebermann

Lowell Liebermann’s Symphony No. 2, Op. 67 (1999) is a symphony for large orchestra and SATB chorus, with texts adapted from the poetry of Walt Whitman. It is about 40 minutes long, and arranged into four movements to be played without a break. It was commissioned by Ford Lacy and Cece Smith for the Dallas Symphony Orchestra and Chorus’ centennial celebration.

The work was premiered in 2000, with Andrew Litton conducting the Dallas Symphony Orchestra and Chorus. The Second Symphony was very favorably received at its premiere, with TIME describing it as, "Now brazen and glittering, now radiantly visionary...the work of a composer unafraid of grand gestures and openhearted lyricism."

However, the symphony has since received harsh criticism due to its exceptionally free embrace of tonality and its distinctly optimistic outlook. Scott Cantrell in particular has denounced the Second Symphony as "foolhardy" in the "cynical" environment of today. The Second Symphony was recorded in 2000 on the Delos International label with Andrew Litton conducting the Dallas Symphony Orchestra and Chorus.
