= Symphony No. 2 (Davies) =

- by Peter Maxwell Davies
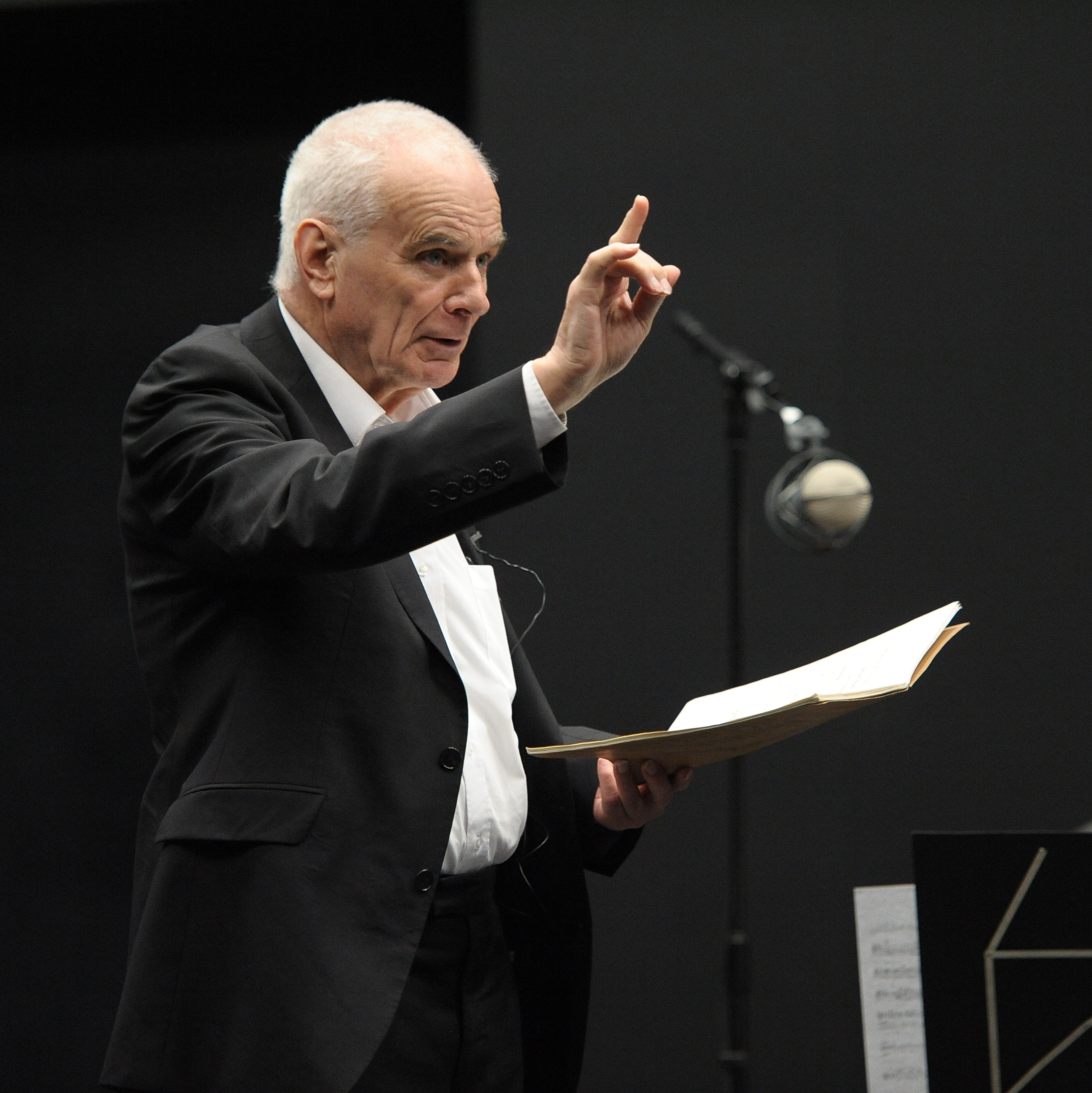
- The composer in 2012
- Key: B minor
- Occasion: Centenary of the Boston Symphony Orchestra
- Recorded: 1993
- Movements: 4

Premiere
- Date: 26 February 1981
- Location: Symphony Hall, Boston
- Conductor: Seiji Ozawa
- Performers: Boston Symphony Orchestra

The Symphony No. 2 by Peter Maxwell Davies was commissioned by the Boston Symphony Orchestra in celebration of its centenary, and was composed in 1980. Seiji Ozawa conducted the world premiere with the BSO on 26 February 1981 at Symphony Hall, Boston. The same forces performed the New York premiere on 4 March that year at Carnegie Hall.

== Character and materials ==
The symphony is in B minor, though the key does not figure in the title and the tonality is not entirely conventional. It has been characterised as "focused atonality ... a new tonality without neo-classicism". For example, instead of the usual dominant, F♯, throughout the symphony Davies uses E♯, a semitone lower and a tritone above the tonic—a technique used earlier by Bartók in the first movement of his Music for Strings, Percussion and Celesta. An additional unifying element used throughout the work is the plainsong "Nativitas tua, Dei Genitrix", a chant for the birthday of the Virgin Mary, which also happens to be the composer's birthday.

The symphony has been characterised as Davies's La Mer, and compared, both in quality and in structure, to Vaughan Williams's Sixth Symphony.

== Instrumentation ==
The symphony is scored for two flutes, piccolo (doubling alto flute), two oboes, two clarinets, bass clarinet, two bassoons, double bassoon, four horns, three trumpets, two trombones, timpani, glockenspiel, crotales, marimba, harp, and strings.

== Analysis ==
The symphony is in four movements, corresponding loosely to the traditional symphony plan:

1. Allegro molto – Allegro
2. Adagio
3. Allegro molto, leggiero
4. Adagio, flessibile – Poco più mosso – Più mosso – Moderato – Allegro

The first movement begins with an introduction presenting all of the germ cells used in the entire symphony. This is followed by a sonata-allegro, in which the usual development is replaced by a succession of transformation processes. The second movement is in the tritone-related key of F minor. A slow theme in the cellos, presenting "an almost Elgarian demeanour" is followed by four variations—called "doubles" by the composer—for bassoon, horn, oboe, and trumpet.

The third movement resembles a scherzo and trio, and is in F major.

The final movement returns to the tonal centre of B. It begins as a passacaglia, recalling the finale of Brahms's Fourth Symphony only of a more episodic nature. However, it gradually evolves, first into a character similar to the first movement, and then into the manner of a traditional symphonic finale.

== Discography ==
- Peter Maxwell Davies: Symphony No. 2. BBC Philharmonic, Peter Maxwell Davies (cond.). Recorded Studio 7, New Broadcasting House, Manchester, September. 1993. CD recording. Collins Classics 14032. [St Mary Cray, Orpington, Kent]: Lambourne Productions, 1994. Reissued as part of Peter Maxwell Davies: Symphony No. 2 / St. Thomas Wake. CD recording and MP3 download. Naxos 8572349. [N.p.]: Naxos, 2012.
