= Symphony No. 2 (Scriabin) =

1901 symphony by Alexander Scriabin

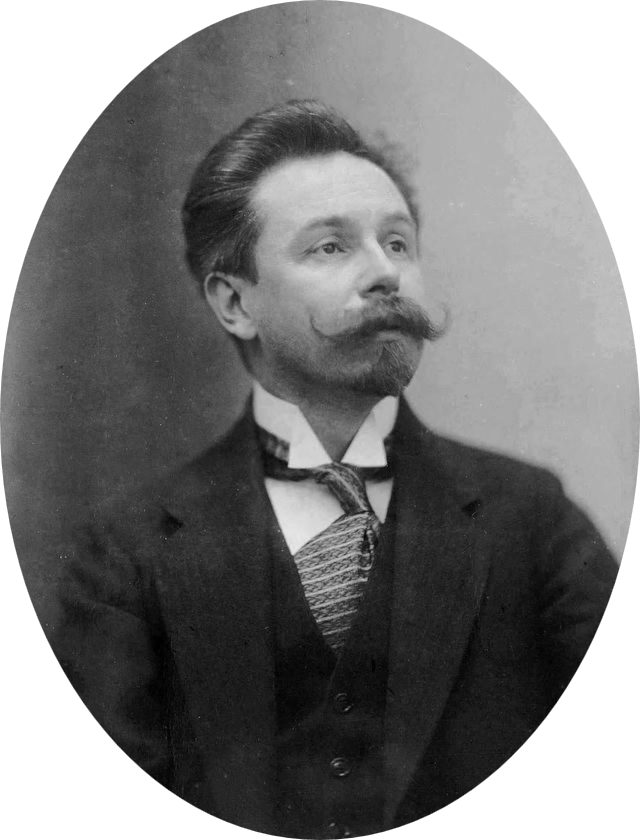
Scriabin in 1900

Alexander Scriabin's Symphony No. 2, Op. 29, in C minor was written in 1901 and first performed in St. Petersburg under Anatol Lyadov on 12 January 1902.

== Structure ==
The second symphony is the most structurally conventional of all Scriabin's symphonies. However, it features extensive thematic transformation establishing a cyclic link between its movements. The sombre initial theme of the first movement is developed to a triumphant hymn functioning as the main subject of the finale.

The symphony consists of five movements, although the first two and the final two are connected to each other without a break:

1. Andante (C minor)
2. Allegro (E♭ major)
3. Andante (B major)
4. Tempestoso (F minor)
5. Maestoso (C major)

== Reception ==
When Vassily Safonoff first conducted Scriabin's Second Symphony (which he did in Moscow sometime between 1902 and 1903), he waved the score at the orchestra and said, "Here is the new Bible, gentlemen..."
