= The Square, Harlow =

Coordinates: 51°46′15″N 0°05′22″E

The Square was a 250 capacity independent live music venue in Harlow, Essex, England. It was managed by SquareOne Entertainment LLP who took over the venue in July 2008. After a five-month closure period from the end of 2015, The Square re-opened on Friday, 10 June 2016 before closing permanently in early 2017.

In the early 2000s, ECC and Venue staff were informed of landlords of their intention to redevelop the site. In 2004/2005 and short lease extension occurred, with a number of others and development was delayed.

Prior to 2008 it was run by Essex County Council until funding was withdrawn and the venue was closed after over 35 years of service as a community resource.

The Square was one of the starting places for acts including Enter Shikari, George Ezra, and The Subways. Harlow bands Collapsed Lung and Morning Parade formed at the venue. Cornershop name the venue as the gig that got them signed, as well as being the first venue to pay them to play. BBC DJ Steve Lamacq broadcast a live Coldplay show from the venue in 2000.

The Square comedy club played host to Jack Dee, Eddie Izzard, Jo Brand, Phill Jupitus, Terry Alderton and was regularly hosted by John Mann.

In 2012, a live recording by the band Seymour (later Blur) from 1989 was included in the Blur 21 box set.

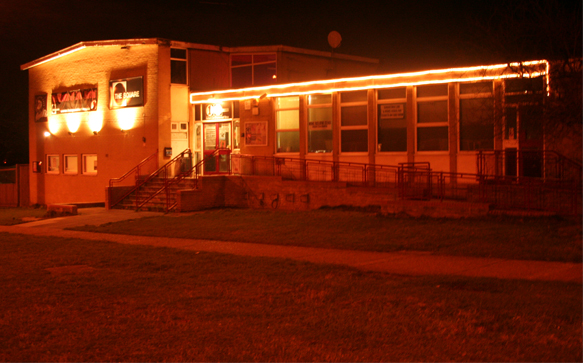
Outside view of The Square

In May 2015, building owners Circle Housing announced plans for redevelopment of the site.

In July 2015, a series of gigs under the banner 'Back To Square One' was announced, with big-name acts coming back to play the venue one last time. The series includes Newtown Neurotics, The Members, Steve Harris British Lion, Buzzcocks, DragonForce, InMe, King Prawn, Attila The Stockbroker, John Otway, The Beat, Nine Below Zero, Eddie & The Hot Rods, Collapsed Lung, Gaz Coombes, Chas & Dave, and Secret Affair.

In October 2015, The Square was shortlisted for NME magazine's 'Britain's Best Small Venue' competition.

The Square finally closed on the morning of 31 January 2017, with the final band playing the venue on Saturday 28th, being long standing Essex band Eddie & The Hot Rods. Hot Rods guitarist Richard Holgarth, was also a member of the SquareOne Entertainment Partnership and the Technical Manager of the venue.

For more than a decade, the partnership knew the tenancy was finite. Yet during the period of independent operation, it failed to accumulate the capital necessary to secure and develop a new premises. The accounts, listed at Companies House, show a business with modest net assets, not one generating the surplus required for strategic reinvestment.

A further consideration is the venue’s business model. A room of roughly 250–300 capacity inherently limits revenue ceiling and scalability. In a market without the advantages of a substantial student population or similarly dense youth demographic, repeat demand may have been harder to sustain. Industry trends also shifted over time, with greater emphasis on larger, higher-yield venues and digital audience-building through social media, potentially weakening the position of smaller grassroots spaces.It remains to be seen whether The Square would have survived the Pandemic.

Some years later, it was finally demolished.

Unfortunately, the land where the venue was still remains undeveloped.
