= Neighbor of the Beast =

Neighbor of the Beast or Neighbour of the Beast may refer to any of a number of concepts related to a number near 666, the Number of the Beast

== 667 ==
- 667.. The Neighbour of the Beast, an album by Wig Wam
- 667 Dark Avenue, a 66-story building in the 6th installment of the novel series A Series of Unfortunate Events
- "667 (The Neighbour of the Beast)", a song by The Selecter on the album String Theory
- 667, Neighbor of the Beast, a 2006 film by Brain Damage Films

== 668 ==
- 668, the Neighbor of the Beast, a book by Lionel Fenn
- "668:The Neighbour Of The Beast", a song by Richard Holgarth
- 668: Neighbour of the Beast, an album by Attila the Stockbroker
