= Live at Newcastle =

Live at Newcastle / Live in Newcastle

Live album by the Damned
- Released: 1983 (LP), January 1994 (CD)
- Recorded: 14 October 1982
- Venue: Mayfair Suite, Newcastle upon Tyne, UK
- Genre: Punk rock
- Label: Damned Records (1983), Receiver Records (1994)

The Damned chronology
Strawberries (1982)	Live at Newcastle / Live in Newcastle (1983)	Phantasmagoria (1985)

"Live at Newcastle" (a.k.a. "Live in Newcastle") is a live album by the Damned, released in 1983.

The album was recorded at Newcastle's Mayfair rock club, and features material from the band's albums up to and including Strawberries, which was released in the month this was recorded (October 1982).

== Personnel ==
The Damned

- Dave Vanian – vocals
- Captain Sensible – guitar, vocals
- Paul Gray – bass guitar
- Roman Jugg – keyboards, vocals
- Rat Scabies – drums

== Track listing ==
1. "Ignite"
2. "Disco Man"
3. "Generals"
4. "Bad Time for Bonzo"
5. "Dozen Girls"
6. "Love Song"
7. "Smash It Up (part 1)"
8. "Smash It Up (part 2)"
9. "Looking at You"
10. "New Rose"
