= Gordon Smith Guitars =

Guitar manufacturer

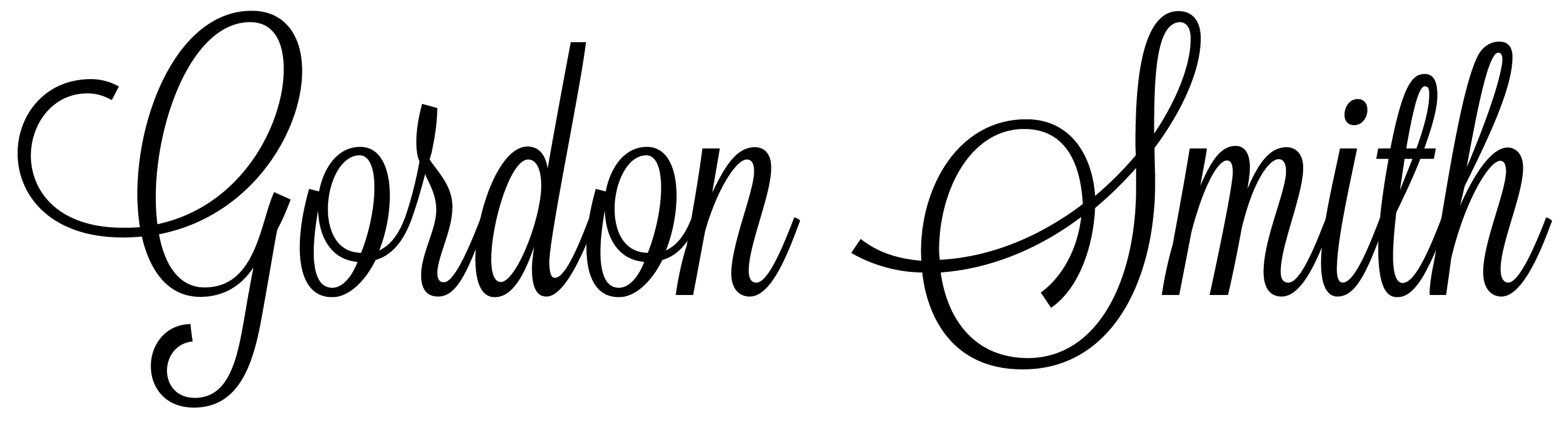
- Industry: Musical instrument
- Founded: 1974; 52 years ago in Partington, Greater Manchester
- Founder: Gordon Whitham and John Smith
- Headquarters: Higham Ferrers, Northamptonshire, England
- Products: Electric guitars
- Parent: Auden Guitars
- Website: gordonsmithguitars.com

Gordon Smith Guitars is an English manufacturer of "hand-made" electric guitars.

== History ==
The company was founded in 1974 and is named after its founders, Gordon Whitham and John Smith. In April 2015 Gordon Smith Guitars was acquired by British-based Auden Guitars and production moved from Partington near Manchester, England to Audens Guitars' workshop in Higham Ferrers, Northamptonshire.

The company aims to produce quality guitars for working musicians and say that they make "guitars, not furniture".

Gordon Smith Guitars are among the highest-rated manufacturers for use of sustainable woods in guitar construction, according to the Ethical Consumer.

== Range ==
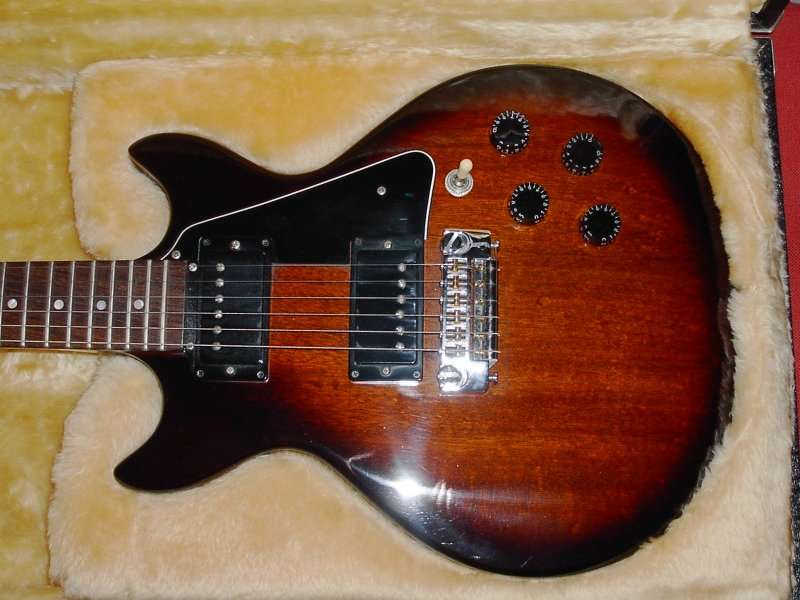
Gordon Smith GSII

The Gordon Smith range includes original designs, such as the Galaxy, as well as S-style, T-style and LP-style models. All models currently use a brass nut.

The company offers many options for customising guitars, including a choice of hardware and finishes, single- or double-cutaway and left- or right-handed guitars. Twelve-string and double-necked versions of the range are also available.

Gordon Smith produce their own pickups in-house.

Their humbucker pickups are coil-tapped as standard for a broader range of sounds.

== Awards ==
Guitarist magazine reviewed the Gordon Smith GS1000 and gave it their Gold award.

== Players ==
The company does not offer celebrity endorsements. Guitarists known to have used Gordon Smith guitars include:

- Mick Abrahams of Jethro Tull and Blodwyn Pig
- Aaron Barrett of Reel Big Fish and The Forces of Evil
- Ian Miles of Creeper
- Rhys Jenkins of The Arteries, Ulrika Spacek and Hot Mass
- Billy Bragg
- Nicky Garratt of U.K. Subs
- Dee Dee Ramone of Ramones
- Kloot Per W of Polyphonic Size and De Lama's
- Pete Shelley of The Buzzcocks
- John Squire of The Stone Roses
- Midge Ure of Thin Lizzy and Ultravox
- James McCreedy of Motion Pictures/Dark Tower/The Biggest Thrill
- Dan Goatham of Spoilers and Snuff
- Members of The Futureheads
- Nicke Andersson of The Hellacopters
- Larry Hibbitt of Hundred Reasons
- Adam Pearson and Mike Varjak of The Sisters Of Mercy
- Frankie Stubbs and Dickie Hammond of Leatherface
- Loz Wong and Simon Wells of Snuff
- James Dean Bradfield of Manic Street Preachers
- Dave Wolfenden of Red Lorry Yellow Lorry
- Paul Kostabi of Psychotica
- Bill McQueen of China Drum
- William McGonagle of Hell Is For Heroes
- JW of Hookworms
- John Otway
- Richard Holgarth of Eddie & the Hot Rods and John Otway Band
- Phillip Foxley
- Richard Tyler formerly of Rosalita
- Ben Wood & Andy Duke of Ben Wood & The Bad Ideas
- Ian Lovell of Guitar Tuition
- Allan Holdsworth
