= Gasoline Days =

Album by Eddie and the Hot Rods

Studio album by Eddie and the Hot Rods
- Released: 1996
- Recorded: May 1995
- Genres: Pub rock, punk rock
- Length: 41:19
- Label: Creative Man
- Producers: Eddie and the Hot Rods, Simon Milton

Eddie and the Hot Rods chronology
Fish 'N' Chips (1981)	Gasoline Days (1996)	Better Late than Never (2005)

Professional ratings
Review scores
Source	Rating
Allmusic	2/5 stars

Gasoline Days is the fifth studio album released by Pub Rock band Eddie and the Hot Rods. It is produced and mixed by the Hot Rods themselves and Simon Milton. In 1992 the 'classic' line-up (Masters, Nichol, Higgs, and Gray) re-grouped for a European tour. Higgs left after the tour, but the band carried on with Steve Walwyn of Dr. Feelgood replacing him. Another Feelgood member, Gordon Russell, was also briefly a member, however, was soon replaced by Mick Rodgers, a former member of Manfred Mann's Earth Band. In 1994 they recorded the album Gasoline Days, released in 1996 by the Japanese label Creative Man. The band has been active intermittently since as the album didn't enjoy much success coupled with relatively poor reviews with one claiming "From teenage depression to mid-life crisis".

== Track listing ==
All songs written by Paul Gray except where noted.

1. "Human Touch" (Paul Gray, Barrie Masters) - 2:46
2. "Emergency" - 4:06
3. "Just Do It" - 4:18
4. "Love Runaway" - 4:01
5. "Love Lies Bleeding" - 3:50
6. "It's Killing Me" - 4:31
7. "(Oh No) What You Gonna Do" - 3:11
8. "Crazy" - 4:38
9. "Gasoline Days" - 2:58
10. "Love Love Love" - 2:44
11. "Alive" - 4:21

== Personnel ==
Eddie and the Hot Rods

- Barrie Masters - vocals
- Paul Gray - bass, backing vocals
- Steve Nicol - drums, backing vocals
- Mick Rogers - guitar, backing vocals
