= Fish 'n' Chips (disambiguation) =

Fish 'n' Chips is a 1981 album by Eddie and the Hot Rods.

Fish 'n' Chips, or variants, may refer to:

- Fish and chips, a popular British dish.
- Fish n' Chips (film), a 2011 British-Cypriot film.
