= Strawberries (album) =

Studio album by The Damned
- Released: October 1982
- Recorded: Mid-1982
- Studios: Rockfield (Monmouth, Wales)
- Genres: Punk rock; gothic rock; psychedelic pop
- Length: 48:12
- Label: Bronze
- Producers: The Damned; Hugh Jones

The Damned chronology
The Black Album (1980)	Strawberries (1982)	Phantasmagoria (1985)

Singles from Strawberries
- 1. "Dozen Girls" Released: 17 September 1982; 2. "Generals" Released: 26 November 1982

Strawberries is the fifth studio album by the English rock band the Damned. It was released in October 1982 by record label Bronze. Limited editions included a strawberry-scented lyric insert. The album reached No. 15 in the UK charts, the band's first to reach the Top 20.

The record was released as the Damned were enjoying a higher public profile, thanks to the solo success of Captain Sensible. Sensible performed lead vocals on "Life Goes On" and "Don't Bother Me". He also introduced new instruments to the band, including sitar, and cello played by his then-girlfriend, Rachael Bor of the pop group Dolly Mixture.

== Background ==
While Strawberries was generally praised for its positive, upbeat melodies, the album marked a time of conflict and division within the band. During the recording, bassist Paul Gray fought with drummer Rat Scabies over management and songwriting responsibilities.

During the recording of the album in 1982, Robert Fripp of King Crimson joined the Damned in the studio. However, the only track they recorded together, "Fun Factory", was left off the album and did not receive any official release until 1990. Fripp also joined the band onstage for a few songs on 11 October 1982 at the Hammersmith Odeon. A bootleg of this concert is available but is of low quality.

The album's working title was Strawberries for Pigs, a name inspired by the reception the band's newer music received from some of their older fans. As Vanian explained, "We were playing a lot of new material, and we had an audience that didn't want to hear about anything, they just wanted to hear 'Neat Neat Neat' and 'New Rose,' nothing else. And they wanted to just smash everything. And they weren't interested in hearing music at all. So at one point, I turned around and said, 'It's like giving strawberries to a fucking pig, this gig, you know?' And that stuck in our minds, and we used it".

Vanian said that the song "The Dog" was inspired by Anne Rice's Interview With The Vampire, explaining, "On reading Anne Rice's Interview with the Vampire in 1976, I penned the song which became known as 'The Dog' but was actually about the strange vampire child Claudia, described in Rice's book. The idea of an adult's mind trapped in a child's body was too fascinating to resist."

As an Easter egg, the band included various sounds at the end of different tracks, including an egg whisk and a pair of jeans being ripped. At the end of the track "Bad Time for Bonzo", a sound of a flushing toilet was used.

== Reception ==
Professional ratings
Review scores
Source	Rating
AllMusic	3.5/5 stars
Sounds	4.5/5 stars

Critics praised the album's musicianship and '60s influences. Writing in Smash Hits, Fred Dellar gave the album 9 out of 10: "The Damned go totally melodic, offer harmony vocals, employ cellos, sitars and brass sections, and even remember to include a lyric sheet. […] This is the kind of pop album Paul McCartney would be pleased to have his moniker on".

In Sounds, Steve Keaton wrote, "Strawberries is the Damned at their most melodic and subversive". He added that the album "manages to indulge both Dave Vanian’s darkly obsessive Gothic vision and the good Captain's psychedelic whims without sacrificing any hard rock sensibilities. Strawberries should be the LP to grant the Damned the recognition they've courted for so long".

Trouser Press described the album as "eclectic and inconsistent but well-produced [...] and boasting some fine tunes", adding, "it shows Sensible's increasing pop prominence [...] and Vanian's willingness to explore a stylistic pallette with no debt to punk". Other critics have noted the album's embrace of psychedelic pop and gothic rock.

In a negative contemporary review, NME called Strawberries "a miserable (w)retch of a record, spewing fourth [sic] enough nauseous 'nostalgia' to fill a book entitled Why The Damned Never Made It, without once touching any spirit. It seems they're doomed to regurgitating their history 'til the aftertaste becomes too bad to bear".

AllMusic's retrospective review was favourable: "By turns sprightly and cheerful, dark and dramatic, energetic and snarling, or all that and more at once, Strawberries defies usual expectations to be yet another good rock album from the band, resisting easy attempts to categorize it".

== Reissue ==
On 7 January 2005, Castle Records re-released Strawberries in the United Kingdom on CD. On October 7, 2022, Iconoclassic Records issued a 40th Anniversary 2 CD Edition of Strawberries remastered by Mark Wilder, including 15 bonus tracks and new liner notes by Jack Rabid of The Big Takeover.

== Track listing ==
Credits adapted from the album's liner notes.

All tracks are written by Rat Scabies, Captain Sensible, Paul Gray and Dave Vanian, except as noted.

No.	Title	Writer(s)	Length
1.	"Ignite"		4:53
2.	"Generals"		3:24
3.	"Stranger on the Town"		5:14
4.	"Dozen Girls"	Scabies, Sensible, Gray, Vanian, Billy Karloff	4:34
5.	"The Dog"		7:25
6.	"Gun Fury (of Riot Forces)"		2:57
7.	"Pleasure and the Pain"		4:23
8.	"Life Goes On"		4:09
9.	"Bad Time for Bonzo"		3:29
10.	"Under the Floor Again"		5:29
11.	"Don't Bother Me"		2:10
Total length:			48:12

Note

Some versions of Strawberries have altered songwriting credits.

=== 2005 deluxe edition ===
- The previously untitled 30-second long instrumental harpsichord piece between track 7 ("Pleasure and the Pain") and track 8 ("Life Goes On") on the original album has been titled "The Missing Link" and given its own track number, track 8, on the deluxe edition.

Bonus tracks
No.	Title	Writer(s)	Length
13.	"Lovely Money (extended version)" (non-album single)	Scabies, Sensible, Gray, Vanian, Randy MacDonald	6:56
14.	"I Think I'm Wonderful" (B-side)	Scabies, Sensible, Gray, Vanian, MacDonald	2:55
15.	"Take That" (B-side)		2:47
16.	"Mine's a Large One Landlord" (B-side)		1:16
17.	"Torture Me" (B-side)		1:24
18.	"Disguise" (B-side)	Sensible, Scabies, Gray, Vanian, Roman Jugg	3:28
19.	"Rat vs. The Omni" (previously unreleased)	Scabies	0:45
20.	"Citadel Zombies" (B-side)	Sensible, Scabies, Gray, Vanian, Jugg	1:58
21.	"Bimbo Jingle" (previously unreleased)	Scabies	0:08
Total length:			69:29

Notes

- Tracks 13 and 14 from the "Lovely Money" single, released June 1982; produced by the Damned and Tony Mansfield; track 13 features spoken word by Viv Stanshall.
- Tracks 15–17 from the "Dozen Girls" single, released September 1982; produced by the Damned.
- Tracks 18 and 20 from the "Generals" single, released November 1982; a Bimbeo Production.

=== 2022 40th Anniversary 2 CD Edition ===
Bonus Disc
No.	Title	Writer(s)	Length
1.	"Fun Factory" (non-album single)	Sensible	4:02
2.	"Lovely Money" (non-album single)	Scabies, Sensible, Gray, Vanian, Randy MacDonald	5:22
3.	"I Think I'm Wonderful" (B-side)	Scabies, Sensible, Gray, Vanian, Jones	2:55
4.	"Lovely Money - Disco Mix" (B-side)	Scabies, Sensible, Gray, Vanian, Randy MacDonald	6:57
5.	"Dozen Girls (7" Version)" (non-album single with alternate lyrics)	Scabies, Sensible, Vanian, Gray, Billy Karloff	3:49
6.	"Take That" (B-side)		2:47
7.	"Mine's a Large One Landlord" (B-side)		1:18
8.	"Torture Me" (B-side)		1:21
9.	"Disguise" (B-side)	Sensible, Scabies, Gray, Vanian, Roman Jugg	3:27
10.	"Citadel Zombies" (B-side, original 7" version first time on CD)	Sensible, Scabies, Gray, Vanian, Roman Jugg	3:19
11.	"Ignite" (live in Newcastle)		5:32
12.	"Disco Man" (live in Newcastle)		2:56
13.	"Generals" (live in Newcastle)		3:14
14.	"Bad Time For Bonzo" (live in Newcastle)		3:36
15.	"Dozen Girls" (live in Newcastle)	Scabies, Sensible, Vanian, Gray, Billy Karloff	3:54
Total length:			54:31

Notes

- Track 1 from the Fun Factory (song) single, released January 1991; produced by Captain Sensible; features guitar by Robert Fripp.
- Tracks 2–4 from the Lovely Money single, released June 1982; produced by the Damned and Tony Mansfield; tracks 2 & 4 feature spoken word by Viv Stanshall.
- Tracks 5–8 from the Dozen Girls single, released September 1982; produced by the Damned.
- Tracks 9 and 10 from the Generals (song) single, released November 1982; a Bimbeo Production.
- Tracks 11–15 recorded live at The Mayfair, Newcastle Upon Tyne, 14 October 1982. From Live at Newcastle album, released November 1983.

== Personnel ==
The Damned

- Dave Vanian – lead vocals (1–7, 9, 10)
- Captain Sensible – guitar, backing and lead (8, 11, 15, 17) vocals, keyboards, sitar (10)
- Paul Gray – bass
- Rat Scabies – drums, synthesizer
- Roman Jugg – keyboard solos

Additional musicians

- Simon Lloyd – brass (2)
- Rachel Bor – cello (7)

Technical

- The Damned – producer (1–11)
- Hugh Jones – co-producer (1, 4, 6–9, 11), engineer
- Dave Vanian – album cover design
- Martin Poole – album cover design
- Linda Roast – album cover concept
- Nigel Greerson – sleeve photography
