= Stuart West (disambiguation) =

Stuart West may refer to:

- Stuart West, evolutionary biologist at the University of Oxford
- Stu West (born 1964), bassist in the English punk band The Damned
- Stewart West (1934–2023), Australian politician
