= Better Late Than Never (Eddie and the Hot Rods album) =

Better Late than Never

Studio album by Eddie and the Hot Rods
- Released: 2004
- Genre: Power pop, pop rock, classic rock
- Length: 49:44
- Label: MSJ Records, Voiceprint

Eddie and the Hot Rods chronology
Get Your Rocks Off (2002)	Better Late than Never (2004)	Been There, Done That... (2006)

Professional ratings
Review scores
Source	Rating
Allmusic	3.5/5 stars

Better Late Than Never is a 2004 album by the band Eddie and the Hot Rods. It was the first album of new material from the current line-up featuring Barrie Masters and was originally released in 2004 on MSJ Records with alternative cover art by Viz comic artist, Simon Thorp.

== Track listing ==
All songs written by Richard Holgarth except where noted.

1. "Bad Time Again" – 3:29
2. "Need Your Touch" – 3:08
3. "Ain't No 9 to 5" – 3:19
4. "Better Without You" – 4:38
5. "Deep Blue Interceptor" – 3:07
6. "I'm Gonna Be Your Man" – 3:32
7. "Sympathy" – 3:40
8. "Not Enough" – 3:58
9. "Bad Man" – 3:08
10. "Shut up and Listen" – 3:45
11. "Once Bitten Twice Shy" (Ian Hunter) – 4:41
12. "High Society" – 3:06
13. "Woolly Bully" (Domingo Samudio) – 3:20
14. "Hard Driving Man" – 2:53

== Personnel ==
Eddie and the Hot Rods

- Barrie Masters – vocals
- Richard Holgarth – guitar, keyboards, backing vocals
- Chris Taylor – guitar, backing vocals
- Simon Bowley – drums, backing vocals
- Dipster Dean – bass guitar, backing vocals
