= Generals (song) =

Song by The Damned

Single by the Damned

from the album Strawberries
- B-side: "Disguise"; "Citadel Zombies"
- Released: November 1982
- Recorded: 1982
- Genre: Punk rock
- Length: 3:24
- Label: Bronze; BRO 159
- Songwriter(s): Scabies; Sensible; Vanian; Gray
- Producer(s): The Damned

The Damned singles chronology
"Dozen Girls" (1982)	"Generals" (1982)	"Thanks for the Night" (1984)

"Generals" is a single by the English punk rock band the Damned, released in November 1982.

Like its parent album, it featured increased experimentation, with a piano-led sound and the addition of brass to the band's typical punk rock blend. The song followed the thoughtful material on the album, commenting on the true losers in war.

The song was the band's last release on Bronze Records, who would drop the band when they hit financial difficulties. For their part, the Damned were never happy with the marketing they received, believing the label had no idea how to promote them. It would also be their last release with bassist Paul Gray, who would leave the band on the eve of their 1983 tour.

== Track listing ==
1. "Generals" (Scabies, Sensible, Vanian, Gray) - 3:24
2. "Disguise" (Scabies, Sensible, Vanian, Gray, Jugg) - 3:27
3. "Citadel Zombies" (Scabies, Sensible, Vanian, Gray, Jugg)

== Production credits ==
- Producers:
  - The Damned
- Musicians:
- Dave Vanian − vocals
- Captain Sensible − guitar
- Rat Scabies − drums
- Paul Gray − bass
- Guest Musicians
  - Simon Lloyd − brass on "Generals"
  - Roman Jugg − keyboard
