= Life on the Line =

Studio album by Eddie and the Hot Rods
- Released: 20 December 1977
- Studios: Regents Park, St. Johns Wood, London
- Genre: Pub rock
- Length: 34:53 – 1:07:01
- Label: Island
- Producer: Ed Hollis

Eddie and the Hot Rods chronology
| Teenage Depression (1976) | Life on the Line (1977) | Thriller (1979) |

Singles from Life on the Line
- 1. "Do Anything You Wanna Do"/"Schoolgirl Love" Released: 29 July 1977; 2. "Quit This Town"/"Distortion May Be Expected" Released: 16 December 1977; 3. "Life on the Line"/"Do Anything You Wanna Do (Live)" Released: 10 March 1978

Life on the Line is the second studio album by English rock band Eddie and the Hot Rods. The album was mixed by Ed Hollis and Steve Nicol, produced by Ed Hollis, and engineered by Steve Lillywhite.

Life on the Line reached number 27 on the UK Albums Chart. The album featured three singles: "Do Anything You Wanna Do", which peaked at number 9 on the UK Singles Chart, "Life on the Line", and "Quit This Town", which reached number 36.

The song "Do Anything You Wanna Do" was covered by Manfred Mann's Earth Band for their Criminal Tango album (1986).

== Critical reception ==
Professional ratings
Review scores
| Source | Rating |
|---|---|
| AllMusic | 4/5 stars |
| Christgau's Record Guide | B− |
| Record Mirror | 5/5 stars |

The Globe and Mail concluded: "This band is so topical, so accurate on contemporary street feeling (the alternation between active-passive is scary but authentic), that Life on the Line qualifies as more than a collection of tunes; it's a document that pegs 1977 as it hasn't yet been pegged."

== Track listing ==
1. "Do Anything You Wanna Do" (music: Graeme Douglas; lyrics: Ed Hollis) – 4:19
2. "Quit This Town" (music: Graeme; lyrics: Hollis, Douglas) – 2:27
3. "Telephone Girl" (music: Paul Gray, Steve Nicol; lyrics: Barry Masters) – 2:28
4. "What's Really Going On" (music & lyrics: Gray) – 2:17
5. "Ignore Them (Still Life)" (music: Douglas; lyrics: Hollis) – 4:43
6. "Life on the Line" (music: Douglas, Gray; lyrics: Hollis) – 4:04
7. "(And) Don't Believe Your Eyes" (music: Douglas; lyrics: Hollis) – 3:35
8. "We Sing... The Cross" (music: Douglas, Gray, Nicol) – 2:48
9. "Beginning of the End" (music & lyrics: Dave Higgs) – 8:17

2000 reissue bonus tracks

1. "I Might Be Lying" (Dave Higgs) – 5:16
2. "Ignore Them (Always Crashing in the Same Bar)" – 3:34
3. "Schoolgirl Love" (Douglas, Masters) – 3:21
4. "Till the Night Is Gone (Let's Rock)" – 3:13
5. "Flipside Rock" (With Robin Tyner) – 2:39
6. "Do Anything You Wanna Do" (Live) – 4:05
7. "What's Really Going On" (Live) (Douglas, Hollis) – 2:17
8. "Why Can't It Be" (Live) (Higgs) – 2:39
9. "Distortion May Be Expected" – 5:07

== Personnel ==
Eddie and the Hot Rods

- Barrie Masters – lead vocals
- Graeme Douglas – lead and rhythm guitar, backing vocals, 12-string guitar and organ on "(And) Don't Believe Your Eyes"
- Dave Higgs – rhythm guitar, backing vocals, Mellotron on "Beginning of the End"
- Paul Gray – bass, backing vocals
- Steve Nicol – drums, percussion, backing vocals

Technical

- The Rods, Graeme Douglas, Steve Lillywhite – assistant production
- Ed Hollis, Steve Lillywhite – mixing
- Steve Lillywhite – engineer
- Edward Barker, Keith Morris – design, photography

== Charts ==
| Chart (1977) | Peak position |
|---|---|
| UK Albums Chart | 27 |

Singles

| Year | Single | Chart | Position |
|---|---|---|---|
| 1977 | "Do Anything You Wanna Do" | UK Singles Chart | 9 |
| 1977 | "Quit This Town" | UK Singles Chart | 36 |
| 1978 | "Life on the Line" | UK Singles Chart | - |
