= Teenage Depression (album) =

Studio album by Eddie and the Hot Rods
- Released: 22 November 1976
- Studios: Jackson, Rickmansworth, Hertfordshire
- Genres: Pub rock, punk rock
- Length: 31:26; 73:55 (reissue)
- Label: Island
- Producers: Ed Hollis, Vic Maile

Eddie and the Hot Rods chronology
Teenage Depression (1976)	Life on the Line (1977)

Singles from Teenage Depression
- 1. "Teenage Depression"/"Shake" Released: 29 October 1976

Professional ratings
Review scores
Source	Rating
AllMusic	4.5/5 stars
The Village Voice	C+

Teenage Depression is the debut studio album by English rock band Eddie and the Hot Rods. The album was mixed by Jonz:A and R Howard Thomson and produced by Ed Hollis and Vic Maile. It reached number 43 on the UK Albums Chart.

The album's title track reached number 35 on the UK Singles Chart and was featured in the 1979 film Rock 'n' Roll High School. The album contains three cover songs, The Who's "The Kids Are Alright", Joe Tex's "Show Me", and Sam Cooke's "Shake".

Teenage Depression has been cited as a "missing link" between pub rock and punk rock, owing to its fast and hard-hitting R&B sound showing the attitude of a punk band. In 2000, a reissue was released with 12 additional tracks.

== Track listing ==
All songs written by Dave Higgs, except where noted.

1. "Get Across to You" – 2:48
2. "Why Can't It Be?" – 2:33
3. "Show Me" (Joe Tex) – 2:03
4. "All I Need Is Money" – 2:21
5. "Double Checkin' Woman" – 2:29
6. "The Kids Are Alright" (Pete Townshend) – 2:40
7. "Teenage Depression" – 2:59
8. "Horseplay (Wearier of the Schmaltz)" – 2:22
9. "Been So Long" – 3:22
10. "Shake" (Sam Cooke) – 1:30
11. "On the Run" – 6:26

2000 reissue bonus tracks

1. "Writing on the Wall" – 2:42
2. "Cruisin (In the Lincoln)" – 3:33
3. "Wooly Bully" (Domingo Samudio) – 2:37
4. "Horseplay" (Single Version) – 2:24
5. "96 Tears" (Live) (Rudy Martinez) – 2:58
6. "Get Out of Denver" (Live) (Bob Seger) – 3:51
7. "Medley: Gloria / Satisfaction" (Live) (Van Morrison/Mick Jagger, Keith Richards) – 5:24
8. "On the Run" (Live) – 9:02
9. "Hard Drivin Man" (Live) – 2:11
10. "Horseplay" (Live) – 2:30
11. "Double Checkin' Woman" (Live) – 2:37
12. "All I Need Is Money" (Live) – 2:56

1977 USA & Canada release track listing

1. "Get Across To You"
2. "Horseplay (Wearier Of The Schmaltz)"
3. "96 Tears"
4. "All I Need Is Money"
5. "The Kids Are Alright"
6. "On The Run"
1. "Teenage Depression"
2. "Been So Long"
3. "Why Can't It Be?"
4. "Double Checkin Woman"
5. "Get Out Of Denver"
6. "Gloria/(I Can't Get No) Satisfaction"

== Personnel ==
Eddie and the Hot Rods

- Barrie Masters – vocals
- Paul Gray – bass, backing vocals
- Steve Nicol – drums, backing vocals
- Dave Higgs – guitar, backing vocals, piano on "Horseplay (Wearier of the Schmaltz)"

Technical

- Michael Beal – art direction, photography
- Howard Thompson – A&R

== Charts ==
Chart (1976)	Peak position
UK Albums Chart	43

Singles

Year	Single	Chart	Position
1976	"Teenage Depression"	UK Singles Chart	35
