= Paul Gray (English musician) =

British bassist (born 1958)

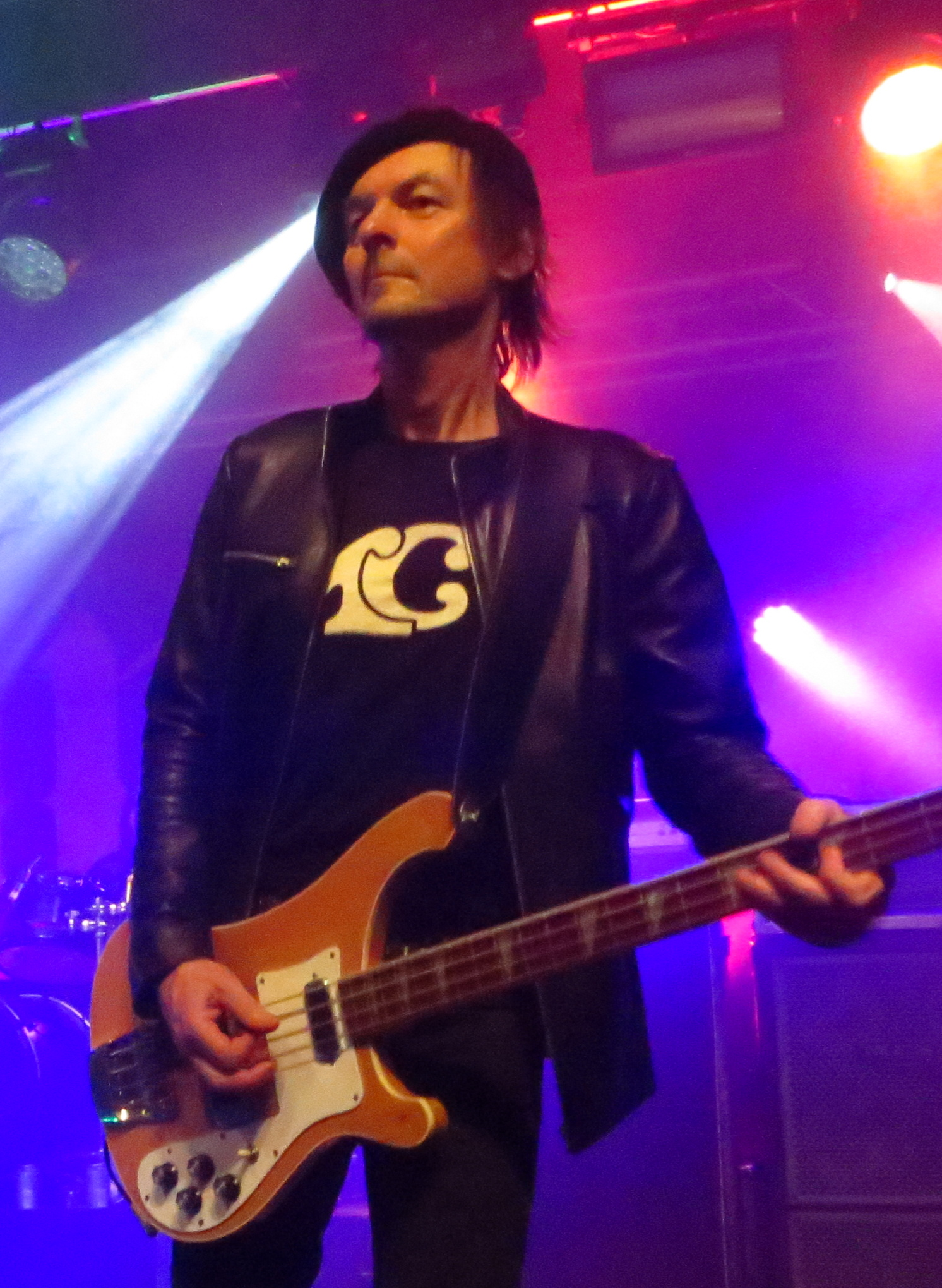
- Gray in 2018

Background information
- Born: 1 August 1958 (age 68)
- Origin: Leigh-on-Sea, England
- Genres: Hard rock; pub rock; heavy metal; punk rock
- Occupations: Musician, songwriter
- Instrument: Bass
- Years active: 1976–present

Paul Murray Granville Gray (born 1 August 1958) is an English bassist notable for playing with the rock bands Eddie and the Hot Rods, The Damned and UFO.

== Biography ==
Paul Gray was born in Leigh-on-Sea. Inspired by a Hawkwind gig he attended, Gray started learning bass guitar at the age of 13, his playing influenced by bassists such as Steve Currie, Lemmy, John Entwistle, Felix Pappalardi and Roger Glover. He joined Eddie and the Hot Rods as bassist after answering an advert in the Southend Evening Echo. The band had several hit singles and albums in the late 1970s, including "Do Anything You Wanna Do". While working with Eddie and the Hot Rods, he also recorded bass for Larry Wallis, Rob Tyner and Johnny Thunders, as well as filling in as temporary bassist for The Members. In early 1980, following the departure of Graeme Douglas, Gray left Eddie and the Hot Rods and, on the insistence of Captain Sensible and Rat Scabies, joined the punk rock band The Damned, replacing former bassist Algy Ward. Gray contributed to two studio albums, The Black Album and Strawberries, as well as numerous singles and the Friday 13th EP. Frictions in the band led to Gray's departure in February 1983. Shortly afterward, he joined UFO and remained until their split in 1987.

In 1989, after brief stints with Heavy Load, "Fast" Eddie Clarke's Fastway and Andrew Ridgeley, Gray rejoined The Damned, ostensibly for a one-off reunion tour of the UK, US, and Japan. This tour reunited Gray with Captain Sensible, and the two worked together on Sensible's solo material, as well as touring together. This Sensible-led group briefly evolved into another reunion of The Damned, with Gray concurrently reforming Eddie & the Hot Rods for one album, Gasoline Days, for which he contributed the songwriting, and supported the album with several tours in the UK and Germany. In between these high-profile projects, he also played bass with Canvey Island Allstars, and René Berg, and began producing local bands.

With the onset of severe tinnitus and hyperacusis interrupting his live music activities, Gray became Lead Tutor for Community Music Wales – a charity aimed at helping young bands based in Cardiff – on a variety of national and international projects between 1995 and 2004. In 1997, Gray formed Mischief with Alan Lee Shaw, a studio-based project allowing him to write and record without damaging his hearing further by playing live. In 1998, he appeared alongside Barry Masters of Eddie & the Hot Rods on the Identity Parade round of British comedy panel show Never Mind the Buzzcocks. In 2005, he took up the post of Regional Officer, Wales & Southwest England for the British Musicians' Union.

Gray reunited with Captain Sensible in 2013 to form psychedelic rock band The Sensible Gray Cells with drummer Ant Thickett. After the release of debut album A Postcard from Britain, Gray was diagnosed with throat cancer and had to cancel tentative plans to return to playing live music. He has since recovered. On 27 February 2014, Gray joined fellow original Hot Rods Barrie Masters, Steve Nicol, and Graeme Douglas on stage at The Oysterfleet, Canvey Island to play in tribute to the late Dave Higgs, founder member of the band. Gray joined Professor and the Madman in 2017, alongside former Damned drummer Rat Scabies, and featured on their albums Disintegrate Me and Live at the Hundred Club. In September 2017, Gray rejoined The Damned following the departure of Stu West, recording the album Evil Spirits and returning to full-time touring for the first time in nearly 15 years. Gray appeared on stage for the final Eddie and the Hot Rods show in April 2019, alongside founding members Barry Masters, Graeme Douglas and Steve Nicol. In 2020, both The Damned and The Sensible Gray Cells released new material, the latter including Gray's first lead vocal performance on "What's the Point of Andrew?". The Damned's 2020 EP The Rockfield Files included two tracks written by Gray, titled 'Manipulator' and 'The Spider & the Fly'. During the COVID-19 pandemic, Gray opened up Paul Gray Bass Online, a website offering services as a session bassist to recording artists.

In 2020, Gray formed the side-project Wingmen with guitarists Baz Warne (the Stranglers) and Leigh Heggarty (Ruts DC), and drummer Marty Love (Johnny Moped). The band released their self-titled debut album in 2023.

Gray toured with The Damned in 2024-2025, with shows focused on their 1980s-era albums.

== Discography ==
=== With Eddie and the Hot Rods ===
- "Writing on the Wall" (1976)
- "Wooly Bully" (1976)
- Live at the Marquee EP (1976)
- "Teenage Depression" (1976)
- Teenage Depression (1976)
- "I Might Be Lying" (1977)
- At the Sound of Speed EP (1977)
- "Do Anything You Wanna Do" (1977)
- Life on the Line (1977)
- "Quit This Town" (1977)
- "Life on the Line" (1978)
- "Media Messiahs" (1979)
- "Power and the Glory" (1979)
- Thriller (1979)
- Curse of the Hot Rods (1992)
- Gasoline Days (1996)

=== With Robin Tyner and the Hot Rods ===
- "Till the Night is Gone (Let's Rock)" / "Flipside Rock" (1977)

=== With Larry Wallis ===
- "Police Car" / "On Parole" (1977)

=== With Johnny Thunders ===
- So Alone (1978)

=== With The Damned ===
- "White Rabbit" (1980)
- "The History of the World (Part 1)" (1980)
- The Black Album (1980)
- "There Ain't No Sanity Clause" (1980)
- "Dr Jekyll & Mr Hyde" (1981)
- Friday 13th EP (1981)
- "Wait for the Blackout" (1982)
- "Lovely Money" (1982)
- "Dozen Girls" (1982)
- Strawberries (1982)
- "Lively Arts" (1982)
- "Generals" (1982)
- Mindless Directionless Energy – Live at the Lyceum 1981 (1987)
- Sessions of the Damned (1993)
- The Radio One Sessions (1996)
- "Standing on the Edge of Tomorrow" (2018)
- Evil Spirits (2018)
- The Rockfield Files (2020)
- Darkadelic (2023)

=== With Dolly Mixture ===
- "Everything and More" (1982)

=== With UFO ===
- "This Time" (1985)
- Misdemeanor (1985)
- The Misdemeanour Tour (1985)
- "Night Run" (1986)
- Ain't Misbehavin' (1988)
- "Between a Rock and a Hard Place" (1988)
- Heaven's Gate (Live) (1993)
- Headstone: Live at Hammersmith 1983 (1989)
- At The BBC on Air 1974 – 1985 (2013)
- "Hot 'N' Live" The Chrysalis Live Anthology 1974-1983 (2013)

=== With Captain Sensible ===
- Revolution Now (1989)
- Live at the Milky Way (1994)
- Meathead (1995)

=== With Andrew Ridgeley ===
- Son of Albert (1990)

=== With Canvey Island Allstars ===
- Escape from Oil City (1991)

=== With René Berg ===
- The Leather, The Loneliness And Your Dark Eyes (1992)

=== With Mischief / Wicked Gravity ===
- Hubble Bubble (2002) (later reissued as Wicked Gravity)

=== With The Sensible Gray Cells ===
- A Postcard from Britain (2013)
- "So Long" / "What's the Point of Andrew?" (2020)
- "Get Back into the World" / "World of Confusion" (2020)
- Get Back into the World (2020)

=== With Sir Silence and The Hush ===
- End of the Pier (2015)

=== With Rachel Taylor-Beales ===
- Stones Throw, Lament of the Selkie (2015)

=== With EVO ===
- Warfare (2017)

=== With Professor and the Madman ===
- Disintegrate Me (2018)
- Live at the 100 Club (2019)
- Séance (2020)

=== With Nick Toczek & Signia Alpha ===
- Walking The Tightrope (2021)
- The Columbus Memoirs (2022)

=== With Wingmen ===
- Wingmen (2023)

=== With Signia Alpha ===
- Entropy (2023)
- Wonderland (2025)
