= Get Back into the World =

Studio album by The Sensible Gray Cells
- Released: 27 November 2020
- Recorded: 2019–2020
- Studio: Panther Studios, Reigate, England; Chateau Sensible, Brighton, England; Chateau Gray, Cardiff, Wales
- Genre: Garage rock; psychedelic rock; psychedelic pop
- Label: Damaged Goods
- Producer: The Sensible Gray Cells

The Sensible Gray Cells chronology
A Postcard from Britain (2013)	Get Back into the World (2020)

Singles from Get Back into the World
- 1. "So Long" Released: 24 July 2020; 2. "Get Back into the World" Released: 13 November 2020

Get Back into the World is the second studio album by English rock band the Sensible Gray Cells, released 27 November 2020 by Damaged Goods. The band is a side project of guitarist Captain Sensible and bassist Paul Gray of the Damned, and the album is the first to feature drummer Marty Love of punk rock band Johnny Moped. The album was released seven years after their debut A Postcard from Britain. The two singles "So Long" and "Get Back into the World" both reached No. 5 on the Official Vinyl Singles Chart.

== Recording ==
In 2019, the Damned, featuring Captain Sensible and Paul Gray, toured with fellow British punk band Johnny Moped. Impressed with the band's drummer Marty Love, Sensible and Gray subsequently asked him to take part in their side project. "It was him that resurrected the Sensible Grey Cells project, having been a fan of A Postcard from Britain," Captain Sensible explained. "So after nagging us to make a follow up he had to put his money where his mouth was and occupy the drum seat." The band began recording Get Back into the World in 2019 at Panther Studios in Reigate, England with engineer Dick Crippen, former bassist with Tenpole Tudor and King Kurt.

With song ideas coming slowly together in the studio, the band's budget soon ran out and, followed by the COVID-19 lockdowns in early 2020, a home recording strategy became necessary. As with their first album, much of Get Back into the World was recorded at home, with band members sending files to each other. "All the drums were done in a recording studio, and probably four bass lines and some lead vocals, and some backing vocals," Marty Love said. "Most of it was, ultimately, done in our houses." With free time on their hands, because of the lockdowns, the band "messed around" with the songs, extending parts and adding instrumental sections. "It became a bit epic and moody in places too," Sensible said. Some of the album's songs were originally written for and rejected by the Damned, but that should not be seen as "an indication of inferior songwriting," according to Sensible, "more that they're not wearing the right shirt."

Sensible said of his playing on the album that he tried things he had never done before musically, especially in the instrumental passages of certain songs: "I was listening to a lot of Peter Green's guitar playing, he had such a beautiful tone and economy in his playing. Instead of a flurry of notes and twiddle-y diddley I was trying to pedal back and play something more thoughtful." He also used different guitar tunings and Arabic Middle Eastern scales, "rather than your standard rock stuff, just trying to do something interesting," he said

== Lyrical content ==
According to ThePunkSite.com, "there is some biting social commentary, with the scathing "What's the Point of Andrew?" being a prime example, as well as indulging a love of campy horror movies and pretty much everything in-between." Classic Rock magazine wrote that the band "take potshots at a variety of cultural targets, from politics, social media and e-commerce to inane DJs ... while having a ball in the process." They also noted more reflective tracks and "lyrical slapstick" in "Sell Her Spark", an ode to Selhurst Park, home of Sensible's favourite football team Crystal Palace F.C.

The title track is about online social interaction and modern consumer culture. "It was about let's actually get back out there and interacting one to one again," Paul Gray explained. "Don't Say I Didn't Warn Ya" deals with the theme of health and "the words of one's parents coming back to haunt us now," Sensible said. Two songs, "Black Spider Memo Man" and "What's the Point of Andrew?", are about the British royal family. The first is about Prince Charles "because he writes these black spider memos to members of parliament, which he shouldn't do," Sensible explained. "The royal family should keep out of politics." The latter sums up Prince Andrew and his sex abuse allegations. "A Little Prick" concerns conspiracy theories surrounding COVID-19 and "I Married a Monster" celebrates the band's love of old Ealing comedies, Carry On films and 1950's horror films like The Blob and I Married a Monster from Outer Space. "This is our musical tongue-in-cheek spoof homage to them," Gray said.

== Album cover ==
The album cover photograph was taken by a friend of the band on a Mediterranean holiday. "He said it all looked like a Hipgnosis album cover and took the snap we ended up using," Sensible explained. When the band saw the photograph it tied everything together, from the lyrics, recording the album and the COVID-19 pandemic in 2020. "He came across this scene with all these tables laid out and it looks like the image of the virus," Sensible said, "it was a really great coincidence that it was so perfect."

== Reception and musical style ==
Professional ratings
Review scores
Source	Rating
Classic Pop	3/5 stars
Classic Rock	7/10
IPA Music	8/10
Mojo	3/5 stars
ThePunkSite.com	3.5/5 stars

Louder Than War described the music as a "blend of full-on punk attitude and verve with a sense of infectious fun – but in a way that incorporates their sixties garage and fifties rock'n'roll influences in a very apparent way." They felt that the "thoughtfully reserved production" and the use of Hammond organ adds to the album's retro feel, adding, "but this is more than a record which relies solely on the past, dealing with modern issues in its lyricism." Like Louder Than War, most reviewers mentioned the album's garage and psychedelic rock influences, with Mojo writing that it "leans heavily on pop melodies to gild its garage-psych lilies," and Clash describing the album as "a ferocious homage to the lost sounds of '65."

Other reviewers noticed further elements among the album's tracks, as both Classic Pop and the IPA Music website thought that the songwriting on "Get Back Into the World" sounds like Madness, and the We Are Cult website mentioned keyboard drones and Indian scales on "Another World". We Are Cult wrote, "The eastern quality of the track continues throughout and in all, it is a number that could have found a home in any number of counter-culture albums, such as those produced by Jefferson Aeroplane or the Mahavishnu Orchestra. Indeed, had a set of tablas and a sitar appeared it would have come as no surprise."

The Über Röck website called the album an "outstanding release" with "rich, complex layers" where the songwriting and the production create an "overwhelming atmosphere," while IPA Music called it "a Damned fine second album" that was "full of smashing songs." The RPM Online website wrote that it could have been a great Damned album, feeling it was better than the Damned's last effort, 2018's Evil Spirits.

== Track listing ==
All tracks are written by Captain Sensible, except where noted.

No.	Title	Writer(s)	Length
1.	"Sell Her Spark"
2.	"Get Back Into the World"	Paul Gray, Anthony Lewis
3.	"Don't Say I Didn't Warn Ya"	Gray
4.	"Black Spider Memo Man"
5.	"Stupid Dictators"
6.	"So Long"
7.	"A Little Prick"
8.	"DJ With Half a Brain"
9.	"Jam Tomorrow"	Gray
10.	"What's the Point of Andrew?"	Gray
11.	"Fine Fairweather Friend"
12.	"I Married a Monster"	Gray
13.	"You and Me"
14.	"Another World"

Note

- The vinyl edition omits "Jam Tomorrow" and "Another World".

== Personnel ==
Credits adapted from the album's liner notes.

The Sensible Gray Cells

- Captain Sensible – vocals, guitar, keyboards
- Paul Gray – vocals (lead vocals on "Don't Say I Didn't Warn Ya", "Jam Tomorrow" and "What's the Point of Andrew?"), bass, keyboards
- Marty Love – drums, percussion, backing vocals

Additional personnel

- Monty Oxymoron – additional keyboards on "What's the Point of Andrew?"
- Maxine – backing vocals on "Sell Her Spark", "Get Back Into the World", "Stupid Dictators", "So Long", "Fine Fairweather Friend" and "Another World"

Technical

- The Sensible Gray Cells – producer
- Dick Crippen – engineer, mixing (6, 10)
- Alfie Agnew – mixing (1–3, 5, 7, 11, 12)
- Sean Elliott – mixing (1–3, 5, 7, 11, 12)
- Captain Sensible – mixing (3)
- Syd Burns – mixing (4)
- Remko Takken – mixing (8, 9, 14)
- Anthony Clark – cover photography
- Alison Wonderland – photography
- Ian Damaged – artwork
