= A Postcard from Britain =

Studio album by The Sensible Gray Cells
- Released: October 2013
- Recorded: 2012–2013
- Studio: Kate's Garage, Rudry, Wales
- Genre: Rock; psychedelic rock
- Length: 40:35
- Label: Easy Action
- Producer: Captain Sensible; Paul Gray

The Sensible Gray Cells chronology
A Postcard from Britain (2013)	Get Back into the World (2020)

Professional ratings
Review scores
Source	Rating
Record Collector	3/5 stars
With Guitars	7.6/10

A Postcard from Britain is the first studio album by English rock band the Sensible Gray Cells, released in October 2013 by Easy Action. The band is a side project of guitarist Captain Sensible and bassist Paul Gray of the Damned along with drummer Anthony Thickett. The theme of modern-day Britain runs throughout the album, which the band themselves describe as a concept album.

== Background ==
In the 1980s and 1990s, Captain Sensible and Paul Gray had worked together, both in the Damned and on Sensible's solo work. For years, the two had talked about recording an album together again, and in the autumn of 2012, Sensible visited Gray for a week at his home in South Wales. Both brought in songs for the project and some were written together. They traded ideas for songs in between visits to the local pub, where many of the lyrics were written. Commenting on the album's concept, Gray said, "The "postcards" theme quickly manifested itself, all the quirky things that make our funny old country both good and not so good ... it was great working to a theme and made the whole process very easy lyrically – it came together very quickly and was hugely democratic."

They recruited drummer Anthony Thickett, who Gray played with in local band Monte Dons. "He has a great swing feel to his playing," Gray said. "We didn’t want a bish bash bosh merchant, and he fitted the bill perfectly." Sensible, a self-confessed aficionado of the Nuggets compilation albums of 1960s psychedelic and garage rock singles, was excited to record parts of the album in a real garage. "So when Kate, a retired doctor and friend of Mr. Gray's said we could use her's," he said, "it was an offer we simply couldn't refuse." With no budget, the band recorded the backing tracks in the garage, usually in a day, and then tracked the rest on their laptops in Gray's kitchen. The vocals and acoustic guitars were recorded on a cheap microphone placed in a cardboard box with egg cartons. The bouzoukis and some of Gray's guitar parts were taken from his 4-track Portastudio demos "as they had a certain gnarled, 'rough and ready' charm to them." Former Monty Dons members, Alan Davies and Phil Blight, contributed backing vocals, and Kate Briscoe, who let them use her garage played piano on one track. Sensible and Gray both knew former member of Hawkwind, the Welsh-residing Nik Turner. "He was well up for blowing some sax," Gray said in 2013, "so we boshed down to his gaff earlier this year with the laptop and he honked away as only he can on a couple of tracks." Sensible added "bits and pieces" at his home in Brighton, "and then we gave it to an engineer friend of mine to mix," Gray said.

The subject matter of the songs ranges from British drinking culture ("Tragic Roundabout"), the nostalgia for family businesses ("Forgotten High Streets") and X Factor-type television shows ("Halfway to Hollywood") to global warming ("English Summer"), the surveillance society ("Looking at You"), and Tony Blair and the Iraq War ("Stole Into the Night"). "I think the lyrics are very transparent," Gray said, "we wanted them to be accessible, they’re all about the things that bothered or amused us."

A proposed tour in support of the album was dropped due to poor ticket sales.

== Reception ==
Ian Abrahams, writing for Record Collector magazine, called the album "an engaging record with an appealing 1960s vibe and judicious sense of humour." He described the music as "catchy psychedelia" mixed with "pub-rock sensibilities." He felt that some of the best moments are the low-key ones, writing that "there's a Ray Davies air to the lament and longing of "Forgotten High Streets" and a delightfully wistful angst to "City Bird"." On a less positive note, Abrahams wrote that "while it’s clear what they’re getting at on "Lottery of Life", the likes of Susan Boyle, Jeremy Clarkson and Posh and Becks are lazy targets. From that respect, some of their commentary is a bit patchy."

Andy Close from the Pure Rawk website called it "a cracking collection of tunes" with "great hooks" and With Guitars magazine's Steve Janes called it "a good body of work." Janes noted Sensible's "unique guitar style" and Gray's "trademark Rickenbacker basslines," describing the album as "well played, falling under, for the most part, the alternative pop banner."

In the Big Takeover magazine, writer Greg Bartalos placed the album at No. 2 on his "My 10 favorite albums of 2013" list.

== Track listing ==
Credits adapted from the album's liner notes.

All tracks are written by Captain Sensible and Paul Gray

No.	Title	Length
1.	"Tragic Roundabout"	4:04
2.	"Halfway to Hollywood"	3:52
3.	"Queen for a Day"	5:32
4.	"Stole Into the Night"	4:26
5.	"State of the Nation"	2:40
6.	"Lottery of Life"	3:07
7.	"English Summer"	3:14
8.	"Forgotten High Streets"	4:16
9.	"City Bird"	1:31
10.	"Looking at You"	7:53

== Personnel ==
The Sensible Gray Cells

- Captain Sensible – vocals, guitar, keyboards
- Paul Gray – bass, guitar, keyboards, backing vocals
- Anthony Thickett – drums, percussion

Additional personnel

- Nik Turner – saxophone on "State of the Nation" and "Looking at You"
- Kate Briscoe – piano on "Halfway to Hollywood"
- Alan 'Big Al' Davies – backing vocals
- Phil Blight – backing vocals

Technical

- Captain Sensible – producer
- Paul Gray – producer
- Steve Davies – mixing, mastering
- Andy Martin – cover art (postcard designs)
- Alan 'Big Al' Davies – photography (band photos)
