= Thriller (Eddie and the Hot Rods album) =

Studio album by Eddie and the Hot Rods
- Released: March 9, 1979
- Recorded: 1979
- Studios: Abbey Road, London; mixed at Roundhouse, London
- Genres: Pub rock, punk rock
- Length: 43:25
- Label: Island
- Producer: Peter Ker

Eddie and the Hot Rods chronology
Life on the Line (1977)	Thriller (1979)	Fish 'N' Chips (1981)

Singles from Thriller
- 1. "Media Messiahs"/"Horror Through Straightness" Released: January 19, 1979; 2. "The Power and the Glory"/"Highlands One, Hopefuls Two" Released: March 9, 1979

Thriller is the third studio album by pub rock band Eddie and the Hot Rods, reaching No. 50 on the UK Albums Chart. Released in 1979, it was produced by Peter Ker. Shortly after the release of Thriller, the band was sacked by their record company and forced to join EMI Records. The album was reissued in 2002 with two bonus tracks: "Horror Through Straightness" and "Highlands 1 Hopefuls 2". These songs had been the B-sides to the singles released on the LP.

The album featured two singles: "Media Messiahs" and "The Power and the Glory", neither of which charted on the UK Singles Chart.

Linda McCartney provided backing vocals on "The Power and the Glory". Reception of the album was muted.

== Critical reception ==
Professional ratings
Review scores
Source	Rating
AllMusic	4/5 stars
MusicHound Rock: The Essential Album Guide	2.5/5 stars

Trouser Press wrote that "the album reeks with bitterness; although competent, it has neither the freshness of Life on the Line nor anything substantial to replace it." In 2002, Goldmine noted that "it's the sound of a group realizing that history had left them behind and even their old fans had drifted away."

== Track listing ==
1. "The Power and the Glory" (Graeme Douglas) – 4:16
2. "Echoes" (Paul Gray, Steve Nicol) – 2:54
3. "Media Messiahs" (Graeme Douglas) – 2:54
4. "Circles" (Dave Higgs) – 2:55
5. "He Does It with Mirrors" (Dave Higgs, Graeme Douglas) – 4:12
6. "Strangers" (Graeme Douglas) – 2:46
7. "Out to Lunch" (Dave Higgs) – 4:48
8. "Breathless" (Graeme Douglas, Paul Gray) – 3:33
9. "Take It or Leave It" (Barrie Masters, Graeme Douglas) – 4:12
10. "Living Dangerously" (Dave Higgs) – 3:36
11. "Horror Through Straightness" (Dave Higgs, Steve Nicol, Paul Gray) – 4:25
12. "Highlands 1 Hopefuls 2" (Dave Higgs, Barrie Masters) – 3:00

== Personnel ==
Eddie and the Hot Rods

- Barrie Masters – vocals
- Graeme Douglas – guitar, backing vocals
- Dave Higgs – guitar, backing vocals
- Paul Gray – bass guitar, backing vocals
- Steve Nicol – drums, backing vocals

with:

- Jools Holland – piano
- Lee Brilleaux – harmonica
- Linda McCartney – backing vocals on "The Power and the Glory"

== Charts ==
Chart (1979)	Peak position
UK Albums Chart	50
