= Do Anything You Wanna Do =

Single by Eddie and the Hot Rods

from the album Life on the Line
- B-side: "Schoolgirl Love"
- Released: July 29, 1977
- Genre: Punk rock; new wave; power pop; pub rock
- Length: 4:00
- Label: Island
- Songwriter(s): Ed Hollis, Graeme Douglas
- Producer(s): Ed Hollis

Eddie and the Hot Rods singles chronology
"I Might Be Lying" (1977)	"Do Anything You Wanna Do" (1977)	"Till the Night Is Gone (Let's Rock)" (1977)

Official audio
- "Do Anything You Wanna Do" on YouTube

"Do Anything You Wanna Do" is a song written by Eddie and the Hot Rods' manager Ed Hollis (the brother of Talk Talk's Mark Hollis) and guitarist Graeme Douglas and recorded by the band, although the actual record label simply credited Rods as the artist. It reached No. 9 on the UK Singles Chart in 1977. The song was produced by Ed Hollis and arranged by the band. It was featured on their 1977 album, Life on the Line.

The song was voted the 9th best single of the year in the end of year critics poll in the NME.

The band performed the song on the Marc television programme presented by Marc Bolan, in 1977.

A live version was featured as the B-side to their 1978 single, "Life on the Line".

Manfred Mann's Earth Band recorded their version of the song for the album Criminal Tango in 1986.

The tune was featured in the 2009 film The Invention of Lying.
