= Lovely Money =

Single by the Damned
- B-side: "I Think I'm Wonderful"; "Lovely Money" (Disco mix)
- Released: 18 June 1982
- Recorded: 1982
- Genre: Rock
- Length: 5:21
- Label: Bronze; BRO 149
- Songwriters: Scabies; Sensible; Vanian; Gray
- Producers: The Damned; Tony Mansfield

The Damned singles chronology
| "'Friday 13th EP'" (1981) | "Lovely Money" (1982) | "Dozen Girls" (1982) |

Official audio
- "Lovely Money" on YouTube

"Lovely Money" is a single by the English rock band the Damned, released on 18 June 1982.

Their first release with new label Bronze, it showcased the band's willingness to experiment, being a seemingly lightweight slice of pop thanks to a disco-style electronic drumbeat, which contrasted with a voiceover provided by former Bonzo Dog Doo-Dah Band frontman Vivian Stanshall that criticised the nationalism that had arisen following the Falklands War in 1982. The "Disco Mix" was essentially the same track, with the backing sped up by the mischievous band.

Bronze attempted to boost sales by issuing a picture disc version of the single as well, and also issued the single in France, Germany, the Netherlands, Italy, Australia and New Zealand.

== Track listing ==
All songs by Scabies, Sensible, Vanian, Gray.

1. "Lovely Money" - 5:21
2. "I Think I'm Wonderful" - 3:06
3. "Lovely Money (Disco Mix)"

== Production credits ==
Producers

- Tony Mansfield
- The Damned

Musicians

- Dave Vanian − vocals
- Captain Sensible − guitar, keyboards
- Rat Scabies − drums
- Paul Gray − bass
- Viv Stanshall − spoken word on "Lovely Money"

== Charts ==
"Lovely Money" spent 4 weeks on the UK singles chart, peaking at number 42 in July 1982.
