= Dozen Girls =

Single by the Damned

from the album Strawberries
- B-side: "Take That"; "Mine's a Large One Landlord"; "Torture Me"
- Released: 17 September 1982
- Recorded: 1982
- Studio: Rockfield (Monmouth, Wales)
- Genre: Punk rock; garage rock
- Length: 4:21
- Label: Bronze; BRO 156
- Songwriters: Scabies; Sensible; Vanian
- Producers: The Damned; Hugh Jones

The Damned singles chronology
"Lovely Money" (1982)	"Dozen Girls" (1982)	"Generals" (1982)

Official audio
- "Dozen Girls" on YouTube

"Dozen Girls" is a single by the English punk rock band the Damned, released on 17 September 1982 by Bronze Records.

After the experiment of "Lovely Money", the song returned the band to slightly more familiar territory, but failed to chart. The album version released on Strawberries was slightly different from the single version, with the play-out featuring a roll call of a dozen girls replaced by the repeated line "He's alright and he don't care, he's got thermal underwear". Some pressings of the single credited Billy Karloff as a co-writer of "Dozen Girls".

The single was also issued in Bolivia by Philips Records, with "Bad Time for Bonzo" on the B-side.

The song "Torture Me", which appeared on the single, is about the ethics of eating meat. It was composed and performed by Captain Sensible, who was a vegetarian at the time.

== Track listing ==
All songs written by Scabies, Sensible, Vanian.

1. "Dozen Girls" – 4:21
2. "Take That" – 2:48
3. "Mine's a Large One Landlord" – 1:16
4. "Torture Me" – 1:26

== Production credits ==
Producers

- The Damned
- Hugh Jones on "Dozen Girls" and "Take That"

Musicians

- Dave Vanian − vocals
- Captain Sensible − guitar, vocals on "Take That" and "Torture Me", keyboards
- Rat Scabies − drums
- Paul Gray − bass
