= Fish 'n' Chips =

Studio album by Eddie and the Hot Rods
- Released: 1980
- Recorded: 1981
- Studio: Basing Street, London
- Genre: Pub rock, punk rock
- Length: 34:39 Reissue: 1:13:07
- Label: EMI
- Producer: Al Kooper

Eddie and the Hot Rods chronology
Thriller (1979)	Fish 'n' Chips (1980)	Gasoline Days (1996)

Singles from Fish 'n' Chips
- 1. "Wide Eyed Kids"/"Leave Us Alone" Released: November 1980; 2. "Farther on Down the Road (You Will Accompany Me)"/"Fish 'n' Chips Part 2" Released: April 1981

Professional ratings
Review scores
Source	Rating
AllMusic	2/5 stars

Fish 'n' Chips is the fourth studio album released by pub rock band Eddie and the Hot Rods. It was produced and mixed by Al Kooper, engineered by Bob Edwards and assistant Stuart Henderson, and mastered by Mike Reese. The LP was the first album for EMI Records who they signed to in 1979. According to Barrie Masters, the record company "just let it slip out" and it wasn't very successful, subsequently resulting in the dissolution of the Hot Rods in late 1981. The band reformed for a year from 1984 to 1985 but it wouldn't be until 1996 that they completed another studio album. This release also sees the departure of Paul Gray with him being replaced by T.C. (Tony Cranney).

The album featured two singles: "Wide Eyed Kids" and "Farther on Down the Road (You Will Accompany Me)", both of which did not chart on the UK Singles Chart.

== Track listing ==
1. "Fish 'n' Chips Part 1" (Barrie Masters, Dave Higgs, Steve Nicol) - 0:40
2. "Wide Eyed Kids" (Higgs) - 4:05
3. "You Better Run" (Eddie Brigati, Felix Cavaliere) - 2:33
4. "Time Won't Let Me" (Tom King, Chet Kelley) - 2:33
5. "Unfinished Business" (Masters, Higgs, Nicol) - 3:42
6. "Another Party" (Higgs) - 3:00
7. "This Is Today" (Higgs) - 3:18
8. "Farther on Down the Road (You Will Accompany Me)" (Jesse Ed Davis, Taj Mahal) - 3:45
9. "Call It Quits" (Higgs) - 3:40
10. "We Want Mine" (John Palumbo) - 3:27
11. "Fish 'n' Chips" (Masters, Higgs, Nicol) - 3:59

Bonus Tracks On Reissue:

1. "At Night" - 2:39
2. "Looking Around" - 2:18
3. "Leave Us Alone" - 2:14
4. "Don't Call Me I'll Call You" - 3:09
5. "Hospital Food" - 2:22
6. "Act Sharper" - 2:30
7. "I See the Light" - 2:19
8. "Red Light, Blue Light" - 2:22
9. "I Got Mine" - 3:12
10. "Observations of the Second Time" - 4:57
11. "The Ties That Bind" - 3:12
12. "Romance in a Used Car" - 3:59
13. "Penetration Blues" - 3:21

== Personnel ==
Eddie and the Hot Rods

- Barrie Masters - vocals
- Steve Nicol - drums, backing vocals
- Dave Higgs - guitar, backing vocals
- Tony "T.C." Cranney - bass, backing vocals

with:

- Al Kooper - keyboards, guitar, arrangements
- Rufus Jenkins - accordion on "Farther on Down the Road (You Will Accompany Me)"

Technical

- Bob Edwards - engineer
