= String Theory (The Selecter album) =

Studio album by The Selecter
- Released: 24 February 2013
- Recorded: 2012
- Studio: Vocaphone Studios
- Genre: Ska; 2 Tone
- Length: 39:16
- Label: Vocaphone
- Producer: Neil Pyzer

The Selecter chronology
Made in Britain (2011)	String Theory (2013)	Subculture (2015)

String Theory is the thirteenth studio album by English ska band The Selecter, released on Vocaphone Music in 2013. After the discussion of multiculturalism and the racial equality of 2 Tone music on the band's previous album Made in Britain (2011), String Theory built upon on and extends from those themes, addressing contemporary issues in the United Kingdom such as riots and racial issues, backing the music with ska and reggae rhythms. The band took influence from the string theory which suggests humans are made of the same particles, and how it can be a metaphor for a connection between all human beings.

In promotion of the album, the band embarked on the String Theory Tour in March 2013 which played throughout the United Kingdom, and also toured the United States the following the month. Upon the album's release in February 2013, it received critical acclaim, with critics noting that the material on the album rivals the band's back catalogue. The band were also pleased with the album as, intending to release an album they would be proud of in years to come, they feel they achieved this aim.

== Background and concept ==
After having split up for four years so that lead vocalist Pauline Black could work on her autobiography Black by Design, The Selecter reformed with a new line-up in 2010, and, with a wealth of material ready to be recorded, released their comeback album Made in Britain (2011), which was released to critical acclaim. During the subsequent touring in promotion of the album, the band were given "that luxury of time where you can start thinking about what you want to do next," and that was how the follow-up album String Theory developed.

With Made in Britain, the band's lyrics, as Black later explained, mostly "discussed multiculturalism and how things were today, and what 2 Tone's legacy was in this new century." For String Theory, the band wanted to move on from those themes, while developing on them. Pauline later explained they wanted to take the multicultural theme of Made in Britain further on String Theory, explaining: "People still find their differences. They celebrate their differences more than they celebrate the things that unite us. And the thing that unites us: We are all human beings and ought to be treated like human beings. The human rights that we extend to ourselves should be extended to people of all nations." In relation to the album's themes, the band named the album String Theory partly in reference to the actual string theory and how it can relate to human connection and the band's history. Black explained:

"String theory suggests that we’re all made of the same stuff. And it’s the same stuff as the universe is made of and, if that is so, then everybody in the human race is connected in some way or another. So, it works on that level but it also works on a micro level, which is that we’re tied to our past of 1979 and it’s kind of like a piece of string and we’re like fumbling through to the future. It was just a nice way of saying that. Whether people get it or not really doesn’t matter, does it? Makes for nice art work."

=== Writing and recording ===
"What tends to happen is that we lay down like a mini manifesto of what we want to say, and then gear what we are writing towards that. You need some degree of planning, but it depends if the muse is on you. You may write something that is completely leftfield and wouldn't sit on the album, but it doesn't stop you writing it because it may fit on another album down the line or an EP that you want to put out. We very much approach it like that, and then we record them and pick the best out of what we have."

—Pauline Black on writing and recording Selecter albums such as String Theory.

Similarly to Made in Britain, String Theory was mostly written by the band's vocalists Black and Arthur "Gaps" Hendrickson and saxophonist and producer Neil Pyzer. "We work closely together," Black explained, "and it's a writing partnership that we feel works very very well at the moment." Although more than ten songs had been written for the album, the band selected the ten that they felt "fully exploited" what the band wanted to say. As with previous albums, the band envisioned how the songs would sound live when writing them.

The band recorded String Theory in the immediate-aftermath of their sell-out "Made in Britain 2012 Tour." Unlike Made in Britain, which was recorded in less than a month due to a wealth of material already being ready for it, the band took more time with String Theory because they wanted "to really get something that we’d be proud of years later." Although the writing trio had produced Made in Britain, Pyzer produced String Theory alone, and the band recorded the entire album at Vocaphone Studios, owned by Pyzer's record label Vocaphone Records.

In addition to the string theory-human connection concept, the album was also titled String Theory in relation to how many songs "start normally from six strings strumming your guitar in a room by yourself and from your vocal chords which are just vibrating strings themselves. You can then open that out from that one particular person in a room making up a song, and then take it out to other people. It is like those strings continue on a journey. It is like as well how long that piece of string is because it then goes to other musicians who put their tuppence worth in. Then you're recording it, and then of course you put it out there, and then a whole new set of people listen to it."

== Music and lyrics ==
In the words of Andy Peart from Vive Le Rock, String Theory tackles serious subjects "and makes them danceable with a fiery cocktail of infectious ska and reggae rhythms," keeping with "the best tradition of the 2 Tone era." Pauline Black felt that, while Made in Britain explored themes similar to the band's debut album Too Much Pressure (1980), String Theory broadens out those themes in a similar fashion to how the band's second album Celebrate the Bullet (1981) broadened out "those initial social arguments that we came with at the beginning. Those two are a mirror image of that work then." The band stated on their website that the album's ten songs "connect with their past while saying something about today."

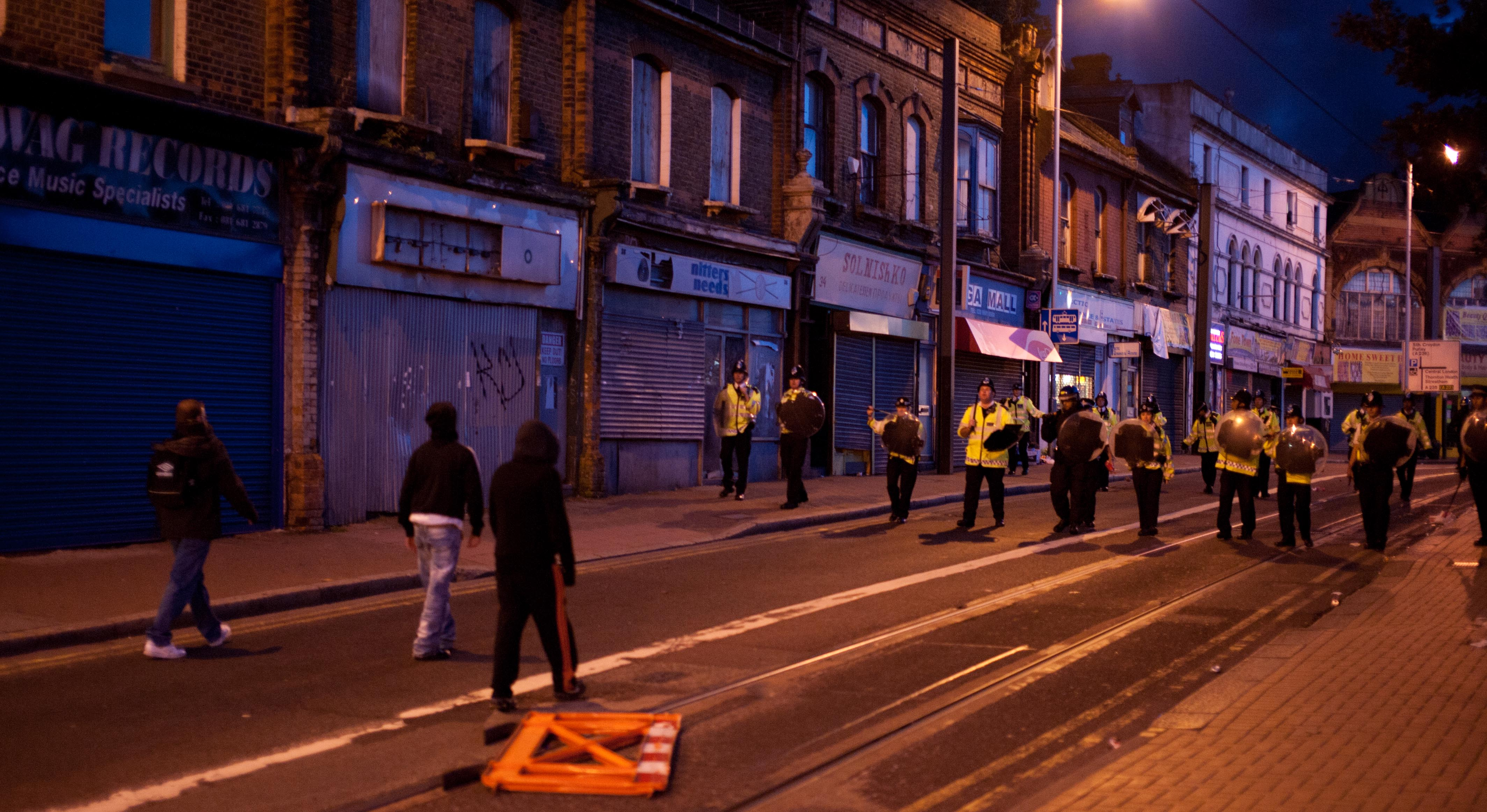
"London's Burning" addresses the 2011 England riots.

The ska-infused opening track, "The Avengers Theme", is a cover version of the theme music from 1960s British espionage television series The Avengers. "A Prince Among Men", Black's favourite song from the record, features smooth reggae undertones and Hendrickson name-checking persons such as Bob Marley, Martin Luther King Jr. and Marcus Garvey. It also features the line "If a man has to die, then make sure it’s for a good reason. Coz history is the killing season." Pauline explained: "It's aimed at a black leader emerging, to look at what’s going on in the world in terms of the atrocities that have been going on in Africa. And the way that Africa has been left after the colonial past. And it could relate to all kinds of people. Gaps lists a lot of people at the end, Lumumba …. And we don’t just keep it to men. 'Prince Among Men' is a saying. It stands for 'leader' this is someone who can take things forward."

"Flatworld" addresses the "emptiness of virtual modern lives," while "London's Burning" addresses the 2011 England riots and various national occupy movements. "What we were trying to demonstrate was, when you are in the middle of a global recession and the banks get off scot-free, and basically the people pay for it, these things are likely to happen." Black felt "London's Burning" and "High Hair," which is about "ladies of a certain age that like to go out and have fun," as carrying the strongest messages of any song on the album. "We just talk about subjects that don't get talked about in the everyday run-of the mill X-Factor nonsense that goes on. Neither of those songs are going to make a dent about the way people think about those kinds of shows, but that is how it is for us and long may it continue it like that is the way I look at it.

== Release and reception ==
Professional ratings
Review scores
Source	Rating
Martin C. Strong	6/10
Vive Le Rock	8/10

String Theory was announced in December 2012 on the band's website, and a preview was released on the band's website in early February. String Theory was released by Pyzer's record label Vocaphone Records on CD and limited edition LP formats on 24 February 2013. While the album was made available on popular online sites, it was "most importantly" available at the band's shows, where Black and Hendrickson "are always proud to get out in the foyer, both before and after every show, to meet their fans." The band's 20-date String Theory Tour was performed in March 2013 throughout the UK. Five songs from String Theory, "The Avengers Theme", "London’s Burning", "A Prince Among Men", "Secret Love" and "Warrior", were played on the tour alongside older material.

Touring in promotion of the album was more comfortable than touring during the band's original 1979-82 run. In an interview with the Fred Perry website, Black explained: "that whole male/female duo at the front is unique within any of the 2 tone bands that recorded on 2 Tone, and it allows us to explore a wider range of issues, themes and music generally, because you have the different registers of voice so it can be that much more interesting, much more interplay." The last date of the UK String Theory tour on 31 March was a homecoming gig in the band's native Coventry. The following month, the band toured the United States, playing alongside dub musician Lee "Scratch" Perry for most of the gigs, as well as performing at the Coachella Festival.

The band felt the album was successful; their intention with String Theory was to create an album they would be proud of in later years, and according to Black, "I think we’ve achieved that. I think it’s some of the best work that The Selecter have made so far." After the band finished touring the album in mid-2013, they also planned for their successful tour with Public Image Ltd in October 2013. String Theory was also released to rave reviews from music critics. Although, in his book The Great Rock Discography, writer Martin C. Strong, who himself rated the album five out of ten, stated String Theory was "given a review by-pass from the most of the media," similar to its predecessor Made in Britain, Andy Peart of Vive Le Rock was favourable, rating the album eight out of ten, and saying its "another example of this revitalised band's refusal to simply revisit their past by demonstrating their ability to write contemporary songs which rival their back catalogue." He concluded:

"Black and Hendrickson [are] never afraid to deal with the big issues, while musically the Selecter sound as relevant as they did in their heyday. String Theory will not only appeal to the Selecter's original 2Tone fans, it will also go down a storm with the new generation of reggae and ska fans who've discovered the genre through bands like the Skints and Dirty Revolution, and that's some achievement for a band close to celebrating their 35th anniversary."

== Track listing ==
All tracks composed by Pauline Black, Arthur Henderson and Neil Pyzer; except where indicated

1. "The Avengers Theme" (Laurie Johnson) – 2:38
2. "A Prince Among Men" – 5:36
3. "Warrior" – 3:39
4. "Flatworld" – 3:51
5. "Secret Love" (Sammy Fain, Paul Francis Webster) – 3:19
6. "High Hair" – 4:12
7. "London's Burning" – 3:33
8. "Doors Ever Open" – 4:26
9. "Post Modern 3:39
10. "667 (The Neighbour of the Beast)" – 4:22

== Personnel ==
The Selecter

- Pauline Black – vocals
- Arthur "Gaps" Hendrickson – vocals
- John Thompson – bass
- Anthony Harty – guitar
- Neil Pyzer – guitar, flute, keyboards, saxophone, production
- Orlando Larose – baritone saxophone, alto flute, piccolo flute
- Greg Coulson – organ
- Winston Marche – drums

Other

- Beverley Skeete – backing vocals
- Ricci P. Washington – backing vocals
- Patrick Kenny – trombone
- Gareth Bailey – tenor trombone, bass trombone
- John "Teflon" Sims – artwork
