= Eddie and the Hot Rods =

British pub rock band

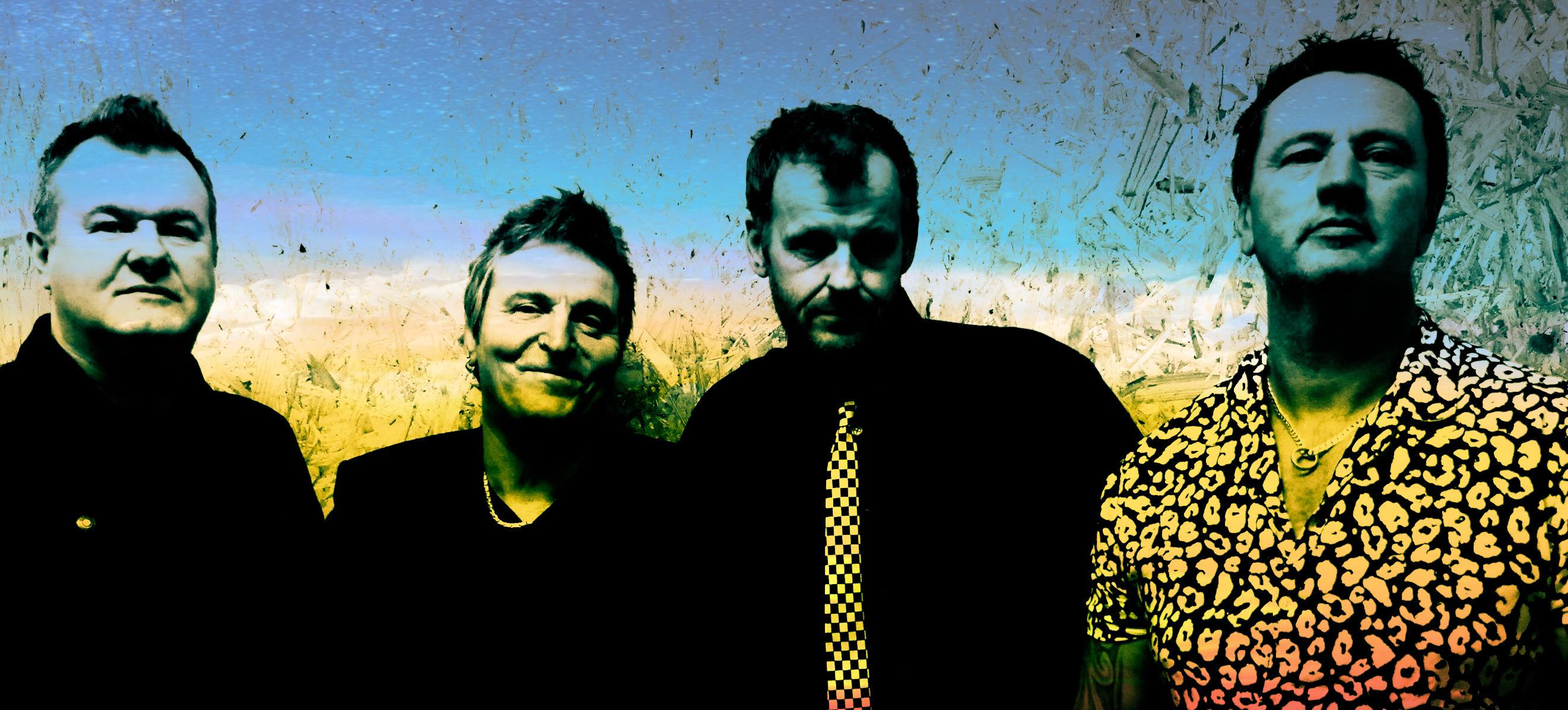
- Eddie & the Hot Rods 2021

Background information
- Also known as: The Rods
- Origin: Canvey Island, Essex, England
- Genres: Pub rock; punk rock; hard rock; power pop; proto-punk; post-punk; blues rock
- Years active: 1975–1985, 1996–present
- Labels: Island, EMI, Voiceprint, Wienerworld, RodHot Records
- Members: Simon Bowley; Ian "Dipster" Dean; Richard Holgarth; Mic Stoner
- Past members: Barrie Masters; Graeme Douglas; Paul Gray; Lew Lewis; Paul Curtis; Steve Nicol; Tony Cranney; Dave Higgs; Gary Loker; Gordon Russell; Chris Taylor; Pete Ward; Ian Nix; Rob Steele; Russ Strutter; Warren Kennedy; Tony Cranney; George Page; Tex Axile; Steve Walwyn; Mick Rogers; Madman Keyo; Jess Phillips/Steve Kehoe
- Website: eddieandthehotrods.com

Eddie and the Hot Rods are a pub rock band from Essex founded in 1975. They are best known for their 1977 UK top ten hit "Do Anything You Wanna Do", released under the shortened name Rods. The group broke up in 1985, but reformed in 1996. Singer Barrie Masters was the only constant member until his death in 2019. The band continued to tour, fronted by their former bassist, Ian 'Dipster' Dean.

== History ==
=== Formation ===
The band was formed in Westcliff-on-Sea, Essex, England, during 1975 by guitarist Dave Higgs (who had previously played in the Fix with Lee Brilleaux), with drummer Steve Nicol, bassist Rob Steele, and singer Barrie Masters (born in Rochford, Essex; 4 May 1956 – 2 October 2019).

Before rising to semi-stardom in 1977, the Hot Rods underwent several changes in personnel: one of the first members to leave the band was "Eddie" himself, which was a dummy that featured prominently in the Hot Rods' early gigs and was discarded as the joke had worn thin. Otherwise, the band consisted of Barrie Masters on vocals, Pete Wall and Dave Higgs on guitar, Rob Steele on bass and Steve Nicol on drums. Ed Hollis (brother of Talk Talk's Mark Hollis) became their manager.

In May 1975, after building a live reputation, they secured a Saturday-night residency at The Kensington in London. This was followed in October by a joint residency with the 101ers at The Nashville, playing alternate headline sets. In November, after positive press reviews of their live shows, they were signed by Island Records.

=== Commercial success ===
By 1976, Lew Lewis (harmonica) and Paul Gray (bass) had replaced Wall and Steele. Lewis's tenure in the group lasted for the release of their first two singles before he too left. With this new line-up, the Hot Rods played a set at London's famous Marquee Club – their opening act was the Sex Pistols which descended into chaos with the Pistols smashing the Hot Rods' gear; The Pistols' support slot earned them their first music press review, in the NME, with no mention of the headlining Hot Rods at all. By way of revenge, the Hot Rods claimed in the next week's edition of the NME to have "sacked" the Pistols from an upcoming tour, which the NME pithily described as "what you get for mixin(g) with real punks." During a residency at the club in the summer of 1976 they duelled for alternate weeks with AC/DC, to see who could cram more bodies into the Marquee during one of the hottest summers on record. They first appeared in the UK Singles Chart the end of that year with the Live at the Marquee EP and the single "Teenage Depression", an energetic rock and roll song.

After the release of the Teenage Depression album, which marked their debut appearance in the UK Albums Chart, they recorded another EP called Live – At the Sound of Speed. During the gig from which this EP was recorded, Graeme Douglas (formerly of the Kursaal Flyers) joined the band onstage and jammed along adding extra lead lines. Afterwards his membership of the band was made permanent, and they set about writing and recording for their second album. The live recording of the Sound of Speed EP featured Douglas on only one track, he therefore set about recording additional lead guitar overdubs in the studio, though to keep in with the essence of a live release, he was only given one attempt at recording each song.

With the addition of Douglas, the band was moved in a more radio-friendly direction. Their biggest hit came with the Douglas/Hollis collaboration "Do Anything You Wanna Do" in the summer of 1977, under their shorter, snappier name, the Rods. This single made the British Top 10 (number 9 in August 1977) and also proved popular with the then predominant punk audience, as did that year's album Life on the Line. They appeared at the Reading Festival held in August 1977 and also in that year the Hot Rods toured the United States with the Ramones and Talking Heads. In late 1977 they released a one-off collaboration with MC5 singer Rob Tyner as 'Rob Tyner & the Hot Rods'. When it came to recording a follow-up album, the band tried to recapture the success of "Do Anything You Wanna Do", but to no avail. The album, Life on the Line, hit further problems with CBS Records still having contractual claim over Douglas, leading to his picture being removed from the LP sleeve for some releases. In 1978 the band toured in Canada.

In early 1979, they released a further album with Douglas, entitled Thriller, recorded at Abbey Road Studio, which featured a fuller studio sound and used more studio effects. Due to disappointing sales, they found themselves dropped by Island in 1979, and in May that year were rumoured to be on the verge of splitting, with Gray touring with the Members and Masters and Nicol playing in the band Plus Support. They signed to EMI in August 1979, releasing a further album in 1981, Fish'n'Chips with new bass player T.C. (Tony Cranney), but disbanded in 1981.

=== Reformations ===
At this point, Gray and Douglas had already left the band, the former joining the Damned. Masters teamed up with the Inmates. Ed Hollis went on to work with some of the best known acts of the punk era including the Damned, Elvis Costello, and Stiff Little Fingers. Nicol joined One the Juggler.

Masters and Nicol re-formed the Hot Rods in 1984, with T.C. (Tony Cranney) bassplayer from the "Fish and Chips" album and new guitarist Warren Kennedy. This line-up recorded the single "Fought for You". Tony Cranney was later replaced By Russ Strutter for the live mini-LP One Story Town, before the band split again in 1985. Tex Axile, who had briefly been a member in this era, went on to join Transvision Vamp.

In 1992 the 'classic' line-up (Masters, Nicol, Higgs, and Gray) re-grouped for a European tour. Higgs left after the tour, but the band carried on with Steve Walwyn of Dr. Feelgood replacing him. Another Feelgood member, Gordon Russell was briefly a member, soon replaced by Mick Rodgers, a former member of Manfred Mann's Earth Band. In 1994 they recorded the album Gasoline Days, released in 1996 by Japanese label Creative Man. Several line-up changes followed, with members including Madman Keyo and Jess Phillips.

The new millennium saw a new line-up, still led by Masters but now comprising Simon Bowley on drums (nephew of original drummer Steve Nicol), Dipster Dean on bass and Gary Loker on guitar. In 2001, after an 80 date UK 'Naughty Rhythms' Tour (with Dr Feelgood, the Hamsters and John Otway) they were joined by Richard Holgarth (Otway) on guitar and shortly afterwards, Loker left the band.

In 2005, they recorded Better Late than Never in preparation for a 30th anniversary tour and then expanded to a five-piece band again with the addition of Chris Taylor in 2006 for the recording of the album Been There, Done That. This is the line-up that has since performed as Eddie and the Hot Rods.

Dave Higgs died in December 2013.

In early 2018, the band announced they would soon retire from headline tours. The band toured the UK in March 2019 opening for Stiff Little Fingers. Touring bass player for the March 2019 tour was Adam Smith of Newtown Neurotics.

A one-off celebration gig 'Done Everything We Wanna Do' took place at o2 Academy, Islington on 13 April 2019. which featured appearances from past members (Lew Lewis, Paul Gray, Steve Nicol, Graeme Douglas, Warren Kennedy, Chris Taylor, Tony Cranney), current members (Richard Holgarth, Simon Bowley, Dipster) and special guests Captain Sensible (The Damned), Leigh Heggarty (Ruts DC), Duncan Reid (The Boys), Dennis Greaves and Mark Feltham (Nine Below Zero) and JC Carroll (The Members) all joining frontman Barrie Masters.

Masters was found dead in his home on 1 October 2019, at the age of 63, having taken various intoxicants. A later inquest determined that his death was drug-related.

Having already announced that Barrie would be retiring at the end of the year due to health concerns and, after an enforced Covid pandemic break throughout 2020, the band decided to return to the stage in 2021 with long time bassist Ian 'Dipster' Dean taking over the vocal duties. Mic Stoner (Chords UK) replaced him on bass guitar and they undertook on a UK tour alongside Nine Below Zero.

=== Guardians of the Legacy ===
On 27 March 2022, they could be seen performing their new single "Guardians of the Legacy" on the Talking Pictures TV broadcast of The Heritage Chart Show with Mike Read. "Guardians of the Legacy" is the title track from an album issued on the anniversary of Masters' death in October 2022.

== Musical style ==
The band's early repertoire consisted of covers of 1960s R&B songs and original songs inspired by the likes of Dr. Feelgood. Known for their energy on stage, they attracted a younger audience than many pub rock bands. Although often categorised as one of the founding fathers of the punk era, they were simply interested in playing loud, fast, in-your-face rock and roll. The energy and attitude certainly endeared them to punks and Joe Strummer stated that when he read about the band in a listings magazine it was the first time he had seen the word 'punk' used to describe a band. Their 1977 tour of the US with the Ramones and Talking Heads was billed as a punk rock tour, and their 1977 concert in Windsor, Ontario, was billed as "Windsor's First Punk Rock Concert". They were overtaken by punk rock bands, however, and were soon considered to be outside the genre.

== Discography ==
=== Studio albums ===
Year	Album	UK Albums Chart	Record label
1976	Teenage Depression	43	Island Records
1977	Life on the Line	27	Island Records
1979	Thriller	50	Island Records
1981	Fish 'n' Chips	—	EMI Records
1996	Gasoline Days	—	Creative Man Records
2005	Better Late than Never	—	Voiceprint Records
2006	Been There, Done That...	—	Voiceprint Records
2011	35 Years of Teenage Depression	—	
2022	Guardians of the Legacy	—	Outro Records (Vinyl) Renaissance Records (CD)

=== Live albums ===
- One Story Town (1985), Waterfront
- BBC Radio 1 Live in Concert (1994), Windsong
- Live at the Paradiso (1998), Pub
- Get Your Rocks Off (2002), Jungle
- New York:Live (2009) Recorded live at Southpaw, Brooklyn.

=== Compilations and sessions ===
- Rods (1977) Promo (Live & Out-takes)
- Curse of the Hot Rods aka 1979 Freerange Studio – Covent Garden sessions (1992), Street Link
- Live and Rare (1993), Receiver
- Ties that Bind (1994), Dojo
- The End of the Beginning – the Best of Eddie & the Hot Rods (1994), Island
- Get Your Balls Off (1996), Skydog
- Doing Anything They Wanna Do... (1996), Anagram
- Take No Prisoners! The Best of British Punk (1998), Delta Music (UK)
- Do Anything You Wanna Do (2000), Spectrum
- The Singles Collection (2009), Captain Oi!
- Do Anything You Wanna Do: The Best Of (2012), Spectrum Music

=== EPs ===
- Live at the Marquee EP (1976), Island, IEP 2 – UK No. 43

1. "96 Tears"
2. "Get Out of Denver"
3. "Medley: Gloria – Satisfaction"

- At the Sound of Speed EP (1977), Island, IEP 5 – UK No. 56 (Note: Chart position is from the official UK "Breakers List".)

1. "Hard Drivin' Man"
2. "Horseplay"
3. "Double Checkin' Woman"
4. "All I Need is Money"
5. "On the Run" (on 12-inch version only)

=== Singles ===
Year	Title	Peak chart positions	Record Label	B-side	Album
Year	Title	UK	Record Label	B-side	Album
1976	"Writing on the Wall"	—	Island Records	"Cruisin' (In the Lincoln)"	
1976	"Wooly Bully"	—	Island Records	"Horseplay (Weary of the Schmaltz)"	
1976	"Teenage Depression"	35	Island Records	"Shake"	Teenage Depression
1977	"I Might Be Lying"	44	Island Records	"Ignore Them (Always Crashing in the Same Bar)"	
1977	"Do Anything You Wanna Do"	9	Island Records	"Schoolgirl Love"	Life on the Line
1977	"Till the Night Is Gone (Let's Rock)"	—	Island Records	"Flipside Rock"	
1977	"Quit This Town"	36	Island Records	"Distortion May Be Expected (laughbagindub)"	Life on the Line
1978	"Life on the Line"	55	Island Records	"Do Anything You Wanna Do" (Live)	Life on the Line
1979	"Media Messiahs"	—	Island Records	"Horror Through Straightness"	Thriller
1979	"The Power and the Glory"	—	Island Records	"Highlands One, Hopefuls Two"	Thriller
1980	"Wide Eyed Kids"	—	EMI Records	"Leave Us Alone"	Fish 'n' Chips
1981	"Farther on Down the Road (You Will Accompany Me)"	—	EMI Records	"Fish 'n' Chips Part 2"	Fish 'n' Chips
1985	"Fought for You"	—	Waterfront Records	"Hey, Tonight"	

=== DVDs ===
- Do Anything You Wanna Do (1996), Cherry Red
- Live 2005 (2006), Plastic Head
- Introspective (2009), Voiceprint
