= Stu West =

English bass guitarist

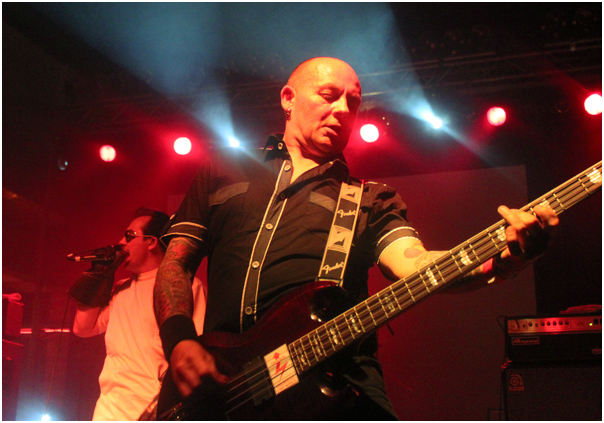
West with The Damned in 2011

Stu West (born 24 December 1964, Lincolnshire, England) was the bassist for the English punk band the Damned from 2004 to September 2017. He joined in 2004, when the past bassist, Patricia Morrison, left the band due to pregnancy. She had a daughter, Emily, by her long-time partner and Damned vocalist, Dave Vanian. Morrison never rejoined the band. West resigned from the band in July 2017, the longest serving bassist the band ever had. It was announced publicly on 11 September 2017, that West was no longer with the band, having been replaced by former longtime bassist Paul Gray.

West was actively involved in the thriving Peterborough, England punk scene of the 1980s/'90s. He was in the bands: Schutzhaft (vocals/bass, one demo), Uprising (vocals, released one rare demo single), Monks of Science (bass, one LP re-released as a special split CD with Default, "Inspirations and Escalations, 1987–1992"), Crack Babies (bass, one demo) punk/metal crossover band, English Dogs ("Bow To None" album 1994), Heads Apart (bass, one demo). The Damned (bass, one album "So Who's Paranoid" 2008 – Two singles, "Little Miss Disaster" 2005, "A Nation Fit For Heroes" 2010). West also still plays with Foxy, a female fronted punk rock ensemble from Orange County, California. Bassist from 2001–present ("Can't Stop Us" EP, 2018 & X-Ray Spex tribute single, 2019).

West is a keen photographer, rail enthusiast and a real ale fan (he can often be seen at the annual Peterborough Beer Festival).

Stu West lives in Banffshire.
