= Newtown Neurotics =

UK musical group

- Also known as: The Neurotics
- Origin: Harlow, England
- Genres: Punk
- Years active: 1979–1988, 2006–present
- Labels: Razor Records; Jungle Records; Cruel Binary; Cadiz Music
- Members: Steve Drewett; Adam Smith; Simon Lomond
- Past members: Colin Dredd; Don Adams; David Walsh; Tig Barber
- Website: newtownneurotics.com http://steve-drewett.com/

The Newtown Neurotics (later just The Neurotics) are an English punk rock group formed in Harlow, Essex, England, in 1979. They are noted for their openly political music.

== History ==
As Newtown Neurotics, the band began their career playing punk heavily indebted stylistically to The Clash and The Ramones. They released a series of singles from 1979 – later collected on the album 45 Revolutions per Minute – and debut album Beggars Can Be Choosers in 1983. Over the course of the 1980s, the band dropped the "Newtown" from its name and became simply The Neurotics; along with the name change came a stylistic broadening, including slower tempos and horn arrangements. They released several albums on noted UK postpunk label Jungle Records including Repercussions in 1986 and Is Your Washroom Breeding Bolsheviks in 1988.

Lead singer and guitarist Steve Drewett took openly socialist stances in his lyrics throughout the course of the band's career, and currently displays an anarcho-syndicalist sticker on his guitar. From 1986, the Neurotics became one of the first Western bands to play behind the Iron Curtain, with successive tours of East Germany alongside artists like Billy Bragg and Attila the Stockbroker.

When bassist Colin Dredd contracted pleurisy, he left the band; Mac (Travis Cut /The Pharaohs /The Skabilly Rebels) was brought in to play bass for some farewell shows (at which the band's entire catalogue was played), and the band called it quits in October 1988.

== Post break-up ==
Drewett went on to form "Afropunk" band The Indestructible Beat, which disbanded in 1995. Drewett also played sporadic solo gigs, including visits to North Korea and Cuba. He released his debut solo album KuJenga Society in 2015.

== Reformation ==
The band reformed as Newtown Neurotics for reunion shows in London and Brighton leading up to Blackpool's 2006 Wasted and 2008 Rebellion punk festivals. A new rhythm section of David Walsh (Drums) and Adam Smith (Bass) (Both from Harlow Newtown) backed Steve Drewett from 2007, including for the 2009 Rebellion Festival. In 2010 Steve Drewett made his first US appearance, playing at The Big Takeover magazine's 30th Anniversary festival.

In 2015, Simon Lomond rejoined the band for live dates including a return to the Rebellion Festival. Original bassist, Colin Dredd (Masters), died on 19 May 2015.

In 2018, funds for a full-length documentary on the band's history were successfully raised through Kickstarter. Kick Out!: The Newtown Neurotics Story is directed by Luke J. Baker. Initially set for completion in 2021, it finally premiered at London's 100 Club on 5 September 2023.

In 2022 the band released Cognitive Dissidents, their first album in 35 years. The single Climate Emergency preceded the album.

== Album discography ==
=== Newtown Neurotics ===
- Beggars Can Be Choosers (Razor Records) 1983
- 45 Revolutions per Minute: Singles 1979–1984 (Jungle) 1994
- Punk Singles Collection (Cherry Red Records) 2000
- Punk Collection (Captain Oi!) 2001
- Triumph Over Adversity (Live in 1987) (Cruel Binary) 2015
- The Elephant Demos (1980) (No Plan Records) 2018
- Cognitive Dissidents (Cadiz) 2022

=== Neurotics ===
- Repercussions (Jungle Records) 1986
- Kickstarting a Backfiring Nation (Jungle) 1987
- Is Your Washroom Breeding Bolsheviks (Jungle) 1988
- Never Thought EP (Jungle) 1988
- His Masters Voice – The Very Best Of 1992
- Daily Life... Enemies, Dreams, Memories of the Neurotic (Guttersnipe) 1998

=== Compilations featuring Neurotics' tracks ===
- Punk & Disorderly III – The Final Solution (Anagram Records) 1983 – Track "Kick Out The Tories"
- They Shall Not Pass (CNT Records) 1985 – Tracks "Mindless Violence" & "Kick Out The Tories"
- Wake UP (Womble Records) 1986 – Track "This Fragile Life" (live)
- Not Just Mandela (Davy Lamp Records) 1986 – Track "Africa" (with Billy Bragg)
- The Shit Factory (Warner) 1998 – Track "Living With Unemployment"

=== Uses in popular culture ===
- Stand-up comedian Tom Mayhew's BBC Radio 4 series - Tom Mayhew is Benefit Scum - used "Living With Unemployment" as its intro music.
