= Richard Holgarth =

British producer and guitar player

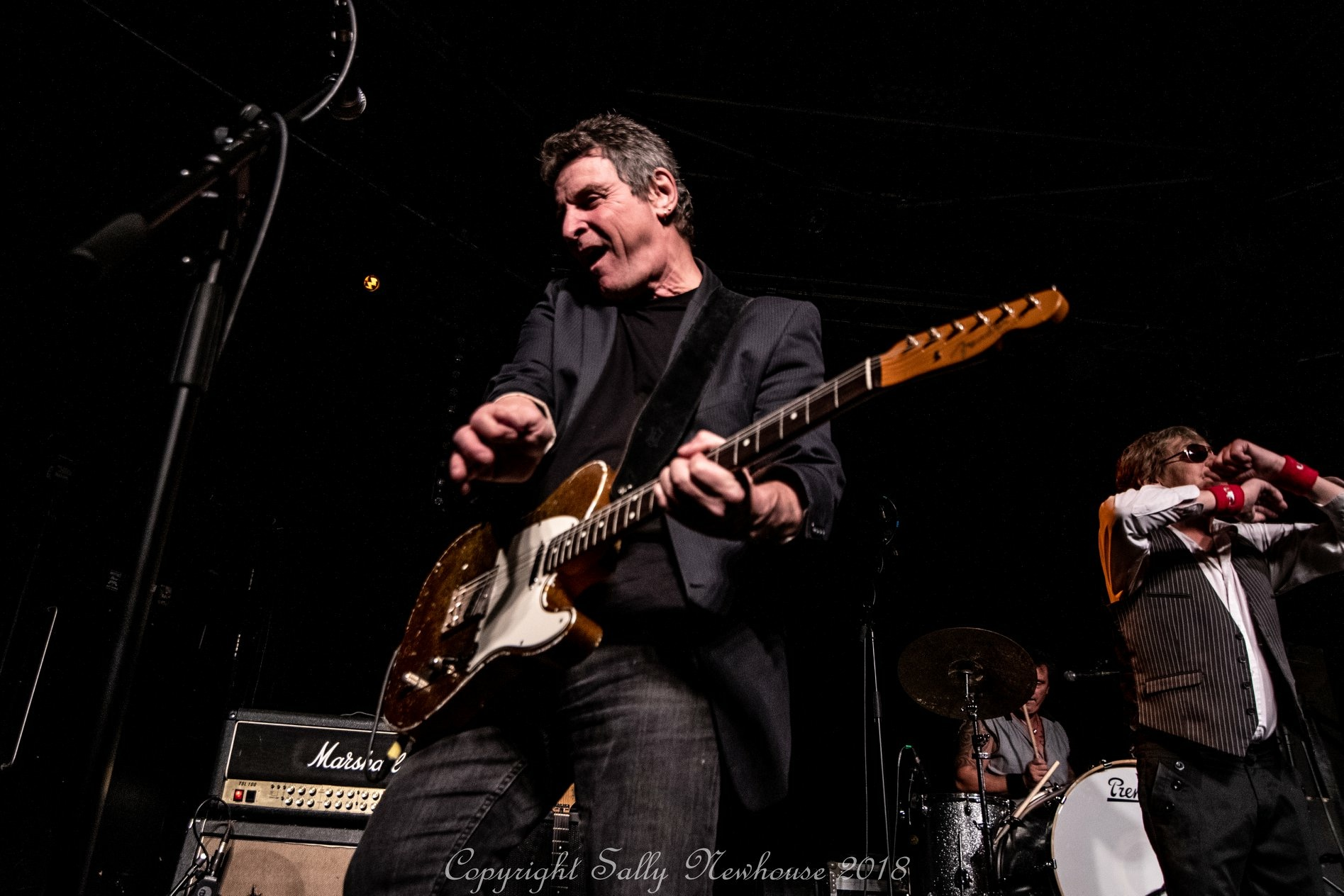

Richard Holgarth is a British producer and guitar player with Eddie and the Hot Rods and John Otway, as well as being the former co-owner of The Square; a music venue in Harlow, Essex.

== Instruments and performances ==
- 1979 The Gangsters - "Record Company" b/w "Harlow Town" - Stortbeat SP - guitar
- 1979 The Gangsters "The Gangsters" Stortbeat Beat LP - guitar
- 1979 The Gangsters "Best Friend" b/w "Best Friend Dub" - Stortbeat Beat SP - guitar
- 1984 Das and Chave "Personal Ads" - Davy Lamp EP - guitar
- 1985 Real by Reel/Austins Shirts "Blue/Giving Up JD For JC" - Davy Lamp EP - guitar/piano
- 1986 The Internationalists "Every Fifth Man" - Davy Lamp LP - guitar/keys
- 1986 The Internationalists "Let The Pressure Start" - Matchless Recs LP - guitar/keys
- 1986 The Pharaohs "Blue Egypt" - Nervous LP - piano
- 1991 Attila the Stockbroker "Donkeys Years" - Musidisc LP/CD - guitar/bass/keys
- 1991 Attila and John Otway "Cheryl - A Rock Opera" - Strike-Back Recs CD - guitar/bass/keys
- 1991 Attila and Otway "Cheryl" b..w "Trainspotter Rap" - Strike-Back Recs SP - guitar/bass/keys
- 1992 Attila the Stockbroker "668:The Neighbour Of The Beast" - Larrikin Recs LP/CD - guitar/bass/keys
- 1992 John Otway "Two Little Boys" - Otway Recs. OTWAYS1 CDS - guitar/bass/piano
- 1992 John Otway "Under The Covers And Over The Top" - Otway Recs CD - guitar/bass/keys
- 1992 Attila the Stockbroker "This Is Free Europe" - Terz Recs LP/CD - guitar/bass/keys
- 1992 Attila the Stockbroker "Never Ending Story - A Tribute to The Clash" (1 Track) - Released Emotions Recs LP/CD - guitargtr/bass/key
- 1993 John Otway & The Big Band "Live!" - Amazing Feet CD - guitar
- 1995 John Otway "Delilah - The Otway Sings Jones EP" - Strike-Back Recs CDS - guitar/bass/keys
- 1995 John Otway "Premature Adulation" - Amazing Feet CD - guitar/bass/keys
- 1999 John Otway & The Aylesbury Youth Orchestra "Birthday Boy/The Highwayman/Geneve" - Otway Recs CDS - guitar
- 1999 Attila the Stockbroker "The Pen And The Sword" - Roundhead Recs CD (7 tracks) - guitar/keys/prog
- 2000 The Pharaohs "London 1888" - Crazy Love Recs CD - piano/keys
- 2000 John Otway & The Big Band "The Set Remains The Same" - Otway Recs CD - guitar
- 2002 John Otway & The Big Band "Abbey Road Sessions" - U-Vibe Recs CD - guitar
- 2002 John Otway "Bunsen Burner - The Hit Mix" - U-Vibe Recs CDS - guitar
- 2003 John Otway "Scraps" - Otway Recs Triple CD (10 tracks) - guitar/bass/keys
- 2004 John Otway "Ot-air " - Otway Recs CD - guitar
- 2005 Eddie and the Hot Rods "Better Late Than Never" (UK) MSJ /Voiceprint Recs/(France) Bad Reputation CD - guitar/keys/piano
- 2006 Eddie and the Hot Rods "Been There, Done That…" - Voiceprint Recs CD - guitar
- 2006 Eddie and the Hot Rods "Right For The Night - Live" - Voiceprint Japan CD - guitar
- 2007 John Otway "The Ultimate and Pen-ultimate" - Microstar Double CD (14 tracks) - guitar/bass/keys
- 2007 John Otway "Bunsen Burner - The Album" - Microstar CD - guitar
- 2009 Eddie and the Hot Rods "New York:Live" - Hotrod Recs CD - guitar
- 2011 Eddie and the Hot Rods "35 Years of Teenage Depression" - Hotrod Recs CD - guitar
- 2014 Eddie and the Hot Rods "Two Sides" - Wienerworld WNRCD5073 CD - guitar
- 2015 John Caspi and the First Gun "Hanging Around" - Brighton Bar Records BBR 003 CD - Guitar
- 2017 Richard Holgarth "Finally" - RodHot Records RODHOT005CD CD - All Instruments/vocals
- 2017 John Otway and The Big Band "Montserrat" - Red Bowler Records RBLP001 CD/LP - Guitar/keyboards
- 2020 Eddie and the Hot Rods "Better Without You" - Angel Air SJPCD624 CD - Guitar
- 2022 Eddie and the Hot Rods "Guardians of the Legacy" - Hiljaiset Levyt HIKS-082 7"EP - Guitar
- 2023 Eddie and the Hot Rods "Guardians of the Legacy" - Outro/Rennaisance Records CD/LP - Guitar/Keyboards
- 2023 Eddie and the Hot Rods "Why Should I Care" - Hiljaiset Levyt 7"EP - Guitar
- 2024 John Otway and The Big Band "The Set Remains The Same - Live" - Red Bowler Records OTCD209 CD - Guitar

== Production ==
- 1990 The Redwoods "The Redwoods" - Davy Lamp LP
- 1991 Attila the Stockbroker "Donkeys Years" - Musidisc LP/CD
- 1991 Attila and John Otway "Cheryl - A Rock Opera" - Strike-Back Recs CD
- 1991 Attila and Otway "Cheryl" b..w "Trainspotter Rap" - Strike-Back Recs SP
- 1992 Attila the Stockbroker "668:The Neighbour Of The Beast" - Larrikin Recs LP/CD
- 1992 John Otway "Two Little Boys" - Otway Recs CDS
- 1992 John Otway "Under The Covers And Over The Top" - Otway Recs CD
- 1992 Attila the Stockbroker "This Is Free Europe" - Terz Recs LP/CD
- 1992 Attila the Stockbroker "Never Ending Story - A Tribute to The Clash" (1 Track) - Released Emotions Recs LP/CD
- 1992 The Indestructible Beat "Never Ending Story - A Tribute to The Clash" (1 Track) - Released Emotions Recs LP/CD
- 1993 John Otway & The Big Band "Live!" - Amazing Feet CD
- 1995 John Otway "Delilah - The Otway Sings Jones EP" - Strike-Back Recs CDS
- 1995 John Otway "Premature Adulation" - Amazing Feet CD
- 1996 The Sweeney "Pop Gun" - Rotator CD (2 tracks)
- 1997 Blyth Power "A Rededication Of Pastor Skull" - Downwarde Spiral CD
- 1998 Various Artists "Bootcamp Breakout" - Polymer Recs CD
- 1999 John Otway & The Aylesbury Youth Orchestra "Birthday Boy/The Highwayman/Geneve" - Otway Recs CDS
- 1999 Attila the Stockbroker "The Pen And The Sword" - Roundhead Recs CD (7 tracks)
- 2004 Eddie and the Hot Rods "Better Late Than Never" (UK) MSJ Recs/(UK) Voiceprint Recs/(France) Bad Reputation CD
- 2006 Eddie and the Hot Rods "Been There, Done That…" - Voiceprint Recs CD
- 2006 Eddie and the Hot Rods "Right For The Night - Live" - Voiceprint Japan CD
- 2006 Eddie and the Hot Rods "Live 2005" - Voiceprint Recs DVD
- 2007 John Otway "The Ultimate and Pen-ultimate" - Microstar 2CD (14 tracks)
- 2009 Eddie and the Hot Rods "New York:Live" - Hotrod Recs CD
- 2011 Eddie and the Hot Rods "35 Years of Teenage Depression" - Hotrod Recs CD
- 2017 Richard Holgarth "Finally" - RodHot Records RODHOT005CD CD
- 2020 Eddie and the Hot Rods "Better Without You" - Angel Air SJPCD624
- 2022 Eddie and the Hot Rods "Guardians of the Legacy" - Hiljaiset Levyt HIKS-082 7"EP
- 2023 Eddie and the Hot Rods "Guardians of the Legacy" - Outro/Rennaisance Records CD/LP
- 2023 Eddie and the Hot Rods "Why Should I Care" - Hiljaiset Levyt 7"EP
- 2024 John Otway and The Big Band "The Set Remains The Same - Live" - Red Bowler Records OTCD209 CD

== Video ==
- 1995 John Otway - "Live at the Square" VCR - guitar
- 2003 John Otway - "The Really Free Show - London Astoria" - Amazing Feet DVD - guitar
- 2005 The Hamsters "Burnin' Vermin" - Rockin' Rodent Recordings VCR/DVD - sound recording
- 2006 Eddie and the Hot Rods "Live 2005" - Voiceprint Recs. VPDVD21 DVD - producer/gtr
- 2006 The Hamsters, Wilko Johnson, John Otway - "The Mad, The Bad & The Dangerous" DVD - guitar
- 2014 John Otway - "ROCK AND ROLL'S GREATEST FAILURE" - DVD/Blu-ray - sound editor/contributor

== Film ==
- 2012 Otway the Movie (Dir. Steve Barker) - Sound Editor/Contributor

2023 “Kick Out!: The Newtown Neurotics Documentary” (Dir. Luke J. Baker) - Contributor
