= The Specials discography =

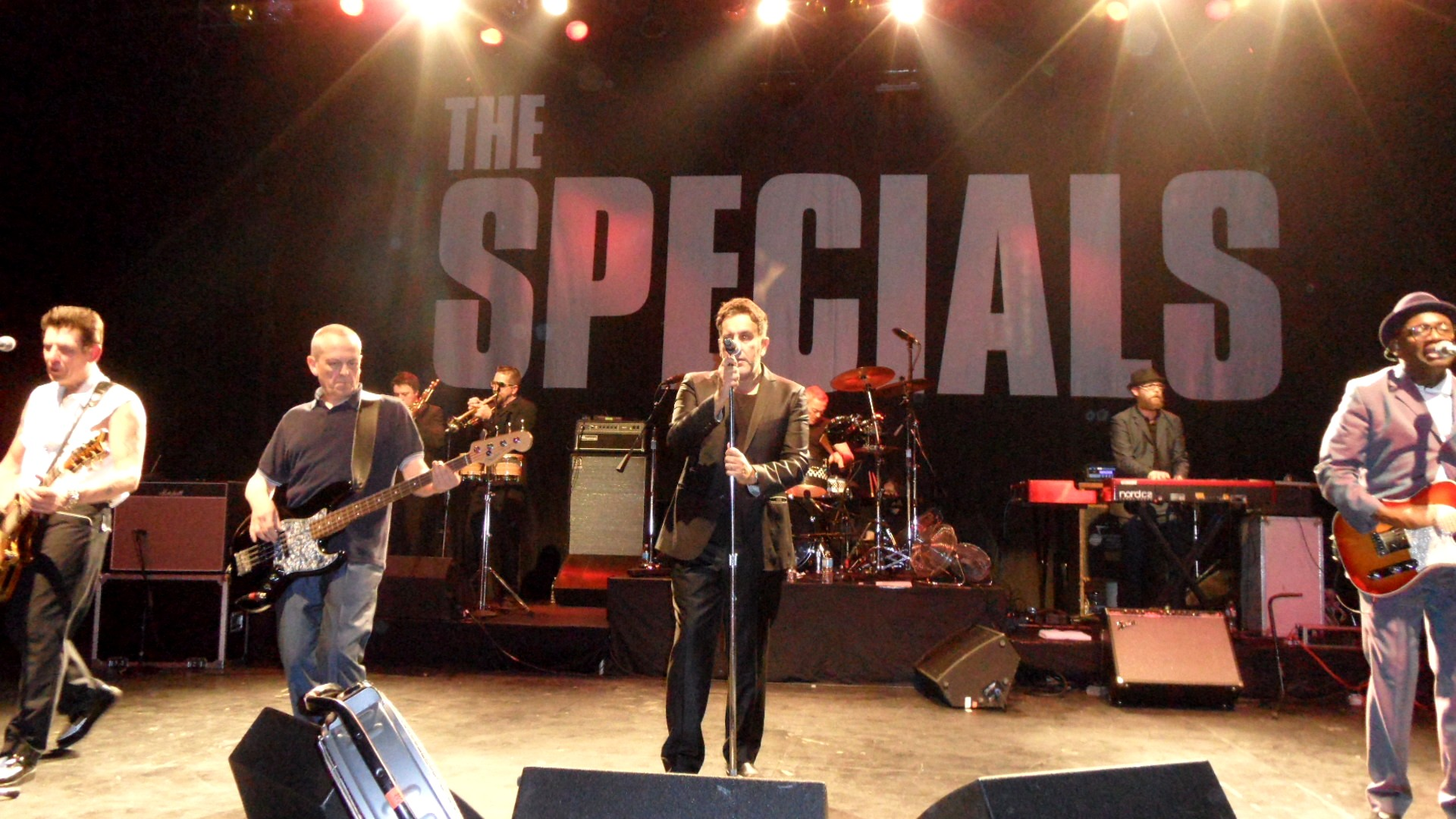
- The Specials performing live at the Vic Theatre in Chicago, IL in 2013
- Studio albums: 9
- Extended plays: 5
- Live albums: 7
- Compilation albums: 10
- Singles: 25
- Video albums: 5
- Collaboration album: 1

English ska revival band the Specials have released a diverse discography since their debut in 1979, including: nine studio albums, one collaboration album, seven live albums, eleven compilation albums, four extended plays, twenty-three singles, and filmed five videos.

Their debut album "The Specials" (1979) and "More Specials" (1980) both achieved Gold status, while their 2019 album "Encore" hit number 1 on the UK chart. The band collaborated with Desmond Dekker on the album "King of Kings" (1993). Their work spans various formats and has seen chart success in multiple countries.

== Albums ==
=== Studio albums ===
Title	Album details	Peak chart positions								Certifications
Title	Album details	UK	AUS	CAN	GER	NZ	SWE	SWI	US	Certifications
The Specials	Released: 19 October 1979; Label: 2 Tone; Formats: LP, MC, 8-track	4	20	21	—	5	34	—	84	BPI: Gold
More Specials	Released: 19 September 1980; Label: 2 Tone; Formats: LP, MC, 8-track	5	86	49	—	28	30	—	98	BPI: Gold
In the Studio (as the Special AKA)	Released: 15 June 1984; Label: 2 Tone; Formats: CD, LP, MC	34	—	—	—	—	—	—	—	
Today's Specials	Released: 15 April 1996; Label: Kuff/Virgin; Formats: CD, MC	—	—	—	—	—	—	—	—	
Guilty 'til Proved Innocent!	Released: 24 March 1998; Label: MCA; Formats: CD, LP, MC	—	—	—	—	—	—	—	—	
Skinhead Girl	Released: 17 October 2000; Label: Receiver; Formats: CD	—	—	—	—	—	—	—	—	
Conquering Ruler	Released: 13 February 2001; Label: Receiver; Formats: CD	—	—	—	—	—	—	—	—	
Encore	Released: 1 February 2019; Label: Island; Formats: CD, 2×CD, LP, 2×LP, digital download	1	—	—	20	—	—	—	—	BPI: Silver
Protest Songs 1924–2012	Released: 1 October 2021; Label: Island; Formats: CD, LP, MC, digital download	2	—	—	47	—	—	85	—	
"—" denotes releases that did not chart or were not released in that territory.

=== Collaboration albums ===
Title	Album details
King of Kings (with Desmond Dekker)	Released: 8 November 1993; Label: Trojan; Formats: CD, LP

=== Live albums ===
Title	Album details	Peak chart positions
Title	Album details	UK
Live at the Moonlight Club	Released: 30 March 1992; Label: 2 Tone; Formats: CD, LP, MC	—
Live – Too Much Too Young	Released: 6 April 1992; Label: Receiver; Formats: CD, LP, MC	—
BBC Radio 1 Live in Concert	Released: 21 December 1992; Label: Windsong International; Formats: CD; Split album with the Selecter	—
Blue Plate Specials Live	Released: 23 February 1999; Label: Big Ear Music; Formats: CD	—
Ghost Town Live	Released: September 1999; Label: Receiver; Formats: CD	—
More... Or Less: The Specials Live	Released: 6 August 2012; Label: Chrysalis; Formats: 2×CD, 2×LP	109
Live from the Cathedral	Released: 10 July 2026; Label: Island; Formats: 6×CD, 3×LP	30
"—" denotes releases that did not chart or were not released in that territory.

=== Compilation albums ===
Title	Album details	Peak chart positions	Certifications
Title	Album details	UK	Certifications
Singles / The Singles Collection	Released: 29 January 1991; Label: 2 Tone; Formats: CD, LP, MC	10	BPI: Gold
Dawning of a New Era (as the Coventry Automatics aka the Specials)	Released: March 1994; Label: Receiver; Formats: CD, LP	—	
Too Much Too Young: The Gold Collection	Released: 13 May 1996; Label: EMI Gold; Formats: CD, MC	—	BPI: Gold
Best of the Specials	Released: September 1996; Label: Disky; Formats: CD	—	
Concrete Jungle (as the Specials and Friends)	Released: March 1998; Label: Receiver; Formats: 2×CD	—	
BBC Sessions	Released: 26 October 1998; Label: EMI; Formats: CD	—	
A Special Collection	Released: October 1999; Label: EMI; Formats: CD	—	
Stereo-Typical: A's, B's and Rarities	Released: 28 August 2000; Label: EMI; Formats: 3×CD	—	BPI: Silver
Archive	Released: 26 March 2001; Label: Rialto; Formats: CD	—	
The Best of The Specials	Released: 31 March 2008; Label: Rhino; Formats: CD+DVD	24	BPI: Gold
"—" denotes releases that did not chart or were not released in that territory.

== EPs ==
Title	EP details	Peak chart positions						Certifications
Title	EP details	UK	UK Indie	BEL (FLA)	IRE	NL	NZ	Certifications
Too Much Too Young – The Special A.K.A. Live! (Note: This EP is credited as the Special AKA featuring Rico. In some countries, such as France and Germany, the EP was instead released as a 7-inch single consisting of "Too Much Too Young" as the A-side and "Guns of Navarone" as the B-side.)	Released: 18 January 1980; Label: 2 Tone; Formats: 7", 12"	1	—	11	3	15	47	BPI: Silver
The Peel Sessions	Released: February 1987; Label: Strange Fruit; Formats: 12", MC	—	17	—	—	—	—	
2 Tone EP (Note: The 2 Tone EP is a various artists EP that features "Gangsters" as the first track.)	Released: 27 September 1993; Label: 2 Tone; Formats: 7", CD, MC	30	—	—	—	—	—	
Too Much Too Young – The Specials E.P. Live!	Released: 21 April 2012; Label: 2 Tone; Formats: 7"; Live re-recording of original 1980 EP	—	—	—	—	—	—	
Dub Mixes Exclusive	Released: 24 October 2020; Label: 2 Tone; Formats: 10"; Record Store Day release	—	—	—	—	—	—	
"—" denotes releases that did not chart.

== Singles ==
Title	Year	Peak chart positions										Certifications	Album
Title	Year	UK	AUS	AUT	BEL (FLA)	IRE	NL	NOR	NZ	US Alt	US Dance	Certifications	Album
"Gangsters" (Note: Credited as the Special AKA.)	1979	6	—	—	6	27	11	—	20	—	—	BPI: Silver	Non-album single
"A Message to You Rudy" / "Nite Klub" (Note: Both sides credited as the Specials featuring Rico.)	1979	10	29	7	24	19	35	—	29	—	—	BPI: Platinum	The Specials
"Rat Race" / "Rude Buoys Outa Jail"	1980	5	—	—	—	17	—	—	—	—	89		Non-album single
"Stereotype" / "International Jet Set"	1980	6	—	—	—	12	41	—	—	—	—		More Specials
"Do Nothing" / "Maggie's Farm" (Note: "Do Nothing" is credited as the Specials featuring Rico with the Ice Rink String Sounds.)	1980	4	—	—	—	13	—	—	—	—	—	BPI: Silver	More Specials Non-album track
"Sock It to Them J.B." (Note: "Sock It to Them J.B." was only released as a single in France.)	1981	—	—	—	—	—	—	—	—	—	—		More Specials
"Concrete Jungle" (live) (Note: "Concrete Jungle" was only released as a single in the Netherlands.)	1981	—	—	—	—	—	—	—	—	—	—		Dance Craze (soundtrack)
"Ghost Town"	1981	1	68	—	15	3	12	7	20	—	—	BPI: Platinum	Non-album singles
"The Boiler" (Note: Credited as Rhoda with the Special AKA.)	1982	35	—	—	—	—	—	—	—	—	—		Non-album singles
"Jungle Music" (Note: Credited as Rico and the Special AKA.)	1982	—	—	—	—	—	—	—	—	—	—		Non-album singles
"War Crimes"	1982	84	—	—	—	—	—	—	—	—	—		In the Studio
"Racist Friend" / "Bright Lights"	1983	60	—	—	—	—	—	—	—	—	—		In the Studio
"Free Nelson Mandela" / "Break Down the Door"	1984	9	66	—	8	6	9	—	1	—	34		In the Studio
"What I Like Most About You Is Your Girlfriend"	1984	51	—	—	—	—	—	—	—	—	—		In the Studio
"Free Nelson Mandela" (re-recording) (Note: Credited as the Special AKA featuring Ndonda Khuze and Jonas Gwangwa.)	1988	93	—	—	—	—	—	—	—	—	—		Non-album single
"Jamaica Ska" (Note: Credited as Desmond Dekker and the Specials.)	1993	—	—	—	—	—	—	—	—	—	—		King of Kings
"Coz I Luv You" (Note: Credited as the X Specials.)	1994	—	—	—	—	—	—	—	—	—	—		Non-album single
"Hypocrite" (Note: Credited as the Specials featuring Kendell Smith and Sheena Staple.)	1995	66	—	—	—	—	—	—	—	—	—		Today's Specials
"Pressure Drop"	1996	100	—	—	—	—	—	—	—	—	—		Today's Specials
"A Little Bit Me, a Little Bit You" (Note: "A Little Bit Me, A Little Bit You" was only released as a single in the US.)	1996	—	—	—	—	—	—	—	—	—	—		Today's Specials
"It's You"	1998	—	—	—	—	—	—	—	—	29	—		Guilty 'til Proved Innocent!
"Bonediggin'" (Note: "Bonediggin'" was only released as a promotional single in the US.)	1998	—	—	—	—	—	—	—	—	—	—		Guilty 'til Proved Innocent!
"Sock It to Them J.B." (dub) / "Rat Race" (dub) (Note: Record Store Day release.)	2014	—	—	—	—	—	—	—	—	—	—		Non-album single
"Vote for Me"	2018	—	—	—	—	—	—	—	—	—	—		Encore
"10 Commandments" / "You're Wondering Now" (live) (Note: "10 Commandments" features Saffiyah Khan, whilst "You're Wondering Now" is a live version from 2009 and features Amy Winehouse.)	2019	—	—	—	—	—	—	—	—	—	—		Encore Non-album track
"—" denotes releases that did not chart or were not released in that territory.

== Compilation contributions ==
Title	Release date	Label
The Specials vs. The Untouchables: Ska's Greatest Stars	2002	Big Eye Music
80's New Wave Hits – Rearrangement of The Go-Go's' "Our Lips Are Sealed", with Jane Wiedlin, originally on The Specials vs The Untouchables: Ska's Greatest Stars	2006	Big Eye Music

== Videography ==
- "Dance Craze – The Best of British Ska... Live!" (VHS)
- "The Special AKA on Film" (1981 VHS & Laserdisc)
- "The Specials: Too Much, Too Young" (2008 DVD)
- "The Best of the Specials" (CD/DVD 2008)
- "The Specials – 30th Anniversary Tour" (2009 DVD)

== Films ==
- Sixteen Candles (1984) – song – "Little Bitch"
- Natural Born Killers (1994) – song – "Ghost Town" (not included on the soundtrack album)
- Multiplicity (1996) – song – "A Little Bit Me, A Little Bit You"
- Grosse Pointe Blank (1997) – songs – "Pressure Drop", "A Message to You, Rudy" and "You're Wondering Now"
- SLC Punk! (1998) – songs – "Too Hot" and "Gangsters"
- 200 Cigarettes (1999) – song – "A Message to You, Rudy"
- Mystery Men (1999) – song – "Gangsters" (covered by Citizen King)
- A Room for Romeo Brass (1999) – song – "A Message to You, Rudy"
- An Extremely Goofy Movie (2000) – song – "Pressure Drop"
- Snatch (2000) – song – "Ghost Town"
- Garage Days (2002) – song – "Ghost Town"
- Shaun of the Dead (2004) – song – "Ghost Town"
- This Is England (2006) – songs – "Do the Dog", "Pressure Drop"
- We Own The Night (2007) – song – "A Message to You, Rudy"
- Vivarium (2019) – song – "A Message to You, Rudy"

== Television ==
- Father Ted – Episode – Think Fast, Father Ted – song – "Ghost Town"
- Six Feet Under – song – "Monkey Man"
- Misfits (TV series) – song – "A Message to You Rudy"

== Commercials ==
- The song "A Message to You, Rudy" was featured in a SFR television commercial directed by Bruno Aveillan, with world champion football player, Marcel Desailly in 2001
- The song "Blank Expression" was featured in a Ford Fiesta television commercial in 2003

== Video games ==
- Dance Dance Revolution – song – "Little Bitch" (remix)
- MLB 2K7 – Song – "A Message To You, Rudy"
- Skate 2 – Song – "Ghost Town"
