= The Singles Collection (The Specials album) =

- UK cover

Greatest hits album by The Specials
- Released: 29 January 1991
- Genre: Ska, 2 Tone, new wave
- Length: 58:09
- Label: 2 Tone/Chrysalis

The Specials chronology
| In the Studio (1984) | The Singles Collection (1991) | Too Much Too Young: The Gold Collection (1996) |

Alternative Cover
- US cover

Professional ratings
Review scores
| Source | Rating |
|---|---|
| Allmusic | 5/5 stars |

The Singles Collection is a compilation album by The Specials.

== Track listing ==
| No. | Title | Writer(s) | Length |
|---|---|---|---|
| 1. | "Gangsters" (as The Special A.K.A.) | Jerry Dammers, The Specials, Prince Buster | 2:45 |
| 2. | "Rudy, A Message to You" (as The Specials (featuring Rico)) | R. Thompson | 2:50 |
| 3. | "Nite Club" | Jerry Dammers, The Specials | 3:25 |
| 4. | "Too Much Too Young (Live)" (as The Special A.K.A.) | Jerry Dammers, Lloyd Charmers | 2:05 |
| 5. | "Guns of Navarone (Live)" (as The Special A.K.A.) | Dimitri Tiomkin, Paul Francis Webster | 2:20 |
| 6. | "Rat Race" | Roddy Radiation | 3:09 |
| 7. | "Rude Boys Outta Jail" | Lynval Golding, Neville Staple, Horace Panter | 2:40 |
| 8. | "Maggie's Farm" | Bob Dylan | 3:31 |
| 9. | "Do Nothing" (as The Specials (featuring Rico)) | Lynval Golding | 3:52 |
| 10. | "Stereotype" | Jerry Dammers | 3:50 |
| 11. | "Ghost Town (Extended version)" (as The Specials (featuring Rico) | Jerry Dammers | 5:59 |
| 12. | "Why?" | Lynval Golding | 3:54 |
| 13. | "Friday Night, Saturday Morning" | Terry Hall | 3:34 |
| 14. | "Racist Friend" (as The Special A.K.A.) | Jerry Dammers, Dick Cuthell, John Bradbury | 3:48 |
| 15. | "Free Nelson Mandela (Extended Version)" (as The Special A.K.A.) | Jerry Dammers, Rhoda Dakar | 4:34 |
| 16. | "(What I Like Most About You Is Your) Girlfriend" (as The Special A.K.A.) | Jerry Dammers | 4:03 |

- Track 10 presents only the first half of the "Stereotype/Stereotype Pt. 2" single from More Specials.
- Tracks 14 through 16 were originally recorded under the "Special AKA" name, which the band used following the split of the original lineup in 1981.
- Some pressings of the album are missing track 16.

== Tracks listing for 'Singles' release ==
| No. | Title | Writer(s) | Length |
|---|---|---|---|
| 1. | "Gangsters" | Jerry Dammers, The Specials, Prince Buster | 2:45 |
| 2. | "Rudy, A Message to You" | R. Thompson | 2:50 |
| 3. | "Nite Klub" | Jerry Dammers, The Specials | 3:25 |
| 4. | "Too Much Too Young (Live)" | Jerry Dammers, Lloyd Charmers | 2:05 |
| 5. | "Guns of Navarone (Live)" | Dimitri Tiomkin, Paul Francis Webster | 2:20 |
| 6. | "Rat Race" | Roddy Radiation | 3:09 |
| 7. | "Stereotype" | Jerry Dammers | 3:50 |
| 8. | "International Jet Set" | Jerry Dammers | 4:11 |
| 9. | "Do Nothing" | Lynval Golding | 3:52 |
| 10. | "Ghost Town" | Jerry Dammers | 5:59 |
| 11. | "Why?" | Lynval Golding | 3:54 |
| 12. | "Friday Night, Saturday Morning" | Terry Hall | 3:34 |
| 13. | "War Crimes" (as The Special A.K.A.) | Jerry Dammers | 4:03 |
| 14. | "Racist Friend" (as The Special A.K.A.) | Jerry Dammers, Dick Cuthell, John Bradbury | 3:48 |
| 15. | "Nelson Mandela" (as The Special A.K.A.) | Jerry Dammers, Rhoda Dakar | 4:34 |
| 16. | "(What I Like Most About You Is Your) Girlfriend" (as The Special A.K.A.) | Jerry Dammers | 4:02 |

This 1991 pressing replaces "Maggie's Farm" and "Rude Boys Outta Jail" with "International Jet Set" and "War Crimes".
