= Dawning of a New Era =

Coventry Automatics AKA The Specials: Dawning of a New Era

Compilation album by The Specials
- Released: March 1994
- Recorded: 1978
- Genre: Ska, 2 Tone, new wave
- Label: Receiver Records

The Specials chronology
The Singles Collection (1991)	Coventry Automatics AKA The Specials: Dawning of a New Era (1994)	Too Much Too Young: The Gold Collection (1996)

Professional ratings
Review scores
Source	Rating
Allmusic	3/5 stars

Dawning of a New Era is an album credited to "The Coventry Automatics AKA The Specials", first released in 1993. The album is a collection of demo recordings from 1978, when the band was still known as "The Automatics". They would shortly rename themselves "The Coventry Automatics" before eventually becoming "The Specials". The release is notable for featuring an early lineup of the band, featuring original drummer Silverton Hutchinson and before the addition of toaster Neville Staple. It was also the first release of recordings of three songs not otherwise recorded by the band, "Wake Up", "Look But Don't Touch" and "Jay Walker". "Rock & Roll Nightmare" was retitled "Pearl's Cafe" and appeared on the "More Specials" album (featuring Rhoda Dakar on additional vocals).

== Track listing ==
No.	Title	Writer(s)	Length
1.	"Wake Up"	Unknown artist	1:53
2.	"Nite Klub/Raquel"	Horace Panter, Jerry Dammers, John Bradbury, Lynval Golding, Neville Staple, Rod Byers, Terry Hall	3:01
3.	"Rock & Roll Nightmare"	Unknown artist	2:00
4.	"Look But Don't Touch"	Unknown artist	4:23
5.	"Concrete Jungle"	Byers	3:43
6.	"It's Up to You"	Panter, Dammers, Bradbury, Golding, Staple, Byers, Hall	3:00
7.	"Stupid Marriage"	Dammers, Michael Allen Harrison, Staple	2:47
8.	"Blank Expression"	Panter, Dammers, Bradbury, Golding, Staple, Byers, Hall	2:07
9.	"Too Much Too Young"	Dammers	2:05
10.	"Little Bitch"	Dammers	2:40
11.	"(Dawning of A) New Era"	Dammers	2:41
12.	"Jay Walker"	Unknown artist	3:13

== Personnel ==
- Keyboards – Jerry Dammers
- Rhythm Guitar, Backing Vocals – Lynval Golding
- Lead Guitar – Roddy 'Radiation' Byers*
- Bass – 'Sir' Horace 'Gentleman' Panter*
- Drums – Silverton Hutchinson
- Vocals – Terry Hall
- Liner Notes – Laurence Cane-Honeysett
