= More Specials =

Studio album by the Specials
- Released: 19 September 1980
- Recorded: Summer 1980
- Studios: Horizon Studios, Coventry
- Genres: Ska; two-tone; post-punk; lounge; avant-pop
- Length: 45:32
- Label: 2 Tone Records
- Producers: Jerry Dammers, Dave Jordan

The Specials chronology
The Specials (1979)	More Specials (1980)	In the Studio (1984)

Singles from More Specials
- 1. "Stereotype" Released: September 1980; 2. "Do Nothing" Released: 5 December 1980

More Specials is the second album by English ska band the Specials, released by 2 Tone Records in September 1980. After the success of the band's debut album, band member Jerry Dammers assumed the role as the band's leader and stirred them into expanding their 2 Tone sound into other genres of music, most prominently a lounge music and easy listening style inspired by Muzak. Several band members disagreed with Dammers' vision and brought their own influences to the album, including from northern soul and rockabilly, contributing to an eclectic sound palette. The relations between band members continued to sour into the album's accompanying tour and most of the band departed in 1981.

The album features collaborations with the Go-Go's members Belinda Carlisle, Charlotte Caffey, and Jane Wiedlin; Rhoda Dakar from the Bodysnatchers; and Lee Thompson from Madness. The lyrics on the album, as with the band's debut album, are often intensely political. Upon its release, the album alienated some fans, but reached number 5 on the UK Albums Chart, while its singles reached the top 10 of the UK Singles Chart. The album also reached number 98 on the Billboard 200 albums chart. Critics greeted the album with praise, where journalists felt the album marked a bold step for the band. It has been since cited as an influence on the trip hop genre in the 1990s, and has been re-released several times.

== Background ==
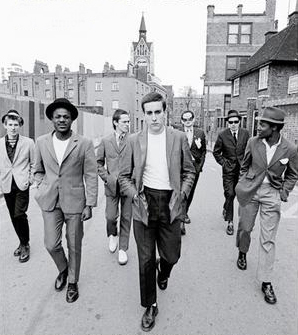
The Specials, circa 1979–80

Formed in Coventry in 1977, the Specials were the originators of 2 Tone music, a style that mixed the Jamaican genres of ska and reggae with the attitude and energy of punk rock and a focus on politically and socially conscious lyrics. They began 2 Tone Records, partly named for the band's multiracial line-up, on which they released their debut single "Gangsters" in 1979, which reached the UK Singles Chart top 10. The subsequent debut album The Specials (1979) was a critical and commercial success, while the Too Much Too Young EP released in early 1980 reached number one on the UK Singles Chart.

By early-mid-1980, after six months of touring, the band were physically exhausted and felt they could not sustain the large amount of energy required to be in the band, but they had a schedule to adhere to; Chrysalis Records, the owner of 2 Tone Records, were hurrying the band into recording their second album, while managers wanted the band to tour in Europe, Japan and the United States. Various deals, including large concerts, TV programmes and a feature film, also needed to be discussed. Bassist Horace Panter recalled: "Decisions needed to be made, and all we wanted to do was sleep. We didn't have any choice. We had to learn to enjoy the ride or get off, and nobody wanted to get off!"

A new single was required, so the band released "Rat Race", written by guitarist Roddy Byers as a critique on how privileged students "would spend three years pissing it up in college, knowing full well that Daddy would get them a good job when they left no matter what." With Linton Kwesi Johnson's "Me Wan' Fi Go Rave" as a musical starting point, band founder and keyboardist Jerry Dammers added a plucked piano intro inspired by John Barry, foreshadowing his primary direction on More Specials. The single was a success, reaching number 5 on the UK charts. Meanwhile, drummer John Bradbury wanted to record a solo single, a cover version of the northern soul track "Sock It to 'em J.B.", imagining the titular initials changing from James Bond to John Bradbury. The band recorded it with him at Tulse Hill, and though it was not released as a single, it did make it onto More Specials.

For the band's second album, Dammers wanted to move the band's sound forward, away from ska and towards new territory. He declared: "It's time for 2-Tone bands to begin getting experimental. Some of the home-grown ska has started to become a cliche. We've got to start all over again." He reflected years later: "Ska was just a launching point. I didn't want us to end up like Bad Manners." For Dammers, this change meant he could pursue his fascination with easy listening and mood music, both "background sounds not designed for active listening, but which, if you paid attention, turned out to be weird, even creepy," according to writer Simon Reynolds. In particular, he was interested in Muzak. Band member Neville Staple said this was a reflection of the band's constant touring abroad: "We were in aeroplanes too much, man, and hotels! We were hearing that kind of elevator music, those drum-machine beats, everywhere we went. You soak up what surrounds you." In Dammers' own recollection, he had been inspired by listening to the styles while on tour in America in particular; in 2009, he reflected:

"On that tour in America, I was listening to music in the hotel bars and elevators. Vibraphone music in elevators. Obviously this was classed as rubbish. I don't know if it was my state of mind, because I was so zonked, but it struck me as a really weird, psychedelic music, which is now called lounge or exotica. It's been rehabilitated, but at the time, to say you actually liked that music was mad. It completely freaked out some of the band."

== Recording ==
Unlike the first Specials album, which was produced by Elvis Costello in a raw fashion, Jerry Dammers himself produced More Specials with Dave Jordan, except for "Sock It to 'em J.B." which was produced by Bradbury. It was recorded during summer 1980 at Coventry's Horizon Studios and mixed at Wessex Studios in London. In contrast to the first album, More Specials was predominately crafted in the studio, as, in his pursuit of musical perfection, Dammers had become infatuated with the idea of a recording studio and the possibilities it presented for numerous overdubs and fine tuning. Consequently, More Specials is more producer-dominated than the band's previous work. According to Panter, Dammers would listen to any music with an open mind, feeling that no matter whether he initially thought the music was good or bad, he would grow to like it with repeated plays. His ambition with More Specials was to destroy people's preconceived ideas of good and bad music to the point where listeners would hear a record and "won't even know if they like it or not." Panter said the band's intention was to become "more international."

"The ideas and the vision that we’d had the year previously had dissipated. Jerry didn’t have the songs, Roddy was coming up with all these punk/power pop songs that just weren’t going to work and he was pulling his face about ‘what’s wrong with my songs?’ and everybody was tired and just becoming fractious."

— Horace Panter

Several band members opposed Dammers' proposed "Muzak-lounge jazz experiment". Byers was moving into a different direction in his fusions of ska with rockabilly, contributing to a difference of opinion which destroyed his friendship with Dammers. While Byers acknowledged Dammers as having had the determination and vision to start the band, he felt he wanted to dominate the band and "run everything himself," with group manager Rick Rogers serving merely to interpret Dammers' ideas. The guitarist stated he wanted to start his own band to play his rockabilly-styled rock and roll, which would have been stylistically consistent with acts like Stray Cats who were becoming popular in London. Consequently, he had begun creating songs in punk rock and power pop styles, while Bradbury's interest in northern soul remained intact, thus contributing to the varied sound of the final album.

Regardless, as Dammers was the band's production mastermind, he dominated the recording. Byers reflected that, with More Specials, the Specials "went from With the Beatles to Sgt. Pepper's without doing Rubber Soul," a comment Panter found to be "very pertinent," who noted that: "[Dammers would] often say we've done that, now let's do something else. And other people would say, hey we've got this great thing going on here, why are we doing something different? That was probably the beginning of the fracturing of the band." During recording, Dammers had a heated row with Bradbury, who wanted to do a "2 Tone review, mixing ska, soul and reggae," which Panter also advocated. Recording was also hindered by outside interference, including when a journalist entered the studio to interview the band, who felt the interruption had sabotaged the "vibe" of the song they were working on. Further contributing factors to the dark tone of More Specials were the drink and drug-related issues within the band, racial squabbles in the audience of the band's live shows and guitarist Lynval Golding being victim to a violent racist attack.

For his experiments in Muzak, the "cheesy" tone of the pre-recorded rhythms on Dammers' newly bought Yamaha home organ, especially the Latin-America rhythms, were integral to his vision. For the Muzak-style tracks, including "Stereotypes", "I Can't Stand It" and "International Jet Set", the band sacrificed the live 'ensemble' recording of their first album for a "one instrument at a time" multitrack recording style, firstly laying down the keyboard and drum tracks, then adding bass, then guitar, and so on, contributing to a "totally different feel to the music" that Panter disliked.

== Composition ==
More Specials is more adventurous than the band's debut, given the disparate influences of their members, and comprises an eclectic mix of songs written by different members, including Terry Hall's first composition, several cover versions, Dammers' experiments in muzak and electronica and some "rockabilly mod" material from Byers. Louder Than War wrote that the album was "ambitious and totally unique, expanding the group’s musical palette into areas never previously explored in 'rock' music," citing the inclusion of gloomy lounge, dub reggae, muzak, dark exotica, calypso, bossa nova, northern soul and Spaghetti Western music. The group also incorporated inflections of jazz and soul into their sound, and flourishes of Mariachi flugelhorn are provided by guest musician Dick Cuthell. Simon Reynolds described the record as a "ragbag of revivalisms" and "a motley compromise" between band members. More Specials is split into two distinct sides; Panter stated that side one is the "songs side" and side two is the "muzak side."

The album is nonetheless dominated by Dammers and his Muzak-inspired direction, to the extent where The Rough Guide to Rock considers the record to be a venture into lounge music, while critic Scott Plagenhoef describes the album as "lounge-inspired post-punk." Dammers saw his contributions as "a DIY punk appropriation of Muzak." His preferential musical textures on More Specials are, according to Nick Reynolds of BBC Music, "odd and particularly British," citing the "basic rhythm boxes, brass sections in full cry, and a variety of cheesy keyboards and fairground and cinema organs." The record has also been described as avant-pop. Contrasting the often upbeat music, the record's lyrics are comparably bleak, depicting English life "in all its drab, suffocating despair and there's no way out," according to Nick Reynolds. John Lewis of Uncut wrote that, compared to the "teenage male fear writ large" on the band's first album, More Specials "presents a dread that’s more existential than adolescent." Critic Vivien Goldman nonetheless commented that the band's bleak world view is presented with humour: "This may be the funniest record of 1980."

=== Side one ===
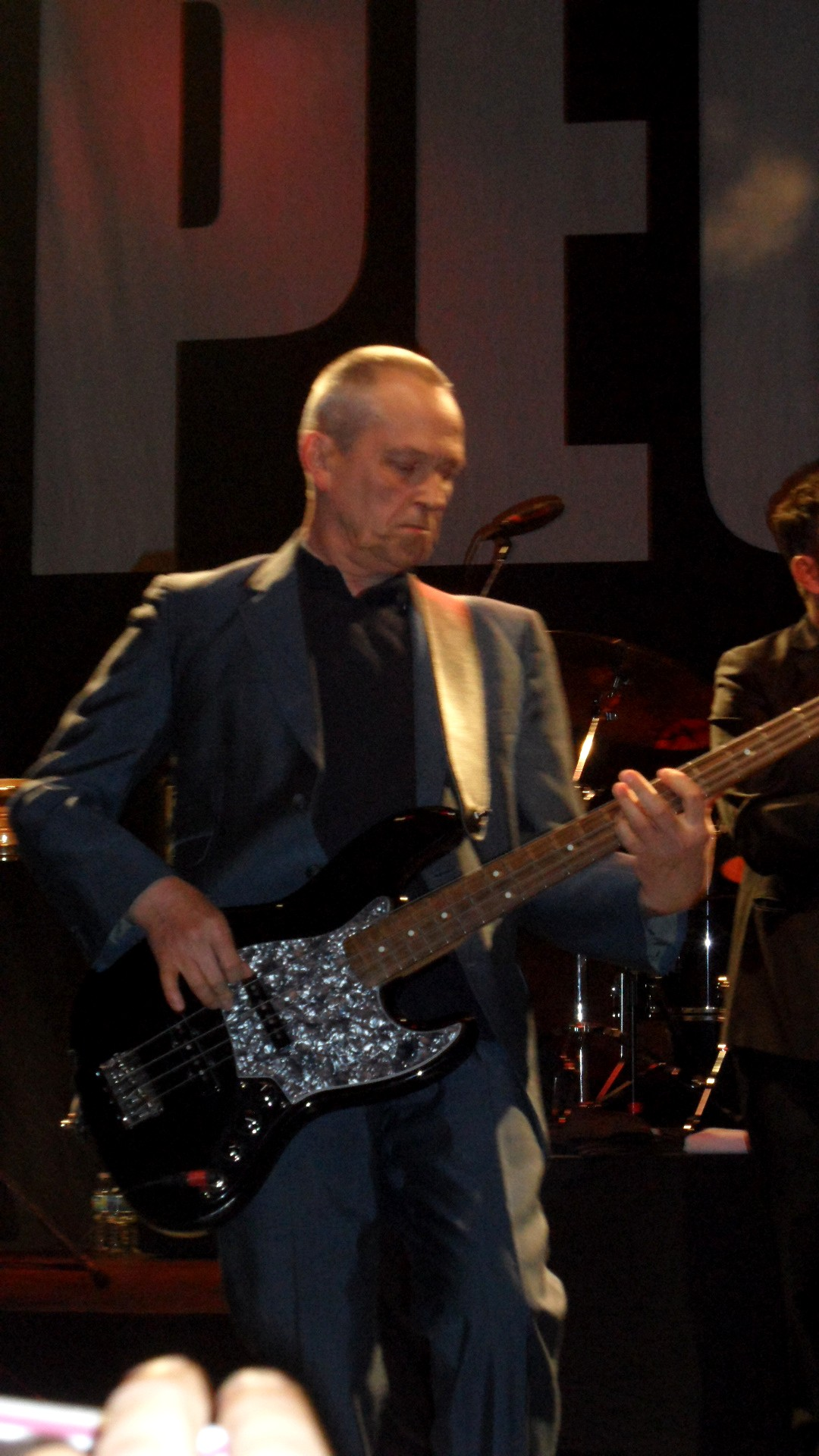
Bassist Horace Panter, who prompted the recording of "Sock It to 'em J.B.".

Side one is eclectic, incorporating energetic ska ("Enjoy Yourself"), northern soul ("Sock It to 'em J.B."), reggae ("Do Nothing") and a "kitsch singalong" ("Pearl's Cafe"). The album is bookended by two cover versions of music hall standard "Enjoy Yourself (It's Later than You Think)." Nick Reynolds writes that the irony behind recording the song is "very black indeed." In the version that opens the album, the song is upbeat, with inventive drumming from Bradbury, but ironically hints at the nation's then-fear of a potentially impending nuclear war. Indicating the band's move away from ska, the song's horn arrangements are said by Goldman to "evoke Bernard Herrmann and the Northern Dance Orchestra more than the cool jerk at Studio One."

"Man at C&A", Hall's first composition, also shares a theme of nuclear war with its lyrics addressing doomsday, and was described by Simon Reynolds as a "film soundtrack/Muzak fusion." The song includes a horn arrangement inspired by Nelson Riddle and "explosion" sounds from Bradbury's synthesised drums. Bradbury's interest in new technology, including synthesised drums, provided a foil to most of the other band members, who preferred simplistic live recording. Lee Thompson of Madness contributes saxophone solos to "Hey, Little Rich Girl", which concerns an aspiring young woman whose career detours into pornography after moving to London.

"Do Nothing" sharply warns about the "dangers of obliviousness", although its searching lyrics are contrasted with the upbeat, laidback rhythm. Peter Chick of The Guardian noted that "[t]he track might conjure a blissful, muzak-smooth, easy-listening utopia, but – as seemed to be More Specials' bleak theme – underneath the surface, everything was fucked up." "Pearl's Cafe" features future Specials vocalist Rhoda Dakar, then of the Bodysnatchers, dueting with Hall, and lyrically comments on the country's frustration, with one critic particularly noting the line: "It's all a load of bollocks, and bollocks to it all." Bradbury's northern soul tribute "Sock It to 'em J.B." was updated via saxophone work from Paul Haskett, who applies a 1960s kitsch sound to proceedings.

=== Side two ===
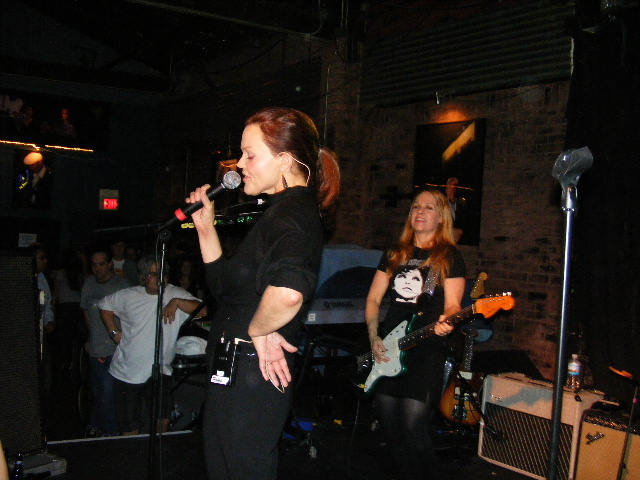
Belinda Carlisle and Charlotte Caffey of the Go-Go's, who appear on the reprise of "Enjoy Yourself".

Side two sees the album enter into more radical territory, dominated by Dammers' infatuation for exotica and film scores. Throughout this side, Dammers plays rhythms in the styles of cha-cha, beguine and bossa nova on his Yamaha home organ. "Stereotypes/Stereotypes Pt. 2" blends lounge, dub and Spaghetti Western music and features complex chord circles that have been compared to Bach. The track begins with exotica sounds, a "chintzy" drum machine beat and ominously harmonised vocals from Hall, Golding and Staple. In the song's second part, it transforms into an extended dub section with Dammers' ringing synth figures, Byers's flamenco notes and drum machine beats rubbing with echo-laden snare drums. Lyrically, it concerns a slacker who drinks heavily and then crashes his car in a police chase. "Holiday Fortnight" is an instrumental flavoured by Mexican and calypso music, whereas "I Can't Stand It" contains cool jazz licks, and was one of the first songs Dammers had ever written.

"International Jet Set" is a bleak psychedelic track in an exotica and "elevator music" style with a sitar-style groove and lucid synths. Lyrically, Hall narrates a personal nervous breakdown on a McDonnell Douglas DC-10 aeroplane in which he talks of the misery of life and his alienation, before the sound of a captain announcing over the PA that the plane is to take a crash landing, presumably killing its passengers. According to Simon Price of Melody Maker, the wider message is explicit: "There’s no one driving. This is the late 20th century and the lunatics have their fingers on the red button. We’re alone. We’re all going to die. Brrrr." The reprise of "Enjoy Yourself" that closes the album is a collaboration with the Go-Go's and is slower and broodier than the first version, transforming the song into "a wry cynicism worthy of 'Threepenny Opera' or similar Brecht/Weill cabaret collaborations," according to Goldman.

== Release and promotion ==
With photography from Carol Starr and Chalkie Davies, the album cover of More Specials depicts a "cheesy" out-of-focus colour photograph of the band snapped in the bar of the former Regent Hotel in Leamington Spa. Dammers asked Davies to take a deliberately bad, out-of-focus picture reminiscent of the album sleeves of Jamaican artists like King Tubby. Simon Reynolds felt this colour sleeve "announced the end of the black-and-white 2-Tone aesthetic," even noting that some of the band are smiling, compared to the serious facial expressions on the first album's sleeve. The identity of the woman on the sleeve was for many years unknown, with many fans wrongly identifying her as Rhoda Dakar. She was later revealed as Pat Bailey; in a 2023 interview, she revealed that she was a neighbour of Neville Staple's and was paid £200 for her appearance. In September 1980, the first single from the album, a double A-side of "Stereotypes" and "International Jet Set", was released to present the band's new "post-ska" sound. It reached number 6 on the UK Singles Chart in September. Released several months later, the second single "Do Nothing" reached number 4 on the chart in December. "Rat Race", included on the American edition of the album, reached number 89 on Billboard's Club Play Singles chart.

More Specials was released on 19 September 1980 in the United Kingdom by 2 Tone Records. Although the band's new direction bewildered some of their fan base, the album was a commercial success, reaching number 5 on the UK Albums Chart and staying on the chart for 20 weeks. It was ultimately certified Gold by the British Phonographic Industry. In the United States, where it was released by Chrysails Records with "Rat Race" added to the track listing, it reached number 98 on the US Billboard 200. The album also made the top 30 in New Zealand and Sweden. It has been re-released several times, including by 2 Tone as an LP in 1987, by Chrysalis as a CD in 1989, again by Chrysalis as a remastered CD in 2002 and more recently as a 2CD deluxe edition by 2 Tone in March 2015, adding a range of bonus material to the album.

Coinciding with the album's release, the Specials began the More Specials Tour in autumn 1980, but the conflicts between band remembers that had surfaced during the album's recording sessions continued to develop throughout the tour, with relations between members being the worst they had ever been. Dammers recalled band members becoming tired and constantly feeling under pressure, and throughout the tour, they watched "the country falling apart" as shops throughout the British towns and cities they played became shuttered up and closed down: "Margaret Thatcher had apparently gone mad, she was closing down all the industries, throwing millions of people on the dole. We could actually see it by touring around. You could see that frustration and anger in the audience. In Glasgow, there were these little old ladies on the streets selling all their household goods, their cups and saucers. It was unbelievable. It was clear that something was very, very wrong."

The scenes they saw inspired the lyrics of their subsequent unemployment-themed non-album single, "Ghost Town" (1981), a critically acclaimed hit which musically mixes reggae with Dammers' continued experimentation with easy listening and programme music, and which reached number one during the 1981 England riots. The popularity of the song was not enough to rebuild relations within the band, and most of the members left later on in 1981, leaving only Dammers and Bradbury, who thereafter added new members and changed the band's name to The Special AKA.

== Critical reception ==
Professional ratings
Review scores
Source	Rating
AllMusic	4.5/5 stars
Christgau's Record Guide	B
Entertainment Weekly	B+
Mojo	4/5 stars
Q	4/5 stars
Record Mirror	5/5 stars
The Rolling Stone Album Guide	4.5/5 stars
Smash Hits	8/10
Sounds	5/5 stars
Uncut	9/10

Critical reception to More Specials was very favourable, with Vivien Goldman of the NME, John Orme of Melody Maker, Mike Gardner of Record Mirror and Garry Bushell of Sounds all praising the album and considering it a bold step for the band. In the words of Panter, they wrote of how it was a "[break] away from a safe-ska stance, redefining dance music for the eighties (dance muzak for the eighties, to be precise)." In the NME, Goldman felt that "[f]ans expecting more frenetic ska re-runs will do a treble-flip when they hear the conglomerate of Zhivago-esque movie soundtracks and other much-maligned musics the Specials have re-validated. Their energy has become more sensual, too, less St Vitus's dance, more mellow hip-grind." She wrote that she would play side two "more than any other 2 Tone artefact" and concluded that "The Specials' maturing process is a proper tonic."

In Smash Hits, David Hepworth felt the decision the change in direction was wise and called the record "[a]n original and highly intelligent album that suggests The Specials can keep it up if you can." Billboard complimented the lyrics as "uniformly excellent whether they're speaking of love or a tribute to James Bond." In his Record Guide, Robert Christgau was somewhat less receptive, saying that although "they make the ska sound their own by synthesizing its trippy beat and their own inborn vocal attenuation into a single formal principle – a platonic ideal of fun," this becomes so conspicuous on side two that "the result is so light it's almost ethereal, political consciousness and all."

Among retrospective reviews, Jo-Ann Greene of AllMusic reflected that the album was "an intensely satisfying set in its day, even if it wasn't as centered as their debut." In Uncut, John Lewis complimented the lyrical "dread that's more existential than adolescent," but felt "the most interesting development is the sonic shift from monochrome into Technicolor." Simon Tucker of Louder Than War agreed that More Specials documents the point "where the band widen their palette even further with the black and white replaced by rainbow," and felt that it was a shame that the album "signposts what could have been if the band had managed to stay together, but maybe they’d said all they could have as a unit by this time." In his review for BBC Music, Nick Reynolds said that the album "has lots of quality, and is almost a classic," while Martin C. Strong of The Great Rock Bible felt the album proved the Specials "were no one trick pony." Less favourable were Trouser Press, who bemoaned the "more turgid experimental approach."

=== Accolades ===
At the end of 1980, it was named the year's 32nd best album by the NME, and 31st best by OOR. In 1995, Melody Maker included it in a list of "great lost albums," having been chosen for inclusion by Simon Price, who wrote an accompanying essay for the album's entry. The album was included in the book 1001 Albums You Must Hear Before You Die. In 1987, Rockdelux named it the 91st best album released between 1980 and 1986. In 2003, Mojo included in their list of the "Top 50 Eccentric Albums," while in 2007 they included in their list of "The 80 Greatest Albums of the 80s." In 2006, Garry Mulholland included it in Fear of Music: The 261 Greatest Albums Since Punk and Disco. It is listed in Amy Britton's book Revolution Rock: The Albums Which Defined Two Decades. Steve Taylor wrote in The A to X of Alternative Music that the Specials "made the music less obviously antagonistic and as a result more powerfully brooding."

== Legacy ==
Ranking Roger of fellow 2 Tone band the Beat poses More Specials as one of the reasons why the Beat became more musically adventurous on their second album Wha'ppen? (1981). He recalled that, unlike the "punkish with an edge" sound of the inaugural Specials album, More Specials "was like Muzak, hotel music! Obviously they’d been on the road too long, that’s what we thought. We thought they’ve been on the road too long cause this is the kind of music we hear in them hotels when we tour round America – everywhere! But it still had a message and that was really successful for them. And maybe it was more successful for them because they challenged to change." He told one interviewer, "[More Specials] was more like muzak and Spanish music and we thought, 'hey up what's going on? It's modern cowboy music or something?' – but people still got into it, they still think of it as a classic."

Music critic Jon Harrington wrote that the "eclectic mixture of styles" on More Specials influenced 1990s trip hop acts including Massive Attack and Portishead, while the revival of interest for easy listening in the mid-1990s could be traced back to Dammers' work on More Specials. Blur were also influenced by More Specials, and some critics have compared several Blur songs to the album; Ian Wade of The Quietus felt the "spectral gloom" of More Specials resides "like a shadow" over Blur's fourth album The Great Escape (1995), most notably on the "kitchen-sink-ska" of "Fade Away", while "Best Days" and "He Thought of Cars" from the same album were said by Scott Plagenhoef of Stylus Magazine to develop upon the "lounge-inspired post-punk" of More Specials. Wade also cites the B-sides "Supa Shoppa" (1994) and especially "The Horrors" (1995) as further examples, the latter song combining "a cheap tango rhythm-preset with schoolhouse piano to push More Specials' postcard bleakness into something approaching existential dread." Orbital sampled "Man at C&A" on the song "Are We Here?" from Snivilisation (1994).

Panter originally felt the album had a strong "beyond cynicism" vibe that seemed "angry at its own impotence. It didn't seem to care." He did not listen to the album for 20 years "because it just reminds me of that time when the band was just falling to bits because it was exhausted." Upon revisiting the album, he found it to be inferior to the band's debut album but noted "it really stands up. Some of the songs are my favourites – 'Man at C&A', I love 'International Jet Set' and 'Enjoy Yourself' has become anthemic these days." The band were considering commemorating the album's 35th anniversary in some fashion in 2015, but these plans did not materialise.

== Track listing ==
Side one
No.	Title	Writer(s)	Length
1.	"Enjoy Yourself"	Herb Magidson, Carl Sigman	3:39
2.	"Rat Race (Note: Only included on North American pressings of the LP)"	Roddy Byers	3:07
3.	"Man at C&A"	Jerry Dammers, Terry Hall	3:36
4.	"Hey, Little Rich Girl" (feat. Lee Jay Thompson)	Byers	3:35
5.	"Do Nothing"	Lynval Golding	3:43
6.	"Pearl's Cafe"	Dammers	3:07
7.	"Sock It to 'em J.B."	Clayton Dunn, Rex Garvin, Pete Holman	2:56
Total length:			23:43

Side two
No.	Title	Writer(s)	Length
8.	"Stereotypes/Stereotypes Pt. 2"	Dammers, Neville Staple	7:24
9.	"Holiday Fortnight"	Byers	2:45
10.	"I Can't Stand It" (feat. Rhoda Dakar)	Dammers	4:01
11.	"International Jet Set"	Dammers	5:37
12.	"Enjoy Yourself (Reprise)"	Magidson, Sigman	1:46
Total length:			21:50

== Personnel ==
The Specials

- Terry Hall – vocals
- Lynval Golding – vocals, guitar
- Neville Staple – vocals, percussion
- Jerry Dammers – organ, piano, keyboards, production
- Roddy Byers – guitar
- Horace Panter – bass guitar
- John Bradbury – drums, production on one track

with:

- Rico Rodriguez – trombone
- Dick Cuthell – cornet, flugelhorn, horn
- Lee Thompson – saxophone
- Paul Heskett – saxophone
- Rhoda Dakar – vocals
- Belinda, Charlotte and Jane – background vocals

Technical

- Dave Jordan – production, engineering
- Jeremy "The Blade" Allom – engineering
- Chalkie Davies, Carol Starr – cover photographs and artwork

== Charts ==
Chart (1980–81)	Peak position
Australian Albums (Kent Music Report)	86
Canada Top Albums/CDs (RPM)	48
Dutch Albums (Album Top 100)	38
New Zealand Albums (RMNZ)	28
Swedish Albums (Sverigetopplistan)	30
UK Albums (Official Charts)	5
US Billboard 200	98

== Certifications ==
Region	Certification	Certified units/sales
United Kingdom (BPI)	Gold	100,000^{^}
^{^} Shipments figures based on certification alone.
