= Best of the Specials =

Best of

Compilation album by The Specials
- Released: 1996
- Genre: Ska
- Length: 55:31
- Label: Disky

The Specials chronology
Too Much Too Young: The Gold Collection (1996)	Best of (1996)	Concrete Jungle (1998)

Professional ratings
Review scores
Source	Rating
Allmusic	2.5/5 stars

Best of the Specials is a budget compilation album by The Specials, released in 1996.

== Track listing ==
No.	Title	Writer(s)	Length
1.	"Rude Boys Outta Jail"	Lynval Golding, Neville Staple	4:06
2.	"A Message to You, Rudy"	R. Thompson	2:52
3.	"Rat Race"	Roddy Byers	3:09
4.	"Maggie's Farm"	Bob Dylan	3:31
5.	"Blank Expression"	Dammers, The Specials	2:42
6.	"Why?"	Golding	3:55
7.	"I Can't Stand It"	Dammers	4:03
8.	"Man at C&A"	Dammers, Terry Hall	3:36
9.	"Do the Dog"	Rufus Thomas, arr. by Dammers	2:09
10.	"Too Much Too Young"	Jerry Dammers, acknowledgment to Lloyd Charmers	6:04
11.	"Monkey Man"	Toots Hibbert	2:45
12.	"Little Bitch"	Dammers	2:32
13.	"War Crimes"	Dammers	4:00
14.	"Nite Klub"	Dammers, The Specials	3:12
15.	"Concrete Jungle"	Byers	3:19
16.	"Enjoy Yourself (It's Later Than You Think)"	Herb Magidson, Carl Sigman	3:36
