= Ghost Town (The Specials song) =

- UK single cover of Ghost Town

Single by the Specials
- B-side: "Why?"; "Friday Night, Saturday Morning"
- Released: 12 June 1981
- Recorded: 3–9 April and 15–17 April 1981
- Studio: Woodbine Street Recording Studios, Royal Leamington Spa; John Collins' home, Tottenham
- Genre: Reggae rock; two-tone
- Length: 3:40; 6:02 (extended version)
- Label: 2 Tone
- Songwriter: Jerry Dammers
- Producer: John Collins

The Specials singles chronology
"Do Nothing" / "Maggie's Farm" (1980)	"Ghost Town" / "Why?" / "Friday Night, Saturday Morning" (1981)	"The Boiler" / "Theme From The Boiler" (1982)

Audio sample
- "Ghost Town": file; help

Music video
- "Ghost Town" on YouTube

"Ghost Town" is a song by the British two-tone band the Specials, released on 12 June 1981. The song spent three weeks at number one and 11 weeks in total in the top 40 of the UK Singles Chart.

Evoking themes of urban decay, deindustrialisation, unemployment and violence in inner cities, the song is remembered for being a hit at the same time as riots were occurring in British cities. Internal tensions within the band were also coming to a head when the single was being recorded, resulting in the song being the last single recorded by the original seven members of the group before splitting up. However, the song was hailed by the contemporary UK music press as a major piece of popular social commentary, and all three of the major UK music magazines of the time awarded "Ghost Town" the accolade of "Single of the Year" for 1981. It was the 12th-best-selling single in the UK in 1981.

== Background ==
The tour for the group's More Specials album in late 1980 had been a fraught experience: already tired from a long touring schedule and with several band members at odds with keyboardist and band leader Jerry Dammers over his decision to incorporate "muzak" keyboard sounds on the album, several of the gigs descended into audience violence. As they travelled, the band witnessed sights that reflected the depressed mood of a country gripped by recession. In 2002, Dammers told The Guardian: "You travelled from town to town and what was happening was terrible. In Liverpool, all the shops were shuttered up, everything was closing down ... We could actually see it by touring around. You could see that frustration and anger in the audience. In Glasgow, there were these little old ladies on the streets selling all their household goods, their cups and saucers. It was unbelievable. It was clear that something was very, very wrong."

In an interview in 2011, Dammers explained how witnessing this event inspired his composition:

The overall sense I wanted to convey was impending doom. There were weird, diminished chords: certain members of the band resented the song and wanted the simple chords they were used to playing on the first album. It's hard to explain how powerful it sounded. We had almost been written off and then "Ghost Town" came out of the blue.

The song's sparse lyric alludes to urban decay, unemployment and violence in inner cities. Jo-Ann Greene of Allmusic notes the lyric "only brush[es] on the causes for this apocalyptic vision — the closed down clubs, the numerous fights on the dancefloor, the spiraling unemployment, the anger building to explosive levels. But so embedded were these in the British psyche, that Dammers needed only a minimum of words to paint his picture." The club referred to in the song was the Locarno (run by the Mecca Leisure Group and later renamed Tiffanys), a regular haunt of Neville Staple and Lynval Golding, and which is also named as the club in "Friday Night, Saturday Morning", one of the songs on the B-side. The building that housed the club is now Coventry Central Library.

== Recording ==
In March 1981, Jerry Dammers heard the reggae song "At the Club" by actor and singer Victor Romero Evans played on Roundtable, the singles review show on BBC Radio 1. Fascinated by the record's sound, Dammers telephoned the song's co-writer and producer John Collins a few days later, although as Dammers' first phone call was in the middle of the night, Collins initially took it to be a joke. Following conversations with Dammers, Collins travelled from his home in London to meet the Specials at their rehearsal studio and agreed to produce their new single.

After becoming overwhelmed with the multitude of choices available in the 24-track studio used during the recording of More Specials, Dammers had decided that he wanted to return a more basic set-up, and after a recommendation from bass player Horace Panter who was familiar with the place, the band chose the small 8-track studio in the house owned by John Rivers in Woodbine Street in Royal Leamington Spa. The studio, which consisted of a recording space in the cellar and a control room in the living room, was too small to accommodate all the members of the band, so rather than their normal recording method of playing all together, Collins recorded each band member playing one at a time and built up the songs track by track.

The three songs for the single were recorded over ten days in April 1981 in two separate sessions at Woodbine Street: seven days from 3 to 9 April and then a further three days from 15 to 17 April. Tensions were high during the recording of the single, with little communication between the band members, and at one point, a frustrated Roddy Byers kicked a hole in the studio door, angering Rivers. Panter said "Everybody was stood in different parts of this huge room with their equipment, no one talking. Jerry stormed out a couple of times virtually in tears and I went after him, 'Calm down, calm down'. It was hell to be around." Dammers said "People weren't cooperating. 'Ghost Town' wasn't a free-for-all jam session. Every little bit was worked out and composed, all the different parts, I'd been working on it for at least a year, trying out every conceivable chord ... I can remember walking out of a rehearsal in total despair because Neville would not try the ideas. You know the brass bit is kind of jazzy, it has a dischord? I remember Lynval rushing into the control room while they were doing it going, 'No, no, no, it sounds wrong! Wrong! Wrong!'"

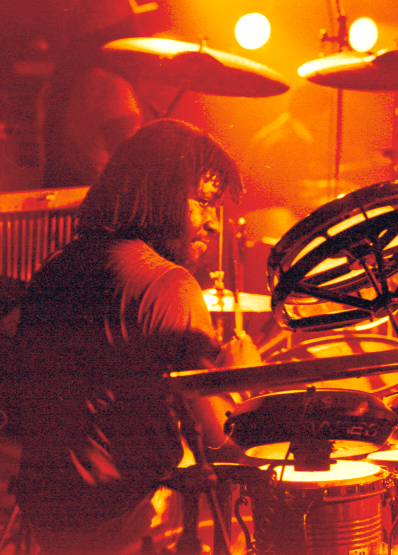
Producer John Collins wanted the song to sound like a Sly and Robbie roots reggae track

Collins wanted the song to sound more like a Sly and Robbie roots reggae track, so he brought a copy of a Sly and Robbie-produced single "What a Feeling" by Gregory Isaacs, to the studio so that drummer John Bradbury could mimic the drum sound. He also suggested the two-handed shuffle rhythm played by Dammers on the Hammond organ throughout the song. Using just eight tracks limited Collins' recording possibilities, but as a reggae producer he decided to use the common reggae method of recording everything in mono: "As we were recording eight-track, I did go with a track plan. I wanted the drums in mono on one track, the bass in mono on another and the rhythm – that shuffle organ and Lynval's DI'd guitar – on another. They're the backbone of a reggae song. Then there was brass on another track, lead vocals on another, backing vocals on another, and various little bits and pieces dropped in ...'Ghost Town' is basically a mono record with stereo reverb and echo that I added in the mix ... The same applied to the brass: John [Rivers] put one mic in the middle of the room, placed Dick [Cuthell] and Rico [Rodriguez] in diagonal corners, and when we listened in the control room it sounded great. Recording simply in mono really helped the instruments balance themselves." However, there was a tense moment towards the end of recording when Dammers decided at the last minute that he wanted to add a flute to the song, and with no free tracks available Collins was forced to record the flute directly onto the track containing the previously recorded brass section, with the possibility that any error would have rendered the entire track unusable:

The guy who played the flute was a member of the band King and we recorded him in the hallway with a microphone at the top of the stairs to get the natural reverb from the stairwell. However, overdubbing the flute nearly killed me because it was not on a free track. Dick Cuthell and Rico Rodriguez had already gone back to London, and I had to record that flute by actually dropping in. Originally, the lead part was done on Jerry's guide organ before the flute was dropped in on the brass track. Well, I had to put a piece of tissue under my chin because sweat was dripping off my face due to it being so scary – one mistake and that would have been it!

As it had not been decided where exactly the backing vocals would be used, Terry Hall, Staple, Golding and Dammers sang a full backing vocal track throughout the song, which Collins used to his advantage as the lyric "this town is coming like a ghost town" had become like a "hypnotic chant" by the end of the song.

Collins took a recording of the separate tracks back to his home in Tottenham in north London where he spent three weeks mixing the song. During this period Hall, Staple, Golding and Dammers all turned up at the house at various times to add further vocals. Since the song had no proper beginning or ending during recording at Woodbine Street, Collins recreated the idea of fading in over a sound effect, which he had used previously on "Lift Off", the B-side of "At the Club". To achieve the effect he wanted, Collins utilised a kit-built Transcendent 2000 synthesiser to create a "ghost" sound, which he used to fade in and out at the beginning and end of the track.

=== B-sides ===
The single had two B-sides, each written by a different member of the Specials. "Why?" is a plea for racial tolerance and was written by guitarist Lynval Golding in response to a violent racist attack he had suffered in July 1980 outside the Moonlight Club in West Hampstead in London, which had left him hospitalised with broken ribs. "Friday Night, Saturday Morning" was written by lead singer Terry Hall and describes a mundane night out in Coventry.

== Music video ==
The music video, directed by Barney Bubbles, consists of bass player Panter driving the band around London in a 1961 Vauxhall Cresta, intercut with views of streets and buildings filmed from the moving vehicle, and ends with a shot of the band standing on the banks of the River Thames at low tide. The video's locations include driving through the Rotherhithe Tunnel and around semi-derelict areas of the East End as well as in Lothbury and Throgmorton Street in the financial district of the City of London in the early hours of daylight on Sunday morning, where the streets were deserted as it was the weekend. The shots of the band in the car were achieved by attaching a camera to the bonnet using a rubber sucker: Panter recalled that at one point the camera fell off (briefly seen in the finished video at 1:18) and scratched the car's paintwork, to the displeasure of the car's owner. The original Ghost Town car can be seen (and sat in) at the Coventry Music Museum.

== Impact ==
Contemporaneous reviews identified the song's impact as an "instant musical editorial" on recent events (the 1981 England riots). Although initial reviews of the single in the UK music press were lukewarm, by the end of the year the song had won over the critics to be named "Single of the Year" in Melody Maker, NME and Sounds, the UK's top three weekly music magazines at the time. AllMusic's retrospective review of the original single argued that the song was the band's "crowning achievement".

The summer of 1981 saw riots in over 35 locations around the UK. In response to the linking of the song to these events, singer Terry Hall said, "When we recorded 'Ghost Town', we were talking about [1980]'s riots in Bristol and Brixton. The fact that it became popular when it did was just a weird coincidence." The song created resentment in Coventry where residents angrily rejected the characterisation of the city as a town in decline.

In the 1990s the song was featured in an episode of the sitcom Father Ted.

The song plays in the opening scene of Edgar Wright's 2004 zombie comedy film Shaun of the Dead.

The song experienced a thematic resurgence on music streaming platforms in 2020, after lockdown orders were placed following the COVID-19 pandemic.

In December 2021, a commemorative plaque was affixed to the house where the former Woodbine Street recording studio was located. The plaque mentions "Ghost Town" was recorded there.

In 2022, it was included in the list "The story of NME in 70 (mostly) seminal songs" at number 19, for "Lacing ska and reggae with the amphetamine edge of new wave". Mark Beaumont praised the song and its "brooding evocation of Thatcher’s wasteland Britain".

British pop group Duran Duran released a cover version of the song on their 2023 Halloween-themed album Danse Macabre.

In 2025, Irish experimental folk band Lankum created a version of the song for Oona Doherty's dance show Specky Clark, later releasing it as a single. On creating the cover, the band said "It’s an honour to be releasing a version of this iconic tune, and it feels eerily relevant to be referencing yet again themes of urban decay, economic hardship and working class frustration".

== Track listing ==
=== 1981 release ===
7" vinyl – 2 Tone CHS TT17
No.	Title	Writer(s)	Length
1.	"Ghost Town"	Dammers	3:40
2.	"Why?"	Golding	2:59
3.	"Friday Night, Saturday Morning"	Hall	3:32

12" vinyl – 2 Tone CHS TT1217
No.	Title	Writer(s)	Length
1.	"Ghost Town (Extended Version)"	Dammers	6:02
2.	"Why? (Extended Version)"	Golding	3:55
3.	"Friday Night, Saturday Morning"	Hall	3:32

=== 1991 release (Ghost Town Revisited) ===
7" vinyl – Tone CHS TT30
No.	Title	Writer(s)	Length
1.	"Ghost Town"	Dammers	3:40
2.	"Ghost Dub '91" (credited to 'Special Productions')	Dammers	4:19

12" vinyl – Tone CHS TT12 30
No.	Title	Writer(s)	Length
1.	"Ghost Town"	Dammers	6:02
2.	"Why?"	Golding	3:55
3.	"Ghost Dub '91" (credited to 'Special Productions')	Dammers	6:34
4.	"Ghost Dub '91 (Version)" (credited to 'Special Productions')	Dammers	4:25

== Personnel ==
The Specials

- John Bradbury – drums
- Roddy Radiation – guitar
- Jerry Dammers – keyboards, Hammond organ, backing vocals
- Lynval Golding – guitar, backing vocals, lead vocals on "Why?"
- Terry Hall – lead vocals, backing vocals
- Horace Panter – bass
- Neville Staple – vocals

Additional personnel

- Dick Cuthell – flugelhorn
- Paul Heskett – flute
- Rico Rodriguez – trombone

== Chart positions ==
Chart (1981)	Peak position
Australia (Kent Music Report)	68
Belgium (Ultratop 50 Flanders)	15
Ireland (IRMA)	3
Netherlands (Single Top 100)	12
New Zealand (Recorded Music NZ)	20
Norway (VG-lista)	7
UK Singles (Official Charts)	1

== Certifications ==
Region	Certification	Certified units/sales
United Kingdom (BPI)	Platinum	600,000^{‡}
^{‡} Sales+streaming figures based on certification alone.
