= The Specials (album) =

Studio album by the Specials
- Released: 19 October 1979
- Recorded: Summer 1979
- Studios: TW Studios, Fulham, London
- Genres: Ska; reggae; 2 tone; punk rock; new wave
- Length: 45:11
- Label: 2 Tone
- Producer: Elvis Costello

The Specials chronology
The Specials (1979)	More Specials (1980)

Singles from The Specials
- 1. "A Message to You Rudy" / "Nite Klub" Released: 12 October 1979

The Specials is the debut studio album by the English ska revival band the Specials. Released on 19 October 1979 on Jerry Dammers' 2 Tone label, the album is seen by some as the defining moment in the UK ska scene. Produced by Elvis Costello, the album captures the disaffection and anger felt by the youth of the UK's "concrete jungle"—a phrase borrowed from Bob Marley's 1973 album Catch a Fire—used to describe the grim, violent inner cities of 1970s Britain. The album features a mixture of original material and several covers of classic Jamaican ska tracks.

A live version of "Too Much Too Young" was later released on a five-track EP of the same name, subtitled The Special A.K.A. Live!, which went to number one on the UK charts. "A Message to You Rudy" was also released as a single. A digitally remastered edition of the album also featuring promotional videos to "Gangsters" and "Too Much Too Young" as enhanced content was released by EMI in 2002.

== Composition ==
Musically, The Specials encapsulates the first wave of British ska, greatly reworking the original sound of 1960s Jamaican ska. The music shares the infectious energy and humour of the original sound, but injects new-found anger and punk sensibility. The resulting sound is considerably less laid-back and "Caribbean" sounding than original ska, and dispensed with much of the percussion and the larger horn sections used in the older variety. The Specials also brought guitar to the front of the mix; it had often been a secondary instrument in Jamaican ska.

Several of the album's songs are covers of older Jamaican songs. "Monkey Man" had been a hit for Toots and the Maytals in 1969, "Too Hot" was a Prince Buster original from 1966, and the opening track, "A Message to You Rudy", was a Dandy Livingstone single in 1967. "You're Wondering Now" was originally performed by the duo Andy & Joey and later covered by the Skatalites; the vocal version was recorded by Andy & Joey in 1964. Other tracks are reworkings of Jamaican originals: "Too Much Too Young" was based on Lloyd Charmers' "Birth Control" and "Stupid Marriage" draws heavily on the Prince Buster hit "Judge 400 Years" (also known as "Judge Dread").

Trombonist Rico Rodriguez, who performed on many 1950s and 1960s Jamaican recordings before moving to London in 1962, played on the band's version of "A Message to You Rudy", as he had on the original recording 15 years previously. Rodriguez's appearance on the album considerably added to the album's credentials.

== Critical reception ==
Professional ratings
Review scores
Source	Rating
AllMusic	5/5 stars
Christgau's Record Guide	A−
Pitchfork	9.3/10
Q	5/5 stars
Record Mirror	5/5 stars
Rolling Stone	4.5/5 stars
The Rolling Stone Album Guide	5/5 stars
Smash Hits	9/10
Sounds	3/5 stars
Uncut	10/10

Reviews of the album in the UK music press were mixed. NME critic Tony Stewart praised the album, writing, "Although the predominant musical influence is black (ska, bluebeat, reggae and soul), it's wrapped in ferocious rock'n'roll: the kind of hybrid that so many other British bands have tried to contrive but, in comparison, failed to make convincing ... This album embraces two decades of black and white music, gives it perspective and then goes on to reflect the modern rock'n'roll culture ... It's the kind of album that's musically fathomless and it will probably establish the Specials as true hopes for the '80s. At the very least, this debut is essential for anybody who wants to know what's going on in rock'n'roll today". Record Mirror's Simon Ludgate described the Specials as "Madness' older, more responsible brother" with "a social conscience" and "greater vocal flexibility", further lauding the album's production for its faithfulness to the Specials' live sound. Smash Hits was also positive, saying it had "some excellent original touches" and that the lyrics were "very strong". Reviewer Red Starr went on to praise Costello's "first rate production" and concluded that the album was "a very promising debut and highly recommended".

On the other hand, Vivien Goldman in Melody Maker was disappointed, observing that "this album's drawbacks are exposed all the more vividly in the light of its missed potential ... producer Elvis Costello seems incapable of producing a rhythm—by that I mean pop, as well as reggae". The review expanded upon this comment, saying, "A key word is pace. The Specials—a great band to party to—can't sustain the shock of having the speed of certain numbers halved. When the pace on record doubles—as in 'Too Much Too Young'—The Specials suddenly make sense". Goldman also criticised the lack of understanding of a female point of view in certain songs, but concluded on a positive note: "Perhaps I'm extra critical, because I (still) have great hopes for the future of The Specials". Dave McCullough of Sounds agreed that the album had not fulfilled its potential, stating, "There are no rough edges to upset you, nothing new to shock you ... The Specials seem to have lost the attacking, forward-looking, forward moving, almost militant momentum that was witnessed and promised from the beginning".

The Specials was ranked among the top ten albums of the year for 1979 by NME.

=== Legacy ===
In a retrospective review for AllMusic, Jo-Ann Greene described the record as "a perfect moment in time captured on vinyl forever ... It was an utter revelation—except for anyone who had seen the band on-stage, for the album was at its core a studio recording of their live set, and at times even masquerades as a gig". She felt the album captured the feeling of "Britain in late 1979, an unhappy island about to explode", and that "The Specials managed to distill all the anger, disenchantment, and bitterness of the day straight into their music". In 2008, BBC Music writer Chris Jones agreed that the economic and political conditions of the day had heightened the record's impact, saying, "To understand the impact of this spearhead of the ska revival on early Thatcherite Britain you have to imagine something so left field and yet so apt occurring today. It was as if depression-era dustbowl ballads suddenly became hip again in this era of global economic meltdown. Hardly anyone would have predicted that a musical form so tied to its Afro-Caribbean heritage (as well as its less cool skinhead connections) could, almost overnight, become the trendiest thing across the nation". He concluded that The Specials "was a classic example of a band making an almost perfect first album, acting as both a mission statement (the rise of right wing groups opposed by the message of Two Tone equality) and as an alternative way to have fun without having to pogo or spit ...The Specials remains a snapshot of a bleaker time, and a wrily comical antidote to political and cultural indifference anywhere". However, Mojo's David Hutcheon, reviewing the reissue, felt that "Specials doesn't feel quite as exciting as it did 23 years ago".

In June 2000, Q placed The Specials at number 38 on its list of the 100 greatest British albums ever. Pitchfork featured The Specials at number 42 on its list of the 100 best albums of the 1970s. Rolling Stone included the album at number 68 on its list of the 100 best albums of the 1980s, as the album was not released in the US until 1980. In 2013, NME ranked The Specials at number 260 on its list of "The 500 Greatest Albums of All Time". The album was included in the book 1001 Albums You Must Hear Before You Die.

== Track listing ==
Side one

1. "A Message to You Rudy" (Dandy Livingstone) – 2:53
2. "Do the Dog" (Rufus Thomas; arrangement by Jerry Dammers) – 2:09
3. "It's Up to You" (Dammers, The Specials) – 3:25
4. "Nite Klub" (Dammers, The Specials) – 3:22
5. "Doesn't Make It Alright" (Dammers, Dave Goldberg, Mark Harrison) – 3:26
6. "Concrete Jungle" (Roddy Byers) – 3:18
7. "Too Hot" (Cecil Campbell) – 3:09

Side two

1. "Monkey Man" (Toots Hibbert) – 2:45
2. "(Dawning of A) New Era" (Dammers) – 2:24
3. "Blank Expression" (Dammers, The Specials) – 2:43
4. "Stupid Marriage" (Dammers, Harrison, Neville Staple, Campbell) – 3:49
5. "Too Much Too Young" (Dammers; acknowledgment to Lloyd Charmers) – 6:06*
6. "Little Bitch" (Dammers)† – 2:31
7. "You're Wondering Now" (Clement Seymour) – 2:36

* Canadian and some US pressings of the album have a shorter, 2:16 version of this song.

† On some US releases, the song "Gangsters" (Dammers, Campbell) appears between "Too Much Too Young" and "Little Bitch". In Australia and New Zealand, "Gangsters" was included between "Do the Dog" and "It's Up to You".

== Personnel ==
The Specials

- Terry Hall – vocals
- Neville Staple – vocals
- Lynval Golding – rhythm guitar, harmonica, vocals
- Roddy Radiation (Roderick Byers) – lead guitar, vocals (on "Concrete Jungle")
- Horace Panter – bass guitar
- John Bradbury – drums
- Jerry Dammers – keyboards

Guest musicians

- Rico Rodriguez – trombone
- Dick Cuthell – horns
- Chrissie Hynde – vocals on "Nite Klub"

Technical

- Dave Jordan – engineer
- Carol Starr, Chalkie Davies – sleeve design

== Charts ==
=== Weekly charts ===
Chart (1979–1980)	Peak position
Australian Albums (Kent Music Report)	20
Canada Top Albums/CDs (RPM)	21
New Zealand Albums (RMNZ)	5
Swedish Albums (Sverigetopplistan)	34
UK Albums (Official Charts)	4
US Billboard 200	84

=== Year-end charts ===
Chart (1980)	Position
New Zealand Albums (RMNZ)	43

== Certifications ==
Region	Certification	Certified units/sales
United Kingdom (BPI)	Gold	100,000^{^}
^{^} Shipments figures based on certification alone.
