= Do Nothing (song) =

1980 single by The Specials

Single by the Specials featuring Rico with the Ice Rink String Sounds

from the album More Specials
- A-side: "Maggie's Farm"
- Released: 5 December 1980
- Genre: Ska; 2 Tone; reggae
- Length: 3:41
- Label: 2 Tone; Chrysalis
- Songwriters: Lynval Golding; Jerry Dammers
- Producer: Dave Jordan

The Specials singles chronology
"Stereotype" / "International Jet Set" (1980)	"Do Nothing" / "Maggie's Farm" (1980)	"Ghost Town" / "Why?" / "Friday Night, Saturday Morning" (1981)

"Do Nothing" is a song by ska/2-tone band The Specials, released in December 1980 by 2 Tone Records as the second single from More Specials. The single peaked at number 4 on the UK Singles Chart.

== Release ==
For the single release of "Do Nothing", the album version of the song was remixed, with Jerry Dammers adding a string synthesiser, credited as the 'Ice Rink String Sounds'. It was released as a double A-side single with a cover version of Bob Dylan's "Maggie's Farm", with reference to then-Prime Minister Margaret Thatcher.

It was the first Specials single in the UK to diverge from the 2 Tone look and have a picture sleeve, with the cover being the band "gathered in a gaudy fun pub clad in polyester leisurewear, an image carrying the pungent subtext that modern life was rubbish". The band's appearance on Top of the Pops with this song also saw a depart from the suits and mod/rude-boy look, with the band wearing Christmas jumpers. Also on Top of the Pops were The Beat, promoting "Too Nice to Talk To" and Horace Panter and David Steele decided to swap roles and mime each other's band's songs.

== Reception ==
Reviewing the song for Record Mirror, Mike Gardner wrote: "A new, improved version of Lynval Golding's song of social frustration is given a lusher treatment with washes of Jerry Dammers' 'Ice Rink String Sounds' and a heavier rhythm base which does nothing to diminish a quality piece of work." Reviewing for Smash Hits, Ronnie Gurr wrote: "Great Reginald Dixon organ sound from Jerry Dammers and more exemplary trombone etchings from Rico. A truly excellent single. Flip over and find a horrendous cocktail lounge calypso cover of Dylan's "Maggie's Farm". Excusable only if it's a political statement."

== Charts ==
Chart (1981)	Peak position
Ireland (IRMA)	13
UK Singles (Official Charts)	4
