= Pama International =

- Origin: England
- Genres: Reggae, ska, dub, rocksteady
- Years active: 2001-present
- Labels: Trojan,
- Members: Finny; Lynval Golding; Fuzz Townshend; Sean Flowerdew; Dredy; Andi McLean; Lenny Bignall; Marcos Ferrari
- Past members: Dan Foster; Kirk Service; Simon Wilcox; Marli; Nick Manasseh; Ernie McKone; Gary Alesbrook; Andy Kinsman
- Website: pamainternational.co.uk

Pama International is an eight-piece reggae band from the United Kingdom. They describe themselves as 'Dub Fuelled Ska Rocksteady & Reggae'. They often play with other ska, dub and reggae artists. The band takes elements from many sources to produce their sound whilst broadly staying within the reggae format.

Former Specials/Fun Boy Three member Lynval Golding appeared with the group occasionally, and became a member as of the 2005 album Float Like A Butterfly.

In 2006, the band became the first new band in thirty years to sign to Trojan Records. Their earlier albums were released by Jamdown Records. The resulting release, Trojan Sessions, had a line-up of vintage ska and reggae guests including Rico Rodriguez, Dennis Alcapone, Dawn Penn, Derrick Morgan and the first recording since the 1970s from Dave and Ansel Collins.

In 2008, the band released Love Filled Dub Band on the Rockers Revolt record label, featuring vocals from Michie One on the track "Highrise".

Finny and Flowerdew were previously members of the British ska band, The Loafers. Golding is an original and current member of The Specials.

== Discography ==
=== Studio albums ===
- Pama International (Jamdown) 2002
- Too Many Freaks Not Enough Stages (Jamdown) 2004
- Float Like A Butterfly (Jamdown/Do The Dog-UK, Asian Man Rcds-USA) 2004
- Trojan Sessions (Trojan) 2006
- Love Filled Dub Band (Rockers Revolt) 2008
- Highrise Campaign (Rockers Revolt) 2009
- Pama Outernational (Rockers Revolt) 2009
- Love & Austerity (Happy People) 2017

=== EPs ===
- Dub Store Special (Jamdown) 2005
