= Rat Race (The Specials song) =

1980 single by The Specials

- Cover of the single released in France

Single by the Specials
- A-side: "Rude Buoys Outa Jail"
- Released: 16 May 1980
- Recorded: Horizon Studios, Coventry
- Genre: Ska; 2 tone; ska punk
- Length: 3:07
- Label: 2 Tone Records (UK); Chrysalis (US and Europe)
- Songwriter: Roddy Radiation
- Producer: Dave Jordan

The Specials singles chronology
"Too Much Too Young" (1980)	"Rat Race" / "Rude Buoys Outa Jail" (1980)	"Stereotype" / "International Jet Set" (1980)

"Rat Race" is a song by ska/2-Tone band the Specials, released on 16 May 1980 by 2 Tone Records as a double A-side single with "Rude Buoys Outa Jail". The single wasn't included on the UK release of the More Specials album, but was included on the US version, released by Chrysalis Records. The song peaked at no. 5 on the UK Singles Chart and also charted on the US Dance Chart.

== Meaning and composition ==
"Rat Race" is a critique on how privileged students "would spend three years pissing it up in college, knowing full well that Daddy would get them a good job when they left no matter what", "while ordinary kids have nothing to look forward to". Linton Kwesi Johnson's "Me Wan' Fi Go Rave" was taken as a musical starting point and keyboardist Jerry Dammers added a plucked piano intro inspired by John Barry (possibly from "A Man Alone" from the soundtrack to the film The Ipcress File).

== Reception ==
Reviewing the song for Record Mirror, Daniela Soave wrote "The group with the Midas touch and my most favourite of the 2 Tone movement. Needless to say they've come up with another winner although this one isn't as obvious as their previous offerings. It sports a fine mysterious keyboard refrain at the beginning which keeps popping up through the song, rather like a Dashiel Hammit novel would make you feel. The more I listen to it the more I love It. The best since 'Gangsters'.

== Music video ==
The music video was shot in the main hall of the Lanchester Polytechnic, now Coventry University, where Dammers and Horace Panter had studied. The band dressed up as stereotypical teachers: Lynval Golding in a tracksuit, Neville Staple in a gown and with a mortarboard, Roddy Radiation as an art teacher, Terry Hall wearing a bow tie and glasses, John Bradbury as a science teacher, Panter in a "tweed jacket with leather elbow patches", and Dammers as the "headmistress from hell." The video was banned by the BBC because of Dammers' cross-dressing.

== Rude Buoys Outa Jail ==
The song was written by Golding, Staples and Panter (credited as Sir Horace Gentleman) in about ten minutes during a rehearsal session. Inspiration for the title and chorus comes from the Baker Desmond and the Clarendonians' song "Rude Boy Gone a Jail".

The song has been released with several variations of spelling. It was originally released as "Rude Buoys Outa Jail" on the majority of the single versions, but has also been spelled "Rude Boys Outa Jail" and "Rude Buoys Outta Jail". The first 100,000 copies of the More Specials album in the UK included a bonus single with a different version of this song called "Rude Boys Outa Jail (Version)" credited to 'Neville Staple AKA Judge Roughneck'.

== Charts ==
Chart (1980)	Peak position
Ireland (IRMA)	17
UK Singles (Official Charts)	5
US Billboard Hot Dance Club Songs	89
