= New wave reggae =

New wave reggae may refer to:

- 2 Tone
- New wave
