= Roots to the Bone =

Compilation album by Rico Rodriguez
- Released: 1995 (UK, Int.)
- Recorded: May, 1976, September 1976, 1979
- Genre: Reggae
- Label: Island
- Producer: Karl Pitterson, Rico Rodriguez, Dick Cuthell, Dennis Bovell

Roots to the Bone was issued by Island Records as a reissue of Rico Rodriguez' most important album, Man from Wareika, (minus two tracks: "Rasta" and "Gunga Din") with some 12" sides from the late 1970s. It was released in 1995.

Rico was musically very active during that time playing in Europe as well as in Japan. He just had releases with Jazz Jamaica and continued with his own recordings he had produced in Japan during 1994/1995. At the same time Trojan re-released his 1969 LPs, Blow Your Horn and Brixton Cat, while Island used its Reggae Refreshers series to present Rico on this album, Roots to the Bone.

The liner notes have been written by Steve Barrow as a brief history of Rico's career that lasted for half a century just as long as the development of Jamaican music as one "of the world's great popular musics". He concludes: "as one of its original creators, he has used his trombone to sing the songs of King Alpha as convincingly as any vocalist."

== Track listing ==
All tracks written by Rico Rodriguez; except Track 1 written by Chuck Mangione, Track 4, written by Paul Desmond

1. "Children of Sanchez"
2. "Midnight in Ethiopia"
3. "Free Ganja"
4. "Take Five"
5. "Far East"
6. "No Politician"
7. "Firestick"
8. "This Day"
9. "Ramble"
10. "Lumumba"
11. "Africa"
12. "Man From Wareika"
13. "Over The Mountain"
14. "Dial Africa"

== Credits ==
Produced by Karl Pitterson except track 1 produced by Dennis Bovell, track 2 by Rico, tracks 3,4 and 12 by Dick Cuthell, track 7 co-produced by Dick Cuthell Engineers: Dick Cuthell, Terry Barnham, Godwin Logie, Paul "Groucho" Smykle, Errol "T" Thompson, Karl Pitterson

Cover by Intro

== Releases ==
1995:

- CD: Reggae Refreshers / Mango RRCD 54 / 524 068-2
