= Today's Specials =

Studio album by the Specials
- Released: 15 April 1996
- Genre: Ska; pop; reggae
- Length: 47:41
- Label: Virgin; Kuff
- Producer: Tom Lowry, Neville Staple, Stoker

The Specials chronology
Too Much Too Young: The Gold Collection (1996)	Today's Specials (1996)	Guilty 'til Proved Innocent! (1998)

Singles from Today's Specials
- 1. "Hypocrite" Released: 1995; 2. "Pressure Drop" Released: 1996; 3. "A Little Bit Me, a Little Bit You" Released: 1996

Professional ratings
Review scores
Source	Rating
AllMusic	2/5 stars

Today's Specials is a cover album by the Specials, released in 1996. It is the first studio album by the group since 1984, albeit not involving the full original line-up. Original members Neville Staple, Roddy Byers, Lynval Golding, and Horace Panter are joined by new members Mark Adams and Adam Birch, along with a number of sessions musicians. Lead vocals are mostly handled by Staple and Golding, with Neville's daughter Sheena Staples contributing backing vocals to the album.

The album was released exclusively on CD in the US, UK and Canada, and on CD and cassette tape in the Netherlands. It did not receive favourable reviews from media or fans, with many reviewers decrying in particular the over-use of synthesizers and pre-programmed drums beats. Neville Staple claims that several of the recordings were actually produced demos, and regrets including them on the album.

The tracks "Pressure Drop" and "Hypocrite" were released as singles in the UK.

== Track listing ==
No.	Title	Writer(s)	Length
1.	"Take Five"	Paul Desmond	3:56
2.	"Pressure Drop"	Toots Hibbert	4:18
3.	"Hypocrite"	Leroy Sibbles	3:25
4.	"Goodbye Girl"	Ken Boothe	3:57
5.	"A Little Bit Me, A Little Bit You"	Neil Diamond	4:32
6.	"Time Has Come"	Slim Smith	5:09
7.	"Dirty Old Town"	Ewan MacColl	3:33
8.	"Somebody Got Murdered"	The Clash	3:06
9.	"Shanty Town 007"	Desmond Dekker	3:57
10.	"Simmer Down"	Bob Marley	3:46
11.	"Maga Dog"	Peter Tosh	2:54
12.	"Bad Boys"	Beckford Bailey	5:08

== Personnel ==
- Neville Staple - vocals, producer
- Roddy Byers - vocals, guitar
- Lynval Golding - guitar, vocals, harmonica, mixing
- Horace Panter - bass guitar
- Mark Adams - organ, keyboards, backing vocals, programming, mixing
- Adam Birch - trombone, trumpet, horn, flugelhorn
- Aitch Hyatt - drums, backing vocals
- Kendell Smith - DJ Vocals
- Sheena Staple - backing vocals
- Stoker - producer, mixing
- Tom Lowry - producer, programming, engineer
- Jim Lansberry - programming, mixing, engineer
- Mike Exeter - Engineer (Hypocrite)
