= Stereotype (The Specials song) =

1980 single by The Specials

- Cover of the single released in France

Single by the Specials

from the album More Specials
- A-side: "International Jet Set"
- Released: 12 September 1980
- Genre: Ska; 2 Tone
- Length: 3:50; 7:24 (extended album version)
- Label: 2 Tone; Chrysalis
- Songwriters: Jerry Dammers; Neville Staple
- Producers: Jerry Dammers; Dave Jordan

The Specials singles chronology
"Rat Race" / "Rude Buoys Outa Jail" (1980)	"Stereotype" / "International Jet Set" (1980)	"Do Nothing" / "Maggie's Farm" (1980)

"Stereotype" is a song by ska/2-Tone band the Specials, released in September 1980 by 2 Tone Records as the first single from More Specials. The single peaked at number 6 on the UK Singles Chart.

== Release and reception ==
"Stereotype" was released as a double A-side single with "International Jet Set". Representing a change in style, which has since been described as a "post-ska" sound, "Stereotype" details the so-called stereotypical life of a man, while noting that people who exactly fit such a generic description do not actually exist in real life. This is shown in the opening verse: "He's just a stereotype, he drinks his age in pints, he has girls every night, but he doesn't really exist". The More Specials album features an extended dub version of the song, titled "Stereotypes/Stereotypes Pt. 2", with the second part being written by Neville Staple.

The man described in the song likes to spend his nights drinking in pubs with his friends and stays out as late as possible, frequently driving home while intoxicated and having sex with one or more women. When he contracts a sexually transmitted disease, his doctor prescribes a course of medication and orders him not to drink for 17 weeks. Once cured, he goes on a drinking binge, gets into a fight, and winds up in a car chase with the police that ends with him crashing into a lamppost.

Reviewing for Record Mirror, Daniela Soave wrote that "Stereotype" "reminds me of a Dashiell Hammet [sic] film theme. Far more adventurous than usual. It has more depth and consequently will probably take more getting used to. It'll be interesting to see if it goes as high in the charts as its predecessors".

== Track listing ==
7": 2 Tone / CHS TT 13

1. "Stereotype" – 3:50
2. "International Jet Set" – 4:12

== Charts ==
Chart (1980)	Peak position
Ireland (IRMA)	12
Netherlands (Single Top 100)	41
UK Singles (OCC)	6
