= Moon Hop =

1969 single by Derrick Morgan

Single by Derrick Morgan
- A-side: "Moon Hop"
- B-side: "Harris Wheel" (Reggaeites)
- Released: 1969
- Genre: Reggae
- Label: Crab Records
- Songwriter(s): Derrick Morgan (Moon Hop); Joe Willis (Harris Wheel)

"Moon Hop" is a 1969 single by Derrick Morgan. Backed with the Reggaeites' "Harris Wheel", it reached #49 on the UK Singles Chart. The British Afro-Caribbean ska and reggae band Symarip covered "Moon Hop" as "Skinhead Moonstomp"; whilst unsuccessful on first release, in the wake of the 2 Tone revolution it was re-issued and charted at #54.

== Background ==
"Moon Hop" was written to commemorate the July 20, 1969 landing of the Apollo Lunar Module on the moon. Symarip's version was released shortly afterwards and many see a strong similarity between the two. The Symarip version includes a vocal introduction: "I want all you skinheads to get up on your feet/Put your braces together and your boots on your feet/And give me some of that old moonstomping" which was based on Sam & Dave's "I Thank You.” The screeching guitar and lyrics were intended to appeal to skinheads. When released for the first time, Moonstomp sold 5,000 copies, and Symarip named their album after it.

== Chart performance ==
"Moon Hop" was the first version to chart on the UK Singles Chart; backed with the Reggaeites' "Harris Wheel", it spent a week at #49 in January 1970. Although Symarip's version didn't chart on first release, it was re-released ten years later in 1980 in the wake of the 2 Tone revolution, and spent three weeks on the UK Singles Chart in 1980.
