= Too Much Too Young (EP) =

EP by The Special A.K.A. featuring Rico
- Released: 11 January 1980
- Recorded: The Lyceum, London, and Tiffany's, Coventry, 1979
- Genres: Ska, 2-tone
- Length: 11:04
- Label: 2 Tone
- Producers: Jerry Dammers and Dave Jordan

The Specials singles chronology
"Nite Klub" / "A Message to You, Rudy" (1979)	"Too Much Too Young" (1980)	"Rat Race" / "Rude Buoys Outa Jail" (1980)

Too Much Too Young – The Special A.K.A. Live! is a live EP by the Specials with Rico Rodriguez, released on 11 January 1980. On the original release, the front cover credited the performers as The Special A.K.A. featuring Rico, while the back cover mentions and the labels credited only The Specials.

Renowned for their live shows, the Specials released a five-track live EP in January 1980 as the third single by the band. The EP featured "Too Much Too Young" (originally recorded on the album The Specials) with "Guns of Navarone" recorded live in London; and "Skinhead Symphony" – a medley of "Long Shot Kick De Bucket", "The Liquidator" and "Skinhead Moonstomp" – which was recorded at Tiffany's in Coventry.

Lead track "Too Much Too Young" was based on the 1969 song "Birth Control" by Lloyd Charmers.

Contrary to what is sometimes stated, "Too Much Too Young" was not banned by the BBC due to mentions of contraception in the lyrics. However, when the song's promotional video was featured on Top of the Pops, it was cut off just before the final line, "try wearing a cap".

The song topped the UK Singles Chart for two weeks in February 1980. It became only the second EP to top the chart after Demis Roussos's The Roussos Phenomenon EP in 1976, and was also the first live recording to top the chart since Billy Connolly's "D.I.V.O.R.C.E." in 1975. At 2:04, it was the shortest song to reach No. 1 on the UK Singles Chart in the 1980s.

Rodriguez played trombone on "Guns of Navarone" and "Long Shot Kick De Bucket", and Dick Cuthell played flugelhorn on "Guns of Navarone".

== Track listing ==
Side A

1. "Too Much Too Young" (Jerry Dammers, acknowledgment to Lloyd Chalmers) – 2:04
2. "Guns of Navarone" (Dimitri Tiomkin, Webster) – 2:25

Side B – Skinhead Symphony

1. "Long Shot Kick De Bucket" (George Agard, Sydney Crooks, Jackie Robinson) – 3:10
2. "The Liquidator" (Harry Johnson) – 1:15
3. "Skinhead Moonstomp" (Roy Ellis, Monty Naysmith) – 2:11

== Charts ==
Chart	Peak position
Irish Singles Chart	3
UK Singles Chart	1

== See also ==
- List of UK Singles Chart number ones of the 1980s
