= 2 Tone Records =

English independent record label

- Logo featuring Walt Jabsco and the checkerboard motif associated with Two Tone
- Parent company: Chrysalis Records (Blue Raincoat Music)
- Founded: 1979
- Founder: Jerry Dammers
- Defunct: 1986
- Distributor: Reservoir Media Management
- Genre: Two-tone
- Country of origin: England
- Location: 51, Albany Road, Earlsdon, Coventry, England
- Official website: 2-tone.info

2 Tone Records was an English independent record label that mostly released ska and reggae-influenced music with a punk rock and pop music overtone. It was founded by Jerry Dammers of the Specials and backed by Chrysalis Records.

== History ==
Jerry Dammers of the ska revival band the Specials started the record label in 1979. Chrysalis had wanted to sign the Specials, but Dammers arranged a label deal, for Chrysalis to fund 15 singles a year and release at least ten of those.

The label spawned the 2 Tone music and cultural movement, which was popular among skinheads, rudies and some mod revivalists. The label stopped operating in 1986, though "2 Tone" is still used as an imprint for back catalogue issues. 2 Tone Records signed the Selecter, Madness and The Beat, but they all left within two years. 2 Tone Records acts signed a contract that allowed them to leave the label after releasing just one single, which was unusual in the record industry. Madness and The Beat both took advantage of this clause; the former to sign to Stiff Records, and the latter to start their own label, Go Feet Records.

Although 2 Tone Records was closely identified with the ska revival, efforts were made to broaden the label's musical output, releasing recordings by artists such as singer-songwriter Elvis Costello and the funk-punk band the Higsons.

Dammers, with the assistance of Horace Panter and graphic designers John "Teflon" Sims and David Storey, created artwork that was to become central to 2 Tone Records. The logo portrays a man in a black suit, white shirt, black tie, pork pie hat, white socks and black loafers. Named "Walt Jabsco", the fictional character was based on a photograph of Peter Tosh, a former member of the Wailers. Walt got his name from an old American bowling shirt that Dammers owned. He influenced the design of an emoji (originally meant to depict a suited man doing the pogo): U+1F574 🕴 MAN IN BUSINESS SUIT LEVITATING.

== Artists ==
- The Apollinaires
- Jerry Dammers
- Ranking Roger
- Bad Manners (only for Dance Craze)
- The Beat (known as "The English Beat" in the US)
- The Bodysnatchers
- Elvis Costello & the Attractions (only for one unreleased single)
- The Higsons
- JB's Allstars
- Madness
- Rhoda Dakar
- Rico Rodriguez
- The Selecter
- The Specials (sometimes called "The Special AKA")

== Discography ==
=== Albums ===
- The Specials — The Specials
- The Selecter — Too Much Pressure
- The Specials — More Specials
- Various Artists — Dance Craze
- Rico Rodriguez — That Man Is Forward
- Rico Rodriguez — Jama Rico
- Various Artists — This Are Two Tone (1983)
- The Special AKA — In the Studio
- Various Artists — The 2 Tone Story
- The Specials — Singles
- The Specials — Live at the Moonlight Club
- Various Artists — Best of 2 Tone
- Various Artists — The Compact 2 Tone Story

=== Singles ===
- TT1 / TT2 The Special AKA — "Gangsters" / The Selecter – "The Selecter" 7" (Split single with The Selecter)
- CHS TT3 Madness — "The Prince" / "Madness" 7"
- CHS TT4 The Selecter — "On My Radio" / "Too Much Pressure" 7"
- CHS TT5 The Specials — "A Message to You Rudy" / "Nite Klub" 7" (Ft Rico)
- CHS TT6 The Beat — "Tears of a Clown" / "Ranking Full Stop" 7"
- CHS TT7 The Special AKA — "Too Much Too Young", "Guns of Navarone" / "Longshot Kick the Bucket", "Liquidator", "Skinhead Moonstomp" 7" (All tracks recorded live)
- CHS TT7 Elvis Costello & The Attractions — "I Can't Stand Up for Falling Down" / "Girl's Talk" 7" (Unreleased – given away at gigs)
- CHS TT8 The Selecter — "Three Minute Hero" / "James Bond" 7"
- CHS TT9 The Bodysnatchers — "Let's Do Rock Steady" / "Ruder Than You" 7"
- CHS TT10 The Selecter — "Missing Words" / "Carry Go Bring Come" 7"
- CHS TT11 The Specials — "Rat Race" / "Rude Boys Outa Jail" 7"
- CHS TT12 The Bodysnatchers — "Easy Life" / "Too Experienced" 7"
- CHS TT13 The Specials — "Stereotype" / "International Jet Set" 7"
- CHS TT14 The Swinging Cats — "Mantovani" / "Away" 7"
- CHS TT15 Rico Rodriguez — "Sea Cruise" / "Carolina" 7"
- CHS TT16 The Specials — "Do Nothing" / "Maggie's Farm" 7"
- CHS TT17 The Specials — "Ghost Town" / "Why?" / "Friday Night, Saturday Morning" 7"
- CHS TT12 17 The Specials — "Ghost Town" (Extended) / "Why?" (Extended) / "Friday Night, Saturday Morning" 12"
- CHS TT18 Rhoda & The Special AKA — "The Boiler" / "Theme from the Boiler" 7"
- CHS TT19 Rico Rodriguez & The Special AKA — "Jungle Music" / "Rasta Call You" 7"
- CHS TT12 19 Rico Rodriguez & The Special AKA — "Jungle Music" / "Rasta Call You" / "Easter Island" 12"
- CHS TT20 The Apollinaires — "The Feeling's Gone" / "The Feeling's Back" 7"
- CHS TT12 20 The Apollinaires — "The Feeling's Gone" (Dance Mix) / "The Feeling's Back" / "The Bongo Medley" (Extremely Long Version) 12"
- CHS TT21 The Higsons — "Tear the Whole Thing Down" / "Y Lang, Y Lang" 7"
- CHS TTS1 The Apollinaires — "Envy the Love" / "Give It Up" / "Tear the Whole Thing Down" / "Y Lang, Y Lang" 12" (White label promo only, split with Higsons)
- CHS TT22 The Apollinaires — "Envy the Love" / "Give It Up" 7"
- CHS TT12 22 The Apollinaires — "Envy The Love" / "Give It Up" 12"
- CHS TT23 The Special AKA — "War Crimes" / "War Crimes" (Version) 7"
- CHS TT10 23 The Special AKA — "War Crimes" / "War Crimes" (Version) 10"
- CHS TT24 The Higsons — "Run Me Down" (Long Version) / "Put the Punk Back Into Funk Pts 1 & 2" 7"
- CHS TT12 24 The Higsons — "Run Me Down" / "Put the Punk Back Into Funk Pts 1 & 2" 12"
- CHS TT25 The Special AKA — "Racist Friend" / "Bright Lights" 7"
- CHS TT12 25 The Special AKA — "Racist Friend" / "Bright Lights" / "Racist Friend" (Instrumental) / "Bright Lights" (Instrumental) 12"
- CHS TT25 The Special AKA — "Racist Friend" / "Bright Lights" 7" (Picture Disc)
- CHS TT26 The Special AKA — "Nelson Mandela" / "Break Down the Door!" 7"
- CHS TT12 26 The Special AKA — "Nelson Mandela" / "Break Down the Door!" 12"
- CHS TT27 The Special AKA — "What I Like Most About You Is Your Girlfriend" / "Can't Get a Break" 7"
- CHS TT12 27 The Special AKA — "What I Like Most About You Is Your Girlfriend" (Extended Version) / "Can't Get a Break" 12" (Early copies had free poster)
- CHS TT 272 The Special AKA — "What I Like Most About You Is Your Girlfriend" / "Can't Get a Break" / "War Crimes" / "War Crimes" (Version) 7" (Twin 7" pack with "War Crimes" single)
- CHS TP 27 The Special AKA — "What I Like Most About You Is Your Girlfriend" / "Can't Get a Break" 7" (Picture disc)
- CHS TT28 The Friday Club — "Window Shopping" / "Window Shopping" (Instrumental) 7"
- CHS TT12 28 The Friday Club — "Window Shopping" / "Window Shopping" (Instrumental) 12"
- CHS TT29 JB's Allstars — "The Alphabet Army" / "Al. Arm" 7"
- CHS TT12 29 JB's Allstars — "The Alphabet Army" / "String Mix" / "Radio Version" / "Al. Arm" 12"
- Tone FNMX1 The Special AKA — "Free Nelson Mandela" (70th Birthday Remake) / "Free Nelson Mandela" 12"
- TTP1 V/A — The 2 Tone Story promo EP 7" (4 track EP, Specials, Selector, Madness, promo for The 2 Tone Story LP)
- CHS TT30 The Specials — "Ghost Town" / "Ghost Town" (Dub '91) 7"
- CHS TT12 30 The Specials — "Ghost Town" / "Why ?" / "Ghost Town" (Dub '91) / "Version" 12"
- CHS TT31 Various Artists — The 2 Tone EP 7" (Special AKA, Madness, Selecter, Beat) (released in 1993)
- CHS TT32 The Specials — "Sock It to 'Em J.B. (Dub)" / "Rat Race (Dub)" 7" (released for Record Store Day 2014)

== See also ==
- Man in Business Suit Levitating emoji was based on their logo.
