= Roddy Radiation =

British rock musician (born 1955)

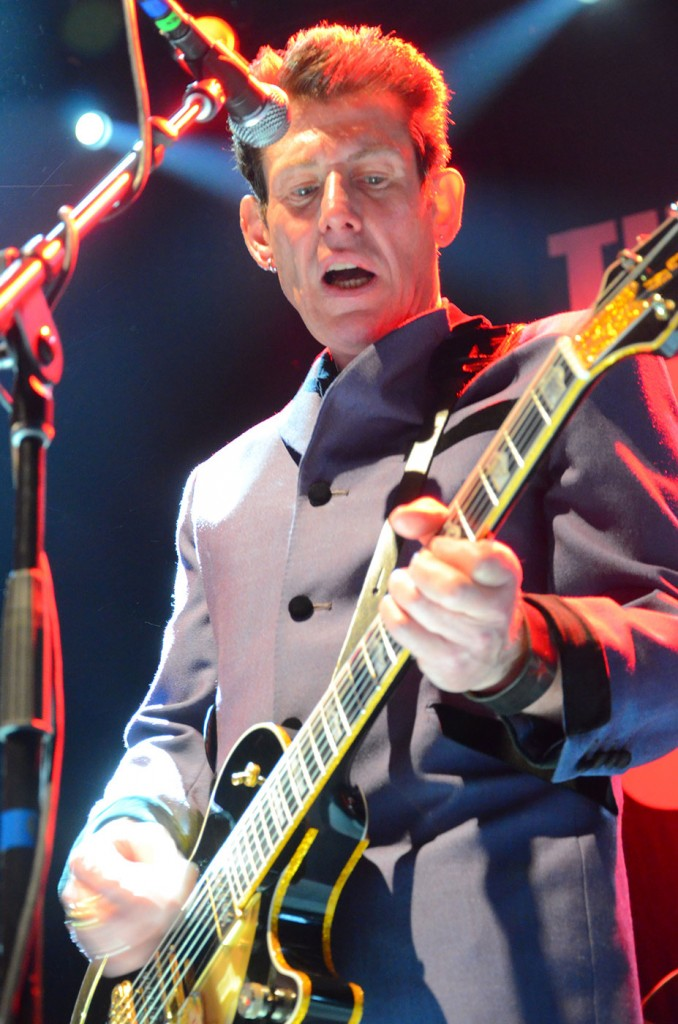
- Byers performing with the Specials in 2013.

Background information
- Also known as: Roddy Radiation, Roddy Byres
- Born: Roderick James Byers; 5 May 1955 (age 71); Keresley, Coventry, Warwickshire, England
- Genres: Rockabilly; ska; punk rock; reggae rock
- Occupation: Musician
- Instruments: Guitar; vocals
- Years active: 1975–present
- Formerly of: The Specials
- Website: www.roddyradiation.com

Roderick James "Roddy" Byers (born 5 May 1955), known professionally as Roddy Radiation, is an English musician who played lead guitar for the Specials, as well as many rockabilly bands such as the Bonediggers and the Tearjerkers. He wrote the Specials favourites "Concrete Jungle", "Rat Race" and "Hey, Little Rich Girl", later covered by Amy Winehouse. Currently, Byers leads the Skabilly Rebels, a band that mixes ska rhythms with rockabilly.

== Biography ==
Byers' first real band was formed in Coventry in 1975 and were called the Wild Boys. It was in the Wild Boys that he started songwriting. His first was "1980's Teddy Boy", and later came "Concrete Jungle" which was recorded by the Specials for their debut album, Specials (1979).

Byers joined the Specials when the band was called the Coventry Automatics, and he wrote several songs for the band. The most successful was "Rat Race", which peaked at number five in the UK Singles Chart in May 1980. Byers also wrote "Hey Little Rich Girl", which appeared on the Specials second album, More Specials (1980). "Hey Little Rich Girl" was released as a single in Japan by Chrysalis Records in 1980, and covered by Amy Winehouse on her album Back to Black. Byers sang the lead vocal on "Concrete Jungle" and "Braggin' and Tryin' Not to Lie", which was released as a free single with initial copies of More Specials. "Braggin' and Tryin' Not to Lie" was credited to Roddy Radiation & the Specials.

After the Specials split in 1981, Byers was dropped by Chrysalis before he re-emerged with the Tearjerkers, a band that he had begun in the last months of the Specials. The band played numerous gigs and gained a cult following. The band originally were Roddy Byers (vocals/guitar), Mark Byers (vocals/guitar), Joe Hughes (vocals/bass), Pete Davies (drums) and Slim Tearjerker a.k.a. Clive Pain (vocals/keyboards/accordion). The later version was comprised Roddy Byers (vocals/guitar) Mark Byers (vocals/guitar) Badger (bass) and Tony Lynch (drums). The Tearjerkers were signed up by Chiswick Records in 1982, and released their debut single "Desire" b/w "Western Song". The band finally split in 1987 because, as Roddy commented, "after seven years there was no major recording success".

The Bonediggers were formed shortly after the Tearjerkers ended in 1987. The band released a self-titled album on Rimshot Records the following year with a rawer, hard-edged rockabilly sound. The Bonediggers consisted of Roddy Radiation (vocals/guitar), David West (vocals/guitar), Sam Smith (bass), and Gary Muldoon (drums), later replaced by Jim Pryall. Byers still plays with Sam Smith to this day in the Skabilly Rebels. The Bonediggers would transition into the Raiders, shortly before Byers reunited with several members of the Specials to form the Specials MK2.

Byers was an essential part of the Specials 2, who formed in the early 1990s after teaming up with Desmond Dekker for the King of Kings album. The group toured for a couple of years throughout the UK, America and Japan. They released two singles "Hypocrite" and a cover of Toots & the Maytals "Pressure Drop". The band recorded two albums 1996 Today's Specials, a compilation of covers and 1998 Guilty 'til Proved Innocent! which were made up of original material. Byers contributed songs for latter's "Tears in My Beer," "Bonediggin'," "Keep on Learning" and "The Man With No Name".

After the Specials 2, Byers worked with the acoustic project, Three Men & Black, which consisted of Jean Jacques Burnel (The Stranglers), Jake Burns (Stiff Little Fingers), Pauline Black (The Selecter), Bruce Foxton (The Jam) and Dave Wakeling (The Beat, General Public) and Nick Welsh (Skaville UK).

Byers' current band, the Skabilly Rebels, are based in Coventry. They are Roddy Byers - lead guitar, vocals; Adrian Lee - saxophone, keyboards; Joe Harcourt - second guitar, backing vocals;, Connor O’Connor - bass guitar and Matt Hart - drums.

They released their debut album Blues Attack at the end of 2009 and toured the United States in 2012 and regularly tour the UK, Ireland and Europe.
