= Lynval Golding =

Jamaican-born British musician (born 1951)

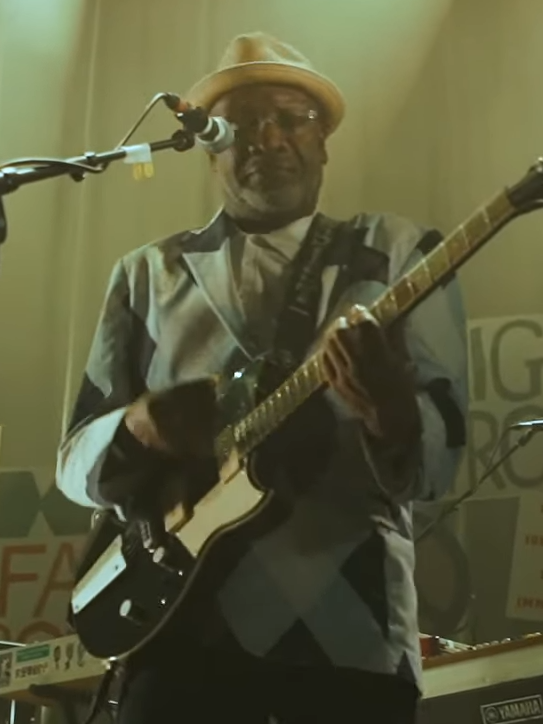
- Golding in 2019

Background information
- Born: 24 July 1951 (age 75); Saint Catherine, Colony of Jamaica
- Origin: Coventry, England
- Genres: New wave, ska, rock
- Occupation: Musician
- Label: Island Records

Lynval Golding (born 24 July 1951) is a Jamaican-born British musician. His family moved from Jamaica to Gloucester, before moving to Coventry when he was eighteen. He is currently living in Gig Harbor, Washington. He is best known as a rhythm guitarist and vocalist with the British 2-tone band, the Specials.

He went on to co-found Fun Boy Three with Terry Hall and Neville Staple., and then joined the Coventry group After Tonite. He was also in the short-lived group Pauline Black With Sunday Best, which also included Neville Staple and members of After Tonite.

In 1990, Golding joined former members of The Specials and The Beat to form Special Beat. He joined a reconstituted Specials lineup from 1993 to 1998.

In 2006, he toured the U.S. with The Beat, a reunion version of another second wave ska band. He started a band in Seattle, Stiff Upper Lips, and also started playing with UK group Pama International.

In 2007, he appeared live at the Glastonbury Festival on the Pyramid Stage with Lily Allen and fellow Specials / Fun Boy Three band member Terry Hall. He also played on the Park Stage, once again with Terry Hall and also Blur frontman Damon Albarn and beatboxer Shlomo, playing a version of The Specials hit "A Message To You, Rudy". These appearances led to a full-fledged Specials reunion, and Lynval remained with them until their dissolution in 2022.

Stiff Upper Lip broke up along the way, but was re-formed as Gigantor in 2013. He continues to tour with both Gigantor and Pama International.

== Personal life ==
In 1982, Golding was stabbed in the neck in a nightclub in Coventry, leaving him in intensive care.

== Discography ==
See also The Specials Discography, Fun Boy Three, Pama International

| Artist | Title | Release date | Label | Details |
|---|---|---|---|---|
| The Special AKA | In the Studio | 1984 | 2 Tone Records | Lynval Appears on "Free Nelson Mandela" |
| Pauline Black With Sunday Best | Pirates On The Airwaves (Single) | 1984 | Chrysalis | Band member, producer |
| Robert Wyatt with The SWAPO Singers | The Wind of Change / Namibia (single) | 1984 | Rough Trade | Lynval plays guitar – also features Jerry Dammers and Dick Cuthell |
| After Tonight | Time For A Change (12" Single) | 1986 | IDK Records | Band member, producer |
| After Tonight | The Polish Man Who Sits In The Corner (album) | 1988 | BGP (Beat Goes Public) | Band member, producer |
| The Pogues | Live At The Town And Country | 1988 | Warner Brothers | Lynval sings and plays guitar on "Rudi: A Message to You" |
| Various Artists | The Shack | 1993 | BiB Records | "Why?" and "Wear You to the Ball" credited to Neville Staple and Lynval Golding (both tracks actually Specials/Fun Boy Three demos) |
| The Soup Dragons | Hydrophonic | 1994 | Polygram | Lynval plays guitar on "Rest in Peace", with Neville Staple toasting |
| Various Artists | Spare Shells: A Tribute to the Specials | 2001 | Pork Pie | Appears with Skanic on "Do Nothing" |
| Militant Rhythm Section | Mexican Weed Dub | 2005 | Utmost | Guest |
| Lynval Golding and Contra Coup | Know Your Rights (12" Vinyl) | 2016 | Mossburg | Know Your Rights! / Know Your Rights – MA Mix / The Same / The Same – MA Mix |
| The Notables Featuring Lynval Golding | Children Children / Good King (7" Vinyl) | | Mossburg | |
| Various Artists | Gifted: Ska Tribute To The Jam | 2018 | Jump Up! Records | Lynval Golding and Contra Coup perform "Tales of the Riverbank" |
