= Dick Cuthell =

British musician and record producer

- Born: Richard Cuthell
- Origin: Liverpool, England
- Genres: Ska; pop
- Occupations: Musician; record producer
- Instruments: Flugelhorn; cornet; trumpet; bass; keyboards; percussion
- Years active: 1960s–present

Dick Cuthell is a British musician and record producer. He plays flugelhorn, cornet, and trumpet, amongst a range of other brass instruments, including tenor horn and valve trombone. Cuthell is best known for his work with the Specials and Rico Rodriguez. He also collaborated with bands such as Madness, Eurythmics, Fun Boy Three, XTC, Level 42, the Pogues and The Red Crayola. In addition to a range of horns, Cuthell also plays bass, keyboards and percussion and is a composer and arranger.

== Biography ==
Dick Cuthell was born in Liverpool in 1949.

=== Island records ===
After playing in several bands including the Washington Soul Band and Trifle in the 1960s, Cuthell worked for Island Records in the 1970s as an engineer and later in-house producer. His work at Island Studios in both Jamaica and London brought him into contact with reggae and ska musicians, and these became a constant theme in the music he played and produced, working with Delroy Washington amongst many others. He acted as assistant engineer on Bob Marley's Exodus album, on which he also played horns, and also met Rico Rodriguez, with whom he would later work in The Specials. He was also one of several engineers that worked on the dub album of Burning Spear's Marcus Garvey album, Garvey's Ghost.

=== The Specials ===
Cuthell became, along with Rico Rodriguez, the horn section for the Specials, playing cornet on their debut album, and staying with the band into their later incarnation as the Special A.K.A., playing on the hit single "Free Nelson Mandela", and the album In the Studio. He co-wrote two of the band's songs, "Bright Lights" and "Racist Friend", released together as a single in 1983, reaching No. 60 in the UK.

Cuthell also recorded with another group of ex-members of the Specials, Fun Boy Three.

=== Later production and session work ===
Throughout the 1980s, Cuthell continued both production and session work. He contributed trumpet, flugelhorn and cornet to the Eurythmics' 1983 No. 1 album Touch, and also toured as part of the band. He played horns on the Pogues' 1985 album Rum, Sodomy, and the Lash.

His productions include the Boothill Foot Tappers 1985 album Ain't That Far from Boothill.

He also recorded with Madness, and Linton Kwesi Johnson.
