= Rico Rodriguez (musician) =

Jamaican musician (1934–2015)

Rico Rodriguez MBE
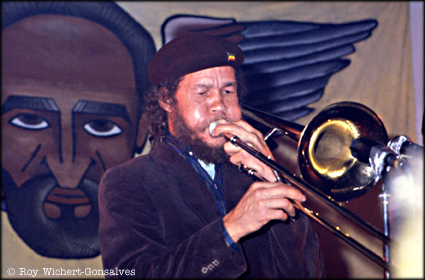
- Rodriguez performing in 1977

Background information
- Also known as: Reco, El Reco
- Born: Emmanuel Rodriguez; 17 October 1934; Havana, Cuba
- Origin: Kingston, Jamaica
- Died: 4 September 2015 (aged 80) London, England
- Genres: Ska; reggae
- Occupation: Musician
- Instrument: Trombone
- Years active: 1958–2015

Emmanuel "Rico" Rodriguez MBE (17 October 1934 – 4 September 2015), also known as Rico, Reco or El Reco, was a Cuban-born Jamaican ska and reggae trombonist. He recorded with producers such as Karl Pitterson, Prince Buster, and Lloyd Daley. He was known as one of the first ska musicians. Beginning in the 1960s, he worked with the Members, the Specials, Jools Holland, and Paul Young.

== Career ==
Rodriguez was born in Havana, Cuba, and at an early age moved with his family to Jamaica. He grew up there in Kingston, and was taught to play the trombone by his slightly older schoolmate Don Drummond at the Alpha Boys School. In the 1950s, Rodriguez became a Rastafarian and was closely associated musically to the rasta drummer Count Ossie.

In 1961, Rodriguez moved to the UK, where he joined live bands such as Georgie Fame's Blue Flames and started to play in reggae bands. Rodriguez also began recording with his own band, Rico's All Stars, and later formed the group Rico and the Rudies, recording the 1969 albums Blow Your Horn and Brixton Cat. In 1976, he recorded the album Man from Wareika under a contract with Island Records. In the late 1970s, he recorded a song called "Offshore Banking Business" with the Members and with the arrival of the 2 tone genre, he played with ska revival bands such as the Specials including their single "A Message to You, Rudy".

Rodriguez is mentioned in the Ian Dury and the Blockheads song "Reasons to Be Cheerful, Part 3". The song was released just months before Rico joined the Specials.

In 1982, he returned to Jamaica to retire from performing professionally; however, in 1987 he came back to the UK to tour with the Heart Beat Band, and between 1992 and 1995 he would also play with Jazz Jamaica, as well as with Linton Kwesi Johnson during this era.

In 1995, Island Records released the album Roots to the Bone, an updated version of Rodriguez's earlier work Man from Wareika. From 1996, among other engagements, he played with Jools Holland's Rhythm and Blues Orchestra and also performed at various ska festivals throughout Europe with his own band. He retired from performing with Jools Holland in 2012.

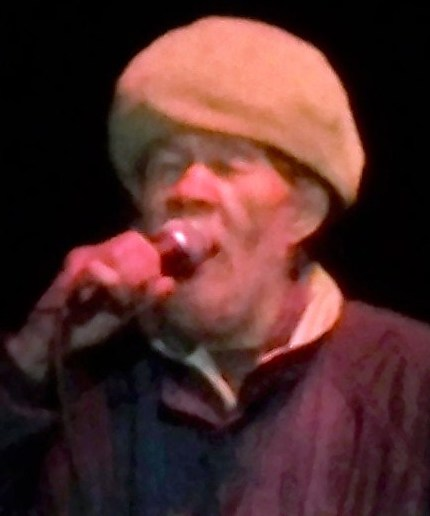
Rodriguez in 2012

He was appointed a Member of the Order of the British Empire (MBE) in the 2007 New Year Honours, for services to music. In October 2012, he was awarded the Silver Musgrave Medal by the Institute of Jamaica in recognition of his contribution to Jamaican music.

== Death ==
On 4 September 2015, following a short illness in a London hospital, Rodriguez died aged 80. A tribute to him by Youthsayers alongside Jerry Dammers was performed at the Lambeth Country Show in 2016 to a crowd of 80,000.

== Discography ==
- Reco in Reggae Land (Paying Tribute to Don Drummond), Pama Records (1969)
- Man from Wareika, Island Records (1976)
- Wareika Dub, Ghetto Rockers (1977)
- That Man Is Forward, 2 Tone Records (1981)
- Jama Rico, 2 Tone Records (1982)
- Rising in the East, Jove Music (1994)
- Return from Wareika Hill, Alpha Enterprise (1994)
- You Must Be Crazy (live, as Rico & His Band), Grover Records (1994)
- Wonderful World, Quattro, (1995)
- Get Up Your Foot, (as Rico & His Band), Grover Records, (2000)
- Going West, (as Rico & Friends), Creole Records (2002)
- Togetherness, (as Rico Rodriguez & Roots to the Bone Band), Subterannia Discos (2005)
- Japa-Rico - Rico Rodriguez Meets Japan, Sony Music (2006)
- Wareika Vibes, Jamdown (2006)

== See also ==
- List of reggae musicians
- List of ska musicians
- List of jazz trombonists
- Island Records discography
- Ska jazz
