= The Specials =

British ska band from Coventry

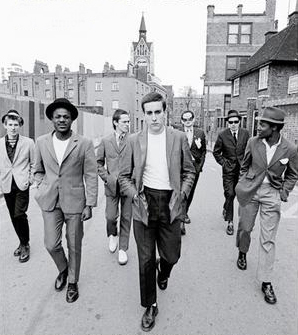

Background information
- Also known as: The Special A.K.A.
- Origin: Coventry, England
- Genres: 2 tone; ska; new wave
- Years active: 1977–1981; 1982–1984; 1993; 1996–2001; 2008–2022
- Labels: 2 Tone; Chrysalis; Virgin; Kuff; Cleopatra
- Spinoffs: Fun Boy Three; The Spatial AKA Orchestra
- Past members: Jerry Dammers; Horace Panter; Lynval Golding; Roddy Radiation; Terry Hall; Neville Staple; John Bradbury; Dick Cuthell; Rico Rodriguez; Rhoda Dakar; Stan Campbell
- Website: thespecials.com

The Specials, also known as the Special A.K.A., were an English 2 tone and ska revival band formed in 1977 in Coventry. The first stable lineup of the group consisted of Terry Hall and Neville Staple on vocals, Jerry Dammers on keyboards, Lynval Golding and Roddy Radiation on guitars, Horace Panter on bass, John Bradbury on drums, and Dick Cuthell and Rico Rodriguez on horns. Their music combined the danceable rhythms of ska and rocksteady with the energy of punk. The lyrics of their songs included political and social commentary. The band wore mod-style "1960s period rude boy outfits (pork pie hats, tonic and mohair suits and loafers)".

In 1980, their The Special A.K.A. Live! EP, of which the lead track was "Too Much Too Young", reached No. 1 on the UK Singles Chart. In 1981, the recession-themed single "Ghost Town" also hit No. 1 in the UK.

After seven consecutive UK top 10 singles between 1979 and 1981, the main lead vocalists Hall and Staple, along with the guitarist Golding, left to form Fun Boy Three. A revised Specials band continued as "the Special A.K.A." (a name that they had used on earlier Specials releases) which released new material until 1984, including the top 10 UK hit single "Free Nelson Mandela", after which their founder Jerry Dammers dissolved the band.

The group reformed in 1993, and performed with varying line-ups, none of which included Dammers, until the death of Terry Hall in December 2022.

== Career ==
=== Founding and early years (1977–1978) ===
The group was formed in 1977 by songwriter and keyboardist Dammers, vocalist Tim Strickland, guitarist/vocalist Lynval Golding, drummer Silverton Hutchinson and bassist Horace Panter (Sir Horace Gentleman). Strickland was replaced by Terry Hall shortly after the band's formation. The band was first called the Automatics, then the Coventry Automatics. Guitarist Roddy Byers (usually known as Roddy Radiation) agreed to join the band in March 1978 ahead of a recording session of demos.

The new line-up changed their name to the Special A.K.A. The Automatics after another band called the Automatics signed a record deal with Island Records. The new name was a bit of a mouthful and was shortened to the Special A.K.A. The name Special A.K.A. soon evolved into the Specials – the moniker that would be used for most of the band's career.

Joe Strummer of the Clash had attended one of their concerts, and invited the Special A.K.A. to open for his band in their "On Parole" UK tour. This performance gave the Special A.K.A. a new level of national exposure, and they briefly shared the Clash's management. During the tour Neville Staple, who was initially one of the roadies, became a full member of the Specials when his version of "Monkey Man" was incorporated into the group's set.

The Specials began at the same time as Rock Against Racism, which was first organised in 1978. According to Dammers, anti-racism was intrinsic to the formation of the Specials, in that the band was formed with the goal of integrating black and white people. Many years later Dammers stated that "Music gets political when there are new ideas in music... punk was innovative, so was ska, and that was why bands such as the Specials and the Clash could be political".

=== Ascendancy of the Specials (1979–1981) ===
In 1979, shortly after drummer Hutchinson left the band to be replaced by John Bradbury, Dammers formed the 2 Tone Records label and released the band's debut single, "Gangsters", a reworking of Prince Buster's "Al Capone". "The Selecter" by The Selecter appeared on the B-side. The fledgling 2 Tone records released "Gangsters" / "The Selecter" in a completely independent do-it-yourself operation. After initial good sales, Rough Trade then agreed to repress and distribute the single through its independent distribution network. In May 1979, John Peel played the record on his influential late night BBC Radio One show. The record became a Top 10 hit that summer.

Following the release and early success of "Gangsters", major record labels lined up with offers to sign the Specials. The aim of the Specials was not only to secure a record deal for the group but to get an agreement that would establish 2 Tone as an independent sub-label. The plan was for 2 Tone to put out singles by non-signed bands who would not be held to any contract. Chrysalis agreed to the terms that would establish 2 Tone as a viable independent label and the Specials would get the backing of a major record company.

The band had begun wearing mod/rude boy/skinhead-style two-tone tonic suits, along with other elements of late 1960s teen fashions. Changing their name to the Specials, they recorded their eponymous debut album in 1979, produced by Elvis Costello. Horn players Dick Cuthell and Rico Rodriguez were featured on the album, but would not be official members of the Specials until their second album.

The Specials led off with Dandy Livingstone's "Rudy, A Message to You" (slightly altering the title to "A Message to You, Rudy") and also had covers of Prince Buster and Toots & the Maytals songs from the late 1960s. In 1980, the EP Too Much Too Young (predominantly credited to the Special A.K.A.) was a No. 1 hit in the UK Singles Chart, despite controversy over the song's lyrics, which reference teen pregnancy and promote contraception.

Reverting once again to the name of the Specials, the band's second album, More Specials, was not as commercially successful and was recorded at a time when, according to Hall, conflicts had developed in the band. Female backing vocalists on the Specials' first two studio albums included Chrissie Hynde, Rhoda Dakar (then of the Bodysnatchers and later of the Special A.K.A.), and Belinda Carlisle, Jane Wiedlin and Charlotte Caffey of the Go-Go's. In the first few months of 1981, the band took a break from recording and touring, and then released "Ghost Town", a non-album single, which hit No. 1 in 1981. At their Top of the Pops recording of the song, however, Staple, Hall and Golding announced they were leaving the band. Golding later said: "We didn't talk to the rest of the guys. We couldn't even stay in the same dressing room. We couldn't even look at each other. We stopped communicating. You only realise what a genius Jerry was years later. At the time, we were on a different planet." Shortly afterwards, the three left the band to form Fun Boy Three.

=== Band split, rebirth as the Special A.K.A. (1982–1984) ===
For the next few years, the group was in a seemingly constant state of flux. Adding Dakar to the permanent line-up, the group recorded "The Boiler" with Dakar on vocals, Dammers on keyboards, Bradbury on drums, John Shipley (from the Swinging Cats) on guitar, Cuthell on brass and Nicky Summers on bass. The single was credited to "Rhoda with the Special A.K.A.". The track describes an incident of date rape, and its frank and harrowing depiction of the matter meant that airplay was severely limited. Nevertheless, it managed to reach No. 35 on the UK charts, and American writer Dave Marsh later identified "The Boiler" as one of the 1,001 best "rock and soul" singles of all time in his book The Heart of Rock & Soul.

After going on tour with Rodriguez, the band (without Dakar, and as "Rico and the Special A.K.A.") also recorded the non-charting (and non-album) single "Jungle Music". The line-up for the single was Rodriguez (vocal, trombone), Cuthell (cornets), Dammers (keyboards), Bradbury (drums), Shipley (guitar), returning bassist Panter, and new additions Satch Dickson and Groco (percussion) and Anthony Wymshurst (guitar).

Rodriguez and the three newcomers were all dropped for the next single, "War Crimes", which brought back Dakar and added new co-vocalists Egidio Newton and Stan Campbell, as well as violinist Nick Parker. Follow-up single "Racist Friend" was a minor hit (UK No. 60), with the band establishing themselves as a septet: Dakar, Newton, Campbell, Bradbury, Cuthell, Dammers and Shipley.

The new line-up (still known as the Special A.K.A.) finally issued a new full-length album, In the Studio, in 1984. Officially, the band was now a sextet: Dakar, Campbell, Bradbury, Dammers, Shipley and new bassist Gary McManus. Cuthell, Newton, Panter and Radiation all appeared on the album as guests; as did saxophonist Nigel Reeve, and Claudia Fontaine and Caron Wheeler of the vocal trio Afrodiziak. Both critically and commercially, In The Studio was less successful than previous efforts, although the 1984 single "Free Nelson Mandela" was a No. 9 UK hit. The latter contributed to making Mandela's imprisonment a cause célèbre in the UK, and became popular with anti-apartheid activists in South Africa. Dammers then dissolved the band and pursued political activism.

== Later developments ==
Following the break-up of the original line-up, various members of the band performed in other bands and reformed several times to tour and record in Specials-related projects. However, there was never a complete reunion of the original line-up.

After their departure from the Specials, Golding, Hall and Staple founded the pop band Fun Boy Three and enjoyed commercial success from 1981 to 1983 with hits such as "Tunnel of Love", "It Ain't What You Do (It's the Way That You Do It)", "Our Lips Are Sealed" and "The Lunatics (Have Taken Over the Asylum)". The group ended with Hall's sudden departure, leading to a 15-year rift with Staple.

After Fun Boy Three, Staple and Golding joined Pauline Black of the Selecter in the short-lived band Sunday Best, releasing the single "Pirates on the Airwaves".

In 1990, Bradbury, Golding, Panter and Staple teamed up with members of the Beat to form Special Beat, performing the music of the two bands and other ska and Two Tone classics. The group, undergoing many line-up changes, toured and released several live recordings through the 1990s.

A 1994 single credited to "X Specials" featured Staple, Golding, Radiation, and Panter. A cover of the Slade song "Coz I Luv You", the project was produced by Slade's Jim Lea.

Moving into production and management, Staple "discovered" and produced bhangra pop fusion artist Johnny Zee. Throughout the 1980s and 1990s, Staple would stay active producing and guesting with a variety of artists, including International Beat, Special Beat, Unwritten Law, Desorden Público, the Planet Smashers and others, as well as leading his own bands and starting the Rude Wear clothing line. He sang with the 1990s Specials line-up, and again from 2009 to 2012.

Panter went on to join with members of the Beat and Dexys Midnight Runners to form General Public, and then Special Beat. He joined the 1990s Specials before training as a primary school teacher at the University of Central England in Birmingham. He continued to play with latter-day Special Neol Davies in the blues outfit Box of Blues. However, he rejoined the band for their 2009 reunion and continued as a member until the group came to an end in December 2022.

Golding teamed up with Dammers for a brief spell of club DJing, and then worked with Coventry band After Tonight. After Special Beat, he went on to lead the Seattle-based ska groups Stiff Upper Lip, and more recently, Pama International, as well as many collaborations with other ska bands. He has also toured with the Beat. He joined the 1990s Specials line-up, but left in 2000. He rejoined in 2009, and remained with the group until its end in 2022.

Radiation fronted and worked with numerous artists including the Tearjerkers (a band that he had begun in the last months of the Specials), the Bonediggers, the Raiders and Three Men & Black (including Jean-Jacques Burnel of the Stranglers), Jake Burns (Stiff Little Fingers), Pauline Black, Bruce Foxton (the Jam), Dave Wakeling (the Beat, General Public) and Nick Welsh (Skaville UK). He also fronts the Skabilly Rebels, a band that mixes rockabilly with ska. He joined the 1990s Specials line-up and again in 2009, continuing to 2014.

Bradbury continued through the Special A.K.A. era, then formed the band JB's Allstars, before moving into production. He joined Special Beat for several years, then a reformed Selecter, before retiring from music to work as an IT specialist. He rejoined the band for their 2009 reunion, and continued to perform with them until his death in 2015.

From 1984 until 1987, Hall fronted the Colourfield, with some commercial success. After they disbanded, he pursued a solo career, working mostly in the new wave genre. He co-wrote a number of early Lightning Seeds releases. He also performed some vocals for a Dub Pistols album. He and Eurythmics member David A. Stewart formed the duo Vegas in the early 1990s, releasing an eponymous album in 1992. Hall joined the Specials for their 2009 reunion, and continued to perform with them until his death in 2022.

In 2006, Dammers formed large, jazz-style ensemble the Spatial AKA Orchestra.

== Reunions ==
=== The Specials Mk.2 (1993–1998) ===
The first reunion under the Specials name occurred in 1993. Producer Roger Lomas was asked by Trojan Records to get some musicians together to back ska legend Desmond Dekker on a new album. He approached all members of the Specials and the four that were willing to participate were Roddy Radiation, Neville Staple, Lynval Golding and Horace Panter, they were also joined by Aitch Bembridge, who had been the drummer in the Selecter. In the 1970s, Bembridge had played with soul singer Ray King, who mentored and worked with Dammers, Staple, Golding and Hutchinson in their days before the Specials. A group of studio musicians filled out the band, including keyboardist Mark Adams. The album, released by Trojan Records as King of Kings, was credited to Desmond Dekker and the Specials.

The release of the album with Desmond Dekker created some buzz for the band, and led to an offer from a Japanese promoter to book a tour. Rejoined by Golding, along with Bembridge & Adams from the "King of Kings" sessions, the band added horn players Adam Birch and Jonathan Read and began rehearsing and playing live. Initially using the names the Coventry Specials, The X Specials, and Specials2, they shortly reverted to the Specials after accepting that it was the name promoters were using anyway, although the line-up was referred to as Specials MkII by those involved. This line-up went on to tour internationally and released two studio albums: Today's Specials, a collection of mostly reggae and ska covers in 1996, and Guilty 'til Proved Innocent! in 1998, a collection of original compositions. The band toured heavily in support of both releases – including headlining the Vans Warped Tour – and received positive reviews of their live shows.

Despite the live success, the band fizzled out after a 1998 Japan tour (which Panter missed due to illness), although limited touring with a different line-up continued into 2000.

After completing a similar project with The Selecter in 1999, Roger Lomas brought the group back into the studio to record a number of classic songs from the Trojan Records back catalogue. Two weeks before this project, Golding left the group to return to Seattle. Turning to another Selecter veteran for help, the band replaced him on guitar with Neol Davies. Davies, Staple, Radiation and Panter, joined by a group of session musicians, recorded a wealth of tracks that eventually saw release by Trojan sub-label Receiver Records as Skinhead Girl in 2000 and Conquering Ruler in 2001.

=== The Specials reunion (2008–2022) ===
==== Terry Hall & Friends ====
In 2007, Hall teamed up with Golding for the first time in 24 years, to play Specials songs at two music festivals. At Glastonbury Festival, they appeared on the Pyramid Stage with Lily Allen to perform "Gangsters". In May 2009, Golding claimed that Allen's reuniting him with Hall played a "massive part" in the group's later reformation. Later the same day, they played on the Park Stage, with Damon Albarn of Blur on piano and beatboxer Shlomo providing rhythm, to perform "A Message to You, Rudy". At GuilFest, Golding joined the Dub Pistols to again perform "Gangsters". In 2007, Golding regularly performed concerts and recorded with Pama International, a collective of musicians who were members of Special Beat.

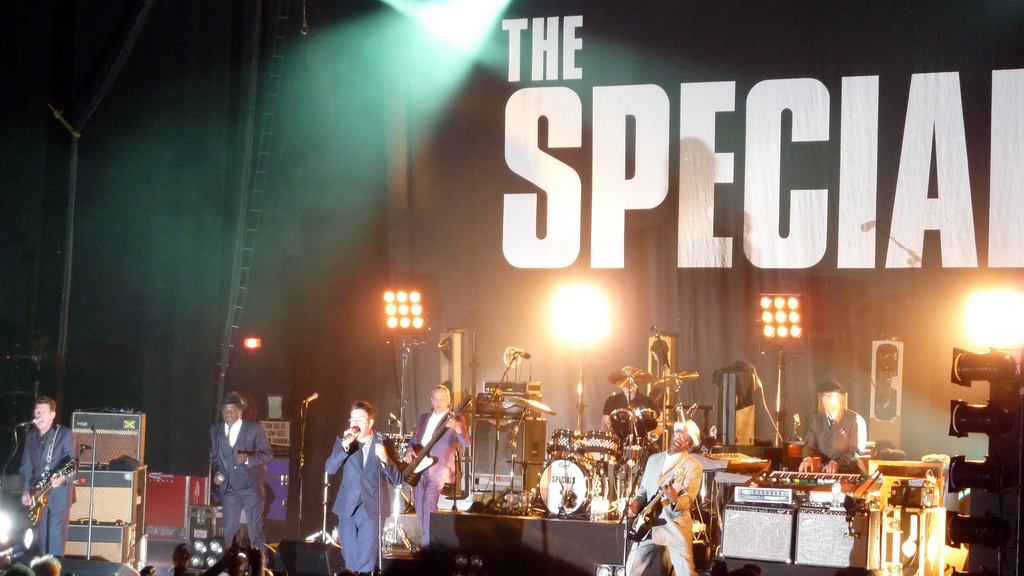
The Specials performing at Brixton Academy, London, May 2009 as part of their 30th anniversary tour

On 30 March 2008, Hall stated that the Specials would be reforming for tour dates in autumn 2008, and possibly for some recording. This was officially confirmed on 7 April 2008. On 6 September 2008, six members of the band performed on the main stage at the Bestival, billed as the "Surprise Act". By December 2008, the band had announced 2009 tour dates to celebrate their 30th anniversary, although founder member Dammers was not joining the band on the tour.

Hall was quoted as saying, "The door remains open to him". However, Dammers described the new reunion as a "takeover" and claimed he had been forced out of the band. Around that same time, longtime Specials fan Amy Winehouse joined Dammers onstage at Hyde Park, singing the song he wrote for the Specials, "Free Nelson Mandela", for Mandela's 90th birthday concert, dubbed 46664 after Mandela's prison number, and also the name of his AIDS charity, which received money raised by the birthday bash.

==== 30th Anniversary Tour and beyond ====
On 10 April 2009, the Specials guested on BBC Two's Later... with Jools Holland. The following month, Bradbury and Golding expressed their intentions to release further original Specials material at a later date. On 8 June 2009, it was announced that the Specials would embark on a second leg of their 30th anniversary tour, taking in the locations and venues that they missed earlier in the year. In July and August 2009, the Specials toured Australia and Japan. In October, the band picked up the Inspiration Award at the Q Awards. In 2010, they performed at the Dutch festival Lowlands.

In an interview at the Green Room in Manchester in November 2010, Hall confirmed that there would be further Specials dates in the autumn of 2011, and confessed to having enjoyed playing live again: "It's a celebration of something that happened in your life that was important, and we're going to do that again next year, but then maybe that'll be it". In late 2010, the band re-released "A Message to You, Rudy" as a Haiti Special Fund available to download from iTunes in both the UK and the US, with proceeds going to aid the UNICEF effort to help children in earthquake-stricken Haiti.

In February 2012, it was announced that the Specials would perform at Hyde Park with Blur and New Order to celebrate the 2012 Summer Olympics closing ceremony. Panter said that the band were excited to be involved in such a momentous event: "We have been keeping it under our pork pie hats for a month or so now. I think it is going to be the only chance people get to see the Specials performing in the UK this year." The Specials' performance was said to have remained synonymous with Britain's political and social upheaval of the late 1970s and early 1980s.

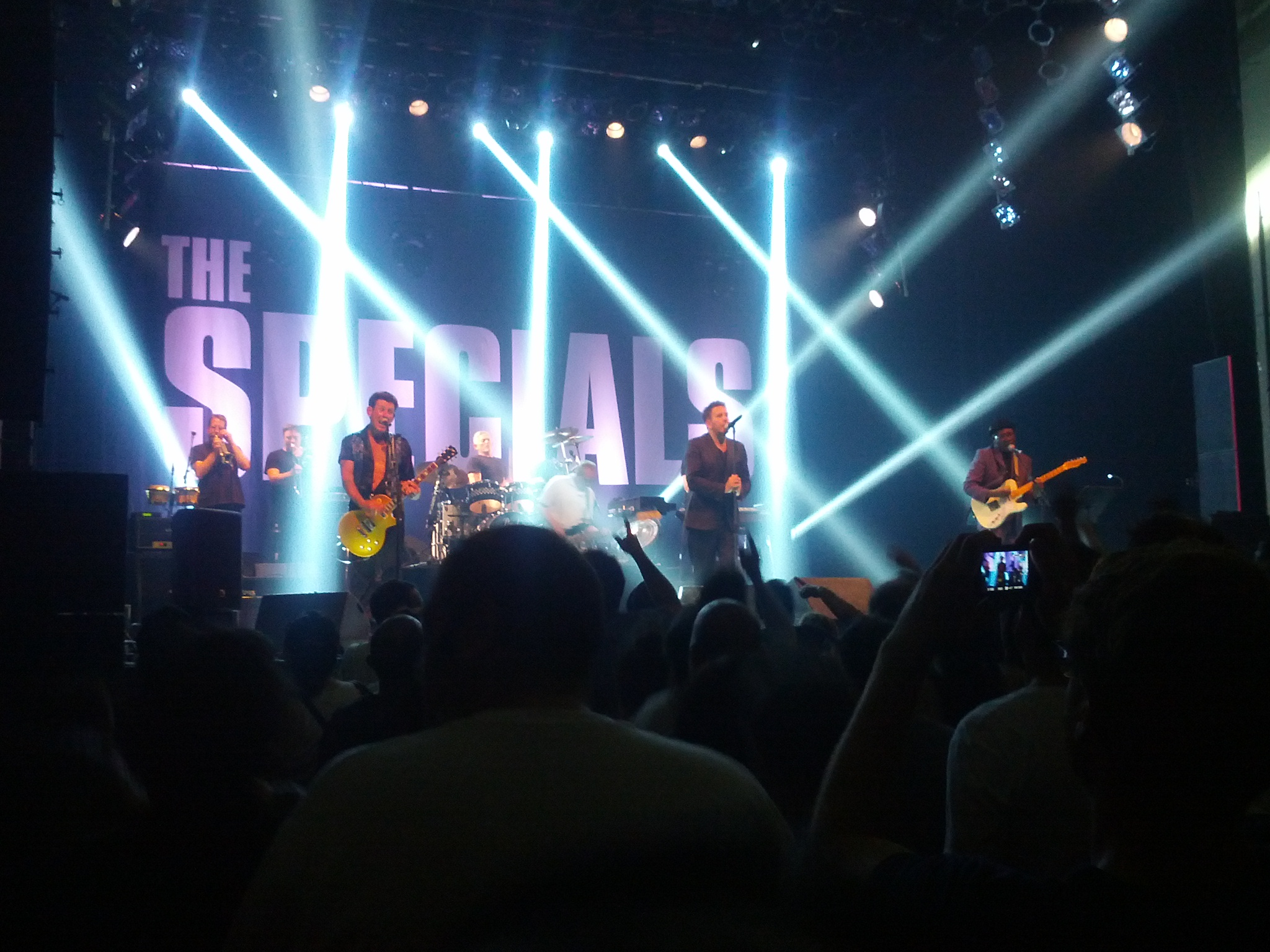
The Specials performing at Métropolis, Montreal, 7 July 2013

In August 2012, the Specials released a new live album, More... Or Less. – The Specials Live, featuring "the best of the best" performances from their 2011 European tour, selected by the band themselves on a double-disc CD and double-vinyl LP.

==== Departures of Neville Staple and Roddy Radiation ====
In January 2013, the Specials announced the departure of Staple with the following message on their website: "We are very sad Neville cannot join us on the Specials' UK tour in May 2013 or indeed on the future projects we have planned. He has made a huge contribution to the fantastic time and reception we have received since we started and reformed in 2009. However, he missed a number of key shows last year due to ill health, and his health is obviously much more important. We wish him the very best for the future".

The Specials completed a North American tour in 2013, performing to sold-out crowds in Chicago, Los Angeles, San Diego, San Francisco, Seattle, Portland and Vancouver.

In February 2014, it was revealed that Roddy Radiation had left the reformed group. In spite of his departure, the Specials played an extensive tour in the autumn of 2014 with Steve Cradock (Ocean Colour Scene, Paul Weller) as lead guitarist.

==== Death of John Bradbury ====
Drummer John Bradbury died on 28 December 2015 at the age of 62. On 22 March 2016, The Specials announced that The Libertines drummer Gary Powell would be performing on their upcoming tours. Powell was replaced by PJ Harvey and Jazz Jamaica drummer Kenrick Rowe on the Encore album and subsequent tour.

==== Encore and Protest Songs 1924–2012 ====
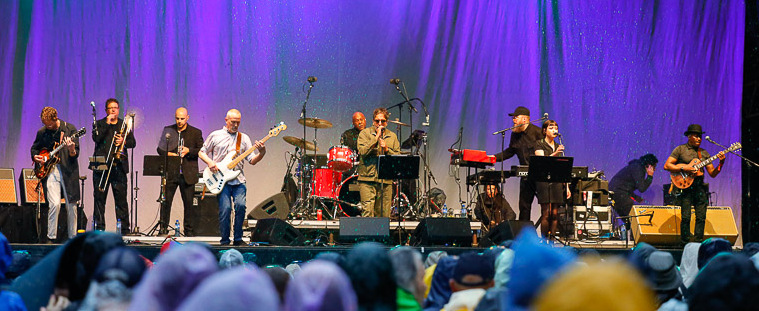
The Specials performing in 2022

In 2017, the band invited 20-year-old Birmingham native Saffiyah Khan to a show after a photo of her confronting an "English Defence League goon" in a Specials t-shirt at a counter-demonstration went viral. Less than two years later, Khan had performed on stage for the first time, recorded a song and toured North America with the band.

On 29 October 2018, the Specials announced a UK tour in 2019 to coincide with the release of a new album, Encore.

On 1 February 2019, the band announced a spring North American tour to promote the 1 February 2019 release of Encore (out via Island Records). The following week, Encore debuted at number 1 on the UK Albums Chart, giving the band their first chart-topping album since 1980. During 2019, the Specials invited 17-year-old artist and photographer Sterling Chandler to join the tour.

In March 2021, the band announced a UK tour. On 7 July 2021, Horace Panter announced a new 12-track Specials album that was released on 23 August 2021, titled Protest Songs 1924–2012. Vocalist Hannah Hu joined the band for their 2021 tour and also sang on the new album.

==== Death of Terry Hall ====
On 19 December 2022, the Specials announced on social media that Terry Hall had died at age 63 after a brief illness which was later revealed to be pancreatic cancer. They had planned to record a new album in the United States before Hall's health deteriorated.

In a 2023 interview, bass player Horace Panter confirmed that the Specials had ceased to be following Hall's death. He stated, "It would be ludicrous to tour without Terry, so yes, that's definitely the end of the Specials".

In December 2024, Sky Arts aired The Specials: Live From Coventry Cathedral, the last-filmed concert by the band before Hall's death in 2022. The show was directed by Hall's wife Lindy Heymann.

== Members ==
=== Classic line-up ===
- Terry Hall – lead vocals (1977–1981, 2008–2022; his death)
- Lynval Golding – rhythm and lead guitar, vocals (1977–1981, 1993, 1994–1998, 2008–2022)
- Horace Panter – bass guitar (1977–1981, 1982, 1993, 1994–1998, 2000–2001, 2008–2022)
- Jerry Dammers – keyboards, principal songwriter, vocals (1977–1984)
- Roddy Radiation – lead guitar, vocals (1978–1981, 1993, 1996–2001, 2008–2014)
- Neville Staple – toasting, vocals, percussion (1978–1981, 1993, 1996–2001, 2008–2012)
- John Bradbury – drums (1979–1984, 2008–2015; his death)
- Dick Cuthell – flugelhorn, trumpet (1979–1984)
- Rico Rodriguez – trombone, vocals (1979–1981, 1982; died 2015)

== Discography ==
=== As The Specials ===
- The Specials (1979)
- More Specials (1980)
- Today's Specials (1996)
- Guilty 'til Proved Innocent! (1998)
- Skinhead Girl (2000)
- Conquering Ruler (2001)
- Encore (2019)
- Protest Songs 1924–2012 (2021)

=== As The Special A.K.A. ===
- In the Studio (1984)
