= Two-tone (music genre) =

British popular music of the late 1970s and early 1980s

- Other names: 2 tone; ska-rock; ska revival
- Stylistic origins: Ska; rocksteady; reggae; punk rock; new wave
- Cultural origins: Late 1970s, Coventry, England
- Derivative forms: Ska punk; new tone

Other topics
- 2 Tone Records; reggae rock

Two-tone, or 2 tone, also known as ska revival, is a genre of British popular music of the late 1970s and early 1980s that fused traditional Jamaican ska, rocksteady, and reggae music with elements of punk rock and new wave music. Its name derives from 2 Tone Records, a record label founded in 1979 by Jerry Dammers of the Specials, and references a desire to transcend and defuse racial tensions in Thatcher-era Britain: many two-tone groups, such as the Specials, the Selecter and the Beat, featured a mix of black, white, and multiracial people.

Originating in Coventry in the West Midlands of England in the late 1970s, it was part of the second wave of ska music. It followed on from the first ska music that developed in Jamaica in the 1950s and 1960s, infused with punk and new wave textures.

Although two-tone's mainstream commercial appeal was largely limited to the UK, it influenced the ska punk movement that developed in the US in the late 1980s and 1990s.

== History ==
The two-tone sound originated among young musicians in Coventry in the West Midlands of England, who grew up listening to 1960s Jamaican music. They combined influences from ska, reggae and rocksteady with elements of punk rock and new wave. Bands considered part of the genre include the Specials, the Selecter, Madness, the Beat, Bad Manners, the Bodysnatchers and Akrylykz.

The Specials' keyboard player Jerry Dammers coined the term "two-tone". Dammers, with the assistance of Horace Panter and graphic designer John "Teflon" Sims, developed the iconic Walt Jabsco logo (a man in a black suit, white shirt, black tie, pork pie hat, white socks and black loafers) to represent the two-tone genre. The logo, based on an early album-cover photo of Peter Tosh, included an added black-and-white check pattern.

Most of the bands considered to be part of the two-tone genre were signed to 2 Tone Records (operative 1979–1985) at some point. Other record labels associated with the two-tone sound were Stiff Records and Go Feet Records. The music was especially popular among skinheads, rudies and mod revivalists.

=== Museum ===
On 1 October 2010, the 2-Tone Central museum, cafe and venue opened in the Coventry University Students' Union building, and by August 2011 it had moved to the 2-Tone Village in Stoke, Coventry. It includes exhibition space and the Coventry Music Wall of Fame.
