= Lias Saoudi =

British musician and writer

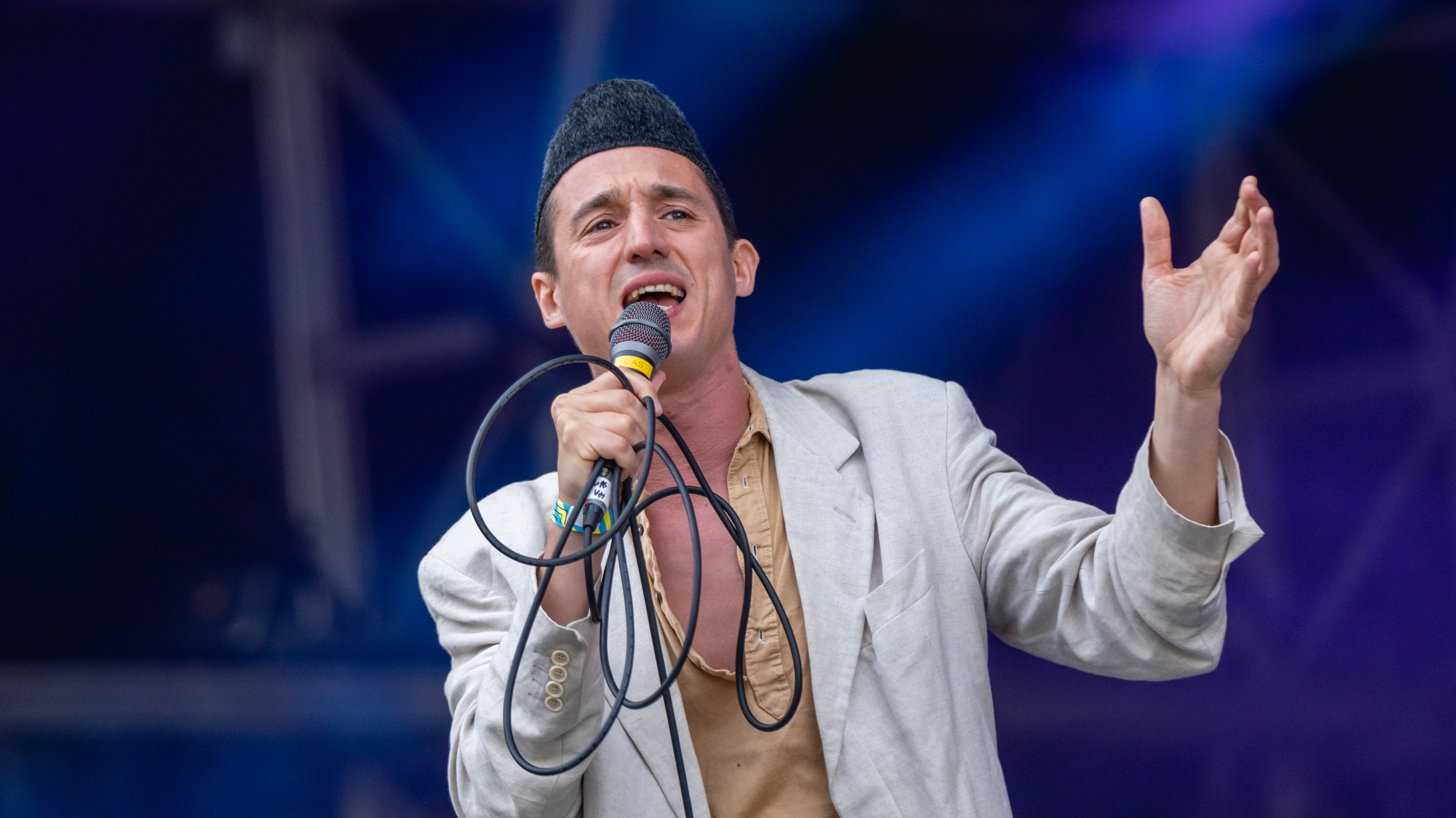
- Saoudi performing with Fat White Family in 2021

Background information
- Born: Southampton
- Education: Slade School of Fine Arts
- Genres: Post-punk; experimental rock
- Occupations: Musician; Writer
- Member of: Fat White Family; The Moonlandingz; Decius

Lias Saoudi is a founding (and only constant) member of English rock band Fat White Family, and also performs with The Moonlandingz and Decius. He was also in the original lineup of Warmduscher.

Saoudi was born in Southampton and grew up in Scotland and Northern Ireland. His father was from Algeria and his mother from Yorkshire.

He attended the Slade School of Fine Art in London.

== Musical career ==
Lias Saoudi formed The Saudis with his brother Nathan and Alex Sebley. Upon returning to the UK following an Algerian tour, the band "collapsed"; Sebley left the band and was replaced by Saul Adamczewski after the breakdown of his own band The Metros.

In 2011, Saoudi and Adamczewski formed Fat White Family while living in a squat in Peckham, South London.

Saoudi was involved in numerous musical projects in the mid-2010s; In 2014 Decius released their first single, Come To Me Villa, Warmduscher was formed in the same year with Saoudi as a founding member, and the following year he formed The Moonlandingz.

In the late 2010s to early 2020s, Saoudi's musical projects began to gain wider critical acclaim; Fat White Family released Serfs Up! in 2019, their first album on a major label (Domino), which was described as a "giant leap forward" by The Guardian, while Decius released their debut album Decius Vol. I which made multiple album of the year lists in 2022.

== Writing ==
Saoudi started publishing autobiographical pieces on The Social Gathering during the 2020 COVID-19 lockdown in the United Kingdom under the title Life Beyond the Neutral Zone.

His work was included in the 2021 anthology of contemporary Irish authors The New Frontier: Reflections From the Irish Border.

He is a guest editor for Ambit Pop, a new version of the literary magazine Ambit.

In 2022 he published his semi-autobiographical book Ten Thousand Apologies, covering his childhood and the history of Fat White Family. Co-written with Adelle Stripe, the book became a Sunday Times Bestseller and was named Rough Trade Records' Book of the Year. It was shortlisted for the Penderyn Music Book Prize.

== Bibliography ==
- The New Frontier: Reflections From the Irish Border. New Island Books, 2021.
- Ten Thousand Apologies: Fat White Family and the Miracle of Failure. White Rabbit, 2022.
