= Wide Awake (festival) =

Yearly outdoor music festival in London

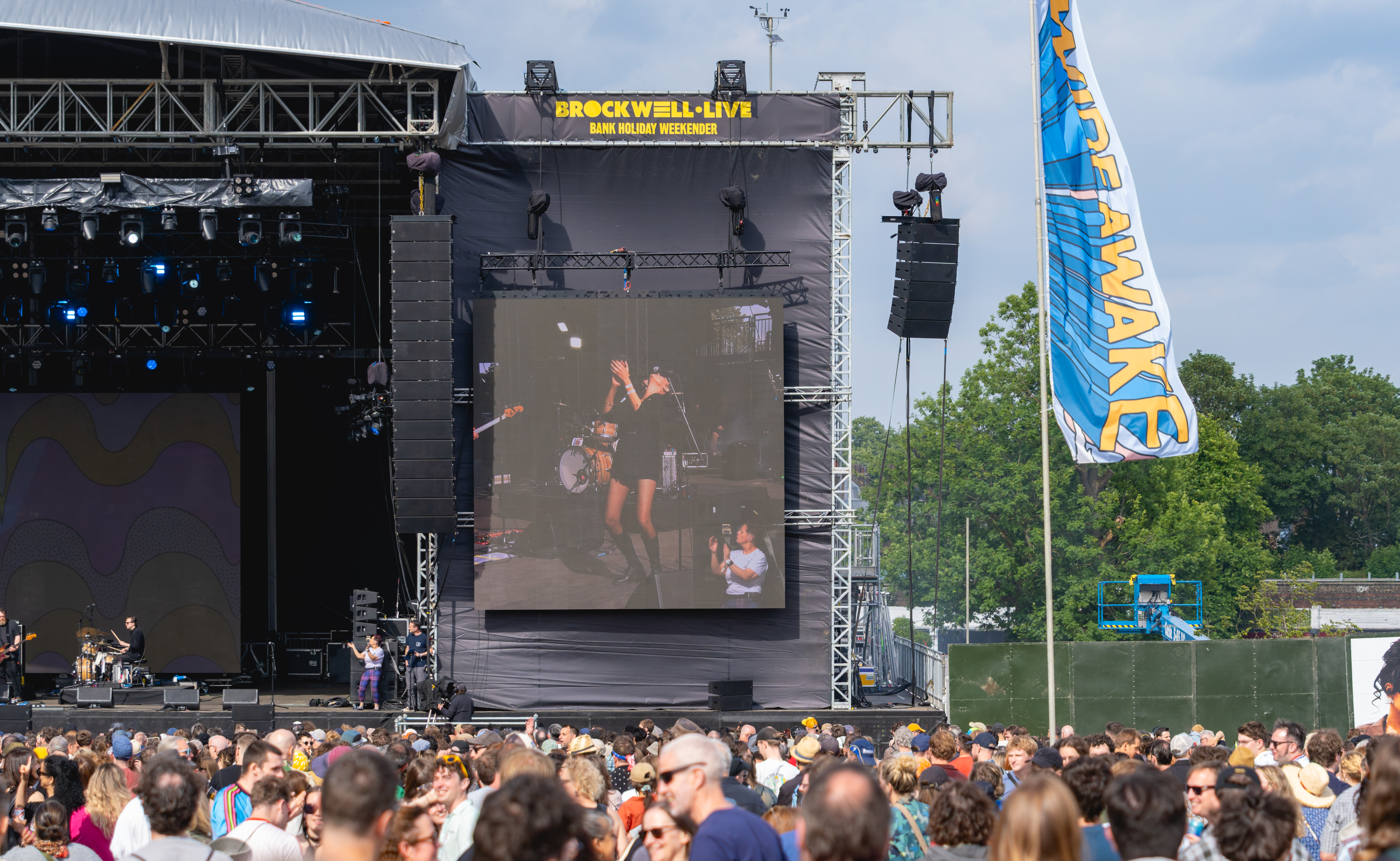
- Wide Awake 2025
- Genre: Indie rock, Post-punk, Electronica, Alternative pop
- Location: Brockwell Park
- Years active: 2021 – present
- Founders: Keith Miller (owner of Bad Vibrations and head programmer at LNZRT), Marcus Weedon (Brockwell Live festival director)
- Website: https://wideawakelondon.co.uk

Wide Awake is a yearly outdoor music festival held in Brockwell Park in London. It was first held in 2021 and its programming largely focuses on electronica, alternative pop, and post-punk. It has seen headline performances by acts like Idles, Primal Scream, King Gizzard & the Lizard Wizard, Young Fathers, and Kneecap.

== History ==
It was first held in Brockwell Park in the London Borough of Lambeth on 3 September 2021 and has been held there each year since, although usually at the end of May. Its programming is a collaboration between music bookers Bad Vibrations, Dimensions, LNZRT and Snap Crackle & Pop.

The festival was founded by Keith Miller (who runs the music promotion company Bad Vibrations, is head programmer at LNZRT and head of events at several small London venues) and festival director Marcus Weedon. They had previously worked together on the London festival Field Day. The first edition of the festival had been planned for 5 June 2020, but was cancelled due to the COVID-19 pandemic.

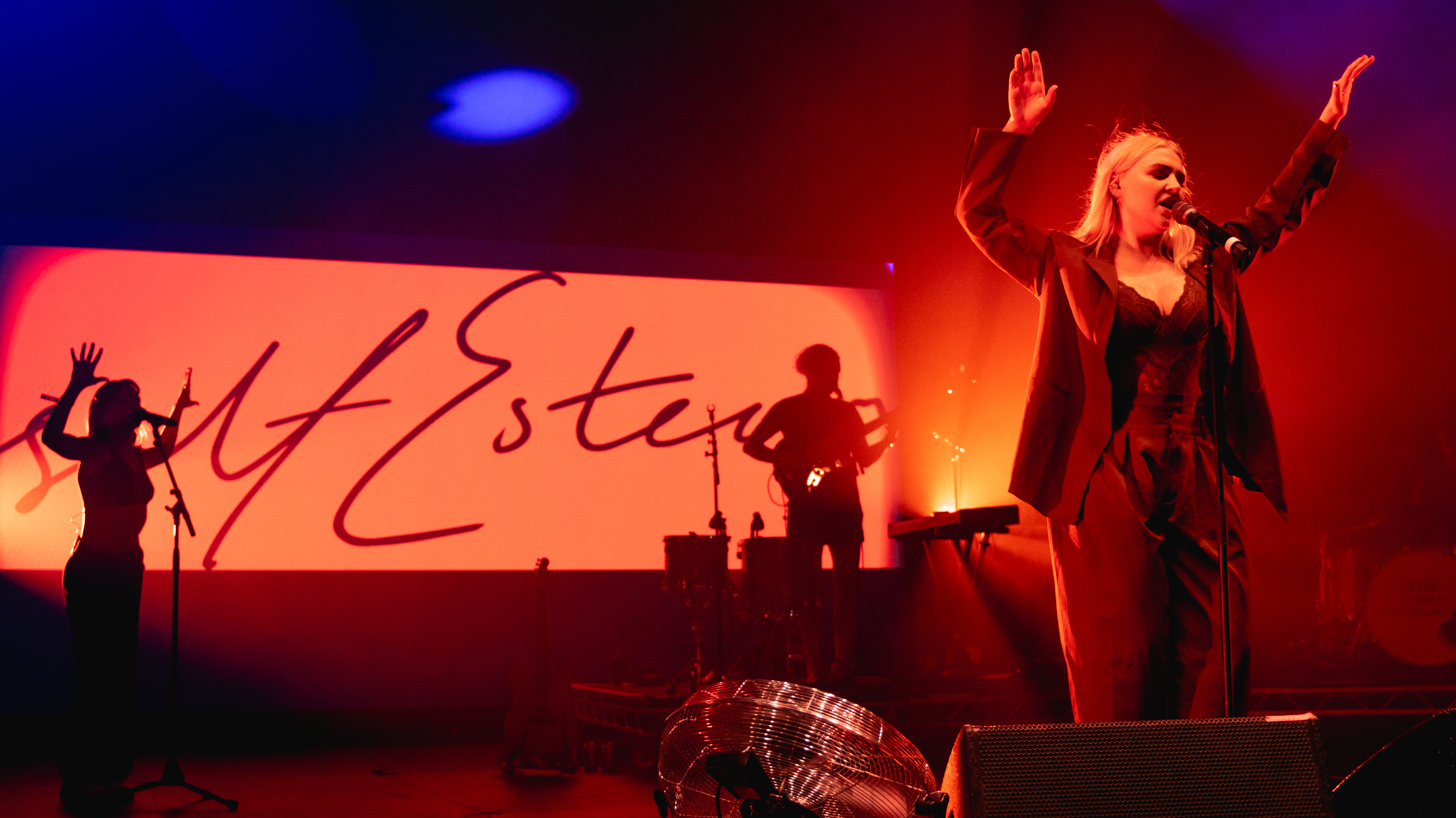
Self Esteem at Wide Awake 2021

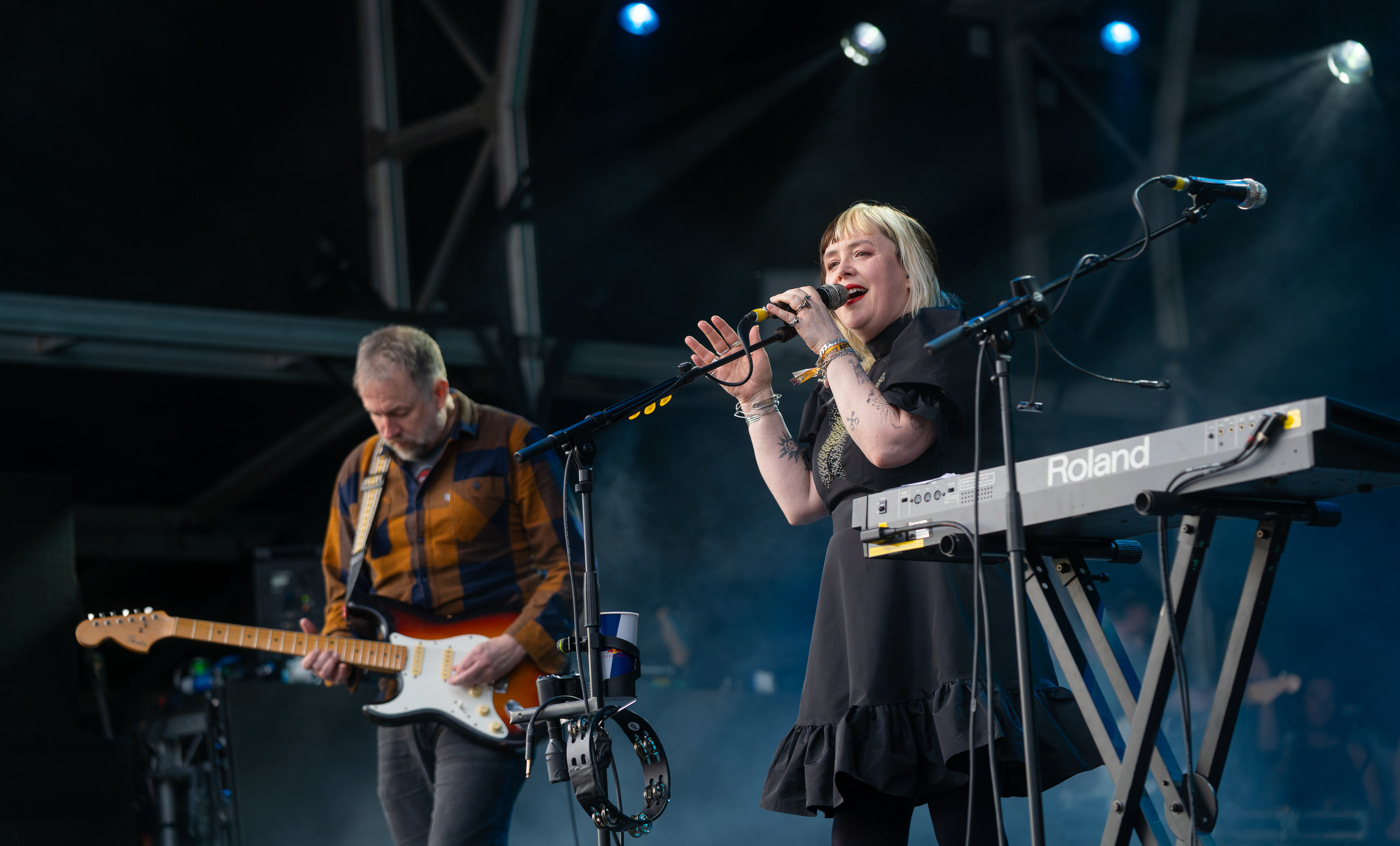
Slowdive at Wide Awake 2024

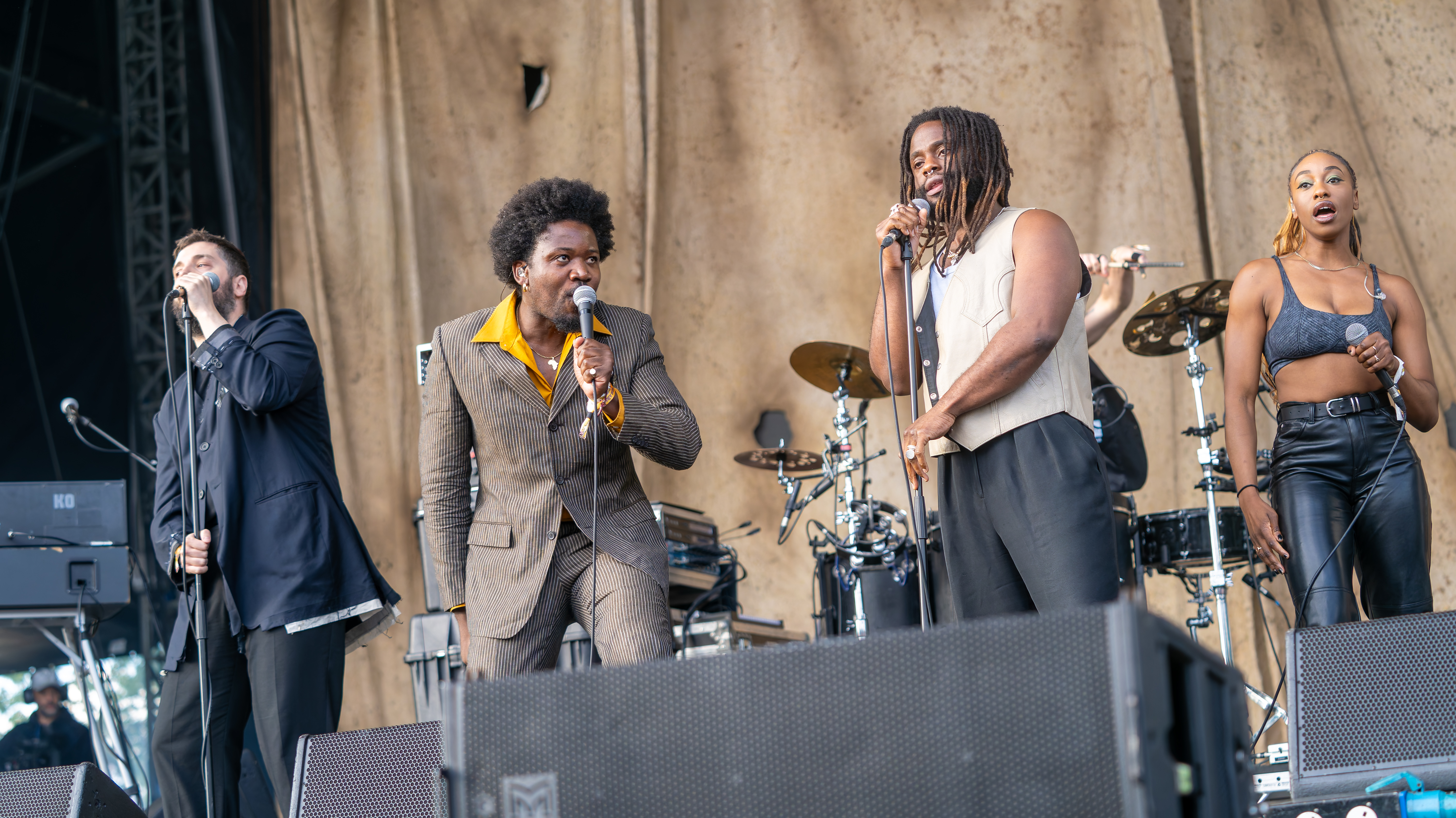
Young Fathers at Wide Awake 2024

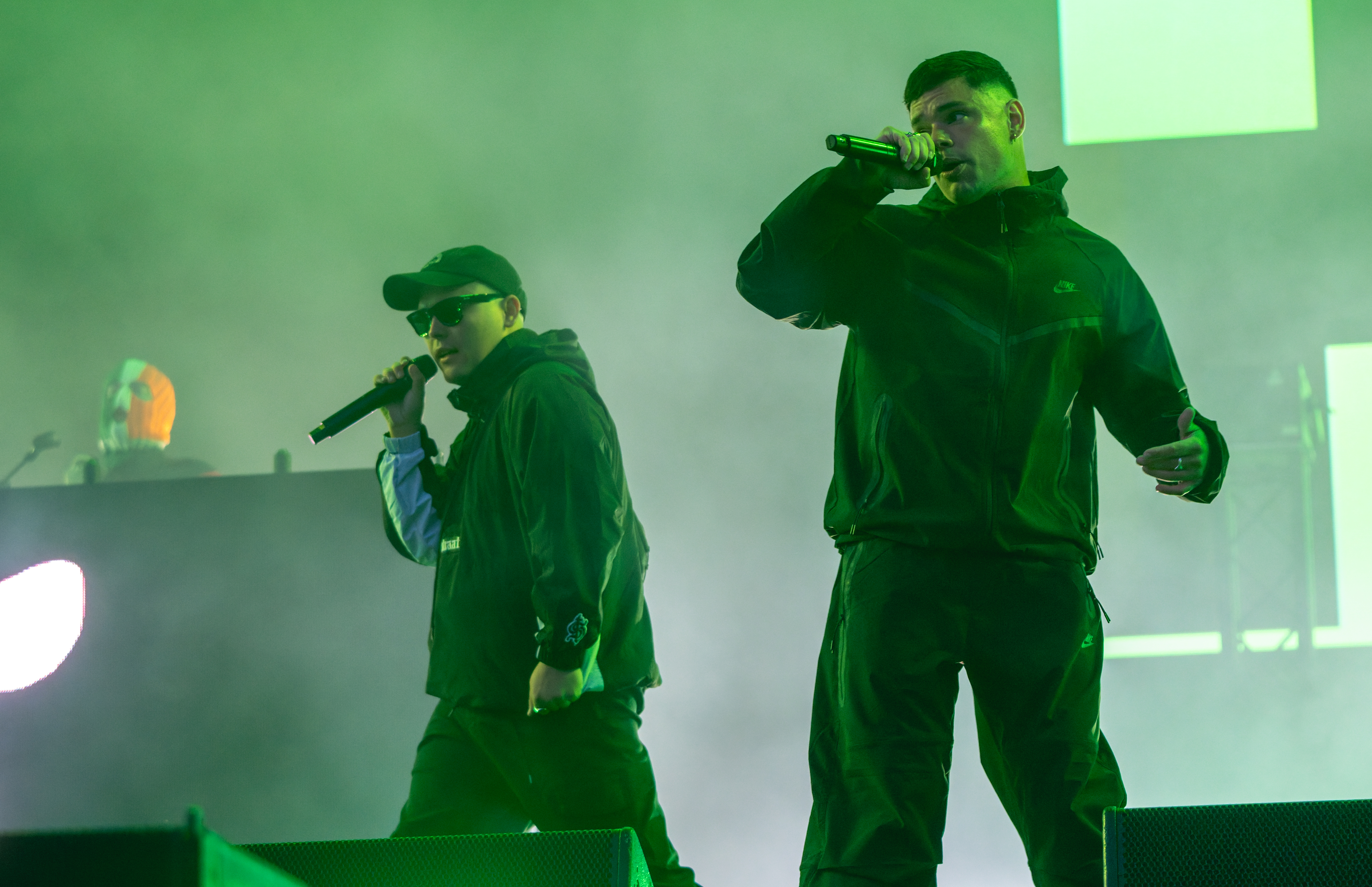
Kneecap at Wide Awake 2025

== Line-ups ==
Date	Bands
3 September 2021	A Certain Ratio, Black Midi, Boy Harsher, Crack Cloud, Daniel Avery, Dream Wife, Dr. Rubinstein, Erol Alkan, Lena Willikens, The Mauskovic Dance Band, Scalping, Songhoy Blues, Tinariwen, Tropical Fuck Storm, Idles, Black Country, New Road, Shame, Goat Girl, The Murder Capital, Kokoroko, Lazarus Kane, Porridge Radio, PVA, Squid, Dry Cleaning, Lynks, Snapped Ankles, White Flowers, Self Esteem
27–28 May 2022	Bicep, Primal Scream, Caribou, Working Men's Club, Floating Points, Fat White Family, Leon Vynehall, The Comet Is Coming, Alewya, Call Super, Elkka, Grove, Loraine James, Louise Chen, Mandy, Indiana, Optimo (Espacio), Yard Act, Overmono, Boy Harsher, Fatoumata Diawara, Kevin Morby, Alex Cameron, Connan Mockasin, The Horrors, Katy J Pearson, Altın Gün, KEG, Sorry, The Golden Dregs, The Lounge Society, The Umlauts, Croatian Amor, Elena Colombi, Fulu Miziki, Identified Patient, Kiara Scuro, Marcus Harris, Melts, Modern Woman, Vladimir Ivkovic, Faye Webster, Chubby and the Gang, Special Interest, Surfbort, Sweeping Promises, Tropical Fuck Storm, Unschooling, Kampire, Billy Nomates, Coco Maria, Amyl and the Sniffers, Nation of Language, Curses, Fergus Clark, Harry James, Marcus Harris, Nathan Gregory Wilkins, Pist Idiots, Tia Cousins, Trish K, Veronica Vasicka
27 May 2023	Caroline Polachek, Daniel Avery, Oneohtrix Point Never, Osees, Shygirl, Ty Segall, Arooj Aftab, Coucou Chloe, Gilla Band, Jockstrap, Joy Orbison, Molchat Doma, Sunset Rollercoaster, VTSS, A Place To Bury Strangers, Blondshell, Butch Cassidy, Enumclaw, Erol Alkan, Glass Beams, Habibi Funk, Lebanon Hanover, Madmadmad, Naima Bock, Optimo (Espacio), Σtella, The Bug Club, The Underground Youth, Alex G, Viagra Boys, Black Country, New Road, Two Shell, Tirzah, Los Bitchos, Civic, Wasted Youth, Clamm, O., Nice Biscuit, JJUUJJUU, Warmduscher, Nuha Ruby Ra, Cola, Gretyl Hanlyn, Mary in the Junkyard
25 May 2024	King Gizzard and the Lizard Wizard, Young Fathers, Squid, Ben UFO and Helena Hauff, Alice Glass, C.O.F.F.I.N., Babe Rainbow, The Dare, Decius, Etran De L’air, Crumb, Eartheater, Upchuck, YHWH Nailgun, Slowdive, Modeselektor, Sevdaliza, The New Eves, Model/Actriz, Charlotte Adigéry & Bolis Pupul, Bodega, HTRK, Fat Dog, Lynks, Plantoid, Lambrini Girls, Hannah Diamond, Dry Cleaning, The Itch, yeule
23 May 2025	Kneecap, CMAT, English Teacher, Peaches, Cobrah, Daniel Avery, Fcukers, Mannequin Pussy, Marie Davidson, Nadine Shah, Psychedelic Porn Crumpets, Puzzle, Sega Bodega, Sprints, Warmduscher, Acopia, Chanel Beads, Donny Benét, Erol Alkan, Optimo (Espacio), Famous, Frankie & the Witch Fingers, Gaye Su Akyol, Getdown Services, Gurriers, Hello Mary, Hitech, Jasmine.4.t., Luvcat, Martin Rev, VJ Divine Enfant, Mermaid Chunky, Patriarchy, Sextile, Snõõper, True Blue Ugly, W.I.T.C.H., Wine Lips, Yuuf, Fat Dog, bdrmm, Curtisy, deBasement, 3L3D3P, RIP Magic
