= No Rocket Required =

Studio album by The Moonlandingz
- Released: 25 April 2025
- Genre: Pop
- Length: 40:12
- Label: Transgressive
- Producer: Adrian Flanagan; Dean Honer; Ross Orton; Lias Saoudi; Jessica Winter; Wuh Oh

The Moonlandingz chronology
Interplanetary Class Classics (2017)	No Rocket Required (2025)

Singles from No Rocket Required
- 1. "The Sign of a Man" Released: 21 January 2025; 2. "Give Me More" Released: 24 February 2025

No Rocket Required is the second studio album by English rock band the Moonlandingz. It was released on 25 April 2025 by Transgressive Records in vinyl, CD and digital formats.

== Background ==
Released eight years after the band's debut album, Interplanetary Class Classics, No Rocket Required incorporates elements of rock, pop, funk and disco. The album consists of ten tracks with a total runtime of approximately forty minutes, and features contributions from Ewen Bremner, Nadine Shah and Iggy Pop. Its first and second singles, "The Sign of a Man" and "Give Me More", were released on 21 January and 24 February 2025.

== Reception ==
Professional ratings
Review scores
Source	Rating
Dork	4/5 stars
Louder Than War	4/5 stars
Mojo	3/5 stars
MusicOMH	4/5 stars

John Murphy of MusicOMH rated the album four stars and compared it to the band's debut project, Interplanetary Class Classic, noting the similarities in the two albums, such as the "riotous, inventive, scuzzy rock-synth tracks with an impressive cast list of guest artists."

Louder Than War assigned it a rating of four out of five, stating "No Rocket Required finds the remaining crew in fine fettle, with plenty to say and as with their first offering, a host of willing accomplices from either end of pop's space-time continuum." BrooklynVegan, in its review of the album, commented that No Rocket Required is reflective of the band's "tender side" and "new maturity".

Andrew Perry of Mojo gave the album a three-star rating and noted it as leaning "more towards ironised easy listening and '80s disco, topped with compulsively gut-churning lyrics." Dork, rating the album four out of five, referred to it as "an album that's both a critique of modern life and a celebration of its absurdities."

== Track listing ==
No Rocket Required track listing
No.	Title	Writer(s)	Producer(s)	Length
1.	"Some People's Music" (featuring Ewen Bremner)	Adrian Flanagan; Dean Honer; Lias Saoudi; Sydney Minsky-Sargeant	Ross Orton	3:23
2.	"The Sign of a Man"	Flanagan; Honer; Saoudi; Minsky-Sargeant; Alex White	Honer	3:13
3.	"Roustabout" (featuring Nadine Shah)	Flanagan; Honer; Saoudi; Minsky-Sargeant; Ross Orton; White	Honer; Flanagan	4:13
4.	"The Insects Have Been Shat On"	Flanagan; Honer; Mairead O'Connor; Saoudi; Minsky-Sargeant; Orton	Orton	4:36
5.	"It's Where I'm From" (featuring Iggy Pop)	Flanagan; Honer; White	Flanagan; Honer	3:19
6.	"All Out of Pop"	Flanagan; Honer; Saoudi; Sean Lennon; Orton	Orton	2:49
7.	"Yama Yama"	Flanagan; Honer; Saoudi	Flanagan; Honer	2:53
8.	"Give Me More"	Flanagan; Honer; Saoudi; Minsky-Sargeant; Orton; White	Orton	2:58
9.	"Stink Foot" (featuring Jessica Winter)	Flanagan; Honer; Minsky-Sargeant; Peter Ferguson; Jessica Winter	Winter; Wuh Oh	3:08
10.	"The Krack Drought Suite (Pts 1–3)"	Flanagan; Honer	Flanagan; Honer; Saoudi	9:40
Total length:				40:12

== Personnel ==
Credits adapted from the album's liner notes.

=== The Moonlandingz ===
- Saul Adamczewski (Note: Adamczewski is credited as a member of the band during recording, but is not attributed to any contributions.)
- Adrian Flanagan – bass guitar (tracks 1, 3–5), backing vocals (1, 3, 5, 6, 8), synthesizers (2, 4, 7, 10); guitar, strings, engineering (3, 5); harpsichord (3, 6), effects (3, 7, 10), organ (4), beats (5, 7), Mellotron (5, 10), glockenspiel (5), vocoder (6); drones, ancient pipes, balalaika (7); bass synthesizer (8); piano, arrangement (9); drum machine, dubs (10)
- Dean Honer – mixing (all tracks), engineering (1–5, 7, 8, 10) synthesizers (1–3, 5–8, 10), beats (1, 2, 7), EMS synthesizer (4, 9), theremin (6), effects (7, 10); drones, ancient pipes, balalaika (7); dubs (8, 10); Mellotron, drum machine (10)
- Mairead O'Connor – electric guitar (4)
- Lias Saoudi – lead vocals (2–4, 7, 8, 10), production (10)

=== Additional contributors ===
- Oliver Harrap – drums (1–6, 8), backing vocals (1), rototoms (6, 8)
- Ross Orton – engineering (1, 4, 6, 8, 9), drum machine programming (4), electronic drum programming (6); synthesizers, dubs (8)
- Sydney Minsky-Sargeant – guitar, synthesizer (1, 8); bass (2), electric guitar (2, 4), Omnichord (4)
- Ewen Bremner – lead vocals (1)
- Alex White – saxophone (2–6, 8), flute (3–5, 8), backing vocals (3)
- Hannah Hu – backing vocals (2, 4, 5, 8)
- Nadine Shah – lead vocals (3)
- Iggy Pop – lead vocals (5)
- Sean Ono Lennon – synthesizer, Omnichord, keyboards (6)
- Jessica Winter – lead vocals, strings, synthesizer, bass synthesizer (9)
- Alex Greaves – engineering (1–6, 8)
- Peter Ferguson – engineering (9)
- The Rainlord – artwork, concept
- Gareth Mallinson – layout
- Stanley Chow – specialist additional 'fig' photography

== Charts ==
Chart performance for No Rocket Required
Chart (2025)	Peak position
Scottish Albums (OCC)	39
UK Independent Albums (OCC)	13
