= Endure =

Endure may refer to:

- Endure (Assemblage 23 album)
- Endure (Special Interest album)
- "Endure", a song by Nonpoint from the album Statement
