= The Cyclist Conspiracy =

- Origin: Serbia
- Genres: Psychedelic rock, World Music, Neofolk
- Years active: 2013 – present
- Label: Subsound records
- Members: Nikola Urošević; Miloš Vukčević; Uroš Kiš; Damjan Brkić; Dragana Fidanov; Jelena Velimirović; Marija Drezgić; Rajna Vuletić; Svetlana Spajić; Miloš Miljković
- Past members: Stefan Stepić; Katarina Brčarević; Dragan Mirković; Teodora Jelena Stošić; Jovana Lukić; Marija Lončar; Milana Vučićević; Una Isailović
- Website: www.thecyclistconspiracy.bandcamp.com

The Cyclist Conspiracy is a Serbian psychedelic rock band formed in Belgrade by Nikola Urošević, who is the author of most of their compositions and the only constant member since the band's formation in 2013. Their music is rooted in psychedelic and desert rock, but is influenced by a variety of cultures and genres, ranging from Greek traditional Rebetiko to Desert blues. Although featuring an all female choir of up to 7 vocalists, their original compositions are almost exclusively instrumental. So far the only songs featuring lyrics are covers of Greek traditionals. The band was named after the English translation of Svetislav Basara's book Fama o Biciklistima.

== History ==
In 2013 Nikola Urošević was actively playing in a Belgrade-based Lithuanian band BICIKL. BICIKL played completely improvised music, while Urošević also wanted to express his ideas in a more structured and composed environment. After several members of BICIKL left Serbia again, including the founding member Vyraš Karunos, the band went on hiatus and Urošević decided to form The Cyclist Conspiracy, choosing Basara's book title as a nod to his previous band.

With an all female choir as their lead vocalists they numbered more than ten musicians, which provided them with a powerful on-stage presence and a rich sound, but also proved hard to manage and led to many lineup changes. In 2015 they self-released A Night At Café "Constantinople" through their Bandcamp page. The EP consisted of 4 covers of Greek Rebetiko songs, with a faux-live recording in a non-existing tavern "Constantinople".

A year later their second EP was released under the name Mashallah Plan: Virility. It was published digitally by London-based Trashmouth Records, founded by May brothers of Decius. They were perfecting their sound through numerous gigs in Belgrade rock clubs, and in August 2016 in Dom Omladine, they were the opening act for King Dude, an American Neofolk musician.

In 2019, their third digitally released EP, El Beso De La Muerte, was published by Inverted Spectrum Records, Belgrade-Budapest based label run by Işık Sarıhan, the drummer of Turkish psychedelic rock band Hayvanlar Alemi.

In 2020 they self released their fourth EP, Giftopoula, featuring only one track (again a Rebetiko cover) and four remixes of it. The remixes were provided by Belgrade electronic musicians, Lenhart Tapes, mangulicaFM, Kӣr and Gianni Druid. The vocals for this track were not recorded with the choir, but provided solo by Svetlana Spajić.

Late 2023 saw the release of their first physical release. Long play vinyl Mashallah Plan was released by the Rome based independent label Subsound Records. The record featured new recordings of several songs already released on the Virility EP, as well as some never released material. It received positive reviews in local and international music blogs and portals.

The band has been active in concert, playing most of the alternative rock clubs around Serbia, and occasionally also in the region, such as the concert in Močvara, Zagreb, where they played with the Cypriot psychedelic rock band Buzz' Ayaz in October 2024.

== Discography ==
=== Studio albums ===
- Mashallah Plan (2023)
- Back to Hermetics and Martial Arts Vol. 1 (2025)

=== Extended plays ===
- A Night At Café "Constantinople" (feat. Kyria Katerina) (2015)
- Mashallah Plan: Virility (2016)
- El Beso De La Muerte (2019)
- Giftopoula (2020)
