= At the Hotspot =

Studio album by Warmduscher
- Released: 1 April 2022
- Length: 36:52
- Label: Bella Union
- Producer: Al Doyle; Joe Goddard

Warmduscher chronology
Tainted Lunch (2019)	At the Hotspot (2022)	Too Cold to Hold (2024)

Singles from At the Hotspot
- 1. "Wild Flowers" Released: October 2021

At the Hotspot is the fourth studio album by British band Warmduscher. It was released on 1 April 2022 through Bella Union. Production was handled by Al Doyle and Joe Goddard. The album peaked at number 20 on the Scottish Albums chart.

== Critical reception ==
Professional ratings
Aggregate scores
Source	Rating
Metacritic	70/100
Review scores
Source	Rating
DIY	4/5 stars
Dork	4/5
Gigwise	9/10 stars
Mojo	3/5 stars
musicOMH	4/5 stars
NME	3/5 stars
The Line of Best Fit	7/10
The Skinny	4/5 stars
Uncut	7/10

At the Hotspot was met with generally favourable reviews from music critics. At Metacritic, which assigns a normalized rating out of 100 to reviews from mainstream publications, the album received an average score of 70, based on six reviews.

Joe Goggins of DIY praised the album, saying "at the heart of At the Hotspot, though, is a reminder that for all of their eccentricities, Warmduscher remain a tight garage-rock outfit - just one that isn't afraid to wander down some stylistic rabbit holes". John Murphy of musicOMH stated: "the Hospot may be a fictional place, but Warmduscher have created the kind of soundtrack that makes it feel like the kind of place we'd all want to hang out in". Lewis Wade of The Skinny wrote: "the madcap experience of Warmduscher is still probably best on the stage, but this album goes some way to proving that given a little time to let their ideas gestate, they can actually produce something that sounds good on the stereo, as well as the back room of a pub". John Robinson of Uncut resumed: "occasionally it can feel like you're listening to in-jokes playing on repeat, but good tunes like "Eight Minute Machines" (Sleaford Mods, 1978) and "Twitchin’ In The Kitchen" ("It's Tricky" repurposed for drug users) emerge from the funky environs with characterful fuzz intact".

In mixed reviews, Andrew Perry of Mojo noted that the producers "bring a fitting smoothness to the cheesy exotica groove of "Wild Flowers", and a swinging clarity to "Fatso"'s '80s P-Funk electro-grind", and concluded: "elsewhere, At The Hotspot can be too hectic for wider recommendation". Rhys Buchanan of New Musical Express wrote: "the freewheeling spirit does occasionally give way to a less exciting middle ground: "Eight Minute Machines" comes as a blast of scuzzy guitar-driven punk we've heard a lot of in recent years, where the six-minute closer "Greasin' Up Jesus" is built around a drum machine doesn't go anywhere in particular. For the most part, though, this is clearly the sound of a band ready to party once more, making for another carnival of different sounds and offbeat ideas".

== Track listing ==
No.	Title	Writer(s)	Length
1.	"Live at the Hotspot"	Adam J. Harmer; Craig Higgins; Marley Mackey; Benjamin Romans-Hopcraft	4:36
2.	"Hot Shot"	Harmer; Higgins; Mackey; Romans-Hopcraft; Quinn Whalley	2:26
3.	"8 Minute Machine"	Harmer; Higgins; Mackey; Romans-Hopcraft; Whalley	2:26
4.	"Wild Flowers"	Harmer; Higgins; Mackey; Romans-Hopcraft; Whalley	3:34
5.	"Fatso"	Harmer; Higgins; Mackey; Romans-Hopcraft; Whalley	3:30
6.	"Twitchin' in the Kitchen"	Harmer; Higgins; Mackey; Romans-Hopcraft	3:35
7.	"Five Star Rated"	Harmer; Higgins; Mackey; Romans-Hopcraft; Whalley	2:06
8.	"Baby Toe Joe"	Harmer; Higgins; Mackey; Romans-Hopcraft; Whalley	3:39
9.	"Double Vision"	Harmer; Higgins; Mackey; Romans-Hopcraft; Whalley	1:28
10.	"Super Cool"	Harmer; Higgins; Mackey; Romans-Hopcraft; Whalley	3:20
11.	"Greasin' Up Jesus"	Harmer; Higgins; Mackey; Romans-Hopcraft; Whalley	6:12
Total length:			36:52

== Personnel ==
- Craig "Clams Baker Jr." Higgins – vocals
- Adam "Quicksand" Harmer – guitar
- Kid Whispers – keyboards
- Ben "Mr. Salt Fingers Lovecraft" Romans-Hopcraft – bass
- Bleu Ottis – drums
- Quinn "The Witherer" Whalley – percussion
- Sofia Sarina – backing vocals (tracks: 4, 6, 7, 8, 10, 11)
- Kitty Whalley – backing vocals (tracks: 6, 7)
- Josh Caffe – backing vocals (track 10)
- Alexander Doyle – additional keyboards (tracks: 1, 4, 6, 9, 11), additional percussion (track 3), steel drums & percussion (track 10), producer
- Victor Jakeman – additional keyboards (tracks: 4, 8)
- Igor Cavalera – percussion (track 6)
- Joe Goddard – producer
- Luke Jarvis – artwork
- Benjamin Dyer – logo artwork, illustration

== Charts ==
Chart (2022)	Peak position
Scottish Albums (OCC)	20
UK Album Downloads (OCC)	16
UK Independent Albums (OCC)	5
