= Special Interest (band) =

Punk band

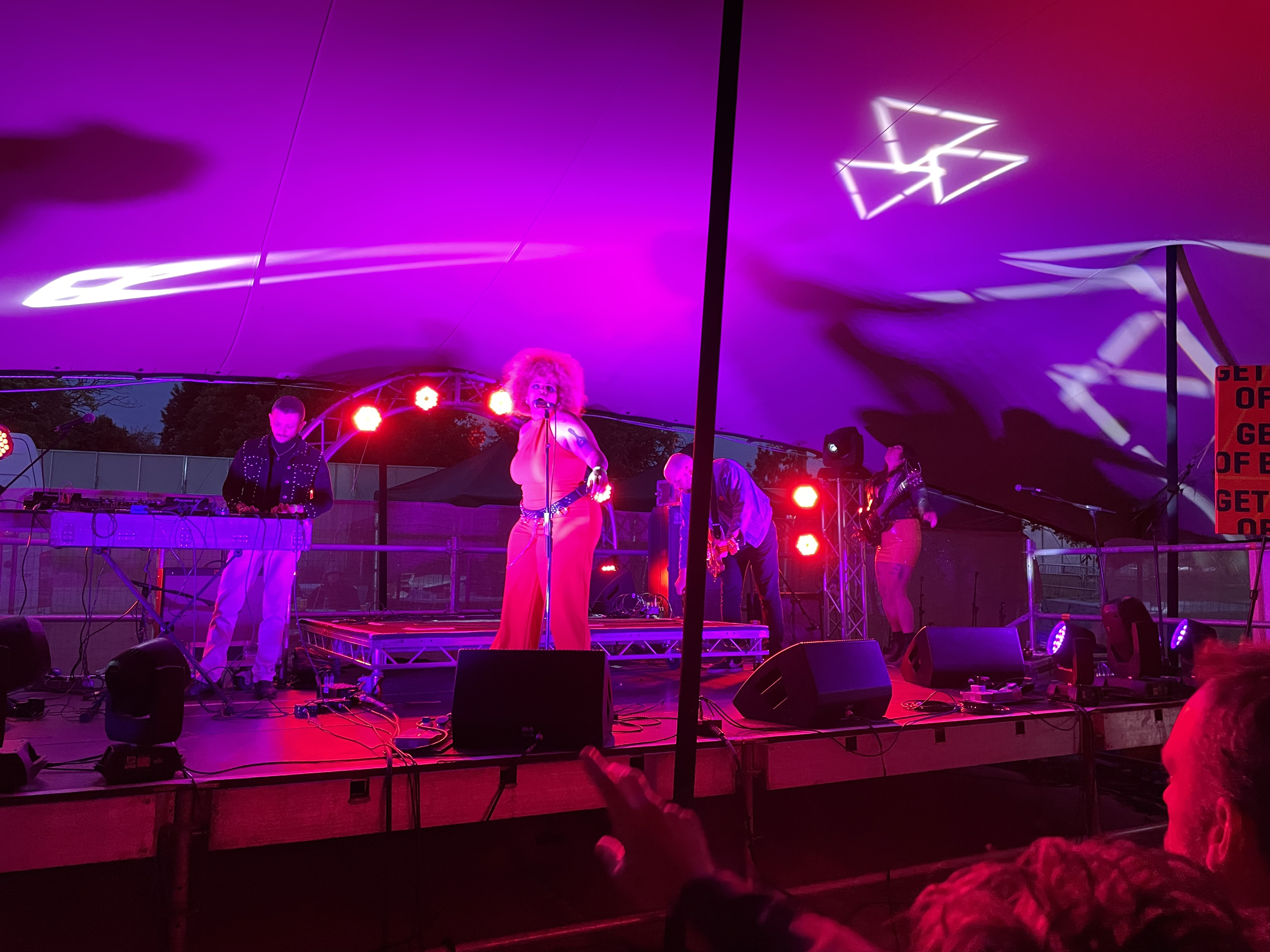
- Special Interest at Wide Awake 2022

Background information
- Origin: New Orleans, Louisiana
- Genres: Dance-punk; Noise rock; No wave; Synth punk; Industrial rock
- Years active: 2016–present
- Labels: Thrilling Living; Night School; Rough Trade Records; Nude Club Records
- Members: Alli Logout; Maria Elena; Nathan Cassiani; Ruth Mascelli

Special Interest is a punk band from New Orleans, Louisiana that consists of Alli Logout on vocals, Maria Elena on guitar, Nathan Cassiani on bass, and Ruth Mascelli on synthesizer and drum machine. In interviews, they have described themselves as "genre non-conforming", drawing inspiration from various kinds of music, such as noise rock, no wave, dance-punk, and industrial rock; critics have described their music as mixing pop, disco, house, and glam punk. The band has grown a cult following and is notorious for its high-intensity live performances.

They have released three full-length albums, an album of demos, and one remix album on independent labels. In 2021 they announced they have signed to Rough Trade Records.

Their third album, Endure, received significant critical notice, including a "Best New Music" review from Pitchfork, "Album of the Week" designation from BrooklynVegan, and four stars from The Guardian. It received a Metacritic score of 84, indicating "universal acclaim".

== Discography ==
=== Albums ===
- Spiraling - Raw Sugar Records (USA) / Anxious Music (UK), 12" LP, MP3 (2018)
- The Passion Of - Thrilling Living (USA) / Night School (UK), 12" LP, MP3 (2020)
- Endure - Rough Trade Records, 12" LP, MP3 (2022)

=== Compilations ===
- Trust No Wave: The 2016 Demos - Disciples (UK), 12" LP, MP3 (2021)

=== Remix albums ===
- The Passion Of: Remixed - Nude Club Records, 12" LP, MP3 (2021)
- Endure (Remixed) - Rough Trade Records, MP3 (2023)

=== Singles ===
- "Street Pulse Beat" - Nude Club Records, 12" Single, MP3 (2021)
- "Disco 1.5" - Rough Trade Records, MP3 (2023)
