= Luvcat =

English singer and songwriter (born 1996)

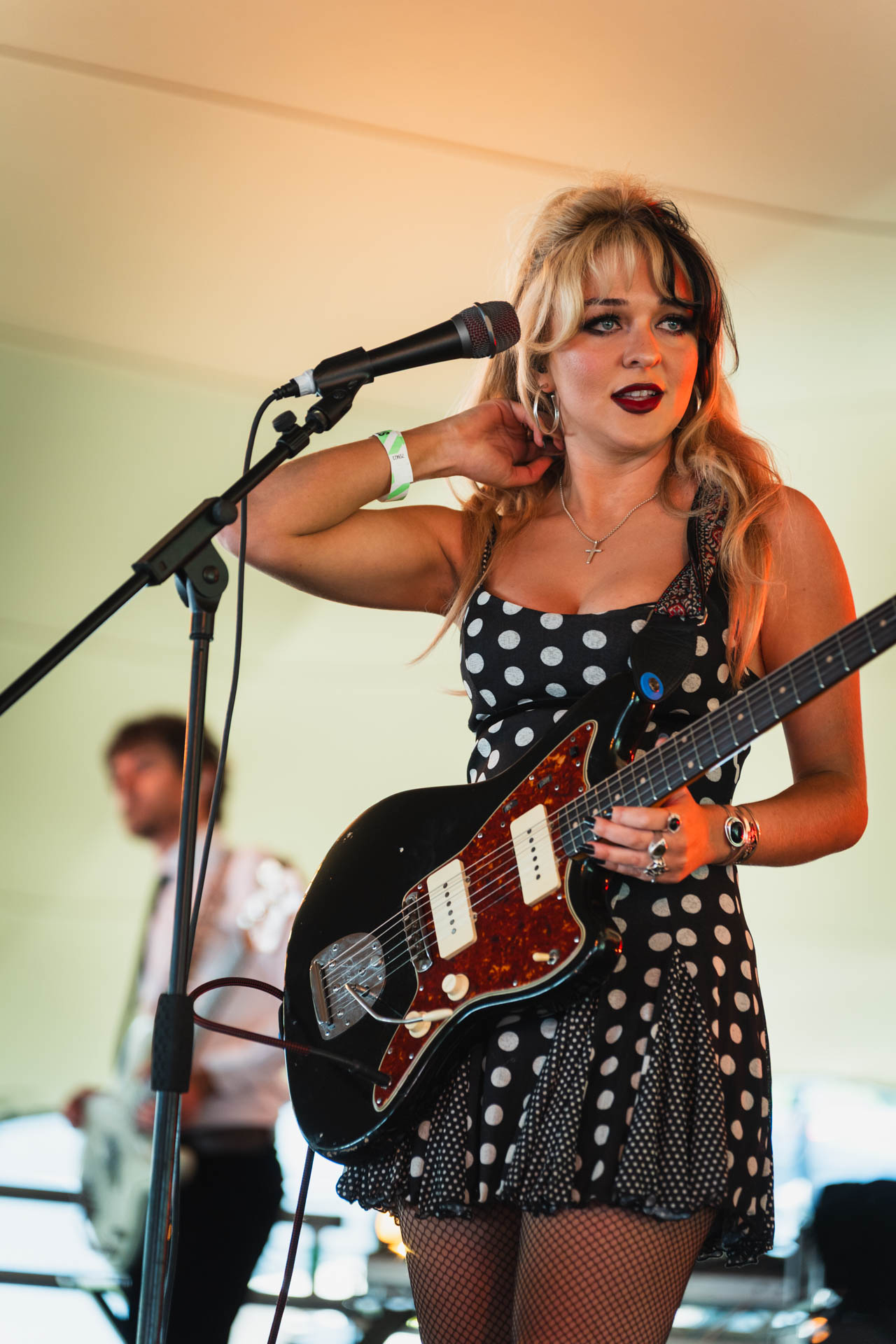
- Morgan performing as Luvcat at Wide Awake 2025

Background information
- Born: Sophie Morgan Howarth; 20 December 1996 (age 29); Liverpool, England
- Genres: Alternative rock; dark pop; gothic/noir; alternative folk
- Instruments: Vocals; piano; guitar
- Years active: 2013–present

Sophie Morgan Howarth (born 1996), also known as Luvcat, is an English singer-songwriter. After gaining initial prominence as an acoustic artist under the name Sophie Morgan through three EPs, she formed Luvcat in 2023. Luvcat's debut album Vicious Delicious was released on 31 October 2025.

== Biography ==
Born in Liverpool, Sophie Morgan Howarth was raised in Rainhill and Widnes, Cheshire in North West England. She attended Tower College.

=== 2013–2021: Beginnings as Sophie Morgan ===
After a chance meeting with the Verve's Simon Jones, whilst singing in church at a friend's wedding, Morgan began skipping private school and recording in Jones' Chester studio, first appearing in the media in 2013 around age 16. She performed at the Warrington Music Festival that year. In addition to singing, she called piano her "main instrument" and also played guitar.

Morgan released her first single "Marionette" in 2016, followed six months later by "Quietly", which picked up support from BBC Music Introducing and BBC 6 Music along the way. Morgan's debut EP Annie was released on 6 October 2017. After applying for the rights to record a version of "The Whole of the Moon", which features on the EP, Morgan was invited on tour with the Waterboys across the UK and Europe through the autumn of 2017.

Her second EP Sons & Daughters was released on 21 September 2018; its titular single "Sons & Daughters" received critical acclaim for the quality of her voice and simplicity of its delivery. In 2019, she covered the National's "Bloodbuzz Ohio" and performed at Warrington Music Festival. She released her third and final EP as Sophie Morgan in March 2020 titled Marmalade.

=== 2023–present: Luvcat ===
In 2023, Morgan formed her alternative rock/dark pop project and alter ego called Luvcat, named after "The Love Cats" by the Cure, debuting with the single "Matador" in 2024. She also put together a band with Jack Fussey, Andy Richmond, Tom Fripp and Will Jaquet. They had their first headline show at Paper Dress Vintage in July, performed at All Points East, and supported the Last Dinner Party and Paris Paloma on tour. Luvcat's next singles "He's My Man", described as a murder ballad, and "Dinner @ Brasserie Zédel" were released in autumn. Before its release, excerpts of "He's My Man" went viral on TikTok, where users paired the song with romantic videos before discovering that its full lyrics told a murder-ballad narrative.

The single "Love & Money" was released on Valentine's Day 2025 followed by "Lipstick" in May and the announcement of Luvcat's debut album Vicious Delicious for a Halloween release date, accompanied by the titular single in the summer. Luvcat supported Sabrina Carpenter at BST Hyde Park, is headlining the Montreux Jazz Festival, and has an upcoming headline tour.

== Artistry ==
Morgan has cited the music she heard growing up as a formative influence. Her grandfather introduced her to Frank Sinatra, the Rat Pack and musical theatre, while her father introduced her to the Cure, the Velvet Underground, Leonard Cohen and Tom Waits. Her earlier work as Sophie Morgan was primarily acoustic and folk-influenced, a style she later described as more serious and intimate than her music as Luvcat. Her other early musical influences included Nick Drake, Van Morrison, Joni Mitchell and Carole King. She has also cited the Cure's music video for "Lullaby" and the theatrical presentation of My Chemical Romance's The Black Parade as influences on her interest in gothic imagery and performance.

As Luvcat, Morgan developed a more theatrical musical style incorporating alternative rock, dark pop, jazz and cabaret influences. She has identified Waits's use of unconventional sounds and dark humour as important influences on the project's musical direction. Her songwriting combines personal experiences with fictional characters and narratives, frequently exploring obsessive or destructive relationships, romantic fantasy and violence. She has described recurring characters appearing across different songs and identified Liverpool, London and Paris as important settings and influences in the writing of Vicious Delicious.

Luvcat's visual presentation incorporates gothic imagery, old Hollywood glamour and elaborate stage costumes, with live performances featuring candelabras and wine bottles covered in dripping candle wax. Morgan has also incorporated stories about being born on a Parisian riverboat and running away with a circus into the Luvcat persona's backstory. She explained that she wanted to preserve a sense of mystery by blurring the distinction between fact and fiction in her public biography. She has described her theatrical makeup and stage presentation as reflecting the flamboyant fashion associated with her Liverpool upbringing.

== Sophie Morgan discography ==
=== EPs ===
- Annie (2017)
- Sons & Daughters (2018)
- Marmalade (2020)

=== Singles ===
- "Marionette" (2016)
- "Sons & Daughters" (2018)
- "Above You" (2018)
- "Marmalade" (2020)
- "Bar to Bar" (2020)
- "If You Knew" (2020)
- "Unwinnable War" (2020)
- "Always" (2021)

== Luvcat discography ==
=== Albums ===
- Vicious Delicious (2025)

=== EP ===
- Lovebites (2026)

=== Singles ===
- "Matador" (2024)
- "He's My Man" (2024)
- "Dinner @ Brasserie Zédel" (2024)
- "Love & Money" (2025)
- "Lipstick" (2025)
- "Matador - Strings" (2025)
- "Vicious Delicious" (2025)
- "Blushing"(2025)
- "He’s My Man (The Anniversary)" feat. John Cooper Clarke (2025)
- "Vampire at the Beach" (2026)
