= Los Bitchos =

Latin music band

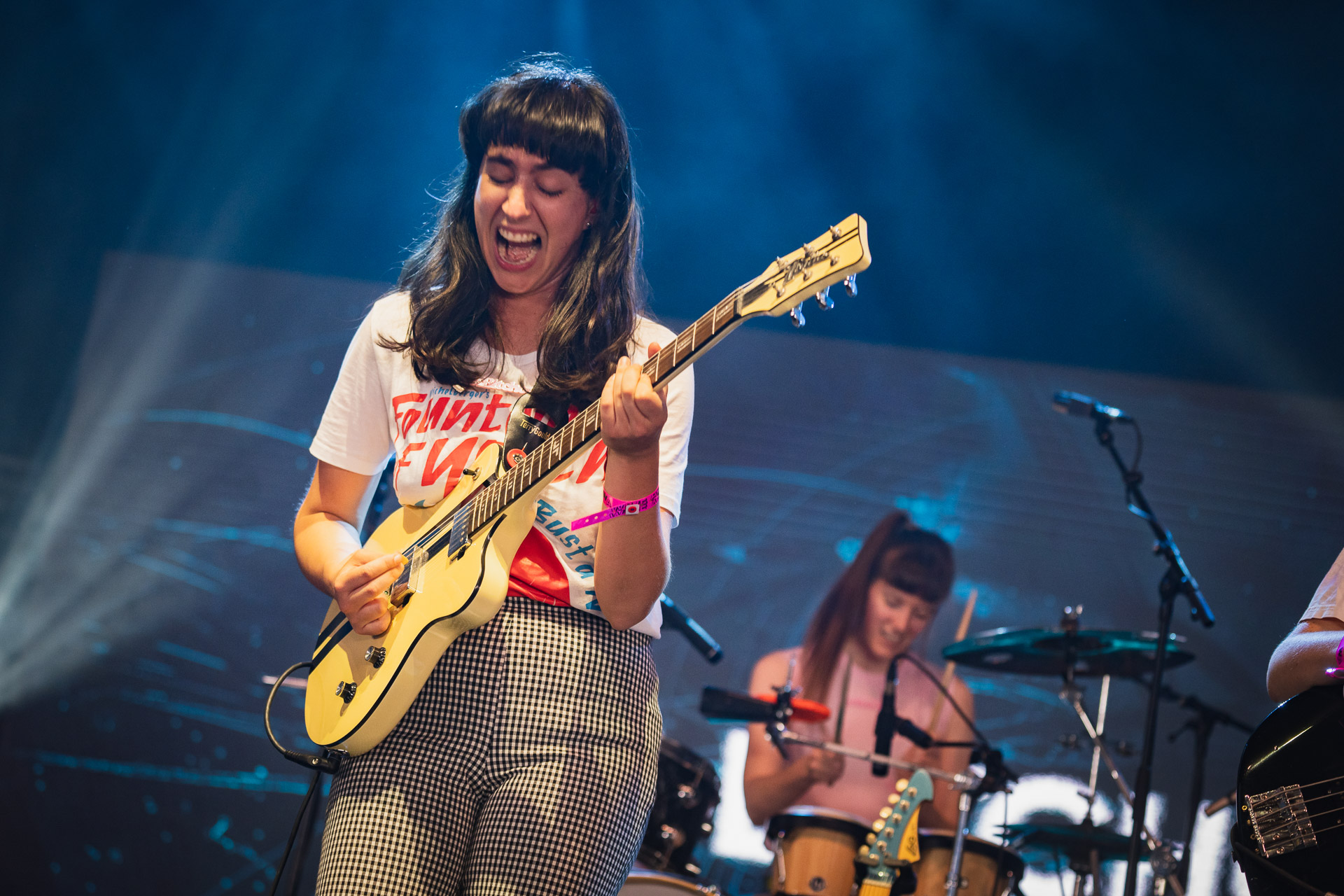
- Los Bitchos performing at the Wide Awake Festival in 2021

Background information
- Origin: London, England
- Genres: Cumbia; Latin music
- Years active: 2017–present
- Labels: City Slang; Blak Hand; Strong Island Recordings; Bad Vibrations
- Members: Serra Petale; Josefine Jonsson; Nic Crawshaw
- Past members: Carolina Faruolo: Agustina Ruiz
- Website: losbitchos.com

Los Bitchos is a pan-continental band based in London, England. The band consists of Western Australian-born Serra Petale (guitar), Swede Josefine Jonsson (bass guitar), and South London-born Nic Crawshaw (drums, percussion). They predominantly play instrumental music in the style of cumbia from the 1970s and 1980s.

== Career and sound ==
Los Bitchos was formed in London in 2017. Describing the band's sound, guitarist Serra Petale said "I wanted to sound like Van Halen and Cocteau Twins – but from Turkey", with the band also crediting influences from Petale's mother's 1970s Anatolian rock records, keyboardist Agustina Ruiz's Latin-American music collection, Madonna's "La Isla Bonita" period, "out of control pop" from Jonsson, and punk thanks to Crawshaw's time drumming in various punk bands.

The band went on to early releases with labels Blak Hand Records, Strong Island Recordings and Bad Vibrations.

In 2019, Franz Ferdinand frontman Alex Kapranos produced their sold-out debut 7" single "Pista (Fresh Start)", described as sounding like "William Onyeabor discovering cumbia".

The band's debut KEXP session, filmed at Trans Musicales Festival, was released on 7 March 2020. During the COVID lockdowns that followed shortly afterwards, the video gained traction on YouTube, attracting worldwide attention and amassing over 2 million views. This was followed by a self-released seven-inch "The Link Is About to Die" in 2020.

In July 2021, Los Bitchos featured on the track "Erkilet Güzeli" by Turkish band Altın Gün. Later that year, the band signed a publishing deal with Reservoir Media.

They reunited with Alex Kapranos to record their debut album Let the Festivities Begin!, which was released by City Slang in February 2022 alongside a European headline tour. Talking of the collaboration, Jonsson said: "We asked him to produce us again, and he brought out the best in us in a really encouraging way," with Petale adding: "He used a lot of his vintage gear, including some cosmic synths that give our songs a bit of added sass".

They released their debut studio album Let the Festivities Begin! in February 2022, with the songs "Good to Go!", "Las Panteras" and "Pista (Fresh Start)" released as singles beforehand. Following the release of their debut record, the band received critical acclaim from the likes of BBC 6 Music, KEXP, Rolling Stone, NME and various other media outlets.

The band made their TV debut at the Park Stage at Glastonbury in June 2023 as part of the BBC's coverage of the festival. In June 2024 the band performed live on France's ARTE TV show Ground Control.

The band's second album Talkie Talkie was released on 30 August 2024, again via City Slang Records. It was preceded by the singles "La Bomba", "Don't Change", "1K!" and "Kiki, You Complete Me".

Los Bitchos' third album, Los Bitchos & Friends Vol 1, was released on 13 November 2026. It is the band's first album to feature guest performers as well as songs with traditional lyrics.

== Live career ==
Los Bitchos' debut show was supporting The Parrots, at Oslo Hackney on May 10, 2017.

Los Bitchos completed a European tour with Mac DeMarco in 2019 and supported acts like Ty Segall and Kikagaku Moyo in London.

A number of high-profile festival sets raised the profile of the band across Europe and North America. The band played sets to huge crowds at Coachella, SXSW, Glastonbury, Rock En Seine, End of The Road, Levitation and Wide Awake Festival. A sold-out tour of the UK followed the album's release.

In 2022, the band joined Belle & Sebastian on a US tour, as well as joining King Gizzard & The Lizard Wizard on a European tour in 2023.

They have also supported the likes of Pavement, Franz Ferdinand and Parquet Courts.

== Discography ==
Studio albums

- Let the Festivities Begin! (2022)
- Talkie Talkie (2024)
- Los Bitchos & Friends Vol 1 (2026)
