= Forgiveness Is Yours =

Studio album by Fat White Family
- Released: 26 April 2024
- Genre: Post-punk
- Length: 40:14
- Label: Domino

Fat White Family chronology
Serfs Up! (2019)	Forgiveness Is Yours (2024)

Singles from Forgiveness Is Yours
- 1. "Religion for One" Released: December 11, 2023; 2. "Bullet of Dignity" Released: January 24, 2024; 3. "What's that You Say" Released: March 25, 2024

Forgiveness Is Yours is the fourth studio album by the British post-punk band Fat White Family, released on 26 April 2024 by Domino. It is the band's first album without guitarist Saul Adamczewski.

== Critical reception ==
Professional ratings
Aggregate scores
Source	Rating
AnyDecentMusic?	6.7/10
Metacritic	71/100
Review scores
Source	Rating
Clash	8/10
NME	4/5 stars
Slant Magazine	4/5 stars
MusicOMH	3/5 stars
Under the Radar	6.5/10

Forgiveness Is Yours received positive reviews from music critics. On Metacritic, which assigns a normalized rating out of 100 to reviews from professional publications, the album received an average score of 71, based on seven reviews, indicating "generally favorable reviews".

At Slant Magazine, Steve Erickson stated that "Fat White Family may have dropped some of the more antagonistic aspects of their image and adopted a slightly slicker sound, but their anger is still very palpable. Music isn't worth performing, they seem to suggest, if it doesn't risk pissing people off, or at least challenging the listener's complacency. With Forgiveness Is Yours, Saoudi and company achieve that objective—with a patina of sophistication." In his review for NME, Jordan Bassett wrote about Fat White Family's artistic switch from music that was "more invested in offending their audience than crafting much of a tune" to music that he states is more respectable and "burrows down the rabbit-hole of respectability".

== Track listing ==
Forgiveness Is Yours track listing
No.	Title	Length
1.	"The Archivist"	1:29
2.	"John Lennon"	3:53
3.	"Bullet of Dignity"	2:59
4.	"Polygamy Is Only for the Chief"	3:21
5.	"Visions of Pain"	3:46
6.	"Today You Become Man"	3:59
7.	"Religion for One"	3:19
8.	"Feed the Horse"	5:11
9.	"What's That You Say"	3:43
10.	"Work"	4:29
11.	"You Can't Force It"	4:03

== Charts ==
Chart performance for Forgiveness Is Yours
Chart (2024)	Peak position
Scottish Albums (OCC)	12
UK Albums (OCC)	61
UK Independent Albums (OCC)	4
