= Interplanetary Class Classics =

Studio album by The Moonlandingz
- Released: March 24, 2017
- Studio: Chimera Music Studios; (New York, NY)
- Genre: Experimental rock; glam rock; neo-psychedelia; punk rock
- Length: 41:30
- Label: Chimera; Transgressive Records
- Producer: The Moonlandingz; Sean Lennon

The Moonlandingz chronology
Black Hanz (2016)	Interplanetary Class Classics (2017)	No Rocket Required (2025)

Singles from Interplanetary Class Classics
- 1. "Black Hanz" Released: November 25, 2016; 2. "The Strangle of Anna" Released: February 2, 2017; 3. "The Rabies Are Back" Released: June 21, 2017

Interplanetary Class Classics is the debut studio album from Sheffield-based rock band The Moonlandingz. It was released on March 24, 2017, through Transgressive Records in Europe and by Chimera Music in the United States. It was produced by both the band and Sean Lennon, and was recorded at the Chimera Music Studio in New York. The album features guest vocals from Yoko Ono, Philip Oakey, Randy Jones and Slow Club frontwoman Rebecca Lucy Taylor.

== Background ==
Following their collaboration on Johnny Rocket, Narcissist & Music Machine...I'm Your Biggest Fan and the Moonlandingz EP, Eccentronic Research Council duo Adrian Flanagan and Dean Honer decided to continue their partnership with Fat White Family members Saul Adamczewski and Lias Kaci Saoudi by taking the Moonlandingz concept and turning into a fully-fledged live band. Throughout the first half of 2016, the band continued to tour and put out another EP on Transgressive Records, entitled Blak Hanz.

After the release of the EP, the partnership committed to creating a full album under the Moonlandingz name. To produce the album they enlisted Sean Lennon, who uprooted the band from Sheffield to record in his Chimera Music Studio in New York. Several notable musicians were brought on board to help create the album, including bassist/guitarist Mairead O'Connor and Add N to (X) drummer Ross Orton. Both musicians would continue their roles with the band on the subsequent tour supporting the album. Yoko Ono played a key role during the production, both co-writing and providing vocals for the song 'The Cities Undone'. The Human League frontman Philip Oakey also supplied backing vocals for the track, while former Village People singer Randy Jones provided vocals for the song 'Glory Hole'. Rebecca Taylor, lead singer of Slow Club, provided co-vocals on 'The Strangle of Anna'.

The album was announced on the 29 November 2016. The news accompanied the release of a video for the single 'Black Hanz', directed by Charlotte Kemp Muhl, and details regarding dates for the supporting tour. Under the guise of Johnny Rocket, singer Saoudi released a statement to coincide with the announcement, stating "It is with a great lack of humility that I would like to announce the release of the album of the epoch, a derogatory slap in the face of good taste and decency, an album synthesised out of pure irresponsibility and sheer self-adoration. Consider this album two great monoliths, one of misanthropy the other self-love, it is unyielding in its perfect duality. There shall be no such thing as pop music henceforth, for in the wake of this cultural Big Bang all other efforts in the medium will appear to be what they always truly have been: puddles of tepid consciousness."

Two further songs were released as singles from the album. The first, 'The Strangle of Anna', was released on February 2, 2017. In the announcement, band member Adrian Flanagan talked about the track, revealing, "It is written from the viewpoint of the girlfriend of some clichéd, self absorbed, pound-shop indie Lou Reed wannabe, who plays in some velvets / Mary chain-esque shoddy local band..You know the type, sociopathic skinny boys in leather jackets and winkle pickers, with cry baby, light weight, borderline drug problem - and with egos that far outweighs their talent for playing the chords, C, F and G through a fuzz guitar pedal, drenched in reverb."

Following the album's launch in March, the final single 'The Rabies Are Back' was released on June 21, 2017. According to a statement released by the band, the song was inspired by the political climate in the United Kingdom: "In these seemingly 1970's times of violent and hideous intolerance towards people of race, religion and culture, perpetuated by the over-zealous scaremongering of the right-wing press we wrote 'The Rabies are Back' from the perspective of these little booze cruise Englanders, those Union Jack short wearing, Euro lager drinking, chicken masala swilling, Lidl shopping, hard Brexit cheering, refugee baiting, balls of contradiction."

== Critical reception ==
Professional ratings
Aggregate scores
Source	Rating
Metacritic	85/100
Review scores
Source	Rating
AllMusic	4.5/5 stars
The Guardian	4/5 stars

Interplanetary Class Classics was positively received by contemporary music critics upon release. At Metacritic, which assigns a normalized rating out of 100 to reviews from mainstream publications, the album received an average score of 85, based on 10 reviews, indicating "universal acclaim".

In a four and a half star review for AllMusic, reviewer Tim Sendra wrote: "The Moonlandingz may have been a joke at first, a way for the guys at the ERC to have some fun and bring their concept album to life. Luckily for fans of ridiculous pop, they took it another step and made Interplanetary Class Classics, a wild work of twisted genius and more fun than rabies, that's for sure." Dave Simpson also applauded the band in his four-star review for The Guardian, saying "It’s an inspired mish-mash of Glitter Band tribal drumming, a howling wolf, tuneless saxophone squawking, heavy breathing and at least one narrative about castration; a sort of Cramps-meet-B-52s Hammer horror-rock monster." Praising the album in a review for The Quietus, Brian Coney claimed, "Interplanetary Class Classics is indeed an instant classic and a release that confirms The Moonlandingz as a fully-fledged proposition who are not only at least equal to the sum of the parts but also one whose clout beyond the stage offers a whole new realm of murky and majestic discovery."

=== Accolades ===
Publication	Accolade	Year	Rank	Ref.
Gigwise	Gigwise's 51 Best Albums of 2017	2017	13	
NME	NME's Albums of the Year 2017	2017	45	
The Quietus	The Quietus' Albums of the Year	2017	4	

== Track listing ==
All tracks are written by The Moonlandingz, except where noted.

No.	Title	Music	Length
1.	"Vessels"		3:30
2.	"Sweet Saturn Mine"		3:48
3.	"Black Hanz"		4:21
4.	"I.D.S"		3:47
5.	"The Strangle of Anna"		3:40
6.	"Theme for Valhalla Dale"	Saul Adamczewski, Adrian Flanagan, Dean Honer, Lias Kaci Saoudi, Sean Lennon	1:12
7.	"The Rabies Are Back"		3:11
8.	"Neuf du Pape"		2:49
9.	"Glory Hole"		4:02
10.	"Lufthansa Man"		4:59
11.	"This Cities Undone"	Adamczewski, Flanagan, Honer, Saoudi, Yoko Ono	6:11

== Personnel ==
The Moonlandingz

- Saul Adamczewski – guitar
- Adrian Flanagan – keyboards, vocals, bass, producer
- Dean Honer – keyboards, producer
- Lias Kaci Saoudi – vocals

Additional Musicians

- Randy Jones – vocals
- Sean Lennon – guitar, producer
- Mairead O'Connor – bass, guitar
- Phillip Oakey – vocals
- Yoko Ono – vocals
- Ross Orton – drums, percussion
- Rebecca Taylor – vocals
