= Champagne Holocaust =

Studio album by Fat White Family
- Released: 1 April 2013
- Genre: Rock; pop
- Length: 38:56
- Label: Fat Possum; Trashmouth
- Producer: Fat White Family; Liam May

Fat White Family chronology
Champagne Holocaust (2013)	Songs for Our Mothers (2016)

Deluxe edition cover

Champagne Holocaust is the debut studio album by English rock band, Fat White Family, released on April 1, 2013, by Trashmouth Records. A deluxe edition of the album, featuring ten extra tracks was released on September 14, 2014 by Fat Possum Records.

== Critical reception ==
Professional ratings
Review scores
Source	Rating
Pitchfork	6.6/10
AllMusic	3/5 stars
NME	3.5/5 stars

Champagne Holocaust was met with mixed but generally positive reviews from critics.

Nick Neyland of Pitchfork said, "It’s unlikely that Champagne Holocaust will be the album Fat White Family is best remembered for—this is the shambolic beginnings of something, full of directions tried and discarded and barely fleshed out." Mark Deming of AllMusic said, "Champagne Holocaust sounds like the work of foul-mouthed, ill-tempered drunks, but that's also clearly what they had in mind, and in its own way this album is an off-putting success -- it's hardly everyone's cup of tea, but the Fat White Family wanted nothing less."

Kate Lloyd of NME said, "The record is undoubtedly an antidote to the creeping conservatism in rock, typified by that photo of Haim with David Cameron. But it’s also music that’s constantly on the brink of collapsing under the weight of its own politics, poverty and vicious intent."

== Track listing ==
=== Original album ===
Champagne Holocaust – Standard edition track listing
No.	Title	Length
1.	"Auto Neutron"	4:56
2.	"Is It Raining in Your Mouth?"	3:52
3.	"Who Shot Lee Oswald?"	3:05
4.	"Without Consent"	4:04
5.	"Special Ape"	1:25
6.	"Cream of the Young"	4:08
7.	"Wild American Prairie"	3:34
8.	"Borderline"	3:26
9.	"Heaven On Earth"	3:04
10.	"Bomb Disneyland"	3:44
11.	"Garden of the Numb"	3:36
Total length:		38:56

=== Deluxe Edition ===
Champagne Holocaust (Deluxe Edition) bonus tracks
No.	Title	Length
12.	"Wet Hot Beef, Pt. I"	7:05
13.	"Wet Hot Beef, Pt. II"	1:51
14.	"Now That I'm Taking Myself Seriously As an Artist (Wet Hot Beef, Pt. III)"	1:32
15.	"Lend Me Some Cutter"	1:15
16.	"Borderline - Demo Version"	2:16
17.	"These Hands - Demo Versions"	2:44
18.	"Nagasaki Dust"	4:14
19.	"Bomb Disneyland - Live At The Shacklewell"	4:32
20.	"Mau!"	3:21
21.	"Cream of the Young - Medicine 8 remix"	5:56
Total length:		73:42

== Charts ==
Chart performance for Champagne Holocaust
Chart (2020)	Peak position
Scottish Albums (OCC)	40
UK Independent Albums (OCC)	6
