= Endure (Special Interest album) =

Studio album by Special Interest
- Released: November 4, 2022
- Recorded: 2020–2022
- Studio: HighTower, New Orleans
- Length: 43:55
- Label: Rough Trade
- Producer: Special Interest

Special Interest chronology
The Passion Of (2020)	Endure (2022)

Endure is the third studio album by the New Orleans punk band Special Interest, released in 2022.

== Critical reception ==
Professional ratings
Aggregate scores
Source	Rating
Metacritic	84/100
Review scores
Source	Rating
The Guardian	4/5 stars
Loud and Quiet	9/10
Pitchfork	8.8/10

Endure was released to rave reviews from critics. On the review aggregate site Metacritic, the album has a score of 84 out of 100. It received significant critical notice, including a "Best New Music" review from Pitchfork, "Album of the Week" designation from BrooklynVegan, and four stars from The Guardian.

== Track listing ==
Endure track listing
No.	Title	Length
1.	"Cherry Blue Intention"	3:23
2.	"(Herman's) House"	4:07
3.	"Foul"	2:47
4.	"Midnight Legend" (featuring Mykki Blanco)	3:25
5.	"Love Scene"	4:43
6.	"Kurdish Radio"	2:51
7.	"My Displeasure"	5:23
8.	"Impulse Control"	3:03
9.	"Concerning Peace"	4:31
10.	"Interlude"	1:45
11.	"LA Blues"	8:00
Total length:		43:55
