= Decius (band) =

British band (2014-present)

- Origin: London, United Kingdom
- Genres: Electronic music, Disco, Acid house
- Years active: 2014–present
- Labels: The Leaf Label, Decius Trax
- Website: http://www.deciustrax.com/

Decius are a London-based band made up of brothers Liam and Luke May (founders of Trashmouth Records) together with Quinn Whalley (Paranoid London/Warmduscher) and Fat White Family frontman Lias Saoudi. They are signed to The Leaf Label and make music that draws on acid house, disco and techno.

== Background ==
After years spent performing at various London venues as Medicine 8, brothers Liam and Luke May began to perform in New York where they met Clams Baker (later to form Warmduscher but then working for house label Strictly Rhythm. In 2012 they formed the London-based Trashmouth Records. The label was an integral part of the scene built around The Windmill pub in Brixton, and released Fat White Family's Champagne Holocaust in 2014. The May brothers also went on to produce their albums Songs for Our Mothers and Serfs Up! as well as Warmduscher's Khaki Tears.

Liam May has stated that "seeing Fat White Family the first time gave me that acid house buzz, even though they weren't making dance music by any stretch. Then, as an ongoing thing, we just keep looking out for that feeling. We all go back a long way, making music and being around stuff going on, so we all know what that feeling is, and if it's there or not." The May brothers and Quinn Whalley were regularly performing at The Windmill under various guises whilst working with Fat White Family and Luke May has said that "at a certain point, that I’m sure no-one remembers, Decius just seemed like the right thing to do.”

== Career ==
In 2014 Decius released their first single "Come To Me Villa" on More About Music, the label of Paranoid London's manager Mark Potts. It was not a commercial success but caught the attention of numerous DJs including Jacob Meehan, Derek Plaslaiko, Mike Servito and Carlos Souffront and Dark Entries boss Josh Cheon. The band went on to release 2015's Bread & Butter EP and 2016's Rupture Boutique EP with More About Music, and released Masculine Encounter and Paradise / Duuh-Dup on their label Decius Trax in 2017 and 2019 respectively.

In November 2022 Decius released their debut full-length album Decius Vol. I on The Leaf Label. Juno described the album as a "glorious combination of roughneck acid house and vocals on the edge of hysteria" and The Quietus praised its "sleazy wrongness". The album was placed at number five in The Quietus Albums Of The Year 2022, number two in the Juno Daily Best of 2022 and number three in Music OMH's Top 50 Albums Of 2022.

== Discography ==
=== Albums ===
- Decius Vol. I (The Leaf Label, 2022)
- Decius Vol. II (Splendour & Obedience) (The Leaf Label, 2024)

=== Singles and EPs ===
- Come To Me Villa (More About Music, 2014)
- Bread & Butter EP (More About Music, 2015)
- Rupture Boutique EP (More About Music, 2016)
- Masculine Encounter (Decius Trax, 2017)
- Paradise / Duuh-Dup (Decius Trax, 2019)
- Masculine Encounter II EP (The Leaf Label, 2021)
- U-Instead Of Thought EP (The Leaf Label, 2021)
- Macbeth EP (The Leaf Label, 2021)
- Look Like A Man EP (The Leaf Label, 2022)
- Show Me No Tears (The Leaf Label, 2022)
- Roberto's Tumescence (The Leaf Label, 2023)
- Decius Trax I EP (Decius Trax, 2023)
- Decius Trax II EP (Decius Trax, 2023)
- Decius Trax III EP (Decius Trax, 2023)
