= Fat White Family =

English rock band

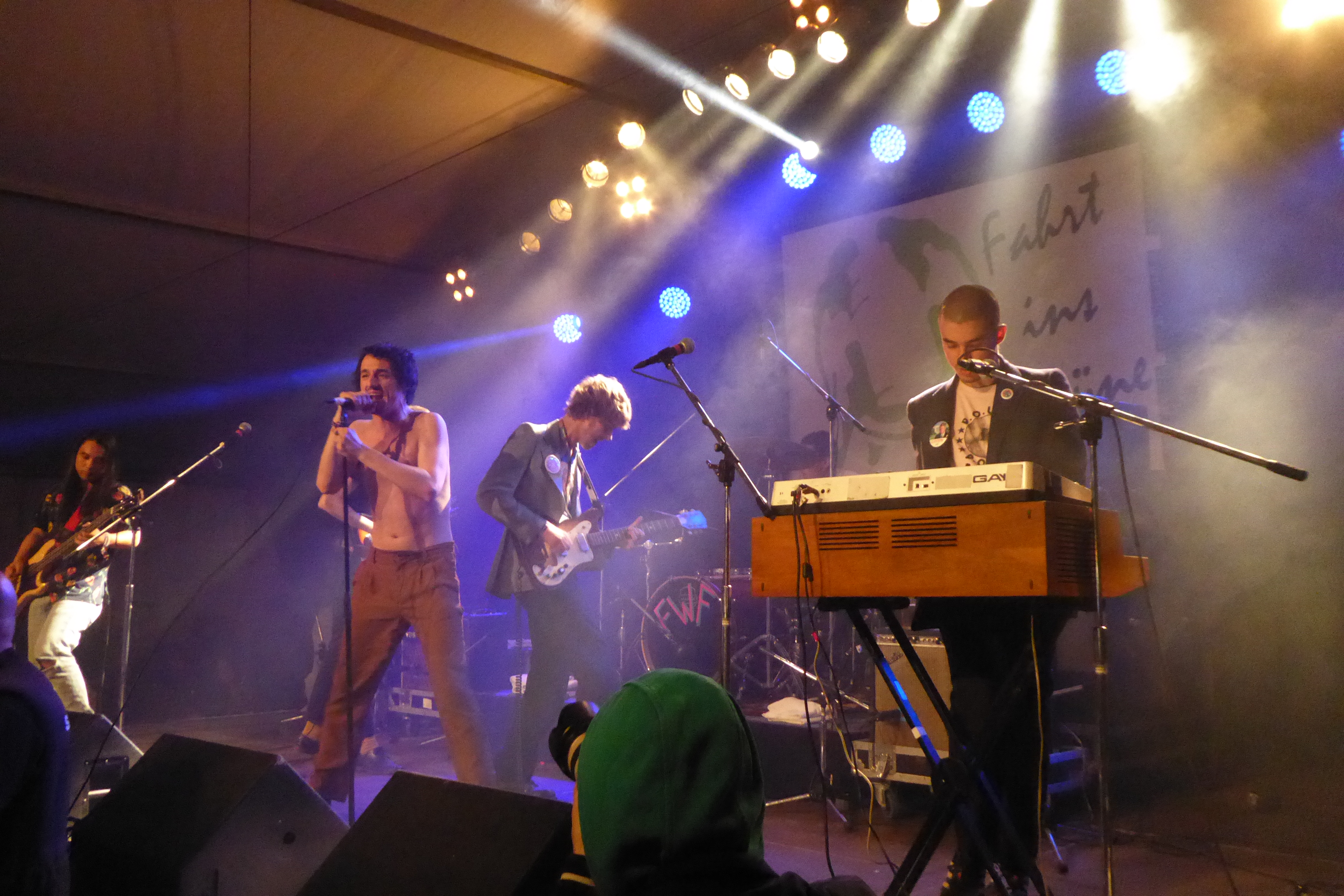
- Fat White Family at Immergut Festival 2016

Background information
- Origin: Peckham, South London, England
- Genres: Post-punk; experimental rock; garage rock; psychedelic rock
- Years active: 2011–present
- Labels: Domino; Trashmouth; Fat Possum; Hate Hate Hate; Without Consent
- Members: Lias Kaci Saoudi; Nathan Saoudi; Adam J Harmer; Adam Brennan; Alex White; Guilherme Fells; Victor Jakeman
- Past members: Ciaran Hartnett; Jack Everett; Joseph Pancucci-Simpson; Dan Lyons; Jak Payne; Taishi Nagasaka; Severin Black; Samuel Toms; Saul Adamczewski
- Website: fatwhitefamilymusic.com

Fat White Family are an English rock band, formed in 2011 in Peckham, South London. Frontman Lias Saoudi has remained the project's sole constant member across multiple line-up changes. The band's current line-up also includes Lias's brother and fellow founding member Nathan Saoudi (keyboards), Adam J Harmer (guitar), Adam Brennan (guitar), Alex White (keyboards, saxophone, percussion), Victor Jakeman (bass, keyboards) and Guilherme Fells (drums). Guitarist Saul Adamczewski was an on-again-off-again member of the band for much of its career.

Known for their energetic live performances, chaotic personal lives and drug use, the band has released four studio albums: Champagne Holocaust (2013), Songs for Our Mothers (2016), Serfs Up! (2019) and Forgiveness Is Yours (2024).

In 2022, Lias Saoudi and writer Adelle Stripe co-wrote the autobiographical book, Ten Thousand Apologies: Fat White Family and the Miracle of Failure, which chronicled the band's turbulent history. The band has spawned several side projects and spin-off bands, including the Moonlandingz, Warmduscher, Decius and Insecure Men.

== History ==
=== 2011–2012: Formation and early career ===
Lias and Nathan Saoudi grew up in Southampton, Ireland and Scotland before forming The Saoudis with Alex Sebley in the 2000s, including a tour to their father's home country of Algeria.

In 2011, Lias and Nathan Saoudi met Saul Adamczwski. He was the former frontman of indie pop band the Metros. The trio, united by a shared distaste for mainstream music and a passion for transgressive art, began writing songs in a squat in Peckham.

They were joined by Joe Panucci (also formerly of the Metros), guitarist Adam J. Harmer, and drummer Dan Lyons, completing the original six-piece lineup.

The band would rehearse at the Queen's Head, Stockwell.

=== 2013-2015: Champagne Holocaust ===
Fat White Family released their debut album, Champagne Holocaust, in 2013 through the independent UK label Trashmouth Records.

The album, noted for its lo-fi production and provocative lyrical themes, helped establish the band's reputation for irreverence and sonic unpredictability. In 2014, Champagne Holocaust was released in the United States via Fat Possum Records, broadening their international reach.

On 11 December 2013, the band released Fat Whites/Taman Shud, a split EP with fellow experimental rock band Taman Shud, also on Trashmouth Records.

Their first official single, "Touch the Leather," was released on 10 March 2014 by Hate Hate Hate Records. The track, a sleazy, minimalist groove with a sardonic tone, quickly became one of their most recognisable songs and marked a breakthrough in broader public attention.

In early 2014, Fat White Family launched a PledgeMusic campaign to support their appearance at the South by Southwest (SXSW) festival in Austin, Texas, and to fund a subsequent U.S. tour. As part of the campaign, contributors received an exclusive, self-released EP titled Crippled B-Sides and Inconsequential Rarities, which compiled early demos and unreleased material.

Later that year, on 15 December 2014, the band released the single "I Am Mark E Smith," a frenetic tribute to the enigmatic frontman Mark E. Smith of the post-punk band The Fall.

=== 2016-2018: Songs for Our Mothers ===
The band's second studio album, Songs for Our Mothers, was released in 2016 via Without Consent, an independent record label based in South London. The record marked a darker and more confrontational turn in both tone and subject matter, blending political provocation with surrealist imagery. Frontman Lias Saoudi described the album as an attempt "to really get at the shittiness lurking in the core of my own soul, and in everybody else's," reflecting the band's ongoing commitment to abrasive self-examination and cultural critique.

The album was promoted by the lead single "Whitest Boy on the Beach," a sinister, synth-driven track that received critical acclaim for its satirical edge and haunting atmosphere. Lyrically, the song was inspired by a beach trip taken by the Saoudis and Adamczewski after the release of Champagne Holocaust. The song gained wider recognition when it was used during the closing credits of Danny Boyle's 2017 film T2 Trainspotting, introducing the band to a broader audience.

Following the album's release, Fat White Family issued the standalone single "Breaking Into Aldi" on 16 August 2016. The track, equal parts absurd and anarchic, was recorded in collaboration with Sean Lennon and Cole Alexander of The Black Lips.

=== 2019-2023: Serfs Up! and Ten Thousand Apologies ===
On 9 January 2019, Fat White Family announced their third studio album, Serfs Up!, would be released on 19 April 2019 through Domino Records. The album marked a significant sonic shift for the band, incorporating lusher production, disco influences, and a more refined, albeit still subversive, sound.

The album was preceded by the singles "Feet" and "Tastes Good with the Money". The latter featured spoken word vocals by Baxter Dury and was accompanied by a surreal music video directed by Róisín Murphy.

Serfs Up! was widely praised by critics, with Adelle Stripe describing it in The Quietus as "triumphant" and "transcendent." The Irish Times noted the album's apocalyptic charm, writing that it "feels like a pop album you might slap on as the world is about to end or you’ve just learned Brexit has been pushed back to 2020."

In 2022, the band's tumultuous history was chronicled in a biography titled Ten Thousand Apologies: Fat White Family and the Miracle of Failure, co-written by Lias Saoudi and author Adelle Stripe. The book offered an unflinching account of the band's chaotic rise, substance abuse, internal conflicts, and moments of creative brilliance. Miranda Sawyer, writing for The Observer, described it as "the story of a band that’s always on the brink: of stardom, of madness, of brilliance, of disgrace." The book was shortlisted for the 2023 Penderyn Music Book Prize, recognising it as a standout work in the realm of music writing.

=== 2024–present: Forgiveness Is Yours ===
On 26 April 2024, the band released their fourth studio album Forgiveness Is Yours. Describing the album upon its eventual release, Lias Saoudi stated: "Forgiveness Is Yours is about life as eternal contingency. About no longer suspecting, but knowing that this shit will never get any easier… in fact, it’s about to get a whole lot worse, your body’s going to go into decay and the people you love will slowly start dropping dead around you. But somehow, you’ve smashed enough of your expectations thus far in life, you’re sort of fine with it. You accept it. The overarching aesthetic themes at work here are torpor and further torpor still." Longtime members Saul Adamczewski and Nathan Saoudi departed from the band before the album's completion.

Following his departure, Nathan Saoudi embarked on new musical ventures. In early 2025, he co-founded a new project called Uncle Daddy with former Fat White Family bassist Joseph Pancucci and electronic musician Richard Wilson. The group released their debut track "Blood" in October 2024. Following his departure from Fat White Family, Saul Adamczewski has focused on other musical projects, including his work with Insecure Men. He released A Man for All Seasons, his second Insecure Men album on November 7, 2025.

In February 2026, Adamczewski revealed in an interview that, after several years of animosity, he had rejoined Fat White Family, and that the band had been working on a potentially final album together: "Well, we’re like brothers. The minute we sit down together, we just pick up exactly where we’d left off. The last album was so incredibly pony. We know that it should never be the last Fat White Family record, not in a million years. So we’re looking at it like we’ll make one last good record and have one last good year of festivals." Adamczewski's planned return to Fat White Family was never confirmed or announced by the band. In August 2026, Adamczewski was accused of domestic abuse and assault by multiple women. In October 2026, Fat White Family supported the Strokes on their UK and European arena tour in support of Reality Awaits (2026), with founding keyboardist Nathan Saoudi rejoining the band after a lengthy absence.

== Influences ==
Fat White Family have cited influences including Brian Jonestown Massacre, the Fall, the Birthday Party, the Gun Club, Country Teasers, Butthole Surfers, Bongwater, Charles Manson, the Cramps, Country Teasers, Captain Beefheart, the Fugs, Holy Modal Rounders, Nirvana, the Monks, Television Personalities, Kilburn and the Highroads, Sid Vicious, Harry Nilsson, Van Morrison, Gavin Bryars, Tina Turner and Ike Turner.

== Other projects ==
In 2014, the post-punk and disco group Warmduscher formed and both Saoudi brothers and Adamczewski are on-and-off collaborators in the studio and at live sets. Other Fat White Family members with a more consistent role in Warmduscher are Harmer, Everett and Romans-Hopcraft.

In 2015, Adamczewski and Lias Saoudi collaborated with Adrian Flanagan and Dean Honer of experimental band Eccentronic Research Council on their album Johnny Rocket, Narcissist & Music Machine... I'm Your Biggest Fan. After its release, the partnership took concepts from the album to form a new band called the Moonlandingz. The act ended up touring together, as well as working with Sean Lennon, Yoko Ono, Philip Oakey, Randy Jones and Slow Club frontwoman Rebecca Taylor, resulting in the 2017 release of their debut album, Interplanetary Class Classics. A second Moonlandingz album, No Rocket Required, was released in April 2025.

In January 2017, Adamczewski formed the band Insecure Men with Lennon (guitar), Ben Romans-Hopcraft (bass), Jack Everett (drums), Jon Catfish de Lorene (keyboards) and Alex White (saxophone). Lennon co-produced their eponymous debut album, released in February 2018.

Lias Saoudi is a member of electronica band Decius alongside Liam and Luke May (founders of Trashmouth Records) and Quinn Whalley (Paranoid London/Warmduscher). The group released their debut full-length album Decius Vol. I on The Leaf Label in November 2022. The band's second studio album, Decius Vol. II (Splendour & Obedience), was released in January 2025.

== Members ==
Current members

- Lias Kaci Saoudi – lead vocals (2011–present)
- Nathan Saoudi – keyboards (2011–2023; 2026–present)
- Adam J. Harmer – guitar
- Adam Brennan – guitar, bass guitar
- Alex White – saxophone, keyboards, percussion, backing vocals
- Guilherme Fells – drums
- Victor Jakeman – bass guitar (2024–present)

Former members

- Saul Adamczewski – guitar, vocals
- Samuel Toms - drums
- Ciaran Hartnett – bass
- Benjamin Romans Hopcraft – bass guitar, various instruments
- Jack Everett – drums
- Joseph Pancucci-Simpson – bass
- Dan Lyons – drums
- Jak Payne – bass
- Taishi Nagasaka – bass
- Severin Black – drums

Temporary members

- Chris O.C – drums
- Dale Barclay – guitar (d. 2018)
- Martin Dean – drums
- Mike Brandon – guitar
- Mairead O'Connor – guitar, bass
- Chris Taylor – guitar
- Rob Doyle – bongos

== Discography ==
=== Studio albums ===
- Champagne Holocaust (Trashmouth/Fat Possum, 2013)
- Songs for Our Mothers (Without Consent/Fat Possum, 2016)
- Serfs Up! (Domino, 2019)
- Forgiveness Is Yours (Domino, 2024)

=== EPs ===
- Fat Whites/Taman Shud (Trashmouth, 2013)
- Crippled B-Sides and Inconsequential Rarities (self-released, 2014)

=== Singles ===
- "Touch the Leather" (Hate Hate Hate, 2014)
- "I Am Mark E Smith" (Without Consent, 2014)
- "Whitest Boy on the Beach" (Without Consent, 2016)
- "Breaking Into Aldi" (Without Consent, 2016)
- "Feet" (Domino, 2019)
- "Tastes Good With The Money" (Domino, 2019)
- "When I Leave" (Domino, 2019)
- "Religion for One" (Domino, 2024)
- "Bullet of Dignity" (Domino, 2024)
- "What's that You Say?" (2024)
