= List of The Specials band members =

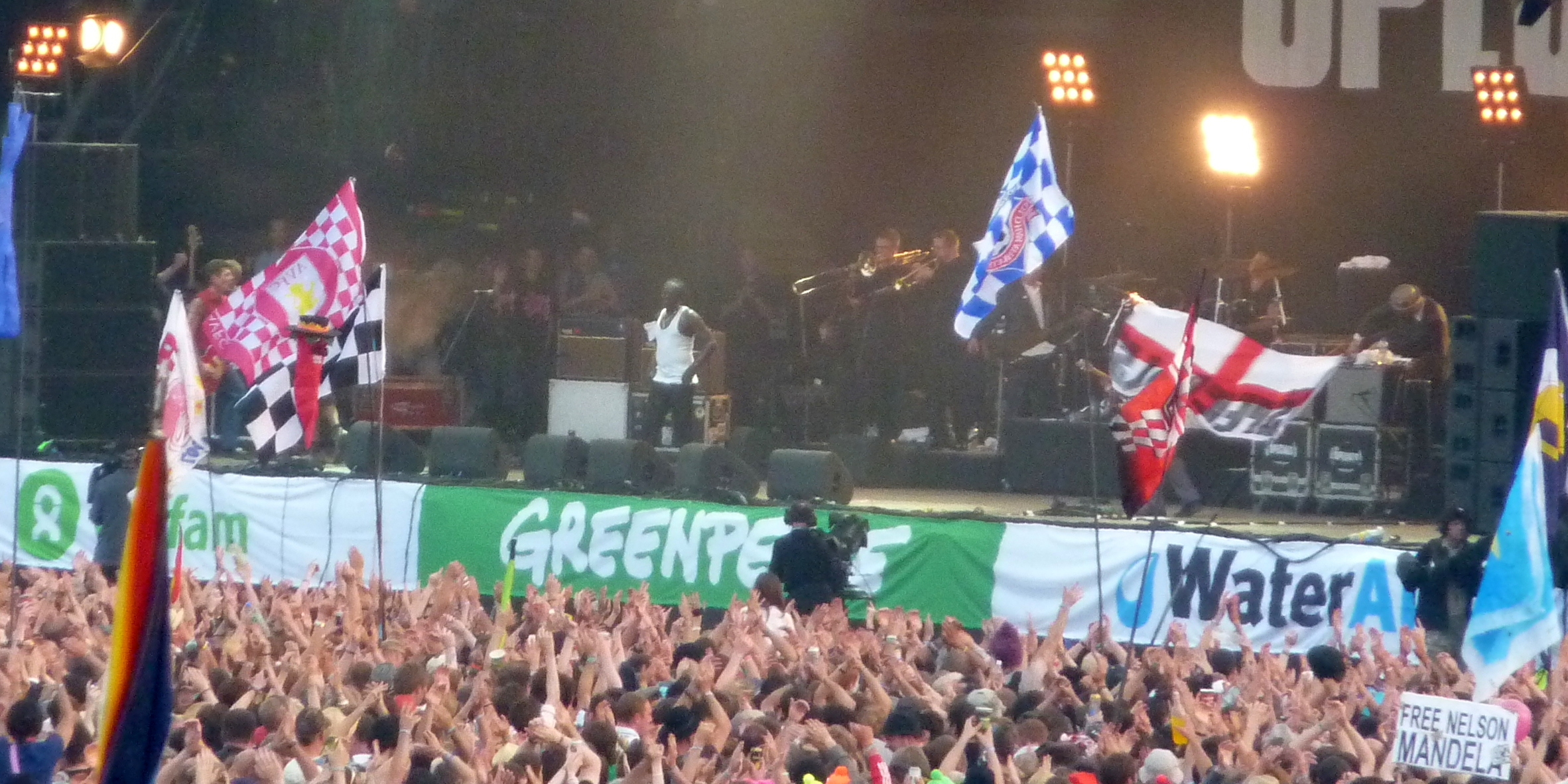
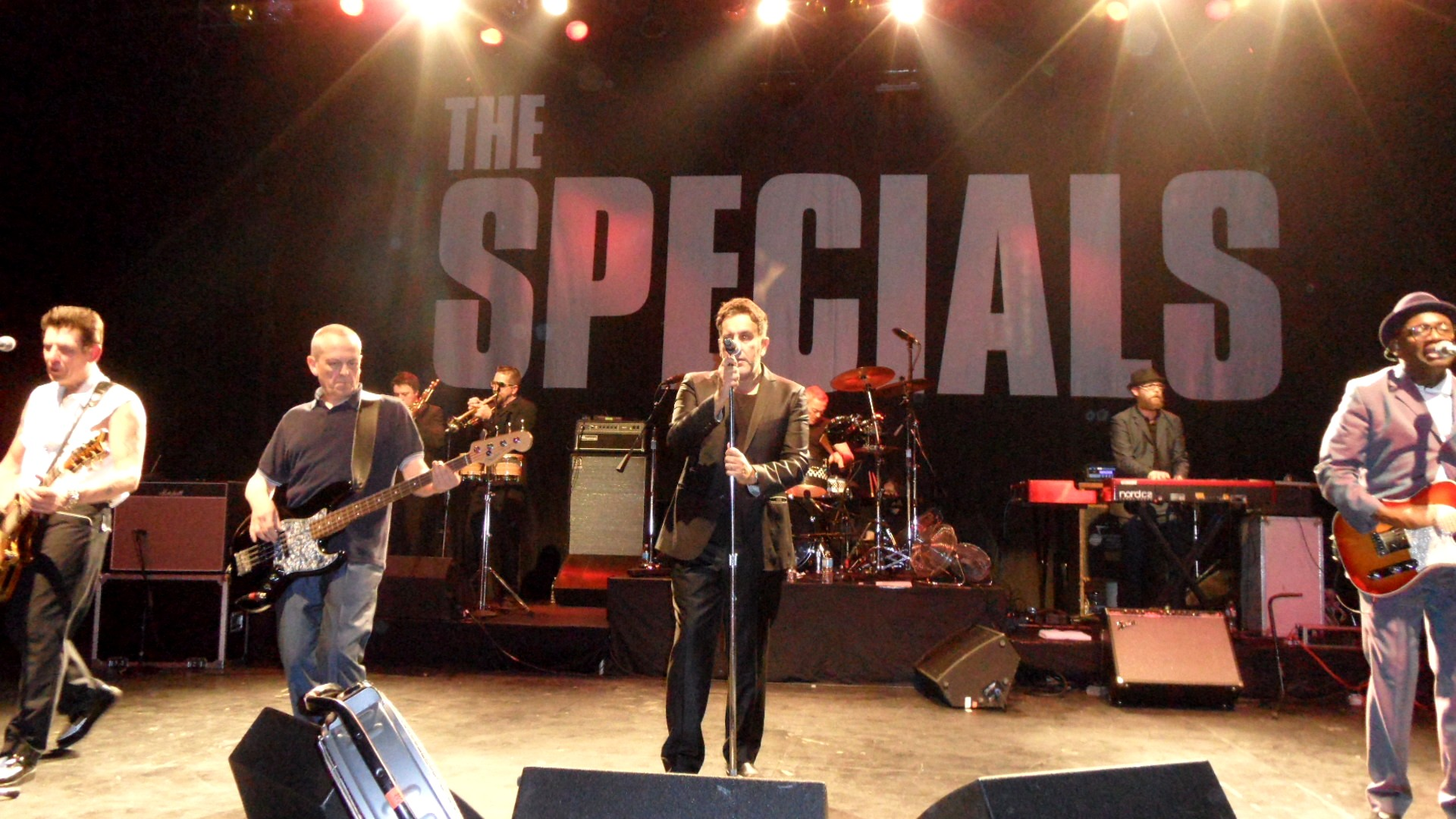
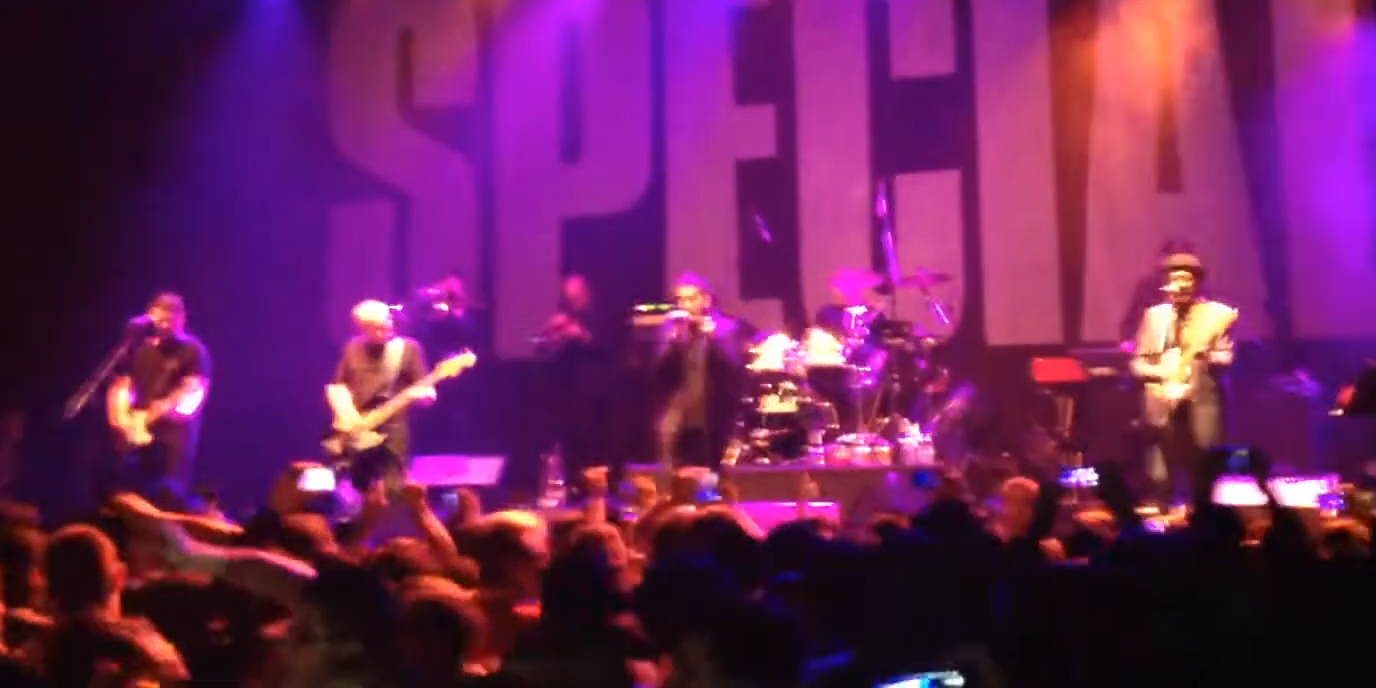
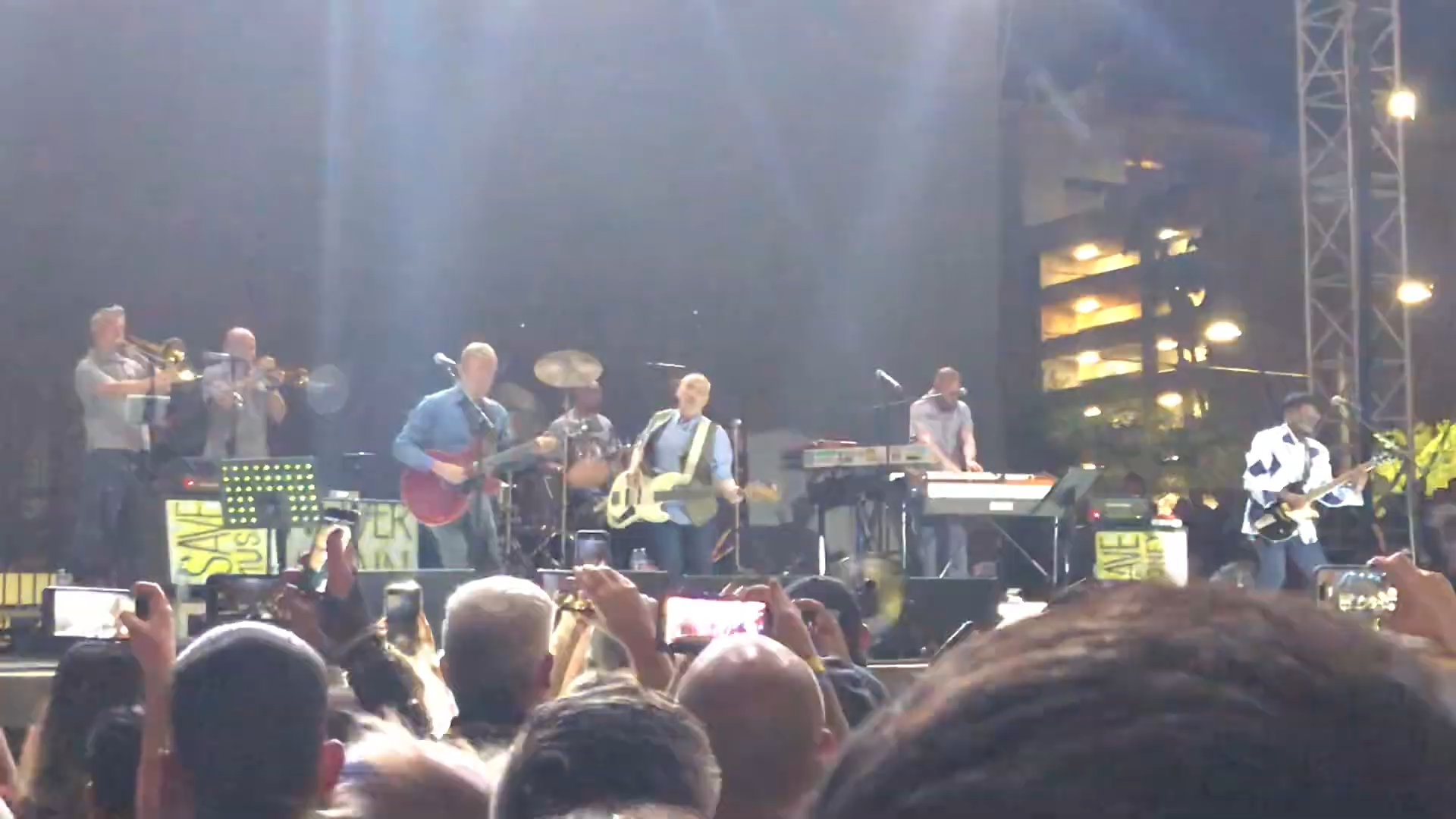
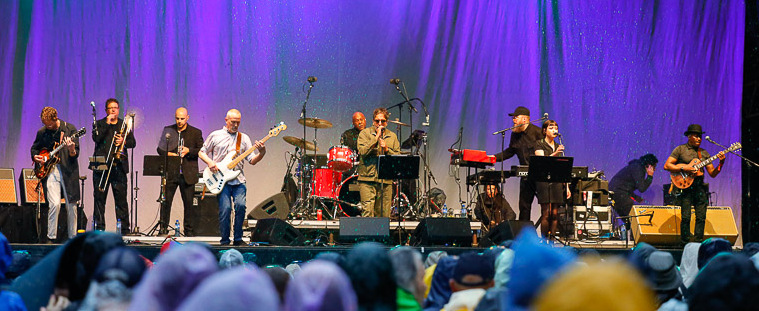
The Specials performing in 2009, 2013, 2015, 2019 and 2022

The Specials were an English 2 tone and ska revival band formed in 1977 in Coventry. The first stable lineup of the group consisted of Terry Hall and Neville Staple on vocals, Jerry Dammers on keyboards, Lynval Golding and Roddy Radiation on guitars, Horace Panter on bass, John Bradbury on drums, and Dick Cuthell and Rico Rodriguez on horns.

No one person stayed with the Specials through every line-up change, though there were players (including Hall, Staple, Panter, Golding, and Radiation) who left and returned -- sometimes more than once. By the time the band disbanded in 2022, they consisted of Hall (who had recently died), Golding and Panter, alongside keyboardist Nikolaj Torp Larsen and trombonist Tim Smart (both since 2008), lead guitarist Steve Cradock and trumpeter Pablo Mendelssohn (both since 2014), drummer Kendrick Rowe (since 2019), vocalist Hannah Hu and rhythm guitarist Stan Samuel (both since 2021).

== History ==
The group was formed in 1977 by songwriter/keyboardist Dammers, vocalist Tim Strickland, guitarist/vocalist Lynval Golding, drummer Silverton Hutchinson and bassist Horace Panter (a.k.a. Sir Horace Gentleman). Strickland was replaced by Terry Hall shortly after the band's formation. The band was first called the Automatics, then the Coventry Automatics. Guitarist Roddy Byers (usually known as Roddy Radiation) agreed to join the band in March 1978 ahead of a recording session of demos. During the tour Neville Staple, who was initially one of the roadies, became a full member of The Specials. In 1979, drummer Hutchinson left the band and was replaced by John Bradbury. Horn players Dick Cuthell and Rico Rodriguez also joined the band at the same time.

In 1981 Staple, Hall and Golding all left the band. Rodriguez and Panter also stopped performing with the band. Rhoda Dakar (previously a backing vocalist) joined as permanent vocalist, alongside John Shipley (from the Swinging Cats) on guitar, and Nicky Summers on bass. Rodriguez and Panter returned to the band for touring. After touring, Dakar briefly departed the band were briefly joined by Satch Dickson and Groco (percussion) and Anthony Wymshurst (guitar). Dakar soon returned alongside new co-vocalists Egidio Newton and Stan Campbell, as well as violinist Nick Parker. The new line-up (still known as the Special AKA) finally issued a new full-length album In the Studio in 1984. Officially, the band was now a sextet: Dakar, Campbell, Bradbury, Dammers, Shipley and new bassist Gary McManus. Dammers then dissolved the band and pursued political activism.

The first reunion under the Specials name occurred in 1993. Participants were Radiation, Staple, Golding and Panter, they were also joined by Aitch Bembridge of The Selecter on drums, and keyboardist Mark Adams. The band fully reunited in 1996, again with Bembridge and Adams and horn players Adam Birch and Jon Read, after successful touring the band stopped performing in 1998. The band returned in 2000 with Staple, Panter and Byers, featuring The Selecter's Neol Davies in place of Golding as well as Anthony Harty on drums, Justin Dodsworth on keyboards, Steve Holdway on trombone, Paul Daleman on trumpet, and Leigh Malin on tenor saxophone.

In 2008, Terry Hall reunited with the band, alongside Staple, Panter, Golding, Byers, Bradbury, Birch and Read, and new members Nikolaj Torp Larsen (keyboards), Drew Stansall (saxophone) and Tim Smart (trombone). Birch had departed by 2010. Staple departed in January 2013, due to personal reasons. Byers also departed in February 2014. He was replaced by Steve Cradock. The band were also joined by Pablo Mandleson on trumpet around the same time. On 28 December 2015, drummer Bradbury died. he was replaced by Libertines drummer Gary Powell. In 2019, Kenrick Rowe replaced Powell. Stansall also departed. Sid Gauld briefly replaced Mandleson in 2021. Also in 2021 Stan Samuel joined the band on rhythm guitar, and Hannah Hu also joined on second vocals.

On 19 December 2022, Terry Hall died. Panter confirmed the end of the band in November 2023.

== Members ==
Image	Name	Years active	Instruments	Release contributions
	Jerry Dammers	1977–1981; 1981–1984	keyboards; principal songwriter; vocals	all releases from The Specials (1979) to In the Studio (1984), BBC Radio 1 Live in Concert (1992); Live – Too Much Too Young (1992); Live at the Moonlight Club (1992); Blue Plate Specials Live (1999)
	Horace Panter	1977–1981; 1982; 1993; 1994–1998; 2000–2001; 2008–2022	bass guitar	all The Specials releases
	Lynval Golding	1977–1981; 1993; 1994–1998; 2008–2022	vocals; rhythm and lead guitar; harmonica	all releases except Skinhead Girl (2000) and Conquering Ruler (2001)
	Silverton Hutchinson	1977–1979	drums	Dawning of a New Era (1993) (Demos recorded 1978)
	Tim Strickland	1977	Lead vocals	None
	Terry Hall	1977–1981; 2008–2022 (until his death)	all releases from The Specials (1979) to More Specials (1980); BBC Radio 1 Live in Concert (1992); Live – Too Much Too Young (1992); Live at the Moonlight Club (1992); Blue Plate Specials Live (1999); More... Or Less: The Specials Live (2012); Encore (2019); Protest Songs 1924–2012 (2021)	
	Roddy "Radiation" Byers	1978–1981; 1993; 1996–2001; 2008–2014	lead guitar; vocals	all releases from The Specials (1979) to More... Or Less: The Specials Live (2012)
	Neville Staple	1978–1981; 1993; 1996–2001; 2008–2012	toasting; vocals; percussion	all releases from The Specials (1979) to More... Or Less: The Specials Live (2012), except In the Studio (1984)
	John Bradbury	1979–1984; 2008–2015 (until his death)	drums	all releases from The Specials (1979) to In the Studio (1984); BBC Radio 1 Live in Concert (1992); Live – Too Much Too Young (1992); Live at the Moonlight Club (1992); Blue Plate Specials Live (1999); More... Or Less: The Specials Live (2012); Encore (2019) some live tracks
	Dick Cuthell	1979–1984	flugelhorn; trumpet	all releases from The Specials (1979) to In the Studio (1984)
	Rico Rodriguez	1979–1981; 1982 (died 2015)	trombone; vocals	all releases from The Specials (1979) to In the Studio (1984)
	Rhoda Dakar	1981–1982; 1982–1984	vocals	More Specials (1980); In the Studio (1984)
	Stan Campbell	1982–1984	vocals	In the Studio (1984)
	John Shipley	1981–1984	guitar	In the Studio (1984)
	Anthony Wimshurst	1982	guitar	none
	Satch Dixon	1982	percussion	none
	Tony 'Groco' Uter	1982	percussion	In the Studio (1984); Protest Songs 1924–2012 (2021)
	Egidio Newton	1982–1983	vocals; percussion	In the Studio (1984)
	Nick Parker	1982	violin	In the Studio (1984)
	Gary McManus	1983–1984	bass guitar	In the Studio (1984)
	Mark Adams	1993; 1994–1998	keyboards; backing vocals	Today's Specials (1996); Ghost Town Live (1999)
	Aitch Bembridge	1993; 1994–1998	drums; backing vocals	Today's Specials (1996); Ghost Town Live (1999)
	Jon Read	1996–1998; 2008–2014	trumpet; percussion; bass guitar; accordion	Guilty 'til Proved Innocent! (1998); More... Or Less: The Specials Live (2012)
	Adam Birch	1996–1998; 2008–2010	trumpet; trombone; backing vocals	Guilty 'til Proved Innocent! (1998); Ghost Town Live (1999)
	Kendell Smith	1998	vocals	none
	Neol Davies	2000–2001	rhythm guitar; vocals	Skinhead Girl (2000); Conquering Ruler (2001)
	Justin Dodsworth	2000–2001	keyboards	Skinhead Girl (2000); Conquering Ruler (2001)
	Anthony Harty	2000–2001	drums; percussion	Skinhead Girl (2000); Conquering Ruler (2001)
	Paul Daleman	2000–2001	trumpet	Skinhead Girl (2000); Conquering Ruler (2001)
	Leigh Malin	2000–2001	tenor saxophone	Skinhead Girl (2000); Conquering Ruler (2001)
	Steve Holdway	2000–2001	trombone	Skinhead Girl (2000); Conquering Ruler (2001)
	Tim Smart	2008–2022	trombone	Encore (2019); Protest Songs 1924–2012 (2021); More... Or Less: The Specials Live (2012)
	Nikolaj Torp Larsen	2008–2022	keyboards; vocals	Encore (2019); Protest Songs 1924–2012 (2021); More... Or Less: The Specials Live (2012)
	Drew Stansall	2008–2012	saxophone; flute	More... Or Less: The Specials Live (2012)
	Steve Cradock	2014–2022	lead guitar; vocals	Encore (2019); Protest Songs 1924–2012 (2021)
	Pablo Mendelssohn	2014–2022	trumpet; flugelhorn	Encore (2019); Protest Songs 1924–2012 (2021)
	Gary Powell	2016–2019	drums	Encore (2019) some live tracks
	Kenrick Rowe	2019–2022	drums	Encore (2019); Protest Songs 1924–2012 (2021)
	Hannah Hu	2021–2022	vocals	Protest Songs 1924–2012 (2021)
	Stan Samuel	2021–2022	rhythm guitar	none
	Sid Gauld	2021	trumpet	none
