= Songs for Our Mothers =

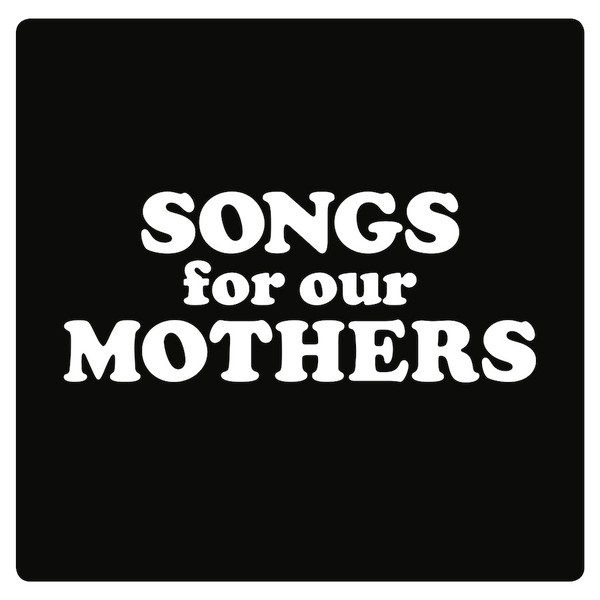

Studio album by Fat White Family
- Released: 22 January 2016
- Genre: Post-punk
- Length: 46:19
- Label: Fat Possum

Fat White Family chronology
Champagne Holocaust (2013)	Songs for Our Mothers (2016)	Serfs Up! (2019)

Professional ratings
Aggregate scores
Source	Rating
AnyDecentMusic?	6.1/10
Metacritic	63/100
Review scores
Source	Rating
AllMusic	2.5/5 stars
The Guardian	3/5 stars
The Irish Times	3/5 stars
Mojo	4/5 stars
NME	4/5
The Observer	3/5 stars
Pitchfork	6.3/10
Q	3/5 stars
Record Collector	2/5 stars
Uncut	6/10

Songs for Our Mothers is the second studio album by British post-punk band Fat White Family. It was released in January 2016 under Fat Possum Records.

== Track listing ==
No.	Title	Length
1.	"Whitest Boy on the Beach"	4:53
2.	"Satisfied"	3:40
3.	"Love Is the Crack"	4:19
4.	"Duce"	6:40
5.	"Lebensraum"	2:46
6.	"Hits Hits Hits"	3:40
7.	"Tinfoil Deathstar"	3:59
8.	"When Shipman Decides"	3:43
9.	"We Must Learn to Rise"	7:10
10.	"Goodbye Goebbels"	5:29

== Charts ==
Chart (2016)	Peak position
Belgian Albums (Ultratop Flanders)	119
Belgian Albums (Ultratop Wallonia)	159
French Albums (SNEP)	153
UK Albums (OCC)	61
