= The Moonlandingz =

English rock band

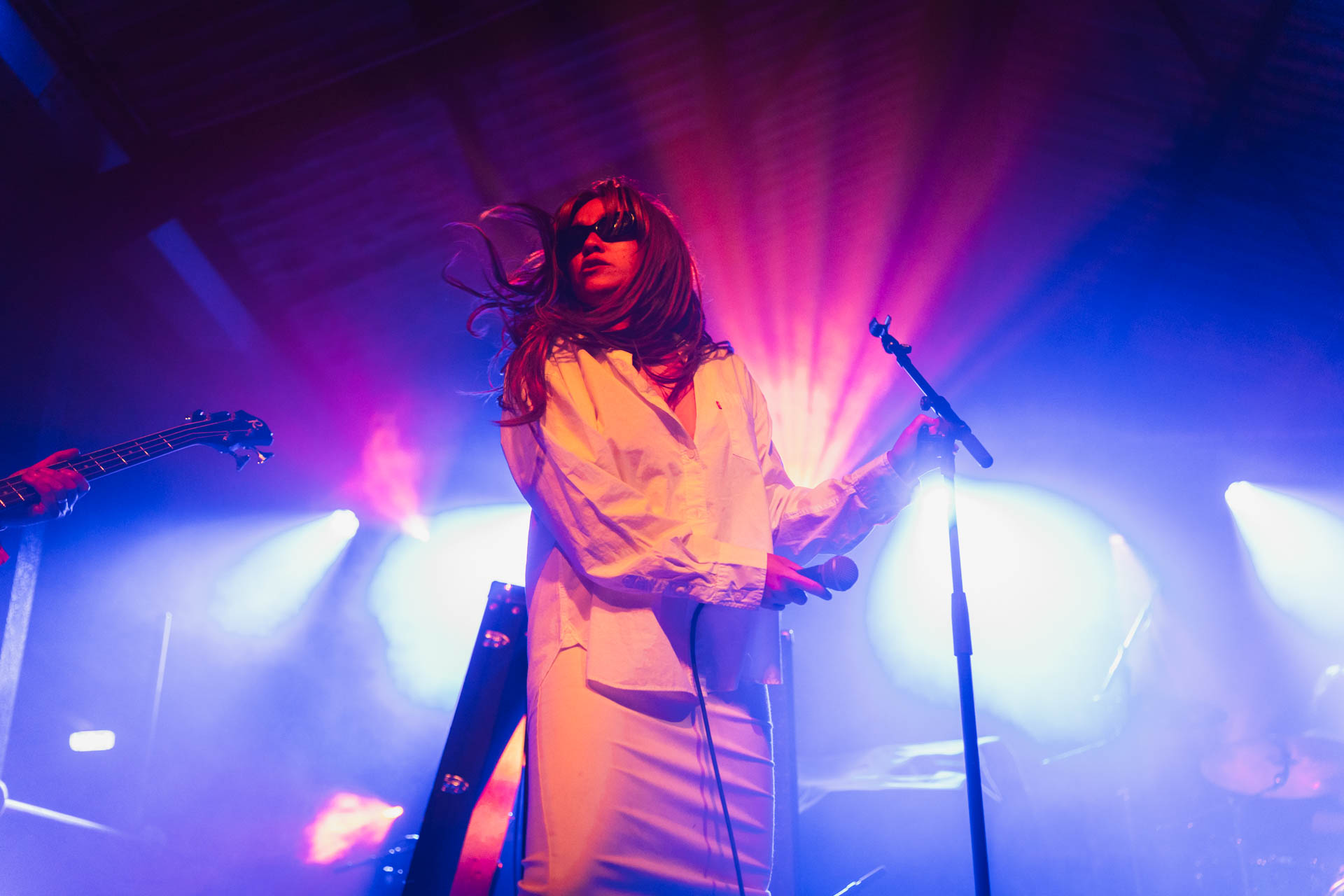
- in 2025 by Paul Hudson

Background information
- Origin: Sheffield, South Yorkshire, England
- Genres: Neo-psychedelia; experimental rock
- Years active: 2015–present
- Labels: Chimera Music; Transgressive; Without Consent
- Members: Saul Adamczewski; Adrian Flanagan; Dean Honer; Lias Kaci Saoudi; Mairead O'Connor

The Moonlandingz are an English rock band, formed in 2015. The band consists of Eccentronic Research Council duo Adrian Flanagan and Dean Honer, along with Fat White Family members Saul Adamczewski and Lias Kaci Saoudi. The band was originally designed as a concept act for the Eccentronic Research Council's fifth album Johnny Rocket, Narcissist and Music Machine…I'm Your Biggest Fan, with the act's charismatic and otherworldly frontman Johnny Rocket being played by Saoudi.

Since the release of Johnny Rocket, Narcissist and Music Machine…I'm Your Biggest Fan in 2015, the group have continued to play live and record together, releasing two EPs under The Moonlandingz name and a full-length album - Interplanetary Class Classics in 2017.

== History ==
The band started as a concept created by Eccentronic Research Council members Adrian Flanagan and Dean Honer, while planning the band's fourth album Johnny Rocket, Narcissist & Music Machine... I'm Your Biggest Fan. During the process, Fat White Family members Saul Adamczewski and Lias Kaci Saoudi were brought on board to conceive of a fictional band for the album. The results were a band called The Moonlandingz, led by the eponymous singer Johnny Rocket who would be voiced by Saoudi. To accompany the release of their album, The Moonlandingz EP was also released under the guise of The Moonlandingz.

After the album was released in 2015, the four collaborators decided to continue their partnership and turn the Moonlandingz concept into an actual live band. They quickly followed up by another EP - Blak Hanz, which was released on Transgressive Records in 2016.

The band released their debut album, Interplanetary Class Classics, in 2017. It was released on Transgressive Records in Europe and in the U.S. on Chimera Records. The album was created in collaboration with Sean Lennon and was recorded at his studio in New York. Former Add N to (X) drummer Ross Orton and guitarist/bassist Mairead O'Connor also recorded with the band and featured as band members on the subsequent tour.

The band released its second studio album, No Rocket Required, on 25 April 2025 through Transgressive Records in vinyl, CD and digital formats. They played at the Krankenhaus Festival at Muncaster Castle in the Lake District in August 2025.

== Members ==
Current members

- Saul Adamczewski - guitar
- Adrian Flanagan - keyboards
- Dean Honer - keyboards
- Lias Kaci Saoudi – vocals
- Mairead O'Connor - guitar
- Bradley from Bridlington - guitar

== Discography ==
=== Studio albums ===
- Interplanetary Class Classics (2017, Transgressive Records)
- No Rocket Required (2025, Transgressive Records)

=== EPs ===
- The Moonlandingz EP (2015, Without Consent)
- Blak Hanz (2016, Transgressive Records)
