= Warmduscher =

English post-punk band

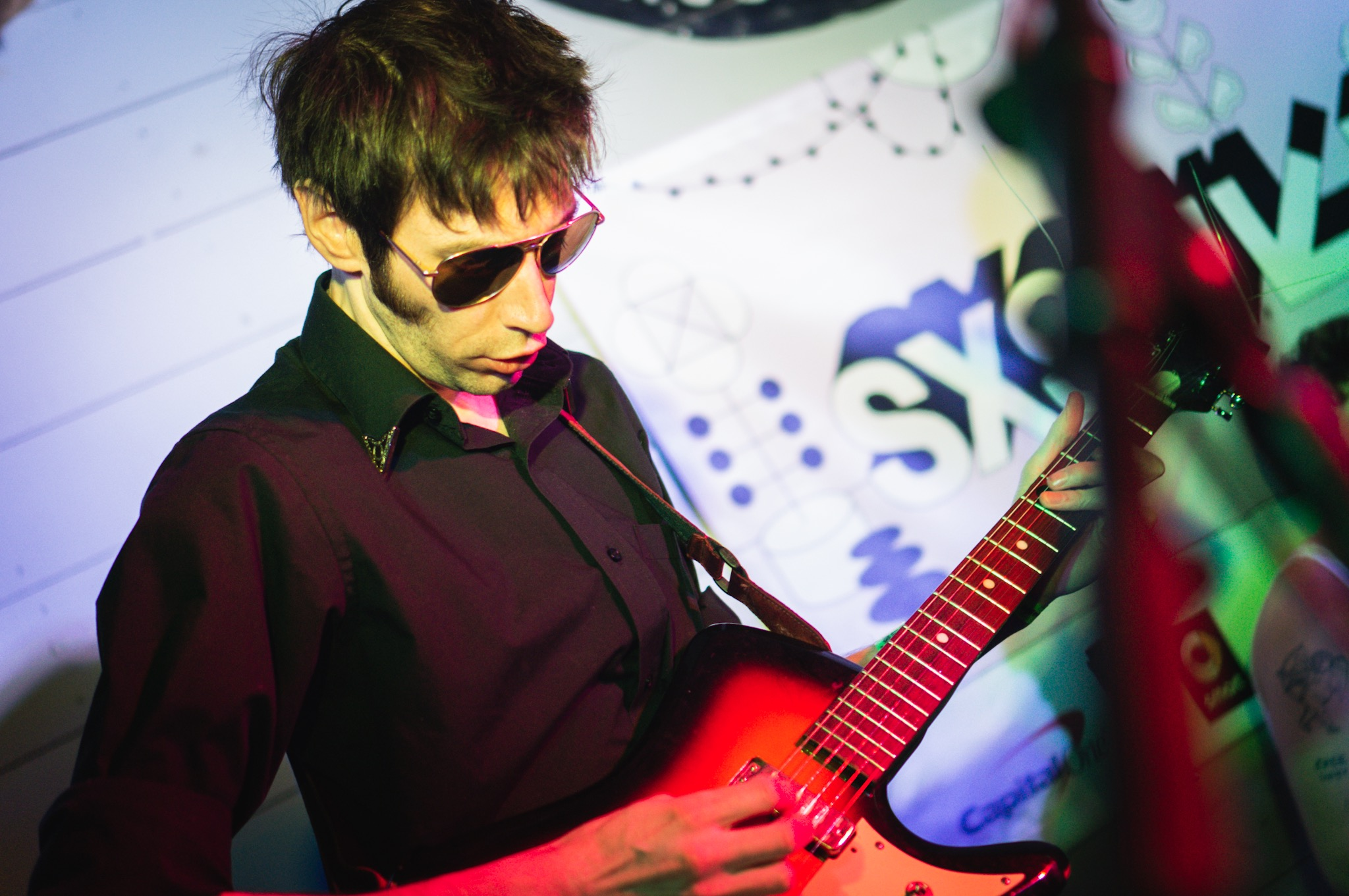
- Warmduscher performing at SXSW 2019

Background information
- Origin: London, United Kingdom
- Genres: Garage rock; post-punk; electronic music
- Years active: 2014–present
- Labels: The Leaf Label; Trashmouth; Bella Union; Strap Originals
- Spinoff of: Fat White Family
- Members: Clams Baker Jr; Benjamin Romans Hopcraft; Adam J. Harmer; Quinn Whalley; Marley Mackey; Bleu Ottis
- Past members: Saul Adamczewski; Jack Everett
- Website: warmduscher.co.uk

Warmduscher is a British post-punk band formed in 2014 in London. The group is currently affiliated with the independent record label Strap Originals.

Members of the band include Craig Higgins (Clams Baker Jr.), Benjamin Romans-Hopcraft (Mr. Salt Fingers Lovecraft), Adam J. Harmer (Quicksand), Quinn Whalley (The Witherer), Marley Mackey (Three Piece aka the Worm), and Bleu Ottis (Bleucifer).

== Background ==
The band was formed on New Year's Eve in 2014 to play an impromptu show at a house party. The initial lineup featured Higgins as vocalist and Harmer on drums, alongside Saul Adamczewski and Lias Kaci Saoudi of Fat White Family on bass and guitar, respectively. The group then continued as a quintet, with Everett (drums), Romans-Hopcraft (bass), and Whalley (noise/electronics) replacing Adamczewski and Saoudi.

== Career ==
Khaki Tears, the band's debut album, was released by Trashmouth Records on May 11, 2015. Described as "the finest of filth" and "fractured rock and roll at its best" by Louder Than War, the band explains the album's title as "the time it takes for you to pluck up the courage for something" and "the ability to cry while eating your cake no matter what it's made of".

The album was followed by the single Big Wilma/Neon Tongues, produced by Dan Carey and released with The Leaf Label on 12 January 2018. Described as a "mix of in-your-face punk and sinister electronica", the single was made available on a limited edition run of 300 7" singles. Clash called the group "the sleaziest, most debauched, and downright addictive experiences in London's guitar underground right now".

Warmduscher's second album, Whale City, was released with The Leaf Label on 1 June 2018 and has been described by the band as "a playground for the people that have stepped above and beyond their comfort zone". Too Many Blogs called the album "dangerously debauched, infested with twisted riffs and cleverly assembled by Dan Carey’s production". "Standing On The Corner", the second single from Whale City, was released on 6 April 2018 and called a "knock out blow" by Clash Magazine. "1000 Whispers", the third single, followed on 16 May 2018. Saul Adamczewski left the band shortly after the recording of Whale City. Fellow Fat White Family bandmate Adam J Harmer took over on guitar for Warmduscher.

On 11 November 2019, the band released their third album Tainted Lunch, which featured guest appearances by Iggy Pop and Kool Keith. The album was recorded in just four days, with producer Dan Carey, and garnered widespread acclaim. BBC Radio 6 Music placed the album at #6 in their Albums of the Year 2019 and The Line Of Best Fit awarded it a 9/10, calling the album "gritty, poppy, tasty, and utter, utter filth".

Warmduscher released European Cowboy in 2020 for Record Store Day. The EP features three remixes by Soulwax, Savage Gary, and Decius and was limited to 1000 vinyl copies.

Warmduscher released At The Hotspot in 2022 and was released by Bella Union and was produced by Al Doyle and Joe Goddard from Hot Chip.

Warmduscher's latest album Too Cold to Hold was released in 2024 and produced by bassist Benjamin Romans Hopcraft and Jamie Neville.

== Band name ==
The name "Warmduscher" is German which literally translates to "warm showerer", colloquially a derogatory term referring to somebody who is perceived as a wimp, or as not tough enough for life.

== Other projects ==
Guitarist Adam J. Harmer is also a full-time member of the South London band Fat White Family, which also includes Lias Kaci Saoudi (a short-lived early member of Warmduscher), and founding member Saul Adamczewski.

Bass guitarist Benjamin Romans-Hopcraft is one-half of the duo Insecure Men, alongside Saul Adamczewski. Romans-Hopcraft notes: "He's a complicated customer, but I've learned so much from Saul." He is also currently in Miss Tiny alongside producer Dan Carey.

Prior to forming the band in London, Clams Baker ran club nights in Manhattan, New York and was mentored by drag queens.

== Personal lives ==
Multi-instrumentalist Marley Mackey is the son of Pulp bass guitarist Steve Mackey, while Quinn Whalley is the son of Slade lead vocalist Steve Whalley, who replaced Noddy Holder between 1992 and 2005.

== Band members ==
Current members

- Craig Higgins (Clams Baker Jr.) – lead vocals (2014–present)
- Adam J. Harmer (Quicksand) – guitar (2014–present)
- Benjamin Romans-Hopcraft (Mr. Salt Fingers Lovecraft) – bass guitar (2014–present)
- Quinn Whalley (The Witherer) – various instruments
- Marley Mackey (Three Piece aka. the Worm) – various instruments
- Bleu Ottis (Bleucifer) – drums

Former members

- Saul Adamczewski – guitar, bass guitar (2014)
- Lias Kaci Saoudi – guitar (2014)
- Jack Everett – drums

== Discography ==
=== Studio albums ===
- Khaki Tears (2015)
- Whale City (2018)
- Tainted Lunch (2019)
- At the Hotspot (2022)
- Too Cold to Hold (2024)

=== EPs ===
- European Cowboy (2020)

=== Singles ===
- "1000 Whispers" (2018)
- "Standing On The Corner" (2018)
- "Big Wilma/Neon Tongues" (2018)
- "Midnight Dipper" (2019)
- "Disco Peanuts" (2019)
- "Wild Flowers" (2022)
- "Fatso" (2022)
- "8 Minute Machines" (2022)
- Fashion Week (2024)
- Pure at the Heart (2024)
- Stayin Alive (2024)
- Cleopatras (2024)
