= Serfs Up! =

Studio album by Fat White Family
- Released: 19 April 2019
- Genre: Post-punk
- Length: 43:47
- Label: Domino

Fat White Family chronology
Songs for Our Mothers (2016)	Serfs Up! (2019)	Forgiveness Is Yours (2024)

Serfs Up! is the third studio album by British post-punk band Fat White Family. It was released in April 2019 under Domino.

== Critical reception ==
Professional ratings
Aggregate scores
Source	Rating
AnyDecentMusic?	7.3/10
Metacritic	80/100
Review scores
Source	Rating
The Guardian	4/5 stars
Loud and Quiet	8/10
NME	4/5 stars
The Quietus	favourable

Serfs Up! received positive reviews from music critics. On Metacritic, a review aggregator site that compiles reviews from mainstream publications and assigns a weighted average score out of 100, Serfs Up! received a score of 80 that was based on 12 reviews. AnyDecentMusic? compiled 18 reviews and gave the album a score of 7.3 out of 10.

== Track listing ==
No.	Title	Length
1.	"Feet"	5:20
2.	"I Believe in Something Better"	4:28
3.	"Vagina Dentata"	2:59
4.	"Kim's Sunsets"	4:20
5.	"Fringe Runner"	4:32
6.	"Oh Sebastian"	2:44
7.	"Tastes Good with the Money"	5:43
8.	"Rock Fishes"	4:04
9.	"When I Leave"	5:36
10.	"Bobby's Boyfriend"	4:01

== Charts ==
Chart (2019)	Peak position
Belgian Albums (Ultratop Flanders)	96
Belgian Albums (Ultratop Wallonia)	55
French Albums (SNEP)	113
UK Albums (OCC)	17
