= Stereo-Typical: A's, B's and Rarities =

Compilation album by The Specials
- Released: August 28, 2000
- Genre: Ska, new wave
- Label: EMI

The Specials chronology
Best of the Specials (1999)	Stereo-Typical: A's, B's and Rarities (2000)	Skinhead Girl (2000)

Stereo-Typical: A's, B's and Rarities is an official 3 disc compilation album of The Specials. It contains many A and B sides and some rarities. The tracks are variously credited to The Specials, The Special AKA, and other versions of the band's name.

== Track listing ==
=== Disc 1 ===
No.	Title	Writer(s)	Length
1.	"Gangsters" (The Special AKA)	Dammers	2:48
2.	"A Message to You Rudy" (The Specials featuring Rico)	Thompson	2:54
3.	"Nite Klub" (The Specials featuring Rico)	Dammers, The Specials	3:09
4.	"Too Much Too Young" (The Special AKA)	Dammers, Chalmers	2:05
5.	"Guns of Navarone" (The Special AKA)	Tiomkin, Webster	2:19
6.	"Skinhead Symphony" (medley including: Longshot Kick the Bucket / Liquidator / Skinhead Moonstomp) (The Special AKA)	Agard, Crooks, Robinson, Johnson, Ellis, Naysmith	6:37
7.	"Rat Race" (The Specials)	Radiation	3:09
8.	"Rude Boys Outa Jail" (The Specials)	Staples, Golding, Gentlemen	2:39
9.	"Stereotype" (The Specials)	Dammers	3:52
10.	"International Jet Set" (The Specials)	Dammers	4:14
11.	"Do Nothing" (The Specials featuring Rico with The Ice Rink Sounds)	Golding	3:39
12.	"Maggie's Farm" (The Specials featuring Rico with The Ice Rink Sounds)	Dylan	3:33
13.	"Braggin' and Tryin' Not to Lie" (Roddy Radiation & The Specials)	Radiation	3:24
14.	"Rude Boys Outa Jail (Version)" (Neville Staples AKA Judge Roughneck)	Staples	4:07
15.	"Ghost Town" (The Specials)	Dammers	3:40
16.	"Why?" (The Specials)	Golding	2:55
17.	"Friday Night, Saturday Morning" (The Specials)	Hall	3:34
18.	"Concrete Jungle (Live)" (The Specials)	Radiation	3:07
19.	"Racquel" (The Special AKA)	Dammers	1:59

=== Disc 2 ===
No.	Title	Writer(s)	Length
1.	"The Boiler" (Rhoda with The Special AKA) (Featuring Rhoda Dakar and Nicky Summers of The Bodysnatchers, with a song originally written by The Bodysnatchers)	Joyce, Leyton, Summers, Summers, Dakar, Barker, Owens	5:46
2.	"Theme from the Boiler" (Rhoda with The Special AKA) (Featuring Rhoda Dakar and Nicky Summers of The Bodysnatchers)	Joyce, Leyton, Summers, Summers, Dakar, Barker, Owens	4:12
3.	"Jungle Music" (Rico & The Special AKA)	Rodriguez	4:00
4.	"Rasta Call You" (Rico & The Special AKA)	Rodriguez	3:36
5.	"Easter Island" (Rico & The Special AKA)	Wattanobe	4:10
6.	"War Crimes (The Crime Remains the Same) (Single Version)" (The Special AKA)	Dammers	4:00
7.	"War Crimes (The Crime Remains the Same) (Version)" (The Special AKA)	Dammers	3:44
8.	"Racist Friend" (The Special AKA)	Dammers, Campbell, Bradbury	4:02
9.	"Bright Lights" (The Special AKA)	Dammers, Campbell, Cuthell, Bradbury	3:46
10.	"Nelson Mandela" (The Special AKA)	Dammers	4:12
11.	"Break Down The Door" (The Special AKA)	Dakar, The Special AKA	3:49
12.	"What I Like Most About You Is Your Girlfriend" (The Special AKA)	Dammers	4:05
13.	"Can't Get A Break" (The Special AKA)	Dammers, Campbell, Bradbury	4:56
14.	"Nelson Mandela '88 (Special 70th Birthday Remake)" (The Special AKA featuring Ndonka Khuze and Jonas Gwangwa)	Dammers, Khuze, Gwangwa	4:46
15.	"Ghost Dub '91" (The Specials)	Dammers	4:19
16.	"Let Us Unite" (The Specials)	Dammers	4:28

=== Disc 3 ===
No.	Title	Writer(s)	Length
1.	"Ghost Town (Extended Version)" (The Specials)	Dammers	6:02
2.	"Why? (Extended Version)" (The Specials)	Golding	3:55
3.	"War Crimes (The Crime Remains the Same)" (The Special AKA)	Dammers	6:09
4.	"Racist Friend (Instrumental)" (The Special AKA)	Dammers, Campbell, Bradbury	4:09
5.	"Bright Lights (Instrumental)" (The Special AKA)	Dammers, Campbell, Cuthell, Bradbury	4:40
6.	"Nelson Mandela (Extended Version)" (The Special AKA)	Dammers	4:34
7.	"Break Down The Door (Extended Version)" (The Special AKA)	Dakar, The Special AKA	5:01
8.	"What I Like Most About You Is Your Girlfriend (Extended Version)" (The Special AKA)	Dammers	5:22
9.	"Can't Get A Break (Extended Version)" (The Special AKA)	Dammers, Campbell, Bradbury	6:29
10.	"Nelson Mandela '88 (The Whole World Is Watching Dance Mix)" (The Special AKA featuring Ndonka Khuze and Jonas Gwangwa)	Dammers	8:27
11.	"Ghost Dub '91/Let Us Unite" (The Specials)	Dammers	6:36
