= Glory Hallelujah =

Glory Hallelujah may refer to:

- Part of the phrase "Glory, glory, hallelujah", notably used in:
  - The Battle Hymn of the Republic
  - "John Brown's Body"
  - "Glory, Glory (Lay My Burden Down)"
- A phrase common in camp meeting hymns
- "Glory Hallelujah", a 1963 song by Rico Rodriguez
- "Glory Hallelujah", a song from the 2002 O.C. Supertones album Hi-Fi Revival
- "Glory Hallelujah", a 2004 song by Danny Brooks
- "Glory Hallelujah", a 2005 song by Darrel Petties
- "Glory Hallelujah" and Glory Hallelujah – EP, a 2005 single and EP by Polly Scattergood
- "Glory Hallelujah", a song from the 2011 Frank Turner album England Keep My Bones
  - A 2020 cover by NOFX on the split album West Coast vs. Wessex
