= Rico Rodriguez discography =

Rico Rodriguez discography:

== 1958 to 1961 ==
=== Singles/single sides ===
All tracks recorded in Jamaica before 1962 (and Rico's departure for England). It is possible that some recording sessions included Don Drummond and Rico Rodriguez on trombone (cf. photo on the Heartbeat CD Ska Bonanza).

==== Lloyd Daley Productions ====
- Neville Esson: "Miss Ann" - released on 7"-side: Matador, pre 1960
- Neville Esson: "Shimmy And Twist" - released on 7"-side: Matador, pre 1960
- Matador All-Stars feat. Rolando Alphonso: "Bridgeview Shuffle" - released on 7"-side: Matador pre (?), ca. 1959; re-issued on 7"-side: Doctor Bird DB /UK, 1969
- Matador All-Stars feat. Rico Rodriguez: "Continental Shuffle" - re-released on: 7"-side: Doctor Bird DB 1177-B /UK, 1969

All four tracks rec. ca. 1959, first used as dubplates and later released as 7"-sides, partly with blank labels; re-released in 1994: It's Shuffle 'n Ska Time with Lloyd "The Matador" Daley (CD: Jamaican Gold /NL)

- Bell's Group (a.k.a. Prince Buster & The All Stars: "Scott Rock" - Beverley's FM 101 /Jamaica, 1961

==== Dada Tuari Productions ====
- "Four Star Shuffle" - released on 7"-side: Downbeat M8OW 2970 /Jamaica, 1965 (???)
- "Omara Special" - released on 7"-side: Downbeat M8OW 2972 /Jamaica, 1966 (???)
- Cedric Bravo & Rico: "Merry Christmas" - released on 7"-side: Downbeat M80W 2967-1 /Jamaica
- Cedric Bravo: "Sugar Baby" - released on 7"-side: Downbeat M80W 2969
- Laurel Aitken: "Jeannie's Back" - released on: 7"-side: Regal RG001; released as: Laurel Aitken: "Jeannie Is Back" b/w "If It's Money You Need" (7": Blue Beat 010 /UK); recorded ca. 1960

==== Coxsone Dodd Productions ====
- Rico Rodriguez: "Moonlight Cha Cha" - rec. ca. 1960/61; unknown release
- Aubrey Adams & Rico Rodriguez: "Stew Peas And Cornflakes" - released on 7"-side: All Stars /JA, 1961; issued on: V.A.: All Star Top Hits (LP: Coxsone's Records /JA, ca. 1961); V.A.: Ska Bonanza (2CD: Heartbeat, 1991)
- Laurel Aitken: "Mash Potatoe Boogie" - released as: Laurel Aitken The Blue Beats: "Bar Tender" b/w "Mash Potato Boogie" (7": Blue Beat BB 40 /UK); released as 7"-side: Starline DA 3153 /Ja; Alain Salvi 2004 and Turner/Schoenfeld 2002, p. 8 give production credits to L. Aitken; on the Blue Beat issue the track is credited to producer Dodd.]
- Roland (Alphonso) with Clue J & His Blues Blasters: "Proof Rum" - recorded ca. ca. 1958; released on: 7"-side: Woldisc /JA; re-released on: Roland Alphonso: Something Special (CD: Heartbeat, 2000)
- Rolando (Alphonso) & His Group: "Federal Special" - released on 7"-side: ND, ca. 1961; released on 7"-side: R&B JB 122-A /UK, 1963; re-released on: Roland Alphonso: Something Special (CD: Heartbeat, 2000)
- Rolando Alphonso: "Cuban Blockade" - released on 7"-side; released on 7"-side: Island WI 66 /UK, 1963; re-issued on 7"-side: Coxsone FC 3072 /US, 1990s
- Theophilus Beckford: "Easy Snapping" - rec. 1956; released on 7"-side: Worldisc KD 45110 /JA, ca.1959/1960; released on 7"-side: Blue Beat BB 015 /UK, 1962; several re-issues and re-recordings
- Theophilus Beckford: "Jack & Jill Shuffle" - released on 7"-side: Blue Beat BB 033-A /UK
- Theophilus Beckford: "Tell Me Little Lady", or: "Little Lady" - released on 7"-side: All Stars FDR 565 /Ja; 7"-side: Blue Beat BB 033-B /UK, 1962
- The Blues Busters: "Why Did I Worry" - no details available
- Brownie & His Drummers: "Sliders", a.k.a. Clue J & His Blues Blasters: "The Slider" - recorded ca. 1961, released on: 7"-side: Coxsone FC 182 /Jamaica, re-issued ca. 2001 (?)
- Busty & Cool: "What A World" - released as: Busty & Cool: Mr. Policeman b/w What A World (7": DDarling FC-2116/FC-2117 /JA; 7": Blue Beat BB-144 /UK), released 1962, rec. ca. 1961; re-released on: V.A.: Sir Coxsone and Duke Reid in Concert At Forrester's Hall (Downbeat Clash With The Trojan) (LP/CD: Studio 1 SOTL 010 /US); Busty & Cool are Bunny & Skitter are Busty Brown & Cool Sticky
- Lord Bryn(n)er: "Teach Me To Ska" (or: "Teach The Ska") - released on: 7"-side: C&N FC 3098 /JA, 1964; Lord Brynner & Sheiks: "Congo War" b/w Lord Brynner & Sheiks: "Teach Me To Ska" (7": Island WI 266 /UK, 1966)
- Cornell Campbell: "Don't Want Your Loving"
- Clue J & His Blues Blasters: "Grandnational" - released on: 7"-side: All Stars FC 108, ca. 1961
- Clue J & The Blues Blasters: "Silky" - released on 7"-side: Worldisc CR 133 /JA, 1961; 7"-side: Blue Beat BB 17-B /UK
- Clue J & His Blues Blasters: "Salt Lane Shuffle" - released on 7"-side ?; issued on: V.A.: All Star Top Hits (LP: Coxsone's Records /JA, ca. 1961); V.A.: Ska Bonanza (2CD: Heartbeat, 1991)
- Clue J & His Blues Blasters: "Shufflin' Jug" - released on: 7"-side: Worldisc KD 45112, 1959 (?), 1961 /JA
- Clue J & His Blues Blasters: "Pine Juice" - released on: 7"-side: All Stars/Coxsone FDR 561, 1960; and 7"-side: Blue Beat BB 060-B /UK, ca. 1962; re-released on: 7": Studio 1 FDR 561 /Jamaica, 1970s
- Clue J & His Blues Blasters: "Milk Lane Hop" - released on: 7"-side: Coxsone FC 123 /JA, 1961; re-issued as: Johnny Moore, Bobby Gaynor & Rico with Clue J & His Blues Blasters: "Milk Lane Hop" on: V.A.: Sir Coxsone and Duke Reid in Concert At Forrester's Hall (Downbeat Clash With The Trojan) (LP/CD: Studio 1 SOTL 010 /US)
- Clue J & His Blues Blasters feat. Bunny & Skitter: "Cherry" - released on 7"-side: Worldisc KD 45 105 /Jamaica, 1959
- Clue J & His Blues Blasters feat. Bunny & Skitter: "King Spinner" - released on 7"-side: Worldisc KD 45 106 /Jamaica
- Count P Allstars: "Sand Lane Shuffle" - re-released on 7"-side: Collector's Series/S.O. World CP 0010-A /US, 2000s
- Count P Allstars: "Loving Arms" - re-released on 7"-side: Collector's Series/S.O. World CP 0010-B /US, 2000s
- Dewdroppers : "Margie" (or: "Marjie") - released on: 7"-side: All Stars CR 006 /JA, ca. 1961; re-issued on 7"-side: Ackee ACK 146-B /UK, 1972; are: Clue J & His Blues Blasters
- Don Drummond with His Group: "Don Cosmic" - rec. ca. 1960; re-issued on 7"-side: Studio 1 DSR 9908 /Jamaica, 1980s; (with Rico, with overdubs and remixed, cf. Salvi 2005)
- Don Drummond with His Group: "Don Cosmic Pt. 2" - re-issued on 7"-side: Studio 1 DSR 9909 /Jamaica, 1980s; (w/ Rico; w/overdubs; cf. Salvi 2005); it is not confirmed if Rico played on the original versions
- Clancy Eccles: "Glory Hallelujah" - released on: 7"-side: Rolando & Powie FC 2288 /JA, 1963; 7"-side: Island WI 098-A /UK
- Neville Esson [with Clue J & His Blues Blasters]: "Lovers Jive" - released on 7"-side: Blue Beat BB 037-A /UK
- Neville Esson [with Clue J. & His Blues Blasters]: "Wicked And Dreadful" - released on 7"-side: Worldisc CD 121 /JA, 1960; 7"-side: Blue Beat BB 37-B /UK; re-released on: 7"-side: Coxsone CR 121 /JA, 200?
- Owen Gray with Clue J and his Blues Blasters: "Jezebel" - released on: 7"-side: DDarling FC 2065-3 /JA, 1962; 7"-side: Island WI 014-B /UK; according to Rico Rodriguez it's not him but either Don Drummond or a trombonist he calls "Molo"
- Derrick Harriott: "Answer Me My Darling" - no information available.
- Jiving Juniors: "Over The River" - released on 7"-side: All Stars FC 117 /JA, 1961; released on 7"-side as Jiving Juniors w/ Hersang & His City Slickers (Blue Beat BB 36-A /UK); issued on: V.A.: All Star Top Hits (LP: Coxsone's Records /JA, ca. 1961); V.A.: Ska Bonanza (2CD: Heartbeat, 1991); Rico remembered this as his first ever recording session in an interview with Reggaefrance.com in 2004. This seems not to be correct or the session was earlier than mentioned in various sources with the period around 1959/1960.
- Jiving Juniors: "I'll Be There" - released on: 7"-side: Iron Side FC 2160-2 /JA, 1962
- Mellow Cats & Count Ossie: "Rockaman Soul" - released on: 7"-side: All Stars FC 150 /JA, 1961; released as: Mellow Cats + Count Ossie & The Warrikas: "Rockaman Soul" b/w Monty Alexander & Cyclones: "Lazy Lou" (7": Blue Beat BB 68 /UK, 1961); reissue on: 7"-side: The Mellow Cats: "Rock a Man Soul" (7": Collector's Series/S.O. World /US, ca. 2000)
- Mellow Larks: "Time To Pray" - released on: 7"-side: Worldisc CR 122 /JA, 1960; 7"-side: Blue Beat BB 16-A /UK; re-issued on: Supreme SUP 201-A /UK, 1969; Winro CN 2322-A /US, 1970: note: w/ Clue J & His Blues Blasters
- Mellow Larks: "Love You Baby" - released on: 7"-side: Worldisc CR 123 /JA, 1960, reissue: 1980s(?); 7"-side: Blue Beat BB 16-B /UK; note: w/ Clue J & His Blues Blasters
- Derrick Morgan & Clue J & His Blues Blasters: "Leave Earth" - released on: 7"-side: Coxsone FC 101 /JA, 1961: 7"-side: Blue Beat BB 35-A /UK
- Lascelles Perkins: "Lonely Robin" - released on: 7"-side: Worldisc CR 128 /JA; and as: Lascelles Perkins And Clue J & His Blues Blasters: "Creation" b/w "Lonely Robin" (7": Blue Beat BB 41 /UK), 1961
- Lascalles Perkins: "Mighty Organ" - re-released as: 7"-side: Lascalles Perkins, feat. Dimples: Mighty Organ (Coxsone FC 190 /US); Rico's participation is not sure
- The Rhythm Aces feat. Winston & Bibby: "I'll Be There" - released on 7"-side: Blue Beat BB 134-A, 1962; re-released on 7"-side: Iron Side IS 024-B/FC 2160 /JA, 1973
- George Richards w/ Clue J & His Blues Blasters: "Romeo" - rec. ca. 1959; reissued on 7"-side: Coxsone KD 45-109 /US, ca. 2000+
- Roy & Millie: "This World" - released on 7"-side: Island WI 050-A /UK
- B.B. Seaton: "Only You" - recorded 1959; re-released on 7"-side: Coxsone FC 2264 /US
- Winston & Barbara: "I Love You" - released on 7"-side: Black Swan /Island WI 418-B, 1964; re-released on 7"-side: Studio 1 CD 23 /US, ca. 2000+; Rico's participation is not certain; officially this side was recorded in 1963?!

==== Duke Reid Productions ====
- "Blues From The Hills" - released on 7"-side: Duke Reid's /JA; released as: Reco & His Blues Band: Blues From The Hills b/w The Stranger: Miss Reamer (7": Blue Beat BB 195 /UK, 1963)
- "Let George Do It" - recorded ca. 1961 but not released; later released by Duke Reid as a Don *Laurel Aitken: "Yea Yea Baby" - released as: Laurel Aitken: Yea Yea Baby b/w Judgement Day (7": Blue Beat BB 14 /UK), ca. 1960
- Laurel Aitken: "Judgement Day" - released on: 7"-side: Duke Reid's RR 150 /JA, ca. 1960; released as: Laurel Aitken: "Yea Yea Baby" b/w "Judgement Day" (7": Blue Beat BB 14 /UK), ca. 1960; re-released on Laurel Aitken: The Pioneer Of Jamaican Music (CD: Reggae Retro), 2000
- Laurel Aitken: "Daniel Saw The Stone" - released on: 7"-side: Blue Beat BB194-B /UK, 1963; re-released on: Laurel Aitken: It's Too Late. The Legendary Godfather Of Ska, Vol. 2 - Personal Selections 1961-1984 (LP: Unicorn PHZA 53 /UK), 1989; re-released in 2001 on: Laurel Aitken: Rise And Fall (The Legendary Godfather Of Ska, Volume 4) (CD: Grover GRO 055 /D)
- Laurel Aitken/Ruddy & Sketto with Rico's Group: "Zion" - released on: Laurel Aitken: "Zion" b/w "Swing Low Sweet Chariot" (7": Blue Beat BB 164
- Roland Alphonso & His Group: "Blackberry Brandy" - released on 7"-side: Blue Beat BB 058-A /UK
- Roland Alphonso's Group: "Green Door" - released on 7"-side: Blue Beat BB 063-B /UK
- Roland Alphonso Group, feat. Tommy McCook with Duke Reid's Group: "Yard Broom" - released on 7"-side: Ska Beat/R&B JB 183-B /UK, 1965
- The Bandits, feat. Laurel Aitken: "Jenny Jenny" - released on: 7": Blue Beat BB 142-B /UK, recorded ca. 1962; re-released on Laurel Aitken: Godfather Of Ska (The Legendary Godfather Of Ska Volume 3: 1963-1966) (CD: Grover GRO 039 /D; CD: Gaz's Rockin' CD GAZ /UK)
- Chuck & Dobby w/ Duke Reid's Group: "Oh Fanny" - released on 7"-side: Blue Beat BB 059-A /UK; (are Chuck Joseph and Dobby Dobson)
- Drumbago All Stars: "Duck Soup" - released on: 7"-side: Duke Reid's FRS 141, 1962; released as: Drumbago All Stars: "Duck Soup" b/w Derrick Morgan: "Love Not To Brag" (7": Blue Beat BB 97 /UK), ca. 1962; re-released on V.A.: Independent Jamaica 1962 (CD: Trojan), 2002
- Rico Rodriguez, Roland Alphonso & Dizzy Moore: "Magic" - re-released on: V.A.: Knock Out Ska (Treasure Isle /Heartbeat /US), 2001; re-released on: Rico Rodriguez: Trombone Man (2CD: Trojan), 2004, credited to Duke Reid's All Stars
- Derrick Morgan: "Lover Boy" - rec. ca. 1959, during Duke Reid's first session for release on 7" records; released on: 7"-side: Duke Reid's RR 155 /JA, 1960; released as: Derrick Morgan & Duke's Group: "Lover Boy" b/w "Oh My" (7": Blue Beat BB 18 /UK), 1960/61; re-released on: Derrick Morgan: Time Marches On (CD: Heartbeat), 1997
- Derrick Morgan: "You're a Pest" - re-released on: Derrick Morgan: Time Marches On (CD: Heartbeat), 1997
- Derrick Morgan: "Love Not To Brag" - rec. ca. 1960; released on: 7"-side: Dutchess FRS 2056 /JA, 1962; released as: Drumbago All Stars: Duck Soup b/w Derrick & Patsy: Love Not To Brag (7": Blue Beat BB 97), ca. 1961; re-released on: Derrick Morgan: Time Marches On (CD: Heartbeat /US), 1997
- Duke Reid & His Group: "The Joker" - released on 7"-side: Blue Beat BB 023-B /UK, 1960
- Duke Reid & His Group: "Pink Lane Shuffle" - recorded 1960; issued on Duke Reid RR 159, ca. 1960; re-issued on 7"-side: Duke DK 1002-A /UK, ca. 1960s; re-issued on 7"-side: Treasure Isle/Coxsone's TS 030-B /US
- Lloyd Flowers (a.k.a. Robinson): "I'm Going Home" b/w "Lovers Town" - released on 7": Blue Beat BB 088 /UK, 1962
- Lloyd Robinson And Reco's Group: "Give Me A Chance" b/w "When You Walk" - released on 7": Duke Reid's FRS 6179/6180 /JA; 7": Blue Beat BB 122 /UK; "When You Walk" is re-released in 2002 on V.A.: Independent Jamaica 1962 (CD: Trojan)

Re-issue of unspecified tracks featuring Rico may be found on

- V.A.: Mark Lamarr presents Duke Reid's Nuklear Weapon (CD: Trojan TJCCD 090 /UK), 2004

==== Vincent Chin Productions ====
All tracks recorded in 1961.

- "Rico's Special" - released as: Orch. feat. Rico: Rico Special and Rico Rodriquez: Rico's Special, both on 7"-side: Randy's 45 CR-62-6 /JA; re-issued on: The Rough Guide to Ska (CD), 2003
- "Reco's Farewell" (or: "Rico's Farewell") - released as: Reco & Happy: "Reco's Farewell" b/w Skitter: "A Little Mashin" (7": Island WI 022 /UK); re-issue auf Sampler: V.A.: Skatalites And Friends (CD: VP Records, /US), 1998; re-issued on: The Rough Guide to Ska (CD), 2003
- Rico Rodriguez & Johnny Moore: "Smoothe Twisting" - released on 7"-side: Randy's 45 CD 61-8 /JA
- Rico & Group: (Instrumental of unknown title) - released on: 7"-side: Randy's Pre 45 CR 61-11 /JA
- Rico & Group: (instrumental of unknown title) - released on: 7"-side: Randy's Pre 45 CR 61-12 /JA
- Alton & Eddie: "Let Me Dream" - released on 7"-side: Randy's 45 CR 62-4 /Jamaica; 7"-side: Island WI 009-B /UK; (are Alton Ellis & Eddie Perkins)
- Kentrick Patrick: "Man To Man" - released on 7"-side: Island WI 066-A/UK, 1963; (is Lord Creator); Rico's presence is not certain
- Bobby Gaynair/Rico Rodriguez/Dizzy Johnny/Richard Ace: "Blockade" - released on 7"-side: Randy's /JA; released on 7"-side as: Roland Alphonso: "Blockade" (Island WI 066-B /UK, 1963); re-issued on: The Rough Guide to Ska (CD), 2003
- Bunny & Skitter: "A Little Mashin'" - released on 7"-side: Randy's 45 CR 61-1 /JA; released as: Reco & Happy: "Reco's Farewell" b/w Bunny & Skitter: "A Little Mashin'" (7": Island WI 022 /UK), 1962
- Bunny & Skitter: "Leave Out Babylon" - released as: "Leaving Babylon" on: 7"-side Randy's 45 CR 61-2 /JA
- Basil Gabbidon: "Going Back To JA" (also titled "Going Back To Jamaica") - released as 7"-side: Randy's /JA; released on Basil Gabbidon/Randy's All Stars: "Our Melody" b/w "Going Back To J.A.". A "Randy" Recording (7": Blue Beat BB 129 /UK), 1962
- V. Forster Orchestra feat. Rico: "Lightning Street" - released on: 7"-side: Randy's 45 CR 61-3 /JA
- King Joe & Africans Drums: "Bam Mo She" - released on 7"-side: Randy's 45 CR 61-7 /JA
- King Joe & Africans Drums: "Jumping" - released on 7"-side: Randy's 45 CR 61-8 /JA; (is King Joe Francis)

==== Prince Buster Productions ====
- Rico: "Luke Lane Shuffle" - released on: 7"-side: Buster Wild Bells -ZSP 52835-1A /JA; 7"side: Blue Beat BB 56-A /UK
- Prince Buster's Group: "Little Honey" - released as 7"-side Buster Wild Bells -ZSP 52835-1A /JA; 7"-side: Blue Beat BB 56-B /UK, 1961
- Bell's Group (Prince Buster & The All Stars): "Kingston 13" - released as 7"-side: Blue Beat BB 100-B; released as: Bell's Group: "Kingston 13" on: 7"-side: President FM 2047 /JA; 7"-side: President FM 3025 /JA; Derrick Morgan: In My Heart bw/ Bell's Group: Kingston 13 (7": Blue Beat BB 100 /UK), all released in 1962; re-issue 7"-side: Prince Buster 3025 /US, year unknown; V.A.: 15 Oldies But Goodies (You Asked For Them Here They Are) (LP: Prince Buster MS 4 /Jamaica, 200?); prod. credits: Count Bells (cf. Turner/Schoenfeld, 2002)
- Buster's Group: "Poison On Beeston Street" (instrumental) - released on 7"-side: Buster Wild Bells ZSP 53472 /Jamaica
- Buster's Group: "Please Mr. Sun" (instrumental) - released on 7"-side: Buster Wild Bells ZSP 53486 /Jamaica
- Lloyd Flowers And Rico's Rhythms: "Lovers Town" b/w "I'm Going Home" - released on 7": Blue Beat BB 88 /UK, 1962
- Errol Dixon: "Morning Train" - released on 7"-side: Starline 45 DA 3139 /JA, re-issue: 7": Blue Beat BB 27, 1960 /UK; Rico's participation on the b-side (Errol Dixon: "Anytime Anywhere") is uncertain
- The Folkes Brothers: "Oh Carolina" - Rec. c. 1960; released 1961 as: The Folkes Brothers: "Oh Carolina" b/w "I Met A Man", (7": Buster Wild Bells ZSP 52834-1A/ZSP 52833-1A /JA; and: The Folks Brothers/Count Ossie Afro-Combo: "Carolina" b/w "I Met A Man" (7": Blue Beat BB 30 /UK). - Even if there is no trombone to hear Rico told to Klaus Frederking, that he played on this and on most of the records with Count Ossie (maybe he played here a rasta/funda drum?!, see also the Harry Mudie productions below).
- Owen Gray & Buster's Group: "On The Beach" - released on 7"-side: Dice CC 03-A /UK

==== Harry Mudie Productions ====
- Roy Ashmeade: "Knocking On My Door" - re-released on: Harry A. Mudie: Reggae History Volume 1 (A-Z) (LP: Moods International HM 116 /US), 1985
- Roy Ashmed: "Circuit Trial" - re-released on 7"-side: Moodisc HM 109 /US, ca. 2000s
- Bunny & Skitta with Count Ossie: "Cool Breeze" - released on: Coxsone FC 183 /JA, 1961 (officially prod. by C.S. Dodd)
- Winston & Roy: "Babylon Gone" b/w "First Gone" - credited to Winston & Roy with Count Ossie and released on: 7"-side: Moodisc FXM 101 / FXM 102 /JA; and as: Winston & Roy/Count Ossie On The African Drums: "Babylon Gone" b/w Count Ossie featuring Rico: "First Gone", A "Moodisc" Recording (7": Blue Beat BB 80 /UK), 1962; re-released on 7"-side: Moodisc HM 102 /US, 2000s
- Count Ossie & The African Drums: "African Shuffle" - this could be Ossie's "Air Horn Shuffle", as Roots Knotty Roots indicate that "African Shuffle" is synonymous with "Fire Escape"
- Count Ossie & The African Drums: "Swinging For Joy" - released on 7"-side: Gas 109-B /UK, 1969; re-released as Count Ossie & The Warrikas on 7"-side: Moodisc FHM 7749 /US, ca. 2000s
- Count Ossie: "Air Horn Shuffle" - released on: 7"-side: Moodisc /JA, year unknown
- Count Ossie: "Music Go Round And Round" - released on: 7"-side: Moodisc /JA, year unknown; re-released on 7"-side: Moodisc FXM 107-B /US, 2000s
- Rico & Count Ossie: "Fire Escape" - released as: "Fire Escape (African Shuffle)" (7"-side: Moodisc FXM 110 /JA); re-released on 7"-side: Moodisc HM 110-A /US, ca. 2000+
- Count Ossie: "Going Home To Zion Land" - re-released as Count Ossie & The Wareikas, feat. Winston & Roy on 7"-side: Modisc FHM 101-B /US, 2000s
- Rico & Count Ossie: "Count Ossie Special" - released as: Count Ossie Special (7"-side: Moodisc Pre FXM 105 /JA); re-released on 7"-side: Moodisc FXM 105, ca. 2000+
- Count Ossie: "Serve Him And Live" - released as: Winston & Roy with Count Ossie: Serve Him And Live (7"-side: Moodisc FXM 107 /JA), 1961; re-issued as Count Ossie & The Wareikas with Winston & Roy on 7"-side Moodisc FXM 107-A /US, 2000s
- Count Ossie: "Herb I Feel" - released as: Count Ossie & His African Drums: "Herb I Feel (Music I Feel)" (7"-side: Moodisc FHM 7666 /JA), 1969
- Count Ossie: "I Would Give My Life" - released on 7"-side Moodisc /JA
- Count Ossie & The Warrikas: "So Long" - released as Winston & Roy with Count Ossie: "So Long Negus Call" (7"-side Moodisc pre FXM 106 /JA), 1961
- Winston: "Gun Fever"
- Winston: "Hello Sharon"
- Winston: "Leaving This Land"
- Winston & Roy: "One Bright Morning" - re-released as Count Ossie & The Wareikas, feat. Winston & Roy on 7"-side: Moodisc FHM 7749-B /UK, 2000s
- Winston & Roy: "Sodom & Gomorrah" - re-released as Count Ossie & The Wareikas, feat. Winston & Roy on 7"-side: Moodisc HM 110-B US, 2000s

Most of the tracks have been re-released on: Harry Mudie: Remembering Count Ossie: A Rasta Reggae Legend (CD), 1996

==== Various producers ====
- Instrumental of unknown title (shuffle) - released on 7"-side: blank -FSP 2133- /JA; Prod. by Count P; (ref.: Turner/Schoenfeld 2003, p. 377, Salvi 2005)
- Rico Rodriguez: "Jumping with The Beat" - Prod. by Charlie Moo; released on Moo's FMO 108 (place and year unknown)
- Rico Rodriguez & Johnny Moore: "Freeman Lane Shuffle" - Prod. by Charlie Moo; released ca. 1960?, details unknown
- Rico Rodriguez & Johnny Moore: "Saint Shuffle" - unknown producer; released on blank label, Matrix-No. FXB 2109 /JA
- Laurel Aitken: "Mash Potato Boogie" - Prod.by Laurel Aitken; released on 7"-side: Blue Beat BB 040-B /UK
- Laurel Aitken: "Bouncing Woman" - Prod. by Melodisc (Turner/Schoenfeld 2003, p. 6); released as: 7"-side: Starline DA 3149 /JA; released on: Laurel Aitken & The Blue Beats: "Nursery Rhyme Boogie" b/w "Bouncing Woman" (7": Blue Beat BB 52 /UK)
- Laurel Aitken: "Zion City Wall" - Prod. by Leslie Kong; released on: Laurel Aitken: "What A Weeping" b/w "Zion City Wall" (7": Island WI 095 /UK)
- Kent Brown: "Hey Diddle Diddle" - Prod. by D.E.Dunkley; released as K.Brown With Sir D's Group on 7"-side: Blue Beat BB 066-A /UK
- Cecil Byrd & Sir D's Group: "Ba Ba Black Sheep" - released on 7"-side: Dee's FXD 101 /Jamaica, 1961; released on 7"-side: Blue Beat BB 049-A /UK, 1961
- C. Byrd with Dee's Group: "Pharaoh" - released on 7"-side: Dee's FXD 112-A /Jamaica, 1963
- Owen Gray: "Midnight Track" - Prod. by Charley Moo; released as 7"-side on: Moo's /JA; 7": Owen Gray: "Midnight Track" b/w "Time Will Tell" (7": Island WI 030 /UK), 1962
- Higgs And Wilson: "Manny Oh" - Prod. by Edward Seaga; released as 7"-side: Wirl /JA; and as: Higgs & Wilson & Ken Richards Comets: "Manny Oh" b/w "When You Tell Me Baby" (7": Blue Beat BB 3 /UK), 1960

== 1962 ==
Rico Rodriguez came to the UK at the end of 1961. He settled in London and started recording under his own name and as a session player.

=== Singles/single sides ===
==== Planetone / Sonny Roberts Productions ====
- Rico's Combo: "Midnight In Ethiopia" - released as 7"-side: Planetone RC-1A /UK
- Rico's Combo: "London Here I Come" - released as 7"-side: Planetone RC-1B /UK; re-released on: Rico Rodriguez: Trombone Man (2CD: Trojan), 2004
- Rico's Combo: "You Win" - released as 7"-side: Planetone RC 4-B /UK
- Rico's Combo: "Youth Boogie" b/w "Planet Rock" - released as: 7": Planetone RC-5 /UK; "Youth Boogie" was re-issued on: V.A. Tighten Up (free CD with the book of the same title by Michael de Koningh & Marc Griffiths), 2003; Intoxica offered Planetone RC-5 as: Rico's Combo: "Youth Brigade" b/w "Western Serenade" (11.2.2006)
- Rico's Combo: "Gees Boogie" - released as 7"-side: Planetone RC-6A /UK
- Rico's Combo: "Hitch And Scramble" - released as 7"-side: Planetone RC-6B /UK; re-released on: Rico Rodriguez: Trombone Man (2CD: Trojan), 2004
- Dimples & Eddie with Rico's Group: "Fleet Street" - released on 7"-side: Planetone RC 3-A / PLA 16 /UK

==== Other producers ====
- Laurel Aitken: "Back To New Orleans" - Prod. by Lautel Aitken (Turner/Schoenfeld 2002, p. 6)

released on 7"-side: Starline DA 3155-2 /Ja; released as: Laurel Aitken The Blue Beats: "Brother David" b/w "Back To New Orleans" (7": Blue Beat BB 84 /UK); re-issued on: Laurel Aitken: The Legendary Godfather Of Ska Vol. 4: Rise And Fall (CD: Grover, 2001)

- Laurel Aitken: "Going [Back] To Kansas City" - released as: Laurel Aitken / Les Dawson Combo: "Sixty Days And Sixty Nights" b/w "Going To Kansas City" (7": Blue Beat BB 120 /UK, 1962)
- Ruddy And Skette + Reco's All Stars: "Summer Is Just Around The Corner" b/w "Nothing But Time" - released as 7": Dice Records CC 5 /UK
- Ruddy & Sketto With Laurel Aitken Band: "Mr. Postman" - Prod. by Siggy Jackson; released on 7"-side: Dice CC 10-A /UK
- Ruddy & Sketto with Laurel Aitken Band: "Christmas Blues" - Prod. by Siggy Jackson; released on 7"-side: Dice CC 10-B /UK
- Ruddy & Sketto with Baron Twist & His Knights: "Please Enid" - released on 7"-side: Dice CC 2-B /UK
- Ruddy & Sketto w/ Baron Twist & His Knights: "Little Schoolgirl" - released on 7"-side: Dice CC 7-A /UK
- Ruddy & Sketto with Baron Twist & His Knights: "Hush Baby" - released on 7"-side: Dice CC 7-B /UK
- Clive Bailey & Rico's Blues Group: "Evening Train" b/w "Take Me Home" - A Melodisc Production, 1962; released as 7": Blue Beat BB 92 /UK
- Lloyd Clarke And Reco's All Stars: F"ools Day" b/w Lloyd Clarke with The Smith's Sextett: "You're A Cheat" - Prod.: Simeon L. Smith; released on 7": Blue Beat BB 104 /UK
- Prince Buster And The Blue Beats: "Independence Song" b/w Rico And The Blue Beats: "August 1962" - A "Buster" Recording, 1962; released as: 7": Blue Beat BB 116

== 1963 ==
=== Prince Buster productions ===
- "This Day" - released as 7"-side: Prince Buster VOP /JA; released on: Prince Buster: "Rolling Stones" b/w Reco And His Blues Band: "This Day" (7": Blue Beat BB 192 /UK)
- "Soul Of Africa" - released on: Prince Buster: "Wash All Your Troubles Away" b/w Rico & The Blue Boys: "Soul Of Africa" (7": Blue Beat BB 200 /UK, 1963); released as Rico & The Blue Beats: "Soul Of Africa" on 7"-side: Blue Beat BB 210 /UK, 1964; also released on 7"-side: Buster Wild Bells /JA; re-released on: Prince Buster: The Prophet (It's Pure Soul) (CD/LP?: Lagoon /Esoldun LG 1100 /F)
- Rico's All Stars/Prince Buster All Stars: "Buster's Welcome" - released on 7"-side: Blue Beat BB 167-B
- Prince Buster & The Blue Beats (w/ Les Dawson Blues Unit): "Wash All Your Troubles Away" - released on 7": Blue Beat BB 200 /UK, 1963; released on 7"-side: Blue Beat BB 210 /UK, 1964

==== Other producers ====
- Laurel Aitken: "Sweet Jamaica" - released on 7"-side: Dice CC 13-A /UK; re-released on: Laurel Aitken: It's Too Late. The Legendary Godfather Of Ska, Vol. 2 - Personal Selections 1961-1984 (LP: Unicorn PHZA 53 /UK, 1989); re-released on: Laurel Aitken: Rise And Fall (The Legendary Godfather Of Ska, Volume 4) (CD: Grover GRO 055 /D, 2001)
- Laurel Aitken with Rico's Group: "Bossa Nova Hop" - released on 7"-side: Dice CC 13-B /UK
- Marvels & Rico Blues Band: "Sonia" b/w "The More We Are Together" (7": Blue Beat BB 191 /UK) - Prod.: Melodisc
- Al T Joe: "Slow Boat" - Prod. by Linden O. Pottinger; released on 7"-side: Blue Beat BB 169-B /UK; reissued on: V.A.: Ska Boogie Jamaican R&B The Dawn Of Ska (CD: Sequel NEX 254 /UK), 1993

== 1964 ==
=== Singles/single sides ===
- "I'll Be Home" - Prod. by Prince Buster; released on The Maytals: "Dog War" b/w Reco And The Creators: "I'll Be Home" (7": Blue Beat BB 231 /UK, 1963/64); released on 7"-side: Wildbells /JA
- Laurel Aitken: "This Great Day" - Produced by Laurel Aitken; released as: 7"-side: Blue Beat BB 249-B; re-issued on Laurel Aitken: Godfather Of Ska. Volume 3 1963-1966 (CD: Grover /D; Gaz's Rockin /UK, 2000)
- The Marvels w/ Rico & The Blue Beats: "Millie" b/w "Saturday" - released as 7": Blue Beat BB 221 /UK
- Ruddy & Sketto w/ The Bluebeats: "Show Me The Way To Go Home" b/w "Let Me Dream" - Prod. by Siggy Jackson; released as 7": Blue Beat BB 208/UK; Ruddy & Sketto are Ruddy Grant and Sketto Richards
- Ruddy & Sketto w/ Rico & The Blue Beats: "Minna I Love You" - released on 7"-side: Blue Beat BB 252-A /UK
- Ruddy & Sketto w/ Rico & The Blue Beats: "If Only Tomorrow" - released on 7"-side: Blue Beat BB 252-B /UK

== 1965 ==
=== re-issues ===
- Cedric Bravo: "Merry Christmas" b/w "Sugar Baby" - original Jamaican release on Down Beat, ca. 1960/61

== 1966 ==
=== Singles/single sides ===
- Lord Brynner & The Sheiks: "Teach Me To Ska" - Prod. by C. S. Dodd, 1964 (?); was Dodd in the UK?; Rico's overdubs in UK?; rec. earlier?; released on 7"-side: Island WI 266-B /UK
- Justin Hines & The Dominoes: "The Higher The Monkey Climbs" - Prod. by Duke Reid, was Duke Reid in the UK?; Rico's overdubs in UK?; rec. earlier?; released on 7"-side: Doctor Bird DB 1048-A /UK

== 1967 ==
After two years of low productivity caused by the demand to earn money, Rico again was frequently in the studio mainly working with Prince Buster and Siggy Jackson

=== Singles/single sides ===
- Rico Rodrecez: "Soul Man" b/w "It's Not Unusual" - Prod. by R. Rodriguez (cf. Schoenfeld, p. 377); released on 7": Pama PM 706 /UK (1967 or 1968)

==== Prince Buster Productions ====
- Prince Buster All Stars & Rico: "Bone Yard" - released as: 7"-side: Olive Blossom Wirl PB 3043-1- /JA
- "You'll Be Lonely And Blue On The Train" - released as: Prince Buster All Stars: "Sharing You" b/w Rico & His Band: "You'll Be Lonely And Blue On The Train" (7": Blue Beat BB 383 /UK); and on 7"-side: Olive Blossom /JA
- Prince Buster: "Dark End Of The Street" - released on 7"-side: Blue Beat BB 377-A /UK
- Prince Buster: "Sharing You" - released on 7"-side: Blue Beat BB 383-A /UK
- Prince Buster, feat. Lee Perry: "Judge Dread" - released on 7"-side: Blue Beat BB 387-A /UK
- Prince Buster & The All Stars: "Judge Dread Dance The Pardon" (a.k.a. "Barrister Pardon") - rec. in London, prod. by Prince Buster; released on 7"-side: Blue Beat BB 400-B /UK; released as Prince Buster & Allstars: "Judge Dread" / "City Riot" b/w "Its Burkes Law" / "Barrister Pardon" (12": Blue Beat DDPB 4 /UK); issued on LP, 1967; re-released on: Prince Buster: FABulous Greatest Hits (CD: JetStar /UK), 1993
- Prince Buster, feat. Lee Perry: "The Barrister" (a.k.a. "The Appeal"; a.k.a. "Barrister's Appeal") - released on 7"-side: Blue Beat BB 391-B /UK

==== Siggy Jackson Productions ====
- Rico & The Invaders: "Invaders At Carnival" - released on 7"-side: Columbia Blue Beat DB 109-B /UK
- Laurel Aitken's Band feat. Rico: "Blue Rhythm" - released on: 7"-side: Columbia Blue Beat DB 106-B /UK
- Laurel Aitken: "Blowing In The Wind" - released on 7"-side: Columbia Blue Beat DB 102-B
- Blue Rivers & The Maroons: "Sabu" - released on: Blue Rivers & His Maroons: Blue Beat In My Soul (LP: Bold Reprive BRM 024 /UK, 1968)
- Blue Rivers & The Maroons: "Seven Steps to Power" - released on: Blue Rivers & His Maroons: Blue Beat In My Soul (LP: Bold Reprive BRM 024 /UK, 1968); re-issue on: V.A.: The History Of Ska, Blue Beat And Reggae Vol. 2 (LP: Blue Beat /Esoldun REG 111 /F, 1991)
- Invaders: "Soul Of The Jungle" - released on 7"-side: Columbia Blue Beat DB 105-B /UK; re-released on: V.A.: The History of Ska, Blue Beat & Reggae (CD: Lagoon), 1992

==== sir collins ====
- Owen Gray: "You're So Lonely" - sir collins prod.; released on 7"-side: Collins Downbeat CR 004-A /UK
- El Reco, feat. Clancy Collins & Satch: "Shock Steady" - sir collins prod.; released on 7"-side: Collins Downbeat CR 004-B /UK
- Rico & His Boys: "Jingle Bells" b/w "Silent Night" - sir collins prod; released on 7": Fab FAB 12 /UK
- Dandy: "Rudy A Message to You" - Prod. by Robert Tompson (is: Dandy Livingston or Brother Dan); released on 7"-side: Ska Beat/R&B JB 273-A /UK
- King Joe Francis & Rico's Boys: "My Granny" b/w "Pull It Out" (7": Rainbow RAI 114 /UK)
- Doreen & All Stars: "Please Stay" b/w "Rude Girls" (7": Rainbow RAI 117 /UK) - unknown prod.; Doreen Campbell, Rico's Boys

== 1968 ==
=== Singles/single sides ===
==== Rico Rodriguez productions ====
- Reco Rodriguez: "Blue Socks" b/w "Solas Market" (7": Nu Beat NB 015 /UK) - Prod. by R. Rodriguez (cf. Schoenfeld, p. 377)
- Rico Rodrecez: "It's Not Unusual" - Prod. by Rico Rodriguez; released on 7"-side: Pama PM 706-A /UK

==== Joe Mansano productions ====
- The Rudies: "Cupid" - released on 7"-side: Blue Cat BS 109-A /UK
- "Wise Message" - released as: Rico's All Stars (or: Rico & The Rudies): "Wise Message" (7"-side: Blue Cat BS 109-B /UK)
- "Return Of The Bullet" - released as: Reco & His Rhythm Aces: "Return Of The Bullet" (7": Blue Cat BS 148-B /UK); re-issue 2002 on: V.A.: Trojan British Reggae Box Set (3CD: Trojan TJETD 070 /UK)
- "ZZ Beat" - released as: Reco & His Rhythm Aces: "ZZ Beat" (7"-side: Blue Cat BS 150-A /UK)
- "Life On Reggae Planet" - released as: Joe The Boss: "Life On Reggae Planet" (7"-side: Blue Cat BS 150-B /UK)

==== Other producers ====
- Reco Radregez: "Tenderfoot Ska" b/w "Memories" - Prod: Jeff Palmer; released on 7": Pama PM 715 /UK
- Max Romeo: "Wet Dream (ext. version)" - Prod. by Bunny Lee; released on 12"-side: Ocean /Pama OC 003-A

== 1969 ==
=== Singles/single sides ===
==== Joe Mansano productions ====
- Reco Rodriguez & His Rhythm Aces: "The Bullet" b/w "Rhythm In" - released as 7": Blue Cat BS 160 /UK; Joe Mansano recalls this single as his first ever production. It was first released on a white label and only six months later on Pama. He remembered: "...then it started to really sell. It must've been two years (selling both) underground then on top" — the "top" meaning to both West Indians and the white skinheads who were tuning into Joe's sounds by this time. "It helped me finance other sessions and bought me a new car". (From the liner notes to a re-issue CDset: Joe The Boss. The Productions of Joe Mansano by Michael de Koningh, Trojan Records 2006
- Joe's All Stars (Rico & The Rhythm Aces): "Friendly Persuasion" (as: "Hot Line") - released on 7"-side: Duke /Trokan DU 023-B /UK; 7"-side: Joe DU 023-B /UK
- Joe's All Stars feat. Rico: "Hey Jude" - released on 7"-side: Joe DU 024-B /UK
- Joe Mansano & Rico (or: Joe's all Stars feat. Rico): "Battlecry Of Biafra" - released as Joe Mansano & Rico on 7"-side: Duke/Trojan DU 28-A /UK; released as Joe's all Stars feat. Rico on 7"-side: Joe DU 28-A /UK
- Rico & Joe's All Stars (or: Joe's All Stars feat. Rico): "Funky Reggae Party Part 1" - released as: Joe Mansano & Rico on 7"-side: Duke/Trojan DU 28-B /UK; released as: Joe's All Stars feat. Rico on 7"-side: Joe DU 28-B /UK
- Joe's All Stars feat Rico: "Honky" - released on 7"-side: Duke/Trojan DU 34-B /UK; 7"-side: Joe DU 34-B
- Joe The Boss: "Skinhead Revolt" - released on 7"-side: Joe JRS 09-A /UK; DJ/instrumental track

==== Dandy Livingston productions ====
- Rico & The Rudies: "Jumping The Gun" - released on 7"-side: Trojan TR 672-B /UK (b/w Pioneers: Long Shot)
- Rico & The Rudies: "Blues" - released as The Rudies feat. Rico on 7"-side: Down Town DT 419-B /UK
- Rico & The Rudies: "Lazy Boy" - released on 7"-side: Down Town DT 420-B /UK)
- Rico & The Rudies: "Quando Quando" b/w "Reg 'A' Jeg" - released on 7": Down Town DT 417 /UK
- Dandy (Livingston): "Rudy A Message To You" (7": Trojan)

==== Other producers ====
- "A Message To You" - Prod.: Laurel Aitken; released as: Laurel Aitken: "Run Powell Run" b/w Reco: "A Message to You" (7": NuBeat NB 035 /UK)
- Rico Rodriquez: "Tribute To Don Drummond" - Prod. by Rico Rodriguez/Bunny Lee; released on 7"-side: Bullet BU 407-A /UK
- Rico Rodriguez, feat. Gene Rondo, with The Bunny Lee All Stars: "Japanese Invasion" - Prod. by Rico Rodriguez/Bunny Lee; released on 7"-side: Bullet BU 407-B /UK
- Reco with The Rudies: "The Lion Speaks" - Prod.: Philligree /Graeme Goodall; released on 7"-side: Treasure Isle /Trojan TI 7052-B /UK
- Rico & The Rudies: "Sin Thing" - unknown producer; released on 7"-side: Doctor Bird DB 1301-A /UK
- Rico & The Rudies: "Peace" - Prod. by Sir J.J. / Philigree / Graeme Goodall; released on 7"-side: Doctor Bird DB 1302-B /UK
- Family Circle with Reco: "Official" - Prod. by Philligree (Graeme Goodall); released on 7"-side: Attack ATT 8002 /Trojan /UK
- Rico & The Rudies: "Baby Face (La Mer)" - released on 7"-side: Doctor Bird DB 1303-A, ca. 1970
- Rico & Joe's All Stars: "Hot Line" - released on 7"-side: Duke/Joe's DU 23-B /UK
- King Horror: "Loch Ness Monster" - Prod. by Laurel Aitken; released on 7"-side: Grape /Trojan GR 3007 /UK
- King Horror: "Zion I" - Prod. by Laurel Aitken; released on 7"-side: Grape /Trojan GR 3007-B /UK

=== LPs ===
- Reco Rodriguez: Reco In Reggaeland (LP: Pama ECO 14 /UK)
- Rico & The Rudies: Blow Your Horn (LP: Trojan TTL 12 /UK)
- Joe's All Stars: Brixton Cat (LP: Trojan TBL 104); Blow Your Horn and Brixton Cat have been re-issued by Trojan on one CD in 1995.

==== Soloist on ====
- Laurel Aitken, Girlie & Rico Rodriguez: Scandal In A Brixton Market (LP: Pama ECO 8 /UK)
- J.J. Jackson: The Greatest Little Soul Band in the Land (LP: MCA)

=== Compilations/Re-issues ===
- Rico & Roland Alphonso: "Bridgeview Shuffle" (7"-side: Doctor Bird DB 1177-B /UK)
- Rico: "Continental Shuffle" (a.k.a. "Red Cow") (7"-side: Doctor Bird DB 1182-B /UK)

== 1970 ==
=== Singles/single sides ===
- "Western Standard Time" - Prod.: Derrick Morgan; released on: Jennifer Jones: "Tenants" b/w Reco Rodriquez: "Western Standard Time" (7": Crab /Pama CRAB 55 /UK)
- "Jaded Ramble" - unknown producer; released on: Solomon Jones: "Here Comes The Night" b/w Reco Rodriquez: "Jaded Rumble" (7": Pama PM 812 /UK)
- "It's Love" - Prod.: Siggy Jackson; released as 7"-side: Columbia Blue Beat DB-119-B /UK
- Bunny Lee Allstars: "Brotherly Love" - Prod: Bunny Lee; released on 7"side: Escort /Pama ES 818-B /UK;

==== Des Bryan / Webster Shrowder productions ====
- Deas All Stars feat. Freddie Notes: "Night Food Reggae" - released on 7"-side: Grape /Trojan GR 3014-A /UK
- Des All Stars feat. Rico: "Walk With Des" (a.k.a. "Further Look") - released on 7"-side: Grape /Trojan GR 3014-B /UK; Ref.: "Man In The Street" re-issues in 2003 on: V.A.: Dancehall '69 (40 Skinhead Reggae Rarities) (CD: Trojan TJDDD 051 /UK)
- Des All Stars: "If I Had A Hammer" - released on 7"-side: Grape /Trojan GR 3015-A /UK
- Des All Stars feat. Rico: "Hammer Reggae" - released on 7"-side: Grape /Trojan GR 3015-B /UK
- Des All Stars feat. Rico: "Black Scorcher" - released on 7"-side: Grape /Trojan GR 3016-B /UK
- "Judgement" (a.k.a. "Going West") - Prod.: Max Romeo; sometimes prod. credits are given to Des Bryan & Webster Shrowder (or: Shrowder/Bryan/Sinclair); released on: Selwyn Baptiste: "Mo' Bay (Montego Bay)" b/w Reco's All Stars: "Going West" (7": Black Swan BW 1402 /UK); issued in JA on Soul Sound with Matrix # BW 1402-B titled "Judgement" and credited producers: Max Romeo & Bunny Lee (cf. Turner 2003, p. 377; also Alain Salvi, 2005); re-released on 7"-side: Wimpex 45-4060 /UK, 1970s; re-issued in a remixed version: Des All Stars feat. Rico: "Gone West" (extended version) b/w Des All Stars: "West Side" (12": Black Joy DH 807 /UK), produced by Desmond Popsy & Benup, 1980; re-issued as Rico & Des All Stars: "Going West" (3:25) on: Rico & Friends: Going West (CD: Creole Records CT 3027 /UK, 2002) and as: Rico Rodriguez: "Judgement" on: Max Romeo: Ultimate Collection (CD: Hip-O /Island /US, 2003)

==== Joe Mansano Productions ====
- Dice the Boss: "Tea House From Emperoro Rosko" - released on 7"-side: Joe JRS 03-B; Dice The Boss is: Hopeton Reid
- Joe The Boss: "Skinhead Revolt" - released on 7"-side: Joe JRS 09-A /UK; re-issued 2003 on V.A.: Young Gifted And Black (CD with the book of the same title by Michael de Koningh & Laurence Cane-Honeysett). They describe the track: "A heavy UK production from Joe Mansano with DJ Dice The Boss and trombone player Rico Rodriguez combining to great effect. Not a well-known record at the time, but since has become highly sought after and is certainly one of the best 'made for skinheads' records."
- Joe The Boss feat. Rico: "Brixton Is Free" - released on 7"-side: Joe JRS 16-B /UK

==== Various producers ====
- Rico & Martin Riley: Reggae Meeting - Prod. by Martin Riley; released on 7"-side: Punch PH 42-A /UK
- Martin All Stars: "Soulbone" (Reggae Meeting version?) - Prod. by Martin Riley; released on 7"-side: Punch PH 42-B /UK
- Lee's Allstars: "Annie Pama" - released on 7"-side: Pama PM 803-A /UK
- Bunny Lee Allstars: "Brotherly Love" - released on 7"-side: Escort ES 818-B /UK
- Nehemiah Reid All Stars: "Hot Pepper" - released on 7"-side: Hot Shot HS 03-A /UK; instrumental

==== Re-issues ====
- Rico: "Continental Shuffle" (a.k.a. "Red Cow") - released on 7"-side: Pama PM 798-B /UK

== 1971 ==
=== Singles/single sides ===
- Don Reco: "Waterloo Rock" - Prod. by Bush (Lloyd A. Campbell) - released on 7"-side: Big Shot BI 587-A /UK
- Reco: "Plus One" - Prod.: Rico Rodriguez / Sid Bucknor; released on 7"-side: Upsetter Pre -ERT 859-B /Ja; Escort /Pama ERT 895-B /UK
- Rico: "Back Street" b/w "Nobody Knows" - Producer: Clancy Collins; released as 7": Duke DU 75 /UK; Not issued??)
- Rico & Satch: "Surprise" (a.k.a. "Surprise Package") - Producer: Larry Lawrence; released as Rico & Satch: "Surprise" b/w Pete Johnson: "I'm Sorry" (7": Duke DU 96 /UK). "A couple of compilation albums allegedly saw the light of day [on LLs label Ethnic ca. 1973, B.], namely Music Galore and Surprise Package, the latter featuring the trombone talents of Rico Rodriguez, although we've never seen a copy." (Koningh 2004, p. 118)
- Laurie Aitken's All Stars: "Strong Back" -Prod.: Harry Mudie, ca. 1971/1972; re-release on 7": Afro HM R&B 10127-B, ca. early 2000s
- Valentine Brown, feat. Rico: "Since I Met You" b/w "Reco's version" - Prod. by Valentine Brown; released on 7": Saucy Boy SB 2 /UK; year not confirmed

== 1972 ==
=== Singles/single sides ===
- War Is Not The Answer (Pts. I and II) - Prod.: Lloyd Coxson; released as: Lester Sterling: "War Is Not The Answer (Part I)" b/w Rico: "War Is Not The Answer (Part II)" (7": Ashanti ASH 410 /UK); Part I reissued in 2002 as "Harbour View Special" on: Lester Sterling: Sterling Silver (CD: Heartbeat /US)
- Slim Smith: "The Time Has Come" - Prod.: Bunny Lee; released on 7"-side: Pama PM 850-A /UK
- Rico & Bunny Lee All Stars (a.k.a. The Aggrovators): "The Time Has Come Version" - Prod.: Bunny Lee; released on 7"-side: Pama PM 850-B /UK
- Jumbo Sterling's Allstars: "Hot Dog" - Prod. by Jack Price; released on 7"-side: Sioux SI 019-A /UK (short version + overdubs)

== 1973 ==
=== Singles /single sides ===
- Rico & The Mohawks: "Old Lady" - released on: Father Sketto: Murder In The Place b/w The Untouchables [a.k.a. Rico & The Mohawks]: Old Lady (7": Pama PM 877 /UK)
- Rico: "Keep The Faith" (a.k.a. "Reach For The Sky") - Prod. by Ranny Williams (UK)/Lloyd Charmers; released as: Junior English: "Garden Party" b/w Derrick Morgan ("actually by Rico Rodriguez And The Charmers' Band", Koningh 2004, p. 322): "Reach For The Sky (7": Pama Supreme PS 381 /UK)

=== LPs ===
==== As band member ====
- The Undivided: Listen To The World (LP: Decca /UK), with singer Gene Rondo

== 1975 ==
=== Singles/single sides ===
- Rico: "Stoke Newington Hop" - Produced by Count Shelly; released on: Brenton King: "Mama Say" b/w Rico: "Stokenewington Hop" (7": Penguin PEN 01 /UK); "It is probably the flip side of this that really wins the plaudits. 'Mama Say' has a good driving rhythm track but, depending on your personal taste, suffers a bit as a result of having strings dubbed on. 'Stoke Newington Hop' uses the same music with Rico doing his thing over the top." (Koningh 2004, p. 205)

=== LPs ===
==== Soloist on ====
- Jim Capaldi: Short Cut Draw Blood (LP: Island /UK)
- Toots & the Maytals: Reggae Got Soul (LP: Island /UK)

== 1976 ==
=== Singles ===
- Rico: "Africa" b/w "Afro Dub" - Prod. by Karl Pittersen; released on 7": Island WIP 6399 /UK

==== Soloist on ====
- Yusuf Ali (a.k.a. Prince Buster All Stars): "Uganda" - prod. by Prince Buster; released on 7"-side: Prince Buster DSR 2305 /Jamaica

=== LPs ===
- Rico: Man From Wareika (LP: Island ILPS 9485 /UK, Blue Note /US) - re-issue on CD: Island CID 9485 (not available, 2005)
- Rico: Man From Wareika Dub (Warrika Dub) (LP: Island PRE-LP 1 /UK or Ghetto Rockers PRE-LP 1); re-release on CD (Japan only), June 2004

==== Soloist on ====
- Delroy Washington: I Sus (LP: Frontline /Virgin)
- Ras Michael & The Son Of Negus: Tribute To The Emperor (LP: Trojan) - Roots Archives

== 1977 ==
=== Singles ===
- Rico: "Dial Africa (live)" b/w "Dial Dub" - Prod. by Karl Pitterson, released on 12": Island IPR 2002 /UK
- Rico: "Ska Wars" b/w "Ramble" - Prod. unknown (A); Karl Pitterson (B) - released on 12": Island IRP 2006 /UK

=== LPs ===
==== Soloist on ====
- "Certain Surprise" on John Martyn's One World (LP: Island ILPS 9492) - it's almost straight easy listening, a tinkling bossa-nova, with Harry Robinson's lush orchestration and one of the melee of visitors to Woolwich Hall Farm, Rico Rodriguez, playing an incredible sweet trombone solo. Martyn was delighted with his ability: "Rico walked in, played the one solo and walked out," he recalls. "I couldn't believe it. It was a difficult tune - semitones all over the place, a tricky little number - and then he walked in and did it in one. I love Rico. One of my favorite people in the world. A gentle man. He reminds me of Scratch. Same build, same vibe". Quote from the booklet to the 2004 reissue of the One World - deluxe edition.
- Delroy Washington: Rasta (LP: Frontline /Virgin)
- Third World All Stars: Rebel Rock (LP: Third World TWLP 103) - Album feat. Rico Rodriguez and Eddie "Tan Tan" Thornton, rec in London (cfr. Koningh 2004, p. 115)

==== Compilations/Reissues ====
- "Dial Africa (live)" on: V.A.: This Is Reggae Music (2LP: Island 300.330 /NL)

== 1978 ==
=== Singles ===
- Rico: "Take Five" b/w "Soundcheck" (12": Island IPR 2016 /UK)

=== LPs ===
- Rico: Midnight In Ethiopia (LP: Island ILPS 9516 -?-) - This LP has never been released; the 12" Island singles of the time were probably the core of this LP project by Island (not by Rico!)

==== Soloist on ====
- Burning Spear: Social Living (LP: Island) - re-issue on CD: Blood & Fire, 1994
- Burning Spear: Living Dub (LP: B.Spear PRELP 3 /JA)

== 1979 ==
=== Singles ===
- Rico: "Take Five" b/w "Soundcheck" - released as 12": Island IRP 2016 /UK; "Take Five" was also released on V.A.: Reggae Island (LP: Island 30 247 /D, side 1, track 1)
- Rico: "Children Of Sanchez" b/w "Children Of Sanchez" / "You Really Got Me" - Prod. by Dennis Bovell (A), Dennis Bovell, Leslie Palmer & John Burns (B); released as 12": Island IPR 2030 /UK

==== Soloist on ====
- Linton Kwesi Johnson: "Want Fi Go Rave" b/w "Want Fi Go Rave Version" - Prod. by LKJ; released as 7": Island WIP 6494 /UK
- Linton Kwesi Johnson: "Want Fi Go Rave" (Long version Parts 1 & 2) b/w "Reality Poem" (Long version Parts 1 & 2) - Prod. by LKJ; released as 12": Island 12XWIP 6494 /UK
- The Members: "Offshore Banking Business" - released on 7"-side: Virgin VS 248-A /UK
- Steel Pulse: "Sound System" b/w "Campers Style" (dub) - Prod. by Karl Pitterson; released as 7": Island WIP 6490 /UK
- Steel Pulse: "Sound System" b/w "Babylon Makes The Rules" - Prod. by Karl Pitterson; released as 12": Island 12WIP 6490 /UK

=== LPs ===
==== As band member ====
- The Specials: The Specials (LP: 2Tone /Chrysalis) - re-issue on CD: Chrysalis

==== Soloist on ====
- Linton Kwesi Johnson: Forces Of Victory (LP: Island /UK) - Prod. by LKJ
- Steel Pulse: Tribute To The Martyrs (LP: Island /UK)
- Wailing Souls: Wild Suspense (LP: Island /UK) - re-issued 1995 on CD (Island Reggae Refreshers)

=== Sampler/re-issues ===
- V.A.: Intensified! (LP: Island, 1979)

== 1980 ==
=== Singles ===
- Rico: "Sea Cruise" b/w "Carolina" - Prod. by Dick Cuthell & Rico Rodriguez; released on 7": 2Tone /Chrysalis CHSTT 15 /UK, Oct. 1980; " Now here was a real gem, but its instrumental nature (Rico preferred to let his trombone do the talking) meant that it never really was destined for chart success." (George Marshall, 1990); 2Tone.info

==== As band member ====
- The Special AKA: Live! Too Much Too Young ("Skinhead Symphony" / "Guns Of Navarone") - released on 7" EP: 2Tone /Chrysalis CHSTT 7 /UK; released on 12": 2Tone /Chysalis 9198 713 /D etc.
- The Specials: "International Jet Set" - Prod. by Jerry Dammers & Dave Jordan; released on 7"-side: 2Tone CHS TT 12-B /UK
- The Specials (feat. Rico): "Do Nothing" - Prod. by Dave Jordan; released on 7"-side: 2Tone CHS TT 16-A /UK

==== Soloist on ====
- Linton Kwesi Johnson: "Black Petty Booshwah" - Prod. by Linton Kwesi Johnson; released on 7"-side: Island WIP 6554 /UK
- Linton Kwesi Johnson: "De Black Petty Booshwah" / "Straight To Madray's Head" b/w Linton Kwesi Johnson feat. Rico & Dickage: "Action Line" / "Action Line Dub" - Prod. by LKJ/Dennis Bovell; released on 12": Island 12 WIP 6554 /UK
- Janet Kay And Rico: "Silhouette" - Prod. by Clem Bushay; released on 12"-side: Bushays B 108-A /UK
- Janet-K, Prince Jazzbo & Rico: "Silhouette Gone Clear" - Prod. Clem Bushay; released on 12"-side: Bushays B 108-B /UK
- The Session Men: "Solitude" - feat. Abu Baka; released on 12": LKJ Records LKJ 001 /UK
- Laurel Aitken: "Rudi Got Married" b/w "Honey Come Back to Me" (7": I-Spy /Arista /UK)

=== LPs ===
==== As band member ====
- The Specials: More Specials (LP: 2Tone /Chrysalis /UK) - re-issued on CD: Chrysalis
- The Specials: Live At The Lyceum (Promo-LP: Chysalis)

==== Soloist on ====
- Linton Kwesi Johnson: LKJ in Dub (LP: Island /UK)
- Linton Kwesi Johnson: Bass Culture (LP: Island /UK)
- "Carry Go Bring Come", track on: The Selecter: Too Much Pressure (LP: 2Tone /UK)
- The Members: 1980 - The Choice Is Yours (Album)
- Sons Of Jah: Reggae Hit Showcase (Album)
- V.A.: 21st Century Dub (2LP /Japan) - re-issue 1991 (CD: Danceteria /ROIR)

=== Sampler/re-issues ===
- V.A.: The Bluebeat Years - The Birth Of A Music (LP: Ariola 202 829-270 /D) - Compiled by Rob Bell. He remembers: "I dealt with him [Emil Shallit] in 1979–80 when Island licensed a few cuts for The Blue Beat Years. The Birth Of A Music album that I put together, attempting to trace the influence of R&B on Jamaican music. For some reason or other, he changed his mind after Island pressed the thing, and it got withdrawn. (The LP briefly surfaced in Germany only, and is now a considerable rarity.)" (Koningh, 2003, pp. 69/70)
- Dandy: "Rudy A Message to You" - released on 7"-side: Trojan 6.12678 /D; reissue of Dandy's 1967 title, remixed by Clem Bushay for this release

== 1981 ==
=== Singles/single sides ===
==== As band member ====
- The Specials: "Ghost Town" - Prod. by John Collins; released on 7"-side: 2Tone CHSTT 17-A /UK; extended version released on 12"-side: 2Tone CHSTT 1217-A /UK
- The Specials: "Why?" - Prod. by John Collins; released on 7"-side: 2Tone CHSTT 17-B /UK; released on 12"-side: 2Tone CHSTT 1217-B /UK

==== Soloist on ====
- Z: "Legalize Erdbeereis" - Prod. by Bernd Ramien; released on 7": Rocktopus 102 017 /D

=== LPs ===
- Rico: That Man Is Forward (LP: 2Tone /Chrysalis CHRTT 5005 /UK) - re-issue with Jama Rico on one CD: Chrysalis VDBD-1005 /Japan only 2Tone.info; re-issue 1998: That Man Is Forward (CD: Reggae Retro)

==== Soloist on ====
- Deadly Headly: "35 Years From Alpha and Two From Alpha" - on: Deadly Headly: 35 Years From Alpha (LP: On-U-Sound ON-U LP 14 /UK); extended re-issue 1999
- Toots & the Maytals: Knock Out! (LP: Island /UK)
- Cedric Myton & The Congos: Face The Music (LP: GoFeet /UK) - re-issue 1995: Cedric Myton & Congo: Face The Music (CD: VP) with different cover
- Cedric Myton & The Congos: "Can't Take It Away" b/w "Can't Take It Away (version)" - Prod. by Cedric Myton; released on 12": Go Feet FEET 1210 /UK
- Sammy Dread: Mr. Music (LP: JL Records)
- Chas Jankel: Questionnaire (LP)
- Chas Jankel: Chasanova (LP: A&M)
- Joan Armatrading: "Romancers" - track on: Joan Armatrading: Walk Under Ladders (LP: A&M)
- Dennis Bovell: Brain Damage (2LP: Fontana /UK)
- Z: "Legalize Erdbeereis", "Der Geist" - tracks on Z: In Berlin (LP: Rocktopus /D)

=== Sampler/re-issues ===
- The Specials: "Man At C&A" - track on: V.A. Dance Craze (LP: 2Tone TT 5004); "The horn section of Dick Cuthell and Rico Rodriguez are particularly effective on this track, giving it a real air of imminent doom."

=== Unreleased sessions ===
- Kirsty MacColl: "Goodnight Paris" / "Germany" / "Shutting The Doors" / "Don't Ask Me" - Co-written by Kirsty MacColl and Alan Lee Shaw (Damned) and recorded at Regents Park Studios with the help of Jools Holland, Pino Palladino, Rico, Dick Cuthell and Lu Edmonds (ex-Damned, Edge & Pil ...) Source: Kirsty MacColl

== 1982 ==
=== Singles ===
- Rico And The Special AKA: "Jungle Music" b/w "Rasta Call You" - Prod. by Jerry Dammers (Jungle Music); Dick Cuthell (Rasta Call You); released on 7": 2Tone CHSTT 19, 12": 2Tone CHS TT 1219), 12" with additional track: Easter Island; 2Tone.info

=== LPs ===
- Rico: Jama Rico (LP: 2Tone /Chrysalis CHRTT 5006 /UK) - reissued with That Man Is Forward on one CD: 2Tone/Japan only; 2Tone.info

==== Soloist on ====
- Michael Smith: Mi C'Yaan Believe Me (LP: LKJ Records)

== 1983 ==
=== LPs ===
==== Soloist on ====
- Paul Young: No Parlez (LP: CBS)
- I-Benjahmin: Introducing Fraction Of Jah Action (LP)

=== Sampler/re-issues ===
- Jungle Music, re-release on Sampler: V.A.: This Are Two Tone (LP: 2Tone /Chrysalis CHR TT 5007)

== 1984 ==
=== Singles ===
- Mikey Dread: "Roots & Culture" - released on 12": DEP International /UK; reissue on 10": Mikey Dread: "Roots & Culture" b/w DATC Dub Crew: "Jungle Signal" (Draed At The Control DATC TI-01 /S-57876, UK, 2005); "Jungle Signal" is the instrumental part of "Roots & Culture" as released on Dread's LP: Pave The Way.
- The Special AKA: "Break Down The Door" - Prod. by Jerry Dammers; released on 12"-side: 2Tone CHSTT 1226-B /UK
- The Special AKA: "What I Like Most About You Is Your Girlfriend" - Prod. by Jerry Dammers; released on 7"-side: 2Tone CHS TT 27-A; released on 12"-side: 2Tone CHS TT 1227-A; 2Tone.info

=== LPs ===
Soloist on:

- Mikey Dread: Pave The Way (2LP: DEP International /UK)
- Ian Dury: 4000 Weeks Holiday (LP: Stiff /UK)
- The Special AKA: In The Studio (LP: 2Tone /UK) - 2Tone.info

== 1987/88 ==
Rico Rodriguez' first engagement after several years in Jamaica for Swiss reggae band:

- Heart Beat Band: "Crossroads" b/w "Can't Stop Rudie" / "Singing Her Name" - Prod. by Heart Beat Band / Fizzè; released on 12": Mensch Music AGR 003 /CH; re-released on Peeni Waali: The Eve (2CD: Mensch /CH, 1999/2000)

== 1989 ==
=== Sampler/re-issues ===
- "That Man Is Forward", on V.A.: The Two Tone Story (2LP: 2Tone /Chrysalis CHR TT 5009)
- V.A.: Shufflin' On Bond Street (LP: Trojan)
- V.A.: Let's Ska Again (CD: Charly)

== 1990 ==
=== LPs ===
==== Soloist on ====
- Macka B: Natural Suntan (LP, CD: Ariwa ARICD 058)
- Mad Professor: Psychedelic Dub (LP, CD: Ariwa ARICD 057)
- Raggamuffin (LP: ???/France)

=== Sampler/re-issues ===
- V.A.: Special Club Ska (CD: Heartbeat)

== ca. early 1990s ==
=== LPs ===
==== Soloist on ====
- Panache Culture: Tell Them (CD: Runn /NL)
- Panache Culture: Travel In A Dream (CD: Runn)

== 1991 ==
=== Singles ===
- Rico: "Rockaman Soul" b/w "Rockaman Soul (version)" - Prod. by Fizzè; released on 7": Mesch /Blue Moon AGR 005 /CH

==== Soloist on ====
- The Trojans feat. Jenny Bellestar & Rico: Mixed Feelings - Prod. by Gaz Mayall; released on 12"-side: Gaz's Rockin' 12GAZ 017-A /UK

=== LPs ===
==== Soloist on ====
- Intense: Love & Life (CD/LP: Ariwa)
- The Mad Lighters: Play On Mr. Music (LP) - re-released as: Skatown (CD: BF-128-12)
- The Mad Professor: Psychedelic Dub. Dub Me Crazy Pt.10 (CD: Ariwa /UK)
- Peeni Waali: The Dawn (LP: Mensch Records /CH)
- The Trojans: Skalalitudes (CD: Gaz)

=== Sampler/re-issues ===
- The Specials: Specials Singles (CD: 2Tone /UK)
- The Specials: Singles Collection (CD: Chrysalis /US)
- V.A.: 21st Century Dub (CD: Danceteria)
- V.A.: History Of Ska 1 (CD: Blue Beat)
- V.A.: History Of Ska 2 (CD: Blue Beat)
- V.A.: Talking Blues (CD: Blue Beat)
- V.A.: Ska Bonanza (2CD: Heartbeat) - Three titles with Rico's contribution. The cover of this CD set is very interesting: It shows Rico and Don Drummond with Lloyd Knibb and Gladdy Anderson on piano. The photo was taken in the back room of Coxsone Dodd's Mom's liquor store at Beeston Street around 1955/57. (Brian Keyo, former Skatalites manager)

== 1992 ==
=== Singles ===
==== Soloist on ====
- Bob Marley: "Why Should I (Bone Remix)" - originally recorded in 1971; Rico's overdubs in 1992; released on 7"-side: Tuff Gong MML 2932 AA /JA, 1992; released on 5"-CD-Single: Tuff Gong /Island /Int., 1992; released on 12"-side: Tuff Gong /Island 12TGX 3-A /UK, Int.

=== LPs ===
==== Soloist on ====
- Bad Manners: Fat Sound (CD: Pork Pie /D)

=== Sampler/re-issues ===
- V.A.: Tougher Than Tough (4CD: Island, 1992)
- Rico & The Invaders: "Invaders At Carnival", Invaders: "Soul Of The Jungle", on: V.A.: The History of Ska, Blue Beat and Reggae (CD: Lagoon)

== 1993 ==
=== Contributions ===
- Dennis Bovell: Tactics (CD: LKJ-Records)

=== Sampler/re-issues ===
- "Sea Cruise" / "Jungle Music" / "Carolina" / "Rasta Call You" / "Easter Island", on: 4CD: The Compact 2Tone Story (4CD-Box: Chrysalis)
- Prince Buster: FABulous Greatest Hits (CD: Sequel)

== 1994 ==
=== LPs ===
- Rico & His Band: You Must Be Crazy (CD: Grover /D)

==== As band member ====
- Jazz Jamaica: Skaravan (CD: Quattro QTCY-2036 /JA, Skazz /UK) - re-release 1996 on: RootJazz /Hannibal HNCD 1397 /UK
- Jazz Jamaica: Jamaican Beat Vol. 1 & 2 (2CD: EMI /Japan)

==== Soloist on ====
- Kazufumi Kodama: The Return Of The Dread Beat (CD /Japan)
- Mad Professor: Anti-Racist Dub Broadcast (LP/CD: Ariwa)
- "Sweet And Dandy" on: The Selecter: Happy Album (CD)
- "Madness" on: The Selecter: Rare (CD) - recorded with Selecter & Prince Buster

=== Sampler/re-issues ===
- V.A.: Carnevale Caribe (CD: Piranha) ???
- V.A.: It's Shuffle'n Ska Time with Lloyd "The Matador" Daley (CD: Jamaica Gold)
- V.A.: It's Ska Time - 20 Original Ska Classics (CD: Charly Ska)

== 1995 ==
=== Singles ===
==== Soloist on ====
- Suggs: "I'm Only Sleeping" b/w "Off On Holidays" (5"CD: WEA)

=== LPs ===
- Rico: Wonderful World (CD: Parco /Quattro QTCY-2074 /Japan, LP: ? /Jamaica)
- Rico: Rising In The East (CD: Jove JOVECD 3 /UK)
- Rico: Return From Wareika Hill (CD: Alpha Enterprise YHR-1102 /JA) - This is the original Japan release of Rising In The East

==== Soloist on ====
- "Rudy Got Married", "Zion City" on: Laurel Aitken: The Story So Far (CD: Groover /D)
- Lee Perry: Black Ark Experryments (CD: Ariwa)
- Lee Perry: Experryments At The Grass Roots Of Dub (CD: Ariwa)
- Spiritualized Electric Mainline: Pure Phase (CD: Arista 74321 26035 2 /US), see: Discogs
- Suggs: The Lone Ranger (CD: WB)

=== Sampler/re-issues ===
- Rico: Roots to the Bone (CD: Reggae Refreshers /Island)
- Blow Your Horn & Brixton Cat (CD: Trojan); for details see Man From Wareika
- Blow Your Horn (CD: PCD-3605 /Japan)
- Wailing Souls: Wild Suspense (CD: Island Jamaica /UK)

== 1996 ==
=== Singles ===
==== A band member ====
- Jools Holland & Eddi Reader & His Rhythm & Blues Orchestra: Waiting Game (5"CD: Coliseum)

=== LPs ===
==== As band member ====
- Jools Holland & His Rhythm & Blues Orchestra: Sex & Jazz & Rock&Roll (CD: Coliseum HF 51CD /UK)

==== Soloist on ====
- Michael "Bammie" Rose: Reggae Be-Bop (CD/LP: Olive Disk & Records)

=== Sampler/re-issues ===
- Harry Mudie/V.A.: Remembering Count Ossie: A Rasta Reggae Legend (LP/CD: Moodisc Records HM-50100-2 /US) - recorded ca. 1959–61; prod. Harry Mudie; overdubs by Harry Mudie
- Deadley Headley / Rico Rodriguez: "2 From Alpha", on: V.A.: Reggae Archive (CD: On-U-Sound)

== 1997 ==
=== LPs ===
- Rico Rodriguez All Stars: Rico's Message. Jamaican Jazz (CD: Jet Star)

==== Soloist on ====
- Mad Professor: Dub You Crazy With Love (CD: Ariwa /UK)
- Ocean Colour Scene: Marchin' Already (CD: MCA /UK)
- Peeni Waali: The Return (CD: Mensch Music /CH)

=== Sampler/re-issues ===
- Rico & Freetown: "Take Five", Laurel Aitken & Freetown: "Rudy Girl" on: V.A.: Ska Island, CD: Island 40th /US
- (Track auf Various: Ska Island, CD: Island 40th /US)
- Dennis Bovell: Dub Of Ages (CD: LKJ Records)
- Ocean Colour Scene: B-Sides, Seasides & Freerides (CD: MCA) (on: "Huckleberry Grove" and "Chicken Bones & Stones")

=== Sampler/re-issues ===
- Rico: Tribute To Don Drummond (CD: Trybute TRRCD01) - re-issue of: Reco in Reggaeland (1969)
- Jump With Joey: Generations United (CD: Rycodisc)
- Jump With Joey: Strictly For You (CD: Rycodisc) - re-release original release dates for the two albums are unknown
- "Rico's Farewell", on: V.A.: Skatalites & Friends At Randy's (CD: VP)
- Derrick Morgan: Time Marches On (CD: Heartbeat)

== 1998 ==
=== LPs ===
==== Soloist on ====
- Little Tempo: Latitude (CD /Japan)
- Suggs: The Three Pyramid Club (CD)
- Prince Buster: "Whine & Grine" (5"-CD-Single: Island) - Rico's solo is not confirmed.

=== Sampler/re-issues ===
- Rico: That Man Is Forward (CD: Reggae Retro RRCD 001 /Jammyland /US)

== 1999 ==
=== LPs ===
==== As band member ====
- Jools Holland & His Rhythm & Blues Orchestra: Sunset Over London (CD: Coalition /Warner)

==== Soloist on ====
- Floyd Lloyd: Our World (2CD) - there may be two more albums by Lloyd with Rico's contribution: Mango Blues, and Village Soul
- "Star", "Skraffic Jam", "Come Away", "The Funnymen" on: Freetown: Painless (CD: Beatville BVR 1008)
- Peeni Waali: The Eve of Peeni Waali (2CD: Mensch)
- Yellowman: Yellow Fever (CD)

=== Sampler/re-issues ===
- Headley Bennett feat. Bim Sherman & Style Scott: Deadly Headley - 35 Years From Alpha (CD: On-U Sound ON-U CD 0014)
- Max Romeo: The Many Moods Of Max Romeo (CD: Jamaican Gold)
- Rico Rodriguez: "Jungle Beat(live)" on: V.A.: The Shack Vol. 2 Club Ska '99 (CD)

== 2000 ==
=== Singles ===
- Rico: "Symphony" b/w "Matilda" (7": Grover /D, Nov. 2000) - "Der Reggae-Posaunist, der Musikgeschichte schrieb, meldet sich hier mit einer neuen Single zurück! Zwei Tracks, die grooven und mit ihren Melodien direkt gefangennehmen. Rico Rodriguez stellt wieder einmal unter Beweis, dass er nach wie vor der Meister seines Instrumentes ist, und dass seine beseelten Kompositionen und sein inspiriertes Spiel unvergleichlich sind." (Grover)

=== LPs ===
- Rico: Get Up Your Foot (CD: Grover /D, released in Feb. 2001)

==== Soloist with ====
- The Mad Lighters: Shine (CD)
- Fidel Nadal: Selassie I Dios Todo Poderoso (CD: Ultima Talent /Argentina)

=== Sampler/Re-issues ===
- Rico: "Get Up Your Foot", on: V.A.: 'Up Your Ears Vol. 3 (CD: Grover /D)
- Don Drummond/Rico Rodriguez: Reggae Jazz Attack (2CD: Charly /D) - Good idea, but strange compilation of Duke Reid produced Don Drummond tracks from the 1960s and Rico's 1995/1997 release Wonderful World / Rico's Message. What makes the compilation interesting is the obvious difference between the two trombonists. Drummond is a very good inventor of melodies. But Rico has a far better feeling for his instrument. There is much more soul in his expression.
- Roland Alphonso: Something Special: Ska Hot Shots (CD: Heartbeat) - Rico on "Federal Special", "Proof Rum" and "Grand National", all originally recorded and released between 1958 and 1961)
- Laurel Aitken: Godfather Of Ska Volume 3 (1963-1966) (CD: Grover /D) - Rico on: "This Great Day", "Jenny Jenny", originally rec. in 1964 and 1962
- Laurel Aitken: The Pioneer Of Jamaican Music (CD: Reggae Retro)

== 2001 ==
=== LPs ===
- "Wareika Vibes", on: JA-13 (project coordination): Heroes Of Kingston (CD: Jamdown /UK)

==== As band member ====
- Jools Holland: Swing Album (CD)
- Jools Holland: Small World Big Band (CD)

==== Soloist on ====
- "The Cat", "Black Starliner", "Change The Mood", "Give It Up" on: Rude Rich and the High Notes: Change The Mood (CD/LP: Grover)

=== Sampler/Re-issues ===
- Rico Rodriguez/Roland Alphonso/Dizzy Moore: "Magic", on: V.A.: Knock Out Ska (CD: Heartbeat /US)

== 2002 ==
=== Singles ===
- Rico Rodriguez & Rafael Anker: "Mountain Of Wareika" b/w "Lionpaw & Zebra: Dubwise" - Prod. by Lionpaw; mixed by Zebra & Lionpaw. Rec. at Linpaw studio /Geneva; released on 7": Cultural Warrior Music CW7004 /CH

=== LPs ===
==== Soloist on ====
- Floyd Lloyd: Believer (CD: Tropic 16)
- Damon Brown: A Bigger Picture (CD: 33JAZZ 33JAZZ068 /UK) - www.damonbrown.co.uk

=== Sampler/Re-issues ===
- Rico & Friends: Going West (CD: Cactus /Creole) - material from the early 1970s
- Re-issues of the three original Specials LPs on enhanced CDs: Specials, More Specials and In The Studio contain videos

== 2003 ==
=== Singles ===
- Rico Rodriguez & Rafael Anker: "Mountain Of Wareika" (7": Cultural Warriors /Ch)
- Digi Dub: "Day One One Dub" (10": David DVD 1 /UK)

=== LPs ===
- Togetherness (CD) - Recorded live 2000 in Argentina; re-issued in 2006 on CD: Delanuca /US

==== As band member ====
- Jools Holland: Small World Big Band Friends Pt. 3 (CD: WEA)

==== Soloist on ====
- Super Furry Animals: Phantom Power (CD)

=== Sampler/Re-issues ===
- "Rico's Special", "Rico's Farewell", "Cuban Blockade" on: V.A.: The Rough Guide To Ska (CD: World Music Network, 2003)
- "Judgement" on: Max Romeo: Ultimate Collection (CD: Hip-O /Island /US) - from 1970, credited to Rico Rodriguez and written by Max Romeo and Rico Rodriguez

== 2004 ==
=== LPs ===
==== As band member ====
- Tom Jones & Jools Holland (CD: WEA)

==== Soloist on ====
- Laurel Aitken: Live At Club Ska (CD: Trojan)
- "Panic in Babylon" > Lee "Scratch" Perry: Panic In Babylon (Damp Music) - Nach langen Jahren des Wartens ist mit "Panic In Babylon" ein herausragendes Album von dem alten Reggae-Zausel Lee Perry am Start. Komponiert wurde die Musik in der Schweiz von den White Belly Rats, mit denen er auch dieses Jahr live zu sehen war! Auf die dichten und treibenden Dubreggae-Rhythmen der Band legt Perry seinen eigenartigen Gesang, den man als spontane Poesie begreifen und zwischen Genie und Wahnsinn bzw. Erde und Weltall verorten könnte. Sehr schön ist zudem die Tatsache, dass sich beim Titeltrack Rico Rodriquez mit seiner Posaune einfindet und den Tune veredelt! Endlich wieder ein aktuelles Album von Perry, das einen dicken Tipp wert ist! Aufatmen & genießen!! - k.f.

=== Sampler/Re-issue ===
- Rico: Wareika Dub (CD: Island /Japan)
- Rico: Trombone Man (2CD: Trojan /UK)
- Black Roots: On The Frontline (CD: Makasound /France)

== 2005 ==
=== Singles ===
==== Soloist on ====
- Ray Davies: Thanksgiving Day (5CD Ext. Play: V2 /UK)

=== LPs ===
==== As band member ====
- Jools Holland & His Rhythm & Blues Orchestra: Swinging The Blues Dancing The Ska (CD: Radar /WEA /UK)

== 2006 ==
=== LPs ===
- Wareika Vibes (JA 13 /UK) - recorded already in 2004; for more information, see: JA 13
- JapaRico - Rico Rodriguez meets Japan (CD: CBS / Japan)

==== Soloist on ====
- Pama International: The Trojan Sessions (CD: Trojan /UK)
- Peeni Waali: "Sha" (Mensch AGR-014 /CH) - for details see: Mensch 3000

=== Compilations/Re-issues ===
- "Rainbow Into The Rio Mino", on: V.A.: Alpha Boys School: Music In Education 1910-2006 (CD: Trojan TJCCD179 /UK)
- Togetherness (CD: Delanuca /US reissue from 2003 live album)
- Joe The Boss. The Productions of Joe Mansano (2CD: Trojan TJDDD 339 /UK)

== 2007 ==
=== Singles ===
- A Message To You, Rudy (7": Grover Supreme GRO-SP03 /D - Tracks: A1 "A Message To You, Rudy" // B1 "Rastaman Shuffle" / B2 "You Can Count On Me"

== 2008 ==
=== LPs ===
==== As band member ====
- Jools Holland & His Rhythm & Blues Orchestra (with Ruby Turner): "The Informer". (CD: Rhino)

== Misc. ==
=== Early recordings ===
- Rico: "Stabilizer" - Prod. by Keith Hudson; released on blank label 7", Jamaica; year unknown

=== Miscredits ===
- Gregory Isaacs: "Rock On" (12") - said an interview with DJ Ras Kush; but it's Vin Gordon playing here!
- Vin Gordon & The Upsetters: Musical Bones (LP: DIP /UK, ca. 1977), prod. by Lee Perry in Kingston /JA. De Koningh (2004, p. 123) gives credit to Rico & The Upsetters. This is definitely wrong; what we could not check is whether the UK release on DIP names "Rico and the Upsetters" as featured artists. This is because the original release on DIP has no label credits, merely saying "Upsetters" in red print, and was released in a plain white sleeve with just the matrix number handwritten in biro in one corner. The material has been reissued on CD (Justice League JLCD 5002), although the song titles were apparently made up for the reissue, as certainly one track, the version to the reggae rhythm "Real Rock", was originally known under another title on dub plate ca. 1974.
