= In the Studio =

Studio album by the Special AKA
- Released: 15 June 1984
- Recorded: 1982–1984
- Studios: Woodbine Studios, Leamington Spa, Warwickshire; Air Studios, London; Vineland Studios, Southwark, London; Phoenix Studios, Wembley
- Length: 42:56
- Label: 2 Tone
- Producers: Jerry Dammers; Dick Cuthell; Elvis Costello

The Specials chronology
More Specials (1980)	In the Studio (1984)	The Singles Collection (1991)

Singles from In the Studio
- 1. "War Crimes (The Crime Remains the Same)" Released: December 1982; 2. "Racist Friend" / "Bright Lights" Released: 26 August 1983; 3. "Nelson Mandela" / "Break Down the Door" Released: 5 March 1984; 4. "What I Like Most About You Is Your Girlfriend" Released: August 1984

In the Studio is the third studio album by British ska revival band the Specials. It was released under the name the Special AKA in June 1984, their only album under that name. The album took over two years to produce before finally seeing release, by which time the original Specials had long since disbanded.

In the Studio charted in the UK Top 35. It was not as commercially successful as their previous two albums, although "(Free) Nelson Mandela" became an international hit single.

== Critical reception ==
Professional ratings
Review scores
Source	Rating
AllMusic	3/5 stars
Entertainment Weekly	B
The Guardian	5/5 stars
Q	3/5 stars
Record Mirror	5/5 stars
Rolling Stone	3.5/5 stars
Smash Hits	8/10
Sounds	5/5 stars
Uncut	7/10
The Village Voice	B+

Garry Johnson of Sounds said that Jerry Dammers had made "his most powerful statement to date" with In the Studio, which Johnson described as "sublime agit-prop, a coolly sophisticated and masterfully varied modern pop cocktail", and "an album that marks not only the Special AKA's growth as a musical unit and their validity as political commentators, but also confirms Dammers' importance as a songwriter." In Record Mirror, Dylan Jones stated that while it "isn't exactly a barrel of laughs, it's certain to worm its way into the hearts of millions for its solid plaintive tunes." Mark Ellen, writing for Smash Hits, called the album "wonderfully crafted and restrained" both musically and lyrically, crediting it with making "sharp political points in a refreshingly reasoned and 'non-violent' manner" and ultimately deeming it "a little humourless, but still utterly worth the wait."

Offering more qualified praise in NME, Cynthia Rose felt that the lyrics on In the Studio were inconsistent in quality, and lamented that the "undue dips into polemicism" and "sometimes clumsy vocal mixes" undermined the album's music, which she lauded as "unlike anything else around the UK just now." At the end of 1984, In the Studio was listed as the year's third-best album by NME.

Reviewing In the Studio in retrospect, AllMusic critic Jo-Ann Greene noted its stark departure from the Specials' first two albums, observing a turn towards more unsettling music and an "ever darker" lyrical worldview, while "even the more accessible numbers have bite and exceedingly sharp edges". Greene opined that "where once there was thoughtful reasoning laced with sarcasm, here the coddling is gone, and even the irony is heavy-handed." The Guardian's Alexis Petridis concurred that "its worldview was so bleak as to make previous Specials albums ... seem like the height of giddy gay abandon", and cited a "solitary misstep: repetitious and chorus-free, it keeps solemnly hammering its message home until it sounds like it's talking down to the listener". However, he found it otherwise "utterly compelling", concluding that "as complicated and awkward as you like, In the Studio sounds less like the noble failure it was held to be on release and more like the perfect coda to the Specials' career."

== Track listing ==
No.	Title	Writer(s)	Length
1.	"Bright Lights"	John Bradbury, Stan Campbell, Dick Cuthell, Jerry Dammers	4:11
2.	"The Lonely Crowd"	Campbell, Dammers, John Shipley	3:52
3.	"What I Like Most About You Is Your Girlfriend"	Dammers	4:50
4.	"Housebound"	Dammers	4:13
5.	"Night on the Tiles"	Dammers, Shipley	3:04
6.	"Nelson Mandela"	Dammers	4:07
7.	"War Crimes"	Dammers	6:13
8.	"Racist Friend"	Bradbury, Cuthell, Dammers	3:49
9.	"Alcohol"	Dammers	5:01
10.	"Break Down the Door"	Bradbury, Cuthell, Dammers	3:36
Total length:			42:56

2015 remastered edition second CD
No.	Title	Writer(s)	Length
1.	"The Boiler"	Miranda Joyce, Penny Leyton, Jane Summers, Nicky Summers, Rhoda Dakar, Stella Barker, Sarah Jane Owens	5:47
2.	"Can't Get a Break"	Campbell, Dakar, Dammers, Gary McManus, Shipley, Bradbury	6:31
3.	"Jungle Music"	Rico Rodriguez	4:01
4.	"The Lonely Crowd" (Peel Session 12/9/83)	Campbell, Dammers, Shipley	3:20
5.	"Alcohol" (Peel Session 12/9/83)	Dammers	3:45
6.	"Bright Lights" (Peel Session 12/9/83)	Bradbury, Campbell, Cuthell, Dammers	4:09
7.	"Break Down the Door" (Instrumental)	Bradbury, Cuthell, Dammers	5:00
8.	"Racist Friend" (Instrumental)	Bradbury, Cuthell, Dammers	4:07
9.	"War Crimes" (Instrumental)	Dammers	6:21
10.	"Theme from the Boiler" (Instrumental)	Dakar, J. Summers, Shipley, Bradbury, Cuthell, Dammers	5:55
11.	"Bright Lights" (Instrumental)	Bradbury, Campbell, Cuthell, Dammers	4:19
12.	"Nelson Mandela" (Instrumental)	Dammers	4:29
Total length:			57:44

== Personnel ==
The Special AKA

- Stan Campbell – vocals
- Rhoda Dakar – vocals, backing vocals
- Jerry Dammers – organ, piano; vocals on "What I like Most About You Is Your Girlfriend"
- Gary McManus – bass guitar
- John Shipley – lead guitar
- John Bradbury – drums; bass and synthesizer on "Break Down the Door"

Additional personnel

- Rico Rodriguez – trombone
- Dick Cuthell – flugelhorn
- Andy Aderinto – saxophone
- Claudia Fontaine – backing vocals on "What I Like Most About You Is Your Girlfriend"
- Edgio Newton – vocals, percussion
- Horace Panter – bass guitar on "What I Like Most About You Is Your Girlfriend", "War Crimes" and "Alcohol"
- Roddy Radiation – lead guitar on "Racist Friend"
- Lynval Golding – backing vocals on "Night On the Tiles"
- Nigel Reeve – saxophone
- Tony "Groko" Utah – percussion on "The Lonely Crowd"
- Dave Heath – flute on "Nelson Mandela"
- Paul Speare – penny whistle on "Nelson Mandela"
- Nick Parker – violin on "War Crimes"
- Dave Wakeling, Elvis Costello, Lynval Golding, Molly Jackson, Polly Jackson, Ranking Roger - backing vocals on "Nelson Mandela"
- Caron Wheeler – backing vocals on "What I Like Most Like About You Is Your Girlfriend"
- Naomi Thompson – backing vocals on "What I Most Like About You Is Your Girlfriend"

Technical

- Jerry Dammers – production
- Dick Cuthell – production on "The Lonely Crowd" and "War Crimes"
- Elvis Costello – production on "Nelson Mandela"
- Alvin Clark, Colin Fairley, Dick Cuthell, Jeremy Green, Mark Freegard, Teri Reed – engineer
- John A. Rivers, Steve Churchyard – rhythm track engineering
- Nigel Reeve – remastering coordination
- Noel Summerville – remastering
- Adrian Thrills – sleeve notes
- David Storey – album cover design
