= Stan Campbell (singer) =

British musician

- Origin: Coventry, England
- Genres: Ska, 2 tone
- Occupation: Vocalist
- Formerly of: The Specials, the Special AKA, The Selecter

Stan Campbell is a British musician best known as a former member of The Specials, having joined as a vocalist in the early 1980s. He was also briefly a member of The Selecter. Campbell was lead vocalist on the Specials' 1984 album In the Studio, including the hit single "Free Nelson Mandela." After leaving the band, he released a self-titled solo album in 1987 that was critically well received. That album featured covers of "Crawfish", "Don't Let Me Be Misunderstood" and "Strange Fruit."

In 2002 the Coventry Evening Telegraph reported that Campbell had suffered mental health difficulties and had been "indefinitely committed to a psychiatric hospital" following convictions for "kidnapping and indecently assaulting one teenage girl and assaulting another."
