= Let's Do Rock Steady =

1967 song by Dandy Livingstone

Single by the Bodysnatchers
- A-side: "Ruder Than You" (double A-side)
- Released: February 1980
- Recorded: January 1980
- Genre: 2 tone; ska
- Length: 2:54
- Label: 2 Tone; Chrysalis
- Songwriter(s): Dandy Livingstone
- Producer(s): Roger Lomas

The Bodysnatchers singles chronology
| "Let's Do Rock Steady" / "Ruder Than You" (1980) | "Easy Life" / "Too Experienced" (1980) |

"Let's Do Rock Steady", also known as "(People Get Ready) Let's Do Rock Steady" and "People Do Rock Steady", is rocksteady song by Dandy Livingstone that was first released in October 1967 as the flip side to his single "We Are Still Rude". It was then released in early 1968 on his album Rock Steady with Dandy as "People Do Rock Steady". The song is better known for being covered by the Bodysnatchers in 1980.

== The Bodysnatchers version ==
=== Background and release ===
Formed in 1979, seven-piece all-girl band the Bodysnatchers had only recently learned to play their instruments, but received lots of interest after their first gig in November 1979 supporting the Nips. They were offered several recording deals, including EMI and Richard Branson, with the latter offering them an album deal to record in Stax Studios in Memphis. However, in January 1980, they were offered a two-single deal by 2 Tone, with whom they agreed to sign. They recorded a speeded-up version of "Let's Do Rock Steady" with producer Roger Lomas (known for his work with other ska bands such as the Selecter and Bad Manners). There were twenty-six takes as Lomas kept on wanting the band to play the song faster.

Some of the band as well as Jerry Dammers wanted "The Boiler", which was the first song the band had written, to be recorded and released as their debut single. However, 2 Tone's parent company Chrysalis pressured the band into releasing the more commercial "Let's Do Rock Steady", which was released at the end of February to coincide with the second 2 Tone tour. It was released as a double A-side single with the "Ruder Than You", written by the band with Gaz Mayall. It entered the UK Singles Chart in the second week of March, reaching its peak at number 22 four weeks later, which it held for the following week, before disappearing from the top 75 four weeks later.

Despite the moderate success of their "Let's Do Rock Steady", the Bodysnatchers only released one further single, the double A-sided "Easy Life"/"Too Experienced" in July 1980, produced by Dammers, but it only peaked at number 50 on the UK Singles Chart. Due to various pressures and differences within the band, they then split several months later in November 1980.

=== Reception ===
Reviewing for Record Mirror, Mike Nicholls wrote: "Irresistible flippancy from 2-Tone's all-boiler outfit who have unquestionably produced the label's catchiest stab to date. Recorded immediately following their signature under a month ago, the arrogant Rhoda is vocally assisted by the delicious SJ, whose axe whacks work even more of a treat than Miranda's sax and Pennie's [sic] keys". Kelly Pike for Smash Hits described it as "a promising debut release" with "a bouncy bluebeat, though not quite of Specials standard, while "Ruder Than You" with its toytown organ is far better – as catchy as flu and ten times more enjoyable". However, Betty Page for Sounds described "Let's Do Rock Steady" as "a shaky start from the 'Snatchers, and the unsurest move yet from 2-Tone. The girls have barely mastered their instruments, and it shows. The only evidence of self-assuredness is Rhoda's vocal, which holds the song together".

=== Track listing ===
7": 2 Tone / CHS TT 9

1. "Let's Do Rock Steady" – 2:54
2. "Ruder Than You" – 2:50

=== Personnel ===
- Rhoda Dakar – vocals
- Sarah Jane Owen – lead guitar, backing vocals
- Stella Barker – rhythm guitar
- Nicky Summers – bass guitar
- Penny Leyton – keyboards
- Jane Summers – drums
- Miranda Joyce – saxophone

=== Charts ===
| Chart (1980) | Peak position |
|---|---|
| UK Singles (OCC) | 22 |
