= Lord Brynner =

Trinidadian calypsonian (c.1937–1985)

- Born: Kade Simon c. 1937; Erin, Trinidad
- Died: 1985
- Genres: Calypso, Ska
- Years active: 1957–1970s
- Labels: Erin, WIRL

Kade Simon (c. 1937 – 1985), better known as Lord Brynner, was a Trinidadian calypsonian who won the Trinidad and Tobago Independence Calypso Contest in 1962. He also had a number of Ska hits in Jamaica during the mid-1960s.

== Biography ==
Kade Simon was born in Erin, Trinidad. Taking inspiration from the actor Yul Brynner, he adopted the stage name Lord Brynner, together with the shaved head of the actor, and became a popular calypsonian in the late 1950s. He joined the West India Regiment and relocated to Jamaica, where he continued to perform, before returning to Trinidad after the collapse of the West Indies Federation. He won the Trinidad & Tobago Independence Calypso Contest in August 1962 with the aptly-themed "Trinidad and Tobago Independence", beating the likes of Mighty Sparrow, Nap Hepburn and the Mighty Bomber. His success led to performances throughout the Caribbean, and also in more than 60 countries in total, including Canada, Hong Kong, Kenya (at the country's independence celebrations in 1963), Israel, Greece, Italy, Mexico, and in New York City at the 1964 World's Fair and later at Carnegie Hall and the Lincoln Center.

One of his mid-1960s Ska recordings, "Where's Sammy Gone", featured The Wailers as backing vocalists, and he recorded several other Ska singles in Jamaica, including "Congo War" in 1964, a collaboration with The Sheiks (featuring Jackie Mittoo and Dobby Dobson).

He continued to be one of the islands' most popular calypso artists throughout the 1960s and 1970s, and during his career released 13 albums and more than 50 singles. In 1970 he toured with his "Calypsorama '70" show, which included musicians and a dance troupe. His lyrical themes included local politics and events, romance, cricket, and world events such as the Vietnam War.

In the 1970s he lived in Jamaica, owning and running the Big Bamboo club in Montego Bay, where he performed regularly.

Kade Simon died in 1985.

== Legacy ==
In 2012, to celebrate Trinidad and Tobago's 50 years of independence, a calypso competition was named in his honour — the 50th Anniversary of Independence Lord Brynner National Calypso Competition.

== Discography ==
=== Albums ===
- Calypsorama (1968), WIRL
- Rosslyn Pussy (196?)'
- Big Big Bamboo Calypso (1968), Erin
- Trinidad Calypso in Jamaica Reggae (196?)
- Calypso in Steel (196?)
- Calypso Carnival, Erin
- Calypsorama In Jamaica , Erin

== Calypso titles ==
- Trinidad and Tobago Independence Calypso Competition - 1962
- TTT Television Calypso Competition - 1964
