= Free Nelson Mandela =

"Nelson Mandela"

Single by the Special A.K.A.

from the album In the Studio
- B-side: "Break Down the Door!"
- Released: 8 March 1984
- Genre: Ska
- Length: 4:12
- Label: 2 Tone CHS TT26
- Songwriter: Jerry Dammers
- Producer: Elvis Costello

The Special A.K.A. singles chronology
"Racist Friend" / "Bright Lights" (1983)	"Nelson Mandela" / "Break Down the Door" (1984)	"What I Like Most About You Is Your Girlfriend" / "Can't Get a Break" (1984)

"Nelson Mandela" (known in some versions as "Free Nelson Mandela") is a song written by British musician Jerry Dammers, and performed by the band the Special A.K.A. with a lead vocal by Stan Campbell. It was first released on the single "Nelson Mandela"/"Break Down the Door" in 1984.

It was a protest against the imprisonment of Nelson Mandela by the South African government during the apartheid era, and is considered a notable anti-apartheid song.

The backing vocals were performed by Molly and Polly Jackson, two girls the band's drummer John Bradbury had "met in a bar in Camden", while the chorus was performed by session singers including Claudia Fontaine and Caron Wheeler, who later went on to appear with Soul II Soul.

Unlike most protest songs, the track is upbeat and celebratory, drawing on musical influences from South Africa. The song peaked at number nine on the UK Singles Chart and was immensely popular in Africa. In December 2013, following the news of Nelson Mandela's death, the single re-entered at number 96 on the UK Singles Chart.

== Reception ==
Dammers told Radio Times: "I knew very little about Mandela until I went to an anti-apartheid concert in London in 1983, which gave me the idea for 'Nelson Mandela'. I never knew how much impact the song would have: it was a hit around the world, and it got back into South Africa and was played at sporting events and ANC rallies. It became an anthem."

Like Dammers, during the early 1980s, not many people outside of South Africa knew who Mandela was or what he stood for. Britain's Prime Minister, Margaret Thatcher, had recently condemned Mandela as a terrorist because of his resistance against the South African government.

In an interview with The Guardian, Dammers noted how a little while after the song’s release, “The song was banned in South Africa, but they played it at football matches, which were communal black gatherings," proving just how powerful the song was. It soared up the charts. The song achieved its intent, bringing Mandela’s intentions and anti-apartheid message to the forefront of conversations. It wasn’t simply the magnitude of younger individuals who now learned about Mandela, but according to South African writer Jonny Steinberg, “what that name came to mean." Further acting as a catalyst for the song's success was the band's status as a top 10 band in England, therefore giving them credibility and sway in their release of such a song. Veteran DJ and broadcaster Paul Gambaccini is quoted as saying, “If the Specials say it, there must be something to it.”

Stan Campbell left the band right after the recording of the song and the release of the video for the song, and had to be persuaded to rejoin briefly for two live appearances on the BBC television show Top of the Pops in 1984. Following those appearances, Campbell left for good.

In 1984, the students' union at Wadham College, Oxford, passed a motion to end every college "bop" (dance) with the song. The tradition continues to this day. A Nelson Mandela 70th Birthday Tribute remake, released in 1988, featured Elvis Costello, Dave Wakeling, Ranking Roger and Lynval Golding on backing vocals.

At the Nelson Mandela 90th Birthday Tribute in London's Hyde Park in June 2008, the song was performed as the show's finale, with Amy Winehouse on lead vocals. However, careful listening to the soundtrack revealed that, instead of "Free Nelson Mandela", she at times sang "Free Blakey, My Fella" (a reference to her husband, Blake Fielder-Civil, a former drug dealer imprisoned for assault).

The song was featured on Peter Kay's spoof television programme Britain's Got the Pop Factor. In March 2010, the New Statesman listed it as one of the "Top 20 Political Songs". Bruce Springsteen and the E Street band opened with the song in January 2014, at the Bellville Velodrome in Cape Town, South Africa, in the band's first ever concert in South Africa, which took place just six weeks after Mandela's death. Springsteen later dedicated "We Are Alive" to Mandela.

== Track listing ==
=== Recording of 1984 ===
- CHS TT26 7"
1. "Nelson Mandela" (Dammers) – 4:12
2. "Break Down the Door!" (Dammers, Campbell, Bradbury) – 3:48
- CHS TT1226 12"
1. "Nelson Mandela (Extended Version)" (Dammers) – 4:34
2. "Break Down the Door! (Extended Version)" (Dammers, Campbell, Bradbury) – 5:01
- Chrysalis 12" 4V9 42793 – American Version
1. "Free Nelson Mandela (Club Mix)" (Dammers) – 6:28
2. "Free Nelson Mandela (Instrumental Mix)" (Dammers) – 4:30
3. "Free Nelson Mandela (LP Version)" (Dammers) – 4:07

=== Recording of 1988 ===
- Tone FNM1 7" (70th Birthday Remake)
1. "Free Nelson Mandela (70th Birthday Remake)" (Dammers)
2. "Nelson Mandela (Original Version)" (Dammers)
- Tone FNMX1 12" (70th Birthday Remake)
1. "Free Nelson Mandela (The Whole World is Watching Dance Mix)" (Dammers)
2. "Nelson Mandela (Original Version)" (Dammers)

== Personnel ==
=== Recording of 1984 ===
- Elvis Costello – producer
- Stan Campbell – lead vocals
- Jerry Dammers – organ
- John Shipley – guitar
- Gary McManus – bass
- John Bradbury – drums
- Rhoda Dakar – vocals
- Molly Jackson – vocals
- Polly Jackson – vocals
- Dick Cuthell – trumpet
- Andy Aderinto – saxophone
- David Heath – flute
- Paul Speare – penny whistle
- Afrodiziak (Caron Wheeler, Naomi Thompson, Claudia Fontaine), Molly Jackson, Polly Jackson, Lynval Golding, Elvis Costello, Ranking Roger, Dave Wakeling – backing vocals

=== Recording of 1988 ===
- Jerry Dammers, Tom Fredrickes – producer
- Ndonda Khuze – lead vocals
- Jerry Dammers – bass program, drum program, keyboards
- Rhythm Doctor – scratches
- Jonas Gwangwa – trombone
- Betty Boo Hlelea, Julia Mathunjwa, Pinise Saul – backing vocals

== Charts ==
=== Weekly charts ===
Chart (1984)	Peak position
Australia (Kent Music Report)	66
Belgium (Ultratop 50 Flanders)	8
Irish Singles (IRMA)	6
Netherlands (Dutch Top 40)	6
Netherlands (Single Top 100)	9
New Zealand (Recorded Music NZ)	1
UK Singles (Official Charts)	9

Chart (1988)	Peak position
UK Singles (Official Charts Company)	93

Chart (2013)	Peak position
UK Singles (Official Charts Company)	96

=== Year-end charts ===
Chart (1984)	Position
Belgium (Ultratop Flanders)	96
Netherlands (Dutch Top 40)	69
Netherlands (Single Top 100)	97
