= The Bodysnatchers (band) =

English band

- Origin: London, England
- Genres: 2 Tone, ska, rocksteady
- Years active: 1979–1981
- Label: 2 Tone Records
- Past members: Rhoda Dakar; Sarah Jane Owen; Stella Barker; Nicky Summers; Penny Leyton; Miranda Joyce; Jane Summers

The Bodysnatchers were a seven-piece all-female band involved in the British 2 Tone ska revival of the late 1970s and early 1980s.

== Career ==
Formed in London by Nicky Summers in 1979, in the aftermath of the punk rock scene, The Bodysnatchers released two ska/rocksteady singles on 2 Tone Records. Their first concert was in November 1979 at the Windsor Castle pub in west London, where they supported Shane MacGowan's band The Nips. For their third gig, they were invited by Chrysalis Records to play at Debbie Harry's birthday party in late 1979. After signing to 2 Tone Records, the band released the single "Let's Do Rock Steady" (UK No. 22) and made an appearance on Top of the Pops in March 1980. They undertook a tour supporting The Selecter in spring 1980, and during that summer toured with The Specials and The Go-Go's. They also released the double A side single "Easy Life"/"Too Experienced" which was produced by Jerry Dammers. The Bodysnatchers also played London's Hammersmith Odeon supporting Toots and the Maytals, as well as other slots with artists such as Lene Lovich and Madness.

They appeared in the documentary film Dance Craze, featuring live performances by various 2 Tone bands. The Bodysnatchers played together for less than two years, with the group disbanding in 1981, not having released an album.

The band recorded two sessions for the John Peel Show. 14 April 1980: What's This?; Ghost of the Vox Continental; Happy Time Tune; The Boiler. 8 September 1980: Private Eye; Hiawatha; Mixed Feelings; The Loser

=== Aftermath ===
Five of the original band-members evolved into another all-female band, The Belle Stars, who had a number of chart hits in the UK between 1982–83 and a US Top 20 hit with their version "Iko Iko" in 1989 (three years after the band had split up, though the track was featured in the film Rain Man). After The Specials' original vocalists left the band, the Bodysnatchers' lead singer, Rhoda Dakar, went on to sing with The Special AKA. Although The Bodysnatchers did not record an album, their original composition "The Boiler", a harrowing tale of rape, was later recorded by Dakar and The Special AKA, featuring Nicky Summers on bass guitar.

In 1984, Sarah Jane Owen and Penny Leyton formed the all-female ska band, The Deltones, who released an album and two singles on Unicorn Records in 1989. The group disbanded in 1991.

Dakar has performed in Skaville UK, alongside former Bad Manners members Martin Stewart and Louis Alphonso. Dakar contributed vocals to Skaville UK's debut album, 1973, which was released in July 2007. In late 2007, Dakar released a solo album on Moon Ska World. Cleaning In Another Woman's Kitchen is an acoustic album featuring new material plus covers of The Bodysnatchers hits "Do Rocksteady" and "Easy Life".

== Line-up ==
- Rhoda Dakar – vocals
- Sarah Jane Owen – lead guitar
- Stella Barker – rhythm guitar
- Nicky Summers – bass guitar
- Penny Leyton – keyboards
- Miranda Joyce – alto sax
- Jane Summers – drums (1979–1980)
- Judy Parsons – drums (1980–1981)

== Discography ==
- 1980 "Let's Do Rock Steady" (UK No. 22) / "Ruder Than You"
- 1980 "Easy Life" (UK No. 50) / "Too Experienced"

=== Compilations ===
- Dance Craze
- The Two Tone Story
- This Are Two Tone
- A Taste of Two Tone
