= Rhoda Dakar =

English singer and musician

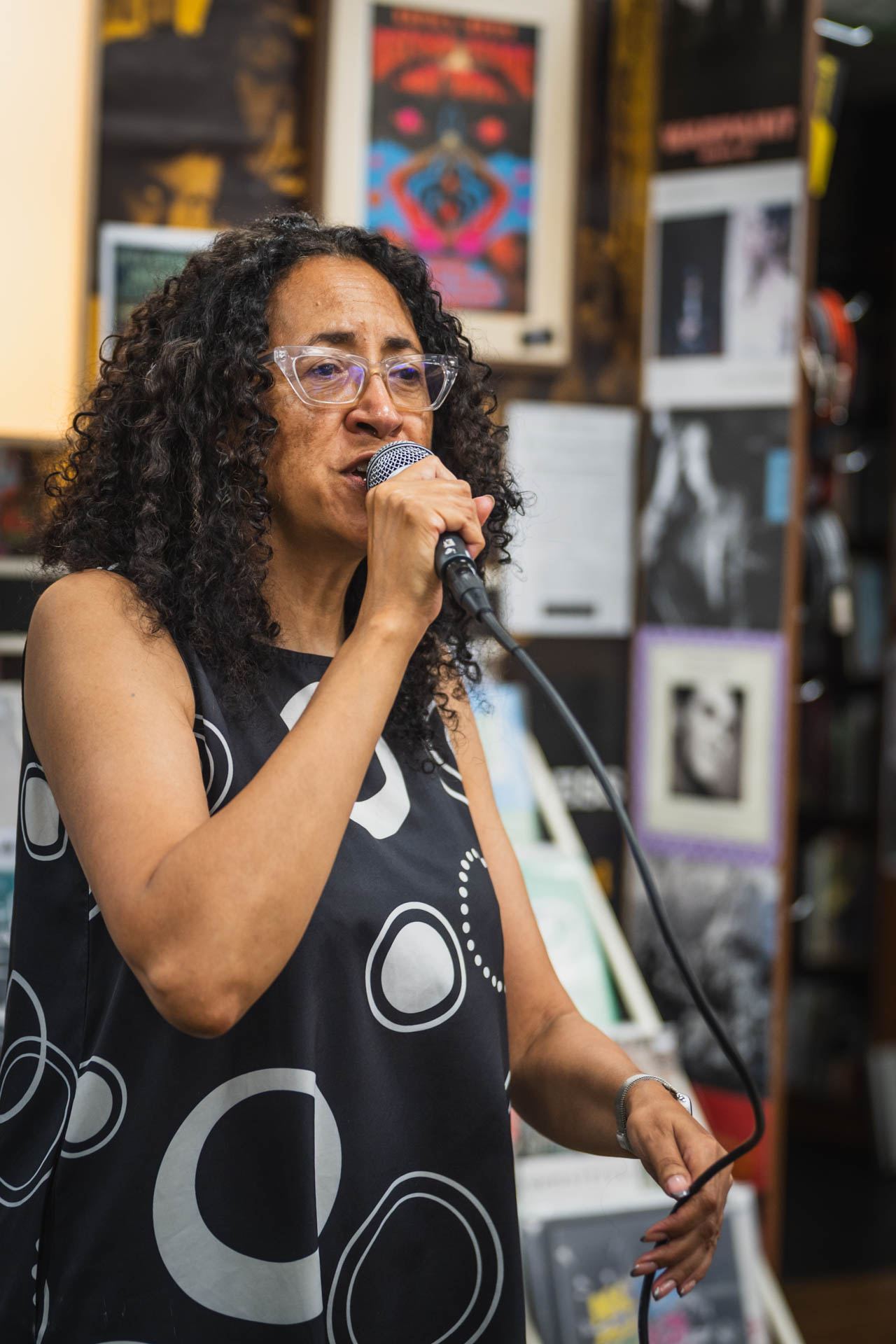
- Rhoda Dakar in 2025

Background information
- Born: 1959 (age 66–67); Hampstead, England
- Occupations: Singer and musician

Rhoda Dakar (born 1959) is an English singer and musician, best known as the lead singer of The Bodysnatchers, who were signed to the 2 Tone record label. She also worked with The Specials/Special AKA, and also other 2-Tone artists.

== Career ==
Dakar, born in Hampstead, London, joined The Bodysnatchers in 1979. Their first single was a double A-side "Let's Do Rock Steady" backed with "Ruder Than You". It reached # 22 in the UK Singles Chart. The band were invited to appear on Top of the Pops, to tour with The Selecter and to record a session for BBC Radio 1 disc jockey John Peel. Their second single "Easy Life" coupled with their version of Bob Andy's "Too Experienced" reached number 50. Several members of the Bodysnatchers then left to form The Belle Stars.

Dakar also collaborated with The Specials. Her duet with Terry Hall, "I Can't Stand It", appeared on the album More Specials. She also sang backing vocals on "Pearl's Cafe" on the album. After The Specials announced their break up in 1981, Jerry Dammers formed The Special AKA, along with Dakar and John Bradbury. Their first single release, "The Boiler", reached # 35 in the UK Singles Chart in 1982.

Dakar performed on The Special AKA album In the Studio, which featured the UK Top 10 single "Free Nelson Mandela". The album reached # 34 in the UK Albums Chart.

Her first solo album, Cleaning in Another Woman's Kitchen, was released in November 2007 on Moon Ska World. It featured acoustic versions of songs from the Bodysnatchers as well as material co-written with Nick Welsh, who attended the same comprehensive school as Buster Bloodvessel, and who recorded as King Hammond in the early 1990s. Dakar and Welsh released a garage rock album Back to the Garage on N1 Records in April 2009.

In 2009, she was the featured guest vocalist on the song "On the Town" on the Madness album The Liberty of Norton Folgate. She performed the track at their Madstock show in Victoria Park, London in July 2009.

In 2014, she returned to the studio to re-record The Bodysnatchers tracks for the album Rhoda Dakar sings the Bodysnatchers. The line up for the recording included Lynval Golding and Horace Panter from The Specials, plus members of Pama International and Intensified.

The single "Stand Together" was a collaboration with the Dub Pistols, released coincidentally on Blackout Tuesday in June 2020. The video featured US activists Martin Luther King, Malcolm X and Rosa Parks.

In 2022, Rhoda had a guest appearance on the song "As We Live" on the album "In the Wild" by The Interrupters.

In May 2023 Dakar released "Version Girl", an album of covers of some of her favourite songs, on Sunday Best records. The culmination of a project spawning five singles, the first of which, "Everyday Is Like Sunday", was released in April 2021. The project was delayed by the Covid pandemic and the subsequent 'great vinyl shortage'. Another single has been added to the set, "I Don't Mind", a Buzzcocks cover, not available on the album and released in February 2024. The project is notable for having all the artwork designed by acclaimed Sheffield artist Pete McKee.

== Discography ==
=== Singles ===
==== Solo ====
Year	Single	Chart positions		Album
Year	Single	UK Official	UK Vinyl	Album
2013	"Too Nice to Talk To"	—	—	Specialized II: Beat Teenage Cancer (Various artists)
2022	"Everyday Is Like Sunday"	—	6	Version Girl
2022	"The Man Who Sold the World"	—	24	Version Girl
2022	"Walking After Midnight"	—	29	Version Girl
2022	"As Tears Go By"	—	12	Version Girl
2023	"What a Wonderful World"	—	9	Version Girl
2024	"I Don't Mind"	—	16	Non-album single

==== with The Bodysnatchers ====
Year	Single	Chart positions	Album
Year	Single	UK	Album
1980	"Let's Do Rock Steady"	22	Non-album single
1980	"Easy Life"	50	Non-album single

==== with The Special AKA ====
Year	Single	Chart positions	Album
Year	Single	UK	Album
1982	"The Boiler"	35	—
1982	"War Crimes"	84	In the Studio
1983	"Racist Friend"	60	In the Studio
1984	"Free Nelson Mandela"	9	In the Studio
1984	"What I Like Most About You Is Your Girlfriend"	51	In the Studio

==== with The Dub Pistols ====
Year	Single	Chart positions	Album
Year	Single	UK	Album
2022	"Stand Together"	—	Addict

=== Albums ===
==== Rhoda Dakar ====
Title	Album details	Chart positions
Title	Album details	UK
Cleaning in Another Woman's Kitchen	Released: November 2007; Label: Moon Ska Records	—
Back to the Garage (with Nick Welsh)	Released: April 2009; Label: N1 Records	—
Rhoda Dakar Sings the Bodysnatchers	Released: October 2015; Label: Own label	—
Version Girl	Released: June 2023; Label: Sunday Best Records	10

==== with The Special AKA ====
Title	Album details	Chart positions
Title	Album details	UK
In the Studio	Released: June 1984; Label: 2Tone Records	34

==== Other appearances ====
Title	Album details	Chart positions
Title	Album details	UK
Various Artists: Dance Craze	Released: February 1981; Label: 2Tone Records	5
Various Artists: This Are Two Tone	Released: November 1983; Label: 2Tone Records	51
Various Artists: The Two Tone Story	Released: July 1989; Label: 2Tone Records	16
Madness: The Liberty of Norton Folgate	Released: May 2009; Label: Lucky 7 Records	5

=== EPs ===
==== Solo ====
Title	Details	Chart positions
Title	Details	UK
The Lotek Four Vol. I	Released: October 2016; Label: Own label	—
The Lotek Four Vol. II	Released: October 2018; Label: ES Superior Recordings	—
