= The Boiler =

Single by Rhoda with the Special A.K.A.
- B-side: "Theme From The Boiler"
- Released: 11 January 1982
- Recorded: 1981
- Genre: Ska; pop
- Length: 5:42
- Label: 2 Tone
- Songwriters: Miranda Joyce, Penny Leyton, Jane Summers, Nicky Summers, Rhoda Dakar, Stella Barker, Sarah Jane Owens
- Producer: Jerry Dammers

The Specials singles chronology
"Ghost Town" / "Why?" / "Friday Night, Saturday Morning" (1981)	"The Boiler" / "Theme From The Boiler" (1982)	"Jungle Music" / "Rasta Call You" / "Easter Island" (1982)

"The Boiler" is a single by Rhoda Dakar with the Special AKA (The Specials). It was released in January 1982 on 2 Tone Records.

== Early version ==
"The Boiler" is about a woman with low self-esteem ('boiler' being a pejorative term for a sexually unattractive woman) who is raped and assaulted. In the song Rhoda Dakar references the rape of a friend some years before.

"The Boiler" was the first song The Bodysnatchers wrote themselves; prior to this they only had played old ska covers. Jerry Dammers wanted to produce it for the band, but pressure from Chrysalis (who looked after the 2 Tone label) caused The Bodysnatchers to record the more commercial "Let's Do Rock Steady." Due to musical and some personal differences, The Bodysnatchers disbanded after a year, and some members went on to form The Belle Stars; while remaining on friendly terms with The Belle Stars, founder member and bass guitarist Nicky Summers chose to work with Rhoda. There is a live bootleg version of "The Boiler" from 1980, on "The Bodysnatchers Live at Folkestone," though it is a rough mix. There also exists an as-yet-unreleased specially-recorded version from the John Peel show.

== Live with The Specials ==
Rhoda Dakar, who had sung some tunes on the More Specials album, went on tour with The Specials in 1981 more or less by accident, first as a guest then as a permanent fixture. Not long after making the "Ghost Town" promo, "The Boiler" got added to the set list. The Specials played "The Boiler" on their North American tour. There are at least two bootleg versions of "The Boiler" live with The Specials in 1981. These versions are slightly polished but played in a fast and intense way so that it still sounds very different from the much more laid-back recorded version.

Rhoda Dakar and Jerry Dammers started working on "The Boiler" but then another project caught Jerry Dammers' attention (Dance Craze the live British ska concert movie), so "The Boiler" was again put on hold. Rhoda has stated remembering recording her part of the song in the studio about a year before its release, a long and difficult process.

== Split of The Specials ==
Prior to the split of The Specials in the summer of 1981, Jerry Dammers started working again on "The Boiler", making different remixes and after the split Jerry Dammers finally produced "The Boiler". This also helped to keep the outside world quiet about the future, and hopefully to help heal the wounds of the split. They recorded it with Jerry Dammers on keyboard, John Bradbury on drums, John Shipley from The Swinging Cats on guitar, and Dick Cuthell on brass, with Nicky Summers on bass. After going on tour with Rico Rodriguez, they also recorded "Jungle Music," this time with Horace Panter on bass. Not long after that, Horace left The Specials. Jerry Dammers, John Bradbury, Dick Cuthell, Rico Rodriguez, John Shipley, Rhoda Dakar and some new members went on until 1984 as The Special AKA.

== Release ==
The song was released on 11 January 1982 under the name of “Rhoda with the Special AKA.” There is only one (live) TV performance of this song, on the Oxford Road Show, with no band, instead using the instrumental version from the B-side of "The Boiler" (called "Theme from the Boiler"). The song with “the difficult message” received limited radio-play because of its subject, but still it managed to reach number 35 in the charts. For Jerry Dammers it was about ideals, making a statement, not making money; this song was meant to be heard once. Of course, it didn't help to get a firmer base for the band and 2 Tone records but that wasn't something Jerry was thinking about.

"The Boiler" had a promo video, which was made on 16mm film by Coventry art student Lizzie Soden from Lanchester Polytechnic (now Coventry University). As Soden was a student, she got together a union crew from Nottingham film workshop so the film could be broadcast. She devised the script with Steve Binnion and they edited it in Nottingham. Rather than visually depict an actual rape at the end with Rhoda being overpowered by a man, they chose to cut a random selection of images taken from filming straight from the TV depicting violent men and passive women. These were collaged together over the screaming on the soundtrack, putting the rape in a wider social context. This left problems with copyright clearance. However the concept was about wanting to depict the rape as being synonymous with gaining or assuming power (in this case because of the money the male had spent on the victim, and he assuming he then could do as he wished). It was broadcast twice; but the second time, the footage from the TV collage was taken out because of copyright problems, and substituted by a simulated silhouetted rape in a dark alley.

The song was ranked among the top ten "Tracks of the Year" for 1982 by NME.

== Track listing ==
7" vinyl – 2 Tone CHS TT18

1. "The Boiler" (Joyce, Leyton, J & N Summers, Dakar, Barker, Owens) – 5:42
2. "Theme From The Boiler" (Dakar, Summers, Shipley, Bradbury, Cuthell, Dammers) – 4:12

== Personnel ==
- Rhoda Dakar – vocals
- Nicky Summers – bass
- John Shipley – guitar
- John Bradbury – drums
- Dick Cuthell – cornet
- Jerry Dammers – organ, sleeve design, production, all arrangements

== Weekly charts ==
Chart (1982)	Peak position
UK Singles (OCC)	35
