= Delroy Washington =

Jamaican-British reggae singer (1952–2020)

- Born: 5 November 1952; Westmoreland, Jamaica
- Origin: London, England
- Died: 27 March 2020 (aged 67) London, England
- Genres: Reggae
- Years active: Late 1960s–mid-1980s
- Label: Virgin

Delroy Washington (5 November 1952 – 27 March 2020) was a Jamaican-British reggae singer best known for his releases for Virgin Records in the late 1970s.

== Biography ==
Born in Westmoreland, Jamaica, Washington moved with his family to London in the early 1960s. His early experience in the music industry was as a session musician and tour manager. As a member of the band Rebel he recorded material for CBS Records which was not released.

In 1973 he released an independently produced single "Lonely Street" on the Count Shelly label. He recorded backing vocals for The Wailers on the Catch a Fire album, after befriending Bob Marley in the early 1970s, and he continued to provide backing vocals for Wailers albums until the late 1970s. Washington wrote songs with Marley and worked with him on making Marley's lyrics more suitable for European listeners.

He also provided backing vocals on the debut album from Aswad. He continued to record as a solo artist and was one of the first reggae artists signed by Virgin Records in the mid-1970s, his "Give All the Praise to Jah" single became a success on the British reggae charts. He released two albums on Virgin, I Sus in 1976 and Rasta in 1977. Both albums featured musicians such as Al Anderson, Rico Rodriguez, and George Oban.

After leaving Virgin he released a handful of singles on different labels up to the early 1980s. He appeared on the 1984 Jah Shaka album Message From Africa, singing the opening track "Help One Another".

Both of his Virgin albums were reissued in the early 2000s.

Washington founded the Federation of Reggae Music, which worked with Brent Council to install a blue plaque on the house in Neasden where the Wailers lived in the early 1970s.

Washington was diabetic, but he followed a healthful lifestyle to manage the disease: He was a pescetarian and practiced karate.

Washington died in London on 27 March 2020 from COVID-19.

== Discography ==
=== Albums ===
- I Sus (1976), Virgin
- Rasta (1977), Virgin

=== Singles ===
- "Jah Man a Come" (1973), Lord Koos
- "Lonely Street" (1973), Count Shelly
- "Papa Was a Rolling Stone" (1973), Sir Christopher
- "Freedom Fighters" (1976), Axum
- "Give All the Praise to Jah" (1977), Virgin - 12-inch
- "Memories" (1978), Burning Sounds - Delroy Washington & Jah Son
- "It's Like Magic" (1980), Burning Vibrations - 12-inch
- "Magic" (1980), Direction Discs/Ballistic - Delroy Washington Band
- "Cool Rasta" (1980), Ballistic
- "For Your Love" (1981), Ankh/Pinnacle
