= Dobby Dobson =

Jamaican reggae singer (1942–2020)

- Born: Highland Ralph Dobson; 5 July 1942; Kingston, Jamaica
- Died: 21 July 2020 (aged 78) Coral Springs, Florida, US
- Genres: Rocksteady, Reggae
- Occupations: Singer, record producer
- Instrument: Vocals
- Years active: 1970s–2020
- Labels: Blue Cat, Capo

Highland Ralph Dobson OD (5 July 1942 – 21 July 2020) was a Jamaican reggae singer and record producer, nicknamed "The Loving Pauper" after one of his best known songs.

== Biography ==
Dobson began singing while a student at Central Branch School in Kingston and at Kingston College, where he sang in the chapel choir, and successfully took part in Vere Johns Opportunity Hour talent contest as a member of The Twilights. While at Kingston College he wrote the doo-wop song "Cry a Little Cry" as a tribute to his biology teacher. He recruited a group of schoolmates from the Delta stream at the college to back him on a recording of the song, under the name the Dobby Dobson and the Deltas; The group included Howard Barrett (who later formed The Paragons). Released by Lyndon and Sonia Pottinger's Tip-Top label in 1959, it topped the RJR charts that year.

Leaving school in 1959, Dobson went on record with Charles Josephs as part of the duo Chuck and Dobby, before becoming a solo artist in the early 1960s, again recording for Pottinger. He later moved on to work with both Coxsone Dodd and Duke Reid, recording as a member of both The Virtues and The Sheiks, and recorded "Loving Pauper" with Reid, which became his signature tune. Despite his musical success, Dobson kept his job as a salesman and proof-reader for The Jamaica Gleaner. In 1971, he recorded "That Wonderful Sound" for Rupie Edwards, which sold over 40,000 copies in the Caribbean, and was followed up by the equally successful "Endlessly", which was also a minor hit on the UK Singles Chart.

Disappointing album sales led Dobson to move into production, including The Meditations' late 1970s albums Message From The Meditations and Wake Up, as well as early work by Barrington Levy. In 1979, Dobson emigrated to New York City, where he worked in real estate, although he would still occasionally visit the recording studio, and performed at both the Reggae Sunsplash and the Reggae Sumfest festivals. He continued to be popular with international fans, and was still releasing albums.

Dobson was featured in a 2009 3-D documentary called Dobby Dobson: An Interview with Jamaica's Music Ambassador, which had the tagline: "See The Double-D in 3D".

On 6 August 2011, being the 49th anniversary of the country's independence, the Governor-General of Jamaica conferred the Order of Distinction in the rank of Officer (OD) upon Dobson, for his contribution to reggae music and representation of Jamaican culture.

He became a born-again Christian and recorded several gospel albums.

== Death ==
Dobson, who had Alzheimer's disease, died from COVID-19 at a hospital in Coral Springs, Florida, on 21 July 2020, during the COVID-19 pandemic in Florida.

== Albums ==
- Wonderful Sound (1970), Success
- Strange (1970), Pama
- God Bless Our Love, Straker's
- Baby I'm Yours (1977), WIRL/Double-D
- Something Old Something New (1977), Double-D
- Sweet Dreams (1978), Federal
- Dobby Dobson (1978), Gorgon
- Oh God, Are You Satisfied (1978), United Artists
- Sweet Christmas (1978), Top Ranking (featuring Ringo)
- Lovers Roots (198?), Success – split with Rupie Edwards
- Nothing But Love Songs Vol.3 (1980), Pioneer International
- For Lovers Everywhere (1983), K&K
- Sweet Dream Again! Volume 2, Pioneer International
- Love You Thru It All, Studio One
- History For Lovers (1990), Shelly's
- At Last (1994), Angella
- If I Only Had Time (1997), Angella
- Hide Under The Bed (2001), Innerbeat
- Lovers Prayer (2005)
- Those Days are Gone (2006)
- He Knows My Heart (2008), Dobby Dobson
- Tomorrow (2007), Dobby Dobson
- Love Songs for Jesus (2008), Dobby Dobson
- You Raised Me Up
- A Songs For Everyone (2011), MVD
- I'm Just a Nobody (2012)
- Desperation (2012), Dobby Dobson
- i can't breathe (2020), Dobby Dobson
- T.N.T (1942), AC/DC

Compilations

- Through The Years (1991), Studio One
- Best of Dobby Dobson (1997), Super Power
- Greatest Hits (1997), Sonic Sounds
- The Vintage Series (2000), VP
- The Best of Dobby Dobson (2001), TP
