= Archive (The Specials album) =

Compilation album by the Specials
- Released: 26 March 2001
- Genre: Ska
- Label: Rialto

The Specials chronology
Conquering Ruler (2001)	Archive (2001)	The Best of The Specials (2008)

Professional ratings
Review scores
Source	Rating
AllMusic	2.5/5 stars

Archive is a compilation album by the Specials, released in 2001 (see 2001 in music). It consists of old Specials songs and ones by the new line-up, mostly covers.

== Track listing ==
No.	Title	Writer(s)	Length
1.	"Too Much Too Young (Live)"	Jerry Dammers	2:06
2.	"Blank Expression"	John Bradbury, Roddy Byers, Dammers, Lynval Golding, Terry Hall, Horace Panter, Neville Staple	2:08
3.	"Enjoy Yourself (It's Later Than You Think) (Live)"	Conrad Magidson, Carl Sigman	3:19
4.	"El Pussycat Ska"	Roland Alphonso, Clement Dodd	3:39
5.	"Skinhead Moonstomp (Live)"	Alton Ellis, Ney Smith	2:29
6.	"Long Shot Kick de Bucket (Live)"	Dawn Agard, Sydney Crooks, Earl Robinson	3:03
7.	"Conquering Ruler"	Derrick Morgan	3:12
8.	"Do Nothing (Live)"	Golding	3:31
9.	"Nite Klub/Raquel"	Dammers	3:01
10.	"Too Hot (Live)"	Cecil Campbell	2:37
11.	"Skinhead Girl"	Ney Smith	3:31
12.	"Rude Boys Outta Jail (Live)"	Horace Gentleman, Golding, Staple	2:34
13.	"Stupid Marriage"	Dammers, Michael Allen Harrison, Staple	2:48
14.	"Monkey Man (Live)"	Toots Hibbert	2:55
15.	"Decimal Currency"	Blenders	3:48
16.	"Rat Race (Live)"	Byers	2:55
17.	"Dawning of a New Era"	Dammers	2:39
18.	"You're Wondering Now (Live)"	Clement Seymour	2:18
19.	"Napoleon Solo"	Hopeton Lewis	3:08
20.	"Gangsters (Live)"	Bradbury, Byers, Dammers, Golding, Hall, Panter, Staple	2:33
21.	"Braggin' and Tryin' Not to Lie (Live)"	Byers	3:22
22.	"Return of Django"	Lee Perry	3:36
23.	"Ghost Town (Live)"	Dammers	6:37

== Personnel ==
- Terry Hall - vocals
- Jerry Dammers - keyboards
- Lynval Golding - rhythm guitar, vocals
- Neville Staple - toasting, backing vocals, percussion
- Roddy Byers - lead guitar
- Horace Panter - bass guitar
- John Bradbury - drums
