= Greatest Hits (The Specials album) =

Greatest hits album by Neville Staple
- Released: June 27, 2006
- Genre: Ska
- Label: Fantastic Price Records

Neville Staple chronology
The Best of the Specials & Fun Boy Three (2006)	Greatest Hits (2006)	The Best of the Specials (2008)

Professional ratings
Review scores
Source	Rating
Allmusic	2.5/5 stars

Greatest Hits is an album by Neville Staple, former member of The Specials, released in 2006 (see 2006 in music). The cover text is somewhat ambiguous and could be read as The Specials: Greatest Hits, but the album is in fact a collection of new & older recordings by Neville of material previously released by The Specials.

== Track listing ==
1. "Man at C&A" - 2:50
2. "A Message to You Rudy" - 2:47
3. "Rude Boys Outta Jail" - 2:13
4. "Leave It Out" - 3:30
5. "You're Wondering Now" - 2:24
6. "Running Away" - 2:47
7. "Ghost Town" - 5:16
8. "It's You" - 3:14
9. "Gangsters" - 3:16
10. "Simmer Down (Demo Version)" - 4:08
11. "Too Hot" - 2:56
12. "Rude Boy Gone Jail (Demo Version)" - 4:35
