= Magic Car =

British Americana / folk rock band

- Origin: United Kingdom
- Genres: Americana, folk rock
- Years active: 1994–present
- Labels: Tiny Dog Records
- Members: Phil Smeeton; Hazel Atkinson

Magic Car are a British Americana / folk rock band formed in 1994 by the actor Phil Smeeton (songwriter and guitarist) and Hazel Atkinson (vocalist). They signed to the independent record label Tiny Dog Records in 1999 and have released four albums - Yellow Main Sequence (2001), Family Matters (2005), and European Punks (2002), a joint album with Scott 4. A fourth, Meteorites was released in 2016.

== Members ==
- Phil Smeeton - songwriter and guitarist. Also an actor with roles in Judge Dredd (film) and Sharpe's Revenge
- Hazel Atkinson - vocalist
- Martyn West – lead guitarist
- Doug Ebling – drums
- John Thompson – bass. Has also played with Scott 4, Flipron and The Selecter

== Discography ==
=== Albums ===
- 2001: Yellow Main Sequence
- 2002: European Punks - jointly with Scott 4
- 2005: Family Matters
- 2016: Meteorites
