= Starpool =

American ska band

- Origin: Anaheim, California, United States
- Genres: Ska, soul, rock, reggae
- Years active: 2001–2004 (hiatus); 2007–present
- Spinoff of: Save Ferris
- Members: Alan Meade; Bill Uechi; Brian Mashburn; Eric Zamora; Oliver Zavala; Tbone Willy; Evan Kilbourne
- Past members: Phil Hanson
- Website: http://www.starpoolmusic.com/

Starpool is an American ska band consisting of former members of Save Ferris and former No Doubt member Alan Meade. The band's name is taken from a nickname given to trombonist Tbone Willy's house that had a swimming pool shaped like a star, where the band members used to practice and throw parties as Save Ferris. It was also used by the band Save Ferris for their own indie label, Starpool Records, which released the first Save Ferris EP, Introducing Save Ferris.

== History ==
Starpool formed in early 2003 and played their first show at the Ska Summit in Las Vegas. The band released an EP in 2003 titled STRPL E.P.0001 before taking a hiatus in late 2004. In late 2006, the band resumed activity and began playing shows again. They released a single titled STRPL SNGL01 consisting of 2 new tracks in 2007. In 2010, the band released their first full-length album, Living in Transition.

In 2010, drummer Phil Hanson moved his family to Denver, Colorado. In his place is former Save Ferris drummer Evan Kilbourne. Kilbourne played his first show with Starpool on September 18, 2010, at The Grove of Anaheim where the septet opened for fellow Orange County third wave ska legends, Reel Big Fish. On December 30, 2010, Starpool sold out their first headlining show at the House of Blues Anaheim. Starpool returned six months later for another sold out performance at the House Of Blues Anaheim on July 9, 2011.

== Lineup ==
- Alan Meade - Vocals
- Bill Uechi - Bass
- Brian Mashburn - Guitar/Backing vocals
- Eric Zamora - Sax
- Oliver Zavala - Trumpet/Backing vocals
- Tbone Willy - Trombone
- Evan Kilbourne - Drums

=== Former members ===
- Phil Hanson - Drums

== Discography ==
- STRPL E.P.0001 (2003)
  1. "You Know You Want It"
  2. "Despise"
  3. "Try Living In This World"
  4. "New Light"
  5. "It's Alright"
- STRPL SNGL01 (2007)
  1. "Start Again"
  2. "Pump It Up"
- Living in Transition (2010)
  1. "Part of It"
  2. "Ready or Not"
  3. "Pump It Up"
  4. "Start Again"
  5. "Work It Out"
  6. "La Luna"
  7. "Give Me Your Love"
  8. "Don't Know What I Want"
  9. "Falling Down"
  10. "Living in Transition"
