= The Best of The Specials & Fun Boy Three =

The Best of the Specials & Fun Boy Three

Compilation album by The Specials & Fun Boy Three
- Released: February 13, 2006
- Genre: Ska, new wave
- Label: Pegasus Records

The Specials chronology
Stereo-Typical: A's, B's and Rarities (2005)	The Best of the Specials & Fun Boy Three (2006)	Greatest Hits (2006)

Fun Boy Three chronology
The Very Best of the Specials and Fun Boy Three (2000)	The Best of the Specials & Fun Boy Three (2006)

Professional ratings
Review scores
Source	Rating
Allmusic	link

The Best of the Specials & Fun Boy Three is an album by Neville Staple comprising new recordings of the greatest hits of The Specials and Fun Boy Three, released in 2006. The album is simply a reprint of the 2000 album Ghost Town - 13 Hits of The Specials and Fun Boy Three, which had already been reissued as The Very Best of The Specials and Fun Boy Three.

== Track listing ==
1. "Our Lips Are Sealed"
2. "Man at C&A"
3. "A Message to You Rudy"
4. "Rude Boys Outa Jail"
5. "Leave It Out"
6. "You're Wondering Now"
7. "Running Away"
8. "Ghost Town"
9. "T'Ain't What You Do It's the Way That You Do It"
10. "It's You"
11. "Gangsters"
12. "The Lunatics (Have Taken Over the Asylum)"
13. "Too Hot"
14. "Ghost Town" (Chemical Submission Mix)
15. "Our Lips Are Sealed"
