= Checkered Past =

Checkered Past may refer to:

- Checkered Past (album), a 2021 album by L.A. Guns
- Checkered Past (EP), an EP by Save Ferris
- Checkered Past (TV programming block), a TV programming block on Adult Swim
- Checkered Past Records, a record label
- Checkered Past, a 1995 album from The Bob & Tom Show
