= Alexander Burke =

American songwriter (b.1983)

- Born: 1983 (age 42–43); Los Angeles, California, U.S.
- Education: Woodbridge High School; Columbia College Chicago; USC
- Occupations: Musician; Actor; Author; Composer; Producer
- Years active: 1997–present
- Labels: EOne; Orchard
- Website: alexanderburke.com

Alexander Burke (born 1983) is an American musician, songwriter, composer, music producer, television producer, writer and actor. From 2013 to 2016 he was the keyboard player for the band Save Ferris.

== Early life ==
Alexander was born in Los Angeles and grew up in Laguna Beach and Irvine, California with his parents who are both vested in the arts (his father is a well-respected painter and his mother was an art gallery curator before becoming a therapist). His grandmother, Flora Burke, was an accomplished actress (and an early inspiration to Alexander). Alexander always had a passion for music (he was considered a vibraphone prodigy) and while in high school joined Drake Bell’s band Drake 24/7 and went on to perform on the Amanda Show at the Palladium and other high-profile venues around LA and on TV. After high school, he went to Columbia College Chicago, where he became the youngest musical director for the renowned Second City. Alexander was asked to be the musical director for “iO Theater 25 Anniversary Concert DVD” that included performances by Mike Myers, Amy Poehler, Tim Meadows, Andy Dick, Andy Richter and Rich Talarico (Rich later hired Alexander to be the composer of Frank TV on TBS – which would be his first TV gig). While in Chicago he was also busy doing jazz gigs with musicians such as Von Freeman and Chuck Hedges.

== Career ==
After graduating from Columbia College Alexander moved back to Los Angeles, where he studied at the University of Southern California’s film-scoring post-baccalaureate program. After graduation, he quickly found work in television (being hired as part of the house band for the television pilot for Robert Townsend’s talk show “Night of Townsend” on TBS) where he met Eban Schletter (the composer of “Sponge Bob Square Pants”) and Grant-Lee Phillips (who was also part of the house band) and that relationship led to Alexander playing in Phillips' band. These relationships lead to Alexander and Eban being asked to perform with, and open, for Ryan Gosling and Zach Shields' band Dead Man’s Bones. During this time, Alexander became friends with Monique Powell (the lead singer of the band Save Ferris) through his neighbor Abby Travis (the bass player for The Bangles) and ended up playing on records for both of them and later joining the band Save Ferris. Alexander was a member of Save Ferris when they opened for Gwen Stefani at Irvine Meadows and for Mexico City's infamous Ska Festival.

He has also done behind-the-scenes music work, such as being the musical director on the MTV Movie Awards, and co-producing Ben Lee's album Freedom, and the first two Garfunkel and Oates albums.

He co-wrote the songs "Back to the Start" for the Iron Man 3 soundtrack, the song "Love You Like This" for the Jason Bateman movie The Gift, the song "Undercover" for the TV series New Girl, the theme song for the Broadway Video series 7 Minutes in Heaven, and the score for the 2017 documentary film Haunters: The Art of the Scare (as well as serving as its music supervisor).

He played keyboards on Kate Pierson's album Guitars and Microphones, played piano and mandolin on the Billy Ray Cyrus albums Change My Mind and Thin Line (performing with Cyrus live at the Grand Ole Opry, The Tonight Show and at NASCAR to a crowd of over 80,000), played piano on the Dionne Warwick record Feels So Good, performed live with Gary Numan for a “Die Hard” commercial, recorded the double platinum selling Dane Cook album Isolated Incident, accompanied Thomas Middleditch, Ed Helms and Michael Bublé for Bublé's Xmas special, played multiple instruments on Margaret Cho's Grammy nominated musical comedy album Cho Dependent, played synth bass on the David Lynch/Chrysta Bell album This Train, and played with Sharon Jones and the Dap Kings on the Matthew McConaughey led Lincoln television commercial.

Alexander is also an actor, improv coach with Killian Mchugh's Commercial Improv Class and has starred in two television pilots: Hardin High for MTV2 and the Scott Thompson (Kids in the Hall)-produced Husk Report. Alexander also produced the American version of the Japanese anime series Skip Beat for 25 episodes as well as starred as the voice of Sho Devil and was produced by his corporation “Flip the Cat Productions.”

Currently, Alexander is busy with his band Magnolia Memoir, which he writes for and plays the keyboards along with Mela Lee who is the lead singer and co-writer. The video for their single “Odds and Ends” (from the album Pale Fire) has celebrity cameos from Will Forte, Doris Roberts, Fred Willard and Jorge Garcia. Magnolia Memoir has released four albums so far. Alexander is also scoring the Netflix TV series A Mortified Guide, composed two songs for the Sharon Stone film As I Wish and is co-writing (with children's book author Richard Fairgray) a children's book and animated short titled Sweet Penny and the Lion (with music for the short performed by Jill Sobule). He also played on and engineered Sobule's 2018 album Nostalgia Kills.

In 2021, Burke appeared in Alma Har'els concert film featuring Bob Dylan, Shadow Kingdom: The Early Songs of Bob Dylan, where he finger-synced playing the accordion as one of the masked musicians on screen.

In 2026, Burke helped compose music for The Amazing Digital Circus.

Burke's musical inspirations include Jon Brion, T. Bone Burnett, and Jonny Greenwood.
