= Return of Judge Roughneck & Dub Specials =

Studio album by Neville Staple
- Released: February 17, 2017
- Genre: ska, reggae, new wave
- Length: 1:19:21
- Label: Cleopatra
- Producer: Neville Staple, Danny Ray, Christine "Sugary" Staple

Neville Staple chronology
Ska Crazy (2014)	Return of Judge Roughneck & Dub Specials (2017)

Return of Judge Roughneck & Dub Specials is an album by Neville Staple. It is a follow-up album to Ska Crazy. The album was released on Cleopatra Records in February 2017.

== Track listing ==
No.	Title	Length
1.	"Return of Judge Roughneck"	4:23
2.	"Bangarang"	2:59
3.	"Down My Street"	3:19
4.	"Lunatics"	3:14
5.	"Crime Don't Pay"	2:51
6.	"Gang Fever"	3:02
7.	"Politician Man"	2:54
8.	"Maga Dog"	3:13
9.	"Run"	3:14
10.	"Be Happy"	3:11
11.	"Sweet Sensation"	4:05
12.	"Enjoy Yourself" (Ragtime Lounge Mix)	4:03
13.	"Maga Dub"	3:45
14.	"Crime Dub"	4:43
15.	"Roadblock" (Slam Door Dub Mix by Ed Rome)	3:33
16.	"Dub Fever"	4:59
17.	"Jah Baddis Dubplate"	3:04
18.	"Du Street"	5:51
19.	"Bang Bang"	4:22
20.	"Dub Crazy"	5:35
21.	"Legal Dub"	3:01

== Personnel ==
- Neville Staple - guitar, vocals
- Christine Sugary Staple - vocals
- Steve Armstrong - bass, backing vocals
- Joe Atkinson - keyboards
- Matthew Bane - drums
- Mike Bennett - overdubs
- Stranger Cole, Lynval Golding, Frank Guida, Terry Hall, Herbert Madison, Joseph Royster, Carl Sigman, Peter Tosh - Composers
- Fay Elson - backing vocals
- Gareth John, Jon Pudge - trumpet
- Adam Keary - double bass, strings
- Warren Middleton - trombone, backing vocals
- Paul Sampson - guitar
- Billy Shinbone - guitar
- George Sutton - backing vocals
- Daddy Woody - vocals
