= Original Rude Boy =

2009 autobiography by Neville Staple

- Neville Staple on stage with The Specials.
- Author: Neville Staple and Tony McMahon. Foreword by Pete Waterman
- Language: English
- Genre: autobiography
- Publisher: Aurum Press
- Publication date: 2009
- Publication place: United Kingdom
- Media type: Print (hardback & paperback)
- ISBN: 978-1-84513-480-8
- OCLC: 305172668

Original Rude Boy (2009) is the autobiography of Neville Staple, vocalist in ska band The Specials. The book was launched in May, 2009 to coincide with the reunion tour of The Specials. It sets out to chart the black British influence on the second wave of ska which originated in Coventry in the late 1970s — in particular, Staple's involvement in the rude boy scene.

== Major themes ==
In Original Rude Boy, Neville Staple describes the Sound system (Jamaican) scene that developed in Britain in the 1960s and 1970s. He became a DJ with a system called Jah Baddis alongside future Specials road crew members Trevor Evans and Rex Griffiths. Staple candidly describes how he slipped into a life of crime, eventually resulting in his conviction for burglary and a period in borstal. This part of the book has attracted criticism from some ska fans.

At the Holyhead Youth Club in Coventry, Staple first heard a band called The Coventry Automatics rehearsing and became their roadie. After a couple of years touring with them, he joined the band on vocals and they renamed themselves The Specials.

Staple details his involvement in the Third Wave or American wave of ska music. His production work including time in the studio with US ska bands like No Doubt, Unwritten Law and Rancid. Original Rude Boy details how Staple spent several years in California working on various production projects before returning to the UK in 2001.

The Specials announced a reunion tour in 2008 with sell-out UK dates in April and May, 2009. Specials founder member Jerry Dammers refused to join the tour and Staple gives his explanation why Dammers declined to tour with other band members.
