= Scott 4 (band) =

Three-piece indie rock band from London

- Origin: London, England
- Genres: Indie rock, Country rock
- Years active: 1996– present
- Labels: Satellite, V2 Records, Tiny Dog Records
- Members: Scott Blixen; John Moody; Ed Tilley
- Website: http://www.scott4.co.uk/

Scott 4 are a three-piece indie rock band from London, described by Allmusic as 'Electronic cowpunks' for their blend of country-blues, hip hop and indie-punk.

== Career ==
The band was formed in mid 1995 in London, by Scott Blixen (vocals, acoustic guitar, synth, harmonica), John Moody (electric and acoustic guitars, bass, piano, organ, synth), and Ed Tilley (drums, programming, synth), the name taken from an album by Scott Walker. Their debut mini-LP, Elektro Akoustic Und Volkmechanic was released in June 1997, followed by the single, "Deutsche LP Record", which was named 'Single of the Week' in the Melody Maker. Their second album, Recorded in State followed in early 1998 to critical acclaim, leading to the band's signing to V2 Records.

As well as their records being well received, the band quickly acquired a formidable live reputation. Whilst many shows throughout 1995-1999 were played just as the three piece, certain extra musicians became more permanent additions for five piece touring band, those being Mark Rappard (bass) who was replaced in 1997 by John Thompson, and, Graham Thomson (keyboards/acoustic guitar). For one-off shows the number of personnel could vary wildly - Scott 4 supported Stereolab at The Astoria in 1998, with an 11 piece band including Les Hill (pedal steel), Kate Shipway (flute), Tim Kent (banjo) amongst others.

Scott 4's major label debut album, "Works Project, was released in 1999. The initial mini-album Elektro Akoustic Und Volkmechanik had been made in four days in June 1997 on John Moody's four track recorder in the front room of Scott Blixen's North London flat. Recorded In State had perversely already been made at that point, it had taken two weeks to make with Pete Hoffman as co-producer at Milo Studios in London in January 1997. Works Project, in contrast, was the result of six months work from September 1998 to March 1999 in Scott 4's self built studio in Old Street, London ("Systems Pro") with engineer Bob Mallett.

At the end of 1999, after the tours to promote Works Project in UK and Europe, Moody left the band. He formed a new group, Vinyl Exam, who started playing live shows in London from early 2000. Moody also began collaborating with house producer Olivia de Lanzac under the name Maths. The pair released the single "Crayon User"/"Three Parts Boogie" in the summer of 2000. Scott Blixen and Ed Tilley continued as a duo.

The band’s third album European Punks a collaboration with Magic Car, was released on the Tiny Dog Records label.

The band emerged in a new form in 2005 as The Scott 4 Free Rock Orchestra, with a stated line-up of "B-sox, E.T., The Most Emperor Mingus & Billy Ray Sawtooth" when they released the album E-S-P, again on Tiny Dog.

Blixen and Tilley also recorded under the name Man & Woman, releasing a dance single, "Sex on the Minitel" in 2001.

== Discography ==
=== Singles ===
- "Introducing" (1997), Satellite
- "Deutsche LP Record" (1997), Satellite
- "Your Kingdom to Dust" (1997), Folk Archive
- "East Winter" (1998), V2 (promo)
- "Jeans Record" (1999), V2
- "Catastrophe" (1999), Folk Archive/V2 (#125 UK Chart)
- "Lefturno" (1999), Folk Archive/V2 (#181 UK Chart)
- "Meantime" (2002), Tiny Dog (split with Magic Car and Gold is Blue)
- "Pop 'n' Roll" (2004), Tiny Dog

=== Albums ===
- Elektro Akoustic Und Volksmechanik (Mini album, Satellite, 1997)
- Recorded in State (Satellite, 1998)
- Works Project (V2 Records, 1999)
- European Punks (with Magic Car) (Tiny Dog, 2002)
- E-S-P (Tiny Dog, 2005) (credited to 'The Scott 4 Free Rock Orchestra')

==== Track listings ====
Elektro Akoustic Und Volksmechanik track listing:

1. "East Winter"
2. "Work"
3. "Afternoons"
4. "You Set The Scene"
5. "Broken Stones"
6. "I've Been Tamed"
7. "Lucky Strike"
8. "On Off"

Recorded in State track listing:

1. "Start Up"
2. "Deutsche LP Records"
3. "East Winter"
4. "Aspirins"
5. "Your Kingdom To Dust"
6. "Plane"
7. "Cheese Four Tracks"
8. "Miss Goddess No 2"
9. "Zilch (Darkage And Laserfest)"
10. "Choke Bore"
11. "Philly's Song"

Works Project track listing:

1. "Catastrophe"
2. "Troubles"
3. "Hallo Doctor"
4. "Lefturno"
5. "Das Junior"
6. "We're Not Robots"
7. "May Last"
8. "Lilla B-Boy Lullaby"
9. "Scott 4 Travel On Electric Trains"
10. "Applied For Release"
11. "We Scratched Our Names"
12. "Glass & Steel"
13. "7 Days/ I'll See Ya"
14. "Konigskraft"
15. "Ancient & Modern"

European Punks track listing:

1. "European Punks"
2. "Shiny Cattle - Magic Car"
3. "For Teens In The Meantime"
4. "For Teens In The Springtime"
5. "Stillness"
6. "In The Nursery At Night And Further On"
7. "In The Time Of Pop And Roll"
8. "Yellow Main Sequence - Magic Car"
9. "Valhalla"

E-S-P track listing:

1. E.S.P.
2. Welcome The Ants
3. Burn On
4. Cosmos In Our Pocket
5. I Am Mental
6. Indie Again Or
7. Indie
8. Cosmos Jams
9. I is for Understanding
10. Life Is Goo
11. Smile Symphony
