= Modified (album) =

Studio album by Save Ferris
- Released: October 19, 1999
- Recorded: June–August 1999
- Genre: Ska punk
- Length: 45:46
- Label: Epic
- Producer: John Travis

Save Ferris chronology
It Means Everything (1997)	Modified (1999)	Checkered Past (2017)

Professional ratings
Review scores
Source	Rating
AllMusic	3/5 stars
Rolling Stone	2/5 stars

Modified is the second studio album by American rock band Save Ferris, released in 1999.

The album peaked at No. 136 on the Billboard 200. The song "The Only Way To Be" is featured on the 2000 film Scary Movie.

== Critical reception ==
Barry Walters, of Rolling Stone, wrote that "even when the band is rocking full throttle, [Monique] Powell sings as if she's belting out the latest Disney ballad." Entertainment Weekly thought that Powell's "bluesy bluster turns the familiar almost feral."

For AllMusic, William Ruhlmann wrote that "Save Ferris may yet find its own place, but that is more likely to come through touring than through its records."

== Track listing ==
All songs written by Brian Mashburn, except where noted.

1. "Turn It Up" (Mashburn, Monique Powell) – 3:03
2. "The Only Way to Be" (Mashburn, Powell) – 3:18
3. "I'm Not Cryin' for You" – 4:03
4. "Your Friend" – 3:42
5. "No Love" – 4:48
6. "Angry Situation" (Mashburn, Powell) – 3:38
7. "What You See Is What You Get" (Mashburn, Powell) – 3:18
8. "One More Try" – 1:06
9. "Mistaken" (Mashburn, Powell, John Travis, Ed Campwirth)– 3:24
10. "Holding On" (Mashburn, Powell) – 3:26
11. "Let Me In" - 12:03 (includes hidden track "Modified")

== Personnel ==
- Monique Powell – Vocals, Keyboards
- Bill Uechi – Bass
- Eric Zamora – Alto & Tenor Saxophone
- Brian Mashburn – Guitar, Vocals
- T-Bone Willy – Trombone
- José Castellaños – Trumpet
- Evan Kilbourne – Drums
