= Death of Guitar Pop =

British ska band

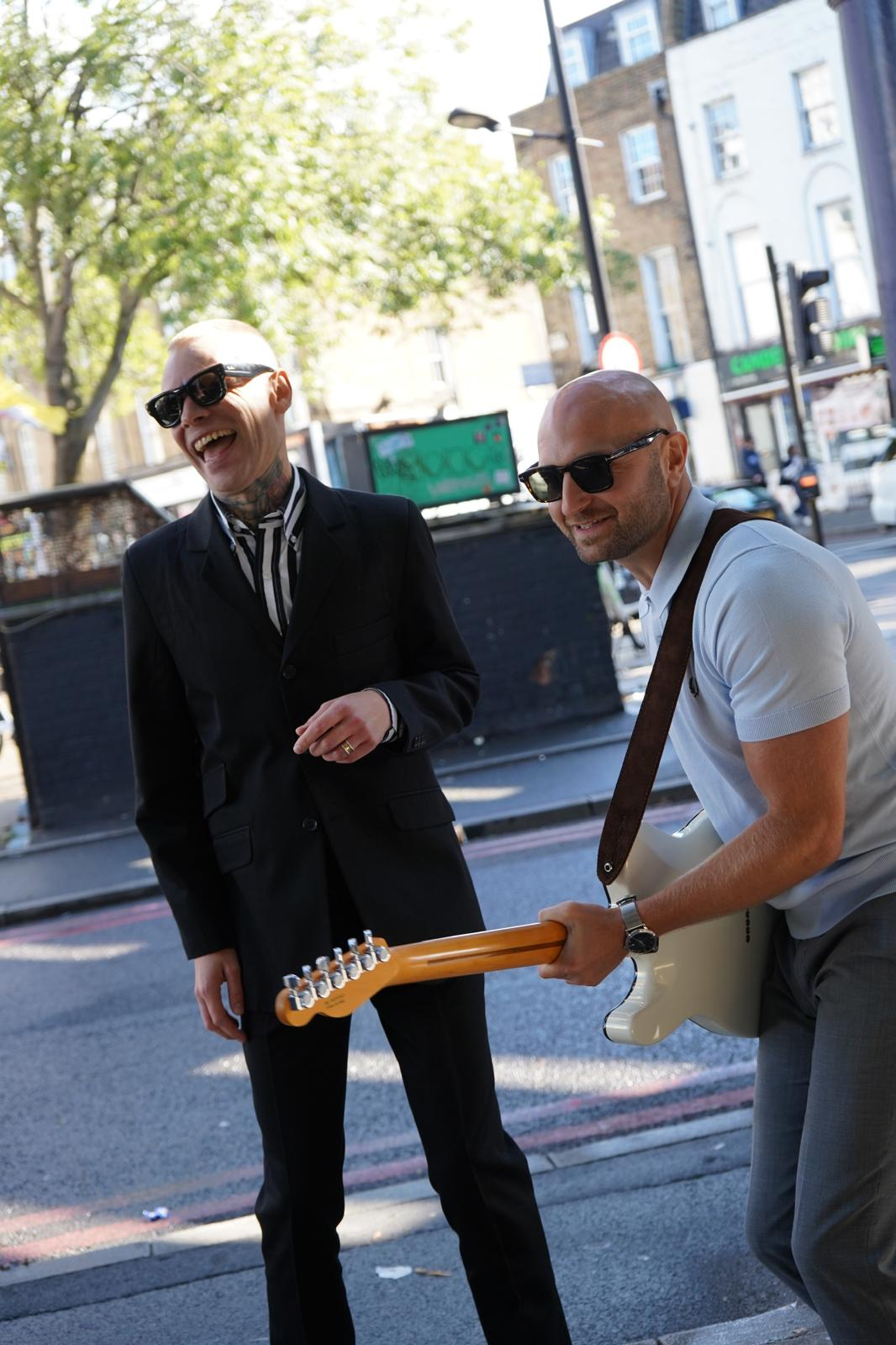
- Oliver and Jonny performing in Camden Town, London

Background information
- Origin: Essex, England
- Genres: Ska revival; pop; punk
- Years active: 2016–present
- Label: Ska Club Essex (independent)
- Members: Oliver "Silky" Hookings; Jonny "Top Kat" Hick

Death of Guitar Pop are an English ska-influenced musical duo from Essex, formed in 2016. The group comprises Oliver "Silky" Hookings (vocals, guitar) and Jonny "Top Kat" Hick (vocals, guitar). They release recordings through their own Ska Club Essex imprint and have issued several albums and singles since the late 2010s.

== History ==
Hookings and Hick began writing and performing together following the conclusion of an earlier project; early recordings and self-released singles appeared in 2016.

The duo's first full-length release, 69 Candy Street, was released in late 2017. In a review for Louder Than War, Nathan Brown called it a "pop influenced take on two tone" which, while appealing to some people, "may not go down so well with your lovers of traditional ska".

Their second album, In Over Our Heads, was issued in 2019. In December 2019 the band released a seasonal track titled "Feeling Like a Right James Blunt at Christmas", featuring James Buckley.

The group's third studio album, Pukka Sounds, was released in 2021 and peaked at number 23 on the UK's Official Album Charts. Their fourth album, Be Lucky, was released in 2023 and peaked at number 30 on the UK's Official Album Charts.

In July 2026, Death of Guitar Pop collaborated with singer Sonny Green on a ska version of the England football song "We're Telling 'Em". The song, which was credited to Green by the Official Charts Company, reached number 43 on the UK Official Singles Sales Chart and number 36 on the Official Singles Downloads Chart.

== Discography ==
=== Studio albums ===
- 69 Candy Street (2017)
- In Over Our Heads (2019)
- Pukka Sounds (2021)
- Be Lucky (2023)

=== Selected singles ===
- "Rickety Old Train" (2017)
- "Suburban Ska Club" (featuring Neville Staple) (2017)
- "Feeling Like a Right James Blunt at Christmas" (featuring James Buckley) (2019)
- "Bosh!" (2023)
