= The Very Best of The Specials and Fun Boy Three =

Studio album by Neville Staple (as The Specials & Fun Boy Three)
- Released: 31 October 2000
- Genre: 2 Tone, new wave
- Label: Cleopatra Records

Professional ratings
Review scores
| Source | Rating |
|---|---|
| Allmusic | 2/5 stars |

The Very Best of The Specials and Fun Boy Three is an unofficial greatest hits album featuring songs rerecorded by Neville Staple, a former member of both bands. The album comprises new recordings by Neville and his band at the time, The Hitmen; no other members of The Specials or Fun Boy Three were involved. Originally released by Anagram (an imprint of Cherry Red Records) in 2000 with the title Ghost Town - 13 Hits of The Specials and Fun Boy Three, the album was re-released by Cleopatra Records under the title "The Very Best of The Specials and Fun Boy Three" and again by Pegaus Records in 2006 as The Best of The Specials & Fun Boy Three. Each release featured a different cover, although the contents are the same.

== Track listing ==
1. "Our Lips Are Sealed" (feat. Jane Wiedlin)
2. "Man at C&A"
3. "A Message to You Rudy"
4. "Rude Boy's Outta Jail"
5. "Leave it Out"
6. "You're Wondering Now"
7. "Running Away"
8. "Ghost Town"
9. "It Ain't What You Do"
10. "It's You"
11. "Gangsters"
12. "The Lunatics"
13. "Too Hot"
14. "Ghost Town (Chemical Submission mix)"
15. "Our Lips are Sealed (Zipper mix)"

== Personnel (partial) ==
- Neville Staple - vocals
- John Avila - bass, vocals, producer
- Chris Colonnier - trombone, vocals
- Jane Wiedlin - vocals on "Our Lips Are Sealed"
