= The Best of The Specials =

Compilation album by The Specials
- Released: 31 March 2008
- Recorded: 1979–1984
- Genre: Ska, new wave
- Label: EMI

The Specials chronology
Conquering Ruler (2001)	The Best of The Specials (2008)	Encore (2019)

Professional ratings
Review scores
Source	Rating
Allmusic	link

The Best of the Specials is a CD and DVD compilation album by The Specials and The Special A.K.A released in 2008. The compilation was re-issued on double vinyl-LP in 2019. It reached number 28 in 2008.

== Track listing ==
=== Disc 1 (CD) ===
No.	Title	Writer(s)	Length
1.	"Gangsters" (as The Special A.K.A.)	J. Dammers	2:48
2.	"A Message to You, Rudy" (as The Specials feat. Rico)	R. Thompson	2:53
3.	"Nite Klub (Album Version)"	J. Dammers, The Specials	3:23
4.	"Concrete Jungle"	R. Radiation	3:19
5.	"Too Much Too Young (Live)" (as The Special A.K.A.)	J. Dammers, L. Chalmers (acknowledgement)	2:06
6.	"Blank Expression"	J. Dammers, The Specials	2:42
7.	"Doesn't Make It Alright"	D. Goldberg, J. Dammers	3:25
8.	"Rude Boys Outta Jail"	L. Golding, N. Staples, H. Gentleman	2:39
9.	"Rat Race"	R. Radiation	3:10
10.	"Man at C&A"	J. Dammers, T. Hall	3:36
11.	"Do Nothing (Single Version)" (as The Specials feat. Rico with The Ice Rink String Sounds)	L. Golding	3:41
12.	"Stereotypes" (Stereotypes/Stereotypes Pt 2)	J. Dammers ("Stereotypes"), N. Staples ("Stereotypes Pt 2")	7:24
13.	"International Jet Set (Album Version)"	J. Dammers	5:37
14.	"Friday Night Saturday Morning"	T. Hall	3:34
15.	"Why?"	L. Golding	2:56
16.	"Ghost Town (Full Version)"	J. Dammers	6:01
17.	"What I Like Most About You Is Your Girlfriend (Album Version)" (as The Special A.K.A.)	J. Dammers	4:50
18.	"Racist Friend (Single Version)" (as The Special A.K.A.)	D. Cuthell, J. Dammers, J. Bradbury	4:02
19.	"War Crimes (The Crime Remains the Same) (Single Version)" (as The Special A.K.A.)	J. Dammers	4:03
20.	"Nelson Mandela (Album Version)" (as The Special A.K.A.)	J. Dammers	4:15

=== Disc 2 (DVD) ===
On Video
No.	Title	Writer(s)	Length
1.	"Gangsters" (as The Special A.K.A.)	J. Dammers	2:54
2.	"Message to You Rudy" (as The Specials Feat. Rico)	R. Thompson	2:46
3.	"Too Much Too Young (Live)" (as The Special A.K.A.)	J. Dammers, L. Chalmers (acknowledgement)	2:05
4.	"Rat Race"	R. Radiation	3:10
5.	"Do Nothing" (Performed on Top of the Pops)	L. Golding	3:20
6.	"Enjoy Yourself (It's Later Than You Think) (Live)"	Madison, Carl Sigman	3:57
7.	"Ghost Town"	J. Dammers	3:40

On Film (as The Special A.K.A)
No.	Title	Writer(s)	Length
8.	"Bright Lights"	D. Cuthell, J. Dammers, J. Bradbury, S. Campbell	3:45
9.	"Lonely Crowd"	J. Dammers, J. Shipley, S. Campbell	3:52
10.	"Housebound"	J. Dammers	4:15
11.	"Alcohol"	J. Dammers	4:56
12.	"Racist Friend"	D. Cuthell, J. Dammers, J. Bradbury	3:29
13.	"War Crimes (The Crime Remains the Same)"	J. Dammers	4:02
14.	"Nelson Mandela"	J. Dammers	4:05
15.	"Break Down the Door"	J. Dammers, J. Bradbury, S. Campbell	2:51
16.	"What I Like Most About You Is Your Girlfriend"	J. Dammers	4:29

=== Vinyl LP [2019] ===
Side one
No.	Title	Writer(s)	Length
1.	"Gangsters" (as The Special A.K.A.)	J. Dammers	2:48
2.	"A Message to You, Rudy" (as The Specials feat. Rico)	R. Thompson	2:53
3.	"Nite Klub (Album Version)"	J. Dammers, The Specials	3:23
4.	"Concrete Jungle"	R. Radiation	3:19
5.	"Too Much Too Young (Live)" (as The Special A.K.A.)	J. Dammers, L. Chalmers (acknowledgement)	2:06

Side two
No.	Title	Writer(s)	Length
6.	"Blank Expression"	J. Dammers, The Specials	2:42
7.	"Doesn't Make It Alright"	D. Goldberg, J. Dammers	3:25
8.	"Rude Boys Outta Jail"	L. Golding, N. Staples, H. Gentleman	2:39
9.	"Rat Race"	R. Radiation	3:10
10.	"Man at C&A"	J. Dammers, T. Hall	3:36

Side three
No.	Title	Writer(s)	Length
11.	"Do Nothing (Single Version)" (as The Specials feat. Rico with The Ice Rink String Sounds)	L. Golding	3:41
12.	"Stereotypes" (Stereotypes/Stereotypes Pt 2)	J. Dammers ("Stereotypes"), N. Staples ("Stereotypes Pt 2")	7:24
13.	"International Jet Set (Album Version)"	J. Dammers	5:37
14.	"Friday Night Saturday Morning"	T. Hall	3:34
15.	"Why?"	L. Golding	2:56

Side four
No.	Title	Writer(s)	Length
16.	"Ghost Town (Full Version)"	J. Dammers	6:01
17.	"What I Like Most About You Is Your Girlfriend (Album Version)" (as The Special A.K.A.)	J. Dammers	4:50
18.	"Racist Friend (Single Version)" (as The Special A.K.A.)	D. Cuthell, J. Dammers, J. Bradbury	4:02
19.	"War Crimes (The Crime Remains the Same) (Single Version)" (as The Special A.K.A.)	J. Dammers	4:03
20.	"Nelson Mandela (Album Version)" (as The Special A.K.A.)	J. Dammers	4:15
