= Ska Crazy =

Studio album by Neville Staple
- Released: May 13, 2014
- Genre: ska, new wave
- Length: 44:41
- Label: Cleopatra

Neville Staple chronology
The Rude Boy Returns (2004)	Ska Crazy (2014)	Return of Judge Roughneck & Dub Specials (2017)

Ska Crazy is a studio album by Neville Staple and the follow up to Staple's 2004 album The Rude Boy Returns. Ska Crazy was released by Cleopatra Records in May 2014.

== Track listing ==
Stir Crazy track listing
No.	Title	Length
1.	"Time Longer Than Rope"	2:38
2.	"Roadblock"	3:26
3.	"The Farmyard Connection"	2:38
4.	"Play a Song for Me"	3:15
5.	"Hypocrite"	3:17
6.	"Jonny Too Bad"	2:59
7.	"Rude Boy Returns"	3:15
8.	"Wet Dream"	3:27
9.	"Rub Up Push Up"	2:48
10.	"Girl"	3:28
11.	"Roadblock" (Dub Mix)	3:31
12.	"The Farmyard Connection" (Dub Mix)	3:25
13.	"Play A Song For Me"	3:16
14.	"Girl" (Dub Mix)	3:18
Total length:		44:41

== Personnel ==
- Neville Staple – vocal
- Stephen Armstrong – bass, guitar, background vocals
- Joe Atkinson – keyboards
- Matty Bane, Trevor Evans, Machine, Winston Marche – drums
- Christine Coffey – vocals
- Gareth John, Jon Read – trumpet
- Warren Middleton – trombone
- Andrew Perriss – guitar, background vocals
- Drew Stansall – alto and tenor saxophone
- Daddy Woody – toasting
- Rob Coates, Tom Lawry – engineers
- James Wilkes, Charlotte Worthy-Jarvis – keyboard engineers
