= Save Ferris =

American ska punk band

- Save Ferris in the 1990s

Background information
- Origin: Orange County, California, United States
- Genre: Ska punk
- Years active: 1995–2003, 2013–present
- Labels: Starpool, Epic, Withyn, Columbia
- Spinoffs: Starpool
- Members: Monique Powell
- Past members: Adrienne Nolff; Brandon Dickert; Adam Bones; Alex Csillag; Max O'Leary; Nate Light; Bill Uechi; Eric Zamora; Brian Mashburn; Jesse Tunnell; T-Bone Willy; José Castellaños; Oliver Zavala; Jimmy Levy; Steve White; Steve Cordero; Marc Harismendy; Evan Kilbourne; Denny Weston Jr.; Joe Berry; Gordon Bash; Patrick Ferguson; Erik Hughes; Adam Plost; Alexander Burke; Scott Jones; Connor McElwain; Richard Velzen; Jonathan Levi Shanes; Alexander Mathias; Jesse Stern; Justin Linn
- Website: saveferris.com

Save Ferris is an American ska punk band formed circa 1995 in Orange County, California, United States. Their name is a reference to the 1986 film Ferris Bueller's Day Off. In 1995, the band began to perform underground venues in Southern California. In 1996, the band won a Grammy showcase award for best unsigned band and a contract with Epic Records. Their album It Means Everything from 1997 was their first full-length album. By 1999, the band moved from ska-pop into pop-punk. After a hiatus, in 2017, Save Ferris released the Checkered Past EP.

The band is best remembered for their 1997 cover of "Come On Eileen", originally by the British new wave band Dexys Midnight Runners.

== History ==
=== 1995–1996: Early years and Introducing Save Ferris EP ===
The band came together after the dissolution of a number of Orange County, California bands. With the band working together under their own “Starpool” label, they began to book shows around Southern California to a great underground response.

The band released their debut EP Introducing Save Ferris on their own label, Starpool Records in 1996, and ended up selling close to 20,000 copies of their EP “out of the trunks of their cars.” That year, Monique Powell provided vocals on the Reel Big Fish song "She Has A Girlfriend Now" from their album Turn the Radio Off (Mojo), which is considered one of RBF's most requested songs to date.

Riding a wave of support from fans all over Southern California, Save Ferris became favorites of KROQ radio's legendary “Rodney on the Rock”, which resulted in regular airplay on LA's world-famous KROQ radio station, possibly being the first unsigned band to do this in LA alternative radio history. Later that year, the National Academy of Recording Arts and Sciences gave the band a Grammy showcase award for best-unsigned band, earning them a recording contract with Epic Records (SONY).

=== 1997: It Means Everything and mainstream success ===
Save Ferris eventually released their debut full-length album, It Means Everything, through Epic, in 1997. The album features several re-recorded tracks from their EP, several new songs, as well as a cover of Dexys Midnight Runners' "Come On Eileen", the 1982 hit which became Save Ferris' most iconic single to-date. It Means Everything's opening track is the single "The World is New," which was featured in the 1998 film The Big Hit (starring Mark Wahlberg), and was also later featured in the trailers for Senseless (1998) and Thomas and the Magic Railroad (2000), as well as an episode of the TV series 7th Heaven.

Save Ferris toured extensively in support of It Means Everything, opening for bands such as Sugar Ray, The Offspring, Goldfinger and Reel Big Fish, as well as two mainstage spots on the Vans Warped Tour in 1998 and 2000, respectively. In April 1998, the band made their television debut on HBO's music series Reverb before making an on-screen appearance in the teen film 10 Things I Hate About You (1999). Their debut album sold over 400,000 copies, and spawned three Top 10 hits in Japan and Mexico. With two singles charting in the Billboard Hot 100, and full rotation on alternative radio globally, It Means Everything was able to achieve platinum certification as per the Recording Industry Association of America (RIAA).

=== 1998–1999: Modified era ===
After the departure of the band's first drummer, Marc Harismendy, in 1998, Save Ferris regrouped and released their appropriately titled sophomore album for Epic records, Modified, in October 1999. The album saw the band moving away from their ska-pop roots and into pop-punk territory. The album also spawned three Top Ten hits in both Japan and Mexico. The song "The Only Way to Be" was used in 2000 film Scary Movie.

Save Ferris supported Modified on tour throughout the next several years including a trek with Lit in the U.S. and a headlining tour of the UK.

=== 2000–2003: Hiatus, and For the Fans tour ===
Save Ferris performed at the 2002 Winter Olympics between the qualifiers and the finals of the Men's Halfpipe at the competition venue in Park City.

Throughout the years, Save Ferris experienced a number of changes in their lineup, most notably the departure of Brian Mashburn, the band's main songwriter, who quit in 2002. Soon to follow Mashburn were Eric Zamora and Bill Uechi, departing to start a new band. Save Ferris announced their breakup in October 2002.

Soon after the departure of Mashburn, Powell self-financed what she called For the Fans, a US tour in 2003, which included a mainstage performance at Ska Summit in Las Vegas for over 10,000 fans.

=== 2004–2012: Post-breakup ===
From 2004 to 2008, Powell appeared on albums by The Used, Lostprophets, Hilary Duff, Goldfinger and others. She also started a now defunct band called The Mojo Wire in 2008, and toured in the LA area.

In 2003, Bill Uechi, Brian Mashburn, T-Bone Willy, Eric Zamora, and Oliver Zavala started the band Starpool with Alan Meade (an original member of No Doubt) on vocals and Phil Hanson on drums.

=== 2013–present: Revival ===
Save Ferris, now led by Powell, went on indefinite hiatus from 2003 until the spring of 2013, at which time Powell once again regrouped the band (with new musicians) and headlined the Pacific Amphitheatre in Costa Mesa, California, to a sold-out crowd of over 7,000 fans, with another sold-out show at the El Rey Theatre in Los Angeles.

The Costa Mesa gig resulted in a lawsuit being filed against Powell by the former members of Save Ferris over use of the band's name, stating that she had not contacted nor invited her former bandmates to perform at the show, although she stated that that was not the case. Powell thus responded with her own countersuit in 2015. Ultimately, Powell won the rights to the band's name, branding, and social media. She was also awarded writing credits on several songs she had previously not been credited on. In October 2015, a public message indicating that the lawsuits between the members had been amicably resolved was posted to the band's official website; this message has since been removed.

Additionally, in 2015, ASCAP songwriting records were updated, crediting Powell as co-writer on a number of Save Ferris songs for which her name had not previously been listed.

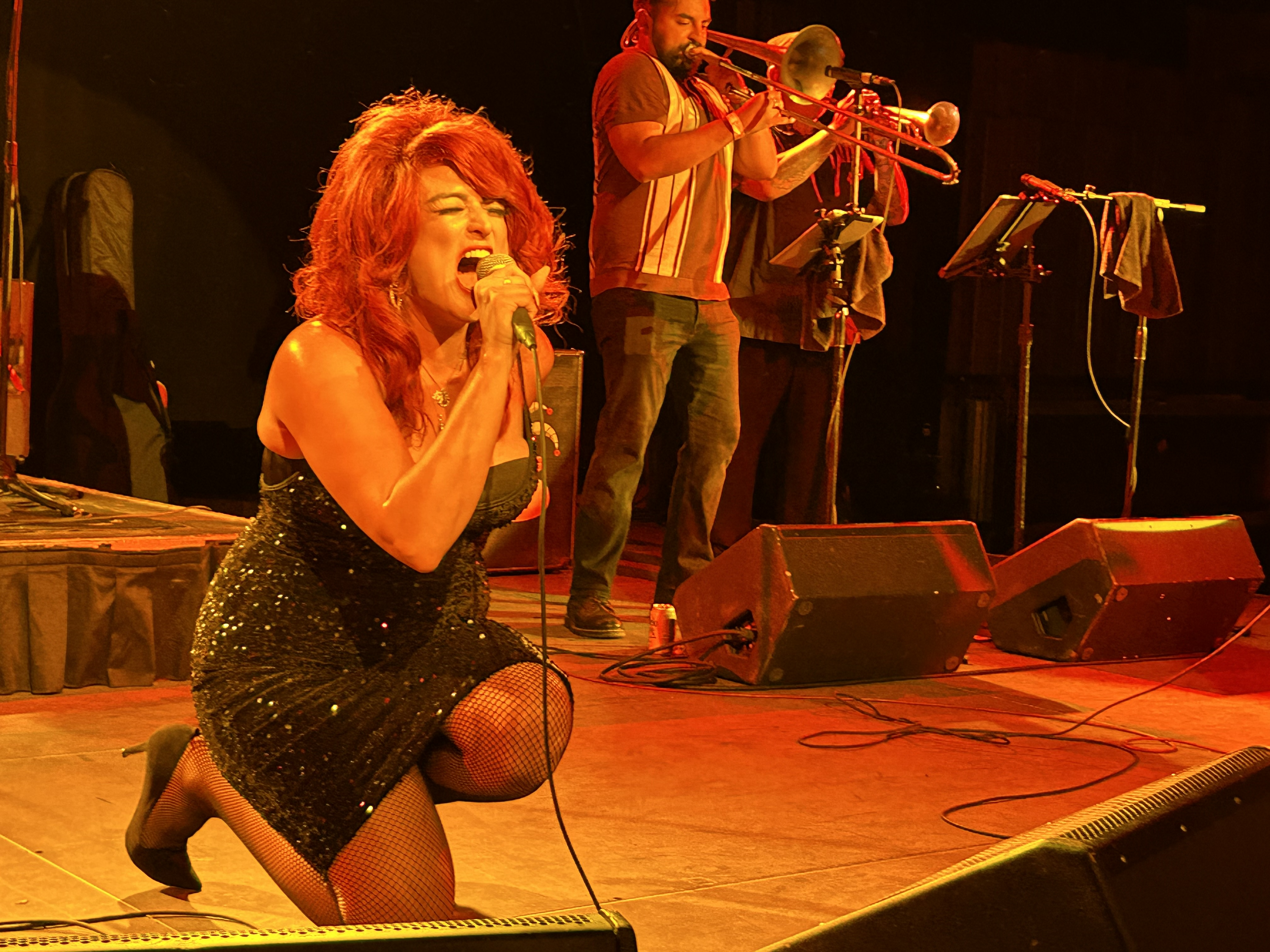
Monique Powell, lead singer of Save Ferris, performs at a gig at the Starland Ballroom in Sayreville, NJ, on August 19, 2023.

In 2016, Save Ferris ran a successful PledgeMusic campaign to raise money for what would be their first new album in over 15 years. The financial goal was achieved in only a couple of weeks, fully funded by the fans. The band co-headlined Mexico City Ska Fest 2016 with the Mighty Mighty Bosstones.

On February 10, 2017, Save Ferris released the Checkered Past EP, their first release in 18 years. The EP was produced by Oingo Boingo bassist John Avila and features a guest appearance by Neville Staple of The Specials on the EP's first single, "New Sound". The band toured for the album in 2017, and took part in the Vans Warped Tour that summer.

Save Ferris released their first Christmas single, as well as their first single in six years, "Xmas Blue", to their official YouTube channel on December 14, 2023. Another single, "Lights Out in The Reptile House", was released on July 19, 2024. On April 29, 2025, the group released the single and music video for a new song called "Get Dancing".

In June 2026, the band released their debut album It Means Everything on vinyl for the first time.

== Lineup ==
Current

- Monique Powell – lead vocals (1995–present)
- A.J. Bartholomew - guitar (2023–present)

Past

- Bill Uechi – bass (1995–2002)
- Eric Zamora – alto and tenor saxophone (1995–2002)
- Brian Mashburn – guitar and backing vocals (1995–2002)
- Jesse Tunnell – trombone (1995–1996)
- T-Bone Willy – trombone (1996–2002)
- José Castellaños – trumpet (1995–2000)
- Jimmy Levy - guitar and backing vocals (1996–1997)
- Oliver Zavala – trumpet & backing vocals (2000–02)
- Adam Plost - Guitar (2000)
- Steve White – trumpet (2002)
- Steve Cordero – drums (1995)
- Marc Harismendy – drums (1995–98)
- Evan Kilbourne – drums (1998–2002)
- Denny Weston Jr. — drums (2013–2015)
- Joe Berry — saxophone, additional guitar and backing vocals (2013–2015)
- Gordon Bash — bass and backing vocals (2013–2017), trumpet (2013–2015)
- Patrick Ferguson — guitar (2013–2017)
- Erik Hughes — trombone (2013–2016)
- Alex Burke — keyboards (2013–2016)
- Scott Jones — trumpet (2015)
- Connor McElwain — trumpet (2015–2017)
- Richard Velzen – trombone (2016–2025)
- Jonathan Levi Shanes – keyboards (2016–2017)
- Alexander Mathias — saxophone (2016–2017)
- Jesse Stern – bass and backing vocals (2017–2018)
- Nate Light – bass and backing vocals (2018–2019)
- Max O'Leary – trumpet (2017–2019)
- Brandon Dickert — drums (2015–2018)
- Adrienne Nolff - co-lead vocals (1995–1996)
- Justin Linn - guitars, vocals (2018–2020)
- Alex Csillag – trombone and keyboards (2017–2019)
- Tristan Hurd - trumpet (2023)
- Jamie Howell - drums (2020-2023)
- Jake Courlang - bass (2020-2023)

== Discography ==
=== Albums ===
Year	Album details	Peak chart positions
Year	Album details	US
1997	It Means Everything: Released: September 9, 1997; Label: Epic; Format: CD, LP	75
1999	Modified: Released: October 19, 1999; Label: Epic; Format: CD	136

=== EPs and other releases ===
Year	Album details
1996	Introducing Save Ferris: Released: 1996; Label: Starpool; Format: CD
2017	Checkered Past: Released: February 10, 2017; Label: Withyn; Format: CD, vinyl, digital download
2024	Lights Out In the Reptile House / Xmas Blue: Released: 2024; Label: Format: 7" vinyl
2025	Get Dancing / Ooh Ooh Rudi: Released: 2025; Label: Format: 7" vinyl

=== Singles ===
Year	Single	Peak chart positions	Album
Year	Single	US	Album
Year	Single	Alternative Songs	Album
1997	"Come On Eileen"	26	It Means Everything
1997	"Goodbye"	32	It Means Everything
1998	"The World Is New"		It Means Everything
1998	"Superspy"		It Means Everything
2017	"New Sound" (featuring Neville Staple)		Checkered Past
2023	"Xmas Blue"		
2024	"Lights Out In the Reptile House"		
2025	"Get Dancing"		

=== Other appearances ===
In 2001, Monique and her family appeared in the unsold pilot for VH1 called Rock Feud, a musical spinoff of the classic game show Family Feud, hosted by former Mad TV cast member Johnny A. Sanchez. Their opponents were Lit.

The following Save Ferris songs were released on compilation albums and soundtracks. This is not an exhaustive list; songs that were first released on the band's albums and EPs are not included.

Year	Release details	Track
1997	Punk vs. Ska, Round I: Released: February 17, 1997; Label: Skratch Vegas; Format: CD	"Artificial Life" (originally performed by Operation Ivy)
1997	The Ska Parade: Runnin' Naked Thru the Cornfield: Released: October 14, 1997; Label: A to Y; Format: CD	"S.Y.L.S.B." ("Support Your Local Ska Band")
1998	Santa's Swingin' Sack: Released: December 1998; Label: KROQ; Format: CD	"Christmas Wrapping" (parody of The Waitresses)
1999	10 Things I Hate About You soundtrack: Released: April 6, 1999; Label: Hollywood; Format: CD	"I Know"
2000	The Real Slim Santa: Released: December 2000; Label: KROQ; Format: CD	"Father Christmas" (originally performed by The Kinks)
