= Conquering Ruler =

Studio album by the Specials
- Released: 13 February 2001
- Genre: Ska
- Length: 52:15
- Label: Receiver
- Producer: Roger Lomas

The Specials chronology
Skinhead Girl (2000)	Conquering Ruler (2001)	Archive (2001)

Professional ratings
Review scores
Source	Rating
Allmusic	2.5/5 stars

Conquering Ruler is a cover album by the Specials, released in 2001 (see 2001 in music).

It is their third album of covers, and their seventh studio album. Like its predecessor, Skinhead Girl, the tracks were recorded at 1993 sessions in the wake of an album backing Desmond Dekker. Only three of the original members of The Specials - Neville Staple, Roddy Byers and Horace Panter participated.

== Track listing ==
1. "Jezebel" (Wayne Shanklin) – 2:33
2. "Tom Drunk" (John Holt) – 3:12
3. "Take Me as I Am" (Jackie Edwards) – 3:17
4. "Conquering Ruler" (Derrick Morgan) – 3:12
5. "Decimal Currency" (The Blenders) – 3:48
6. "Promises" (Clancy Eccles) – 3:16
7. "Double Barrel" (Winston Riley) – 3:40
8. "Keep My Love from Fading" (B.B. Seaton) – 3:33
9. "Rough and Tough" (Stranger Cole, Duke Reid) – 3:23
10. "Foolish Plan" (Johnny Osbourne) – 3:30
11. "I Am a Madman" (Lee "Scratch" Perry) – 4:17
12. "Salvation Train" (Lloyd Charmers) – 3:24
13. "Lorna Banana" (Dennis Alcapone) – 4:49
14. "Return of Django" (Lee "Scratch" Perry) – 3:37
15. "I Don't Need Your Love Anymore" (Dobby Dobson) – 2:44

== Personnel ==
- Neville Staple – vocals
- Roddy Byers – vocals, guitar
- Horace Panter – bass guitar
- Neol Davies – rhythm guitar
- Justin Dodsworth – keyboards
- Leigh Malin – tenor saxophone
- Steve Holdway – trombone
- Paul Daleman – trumpet
- Anthony Harty – percussion, drums
- Roger Lomas – producer, engineer, mixing
- Phil Rogers – design
