= Flipron =

English psychedelic pop band

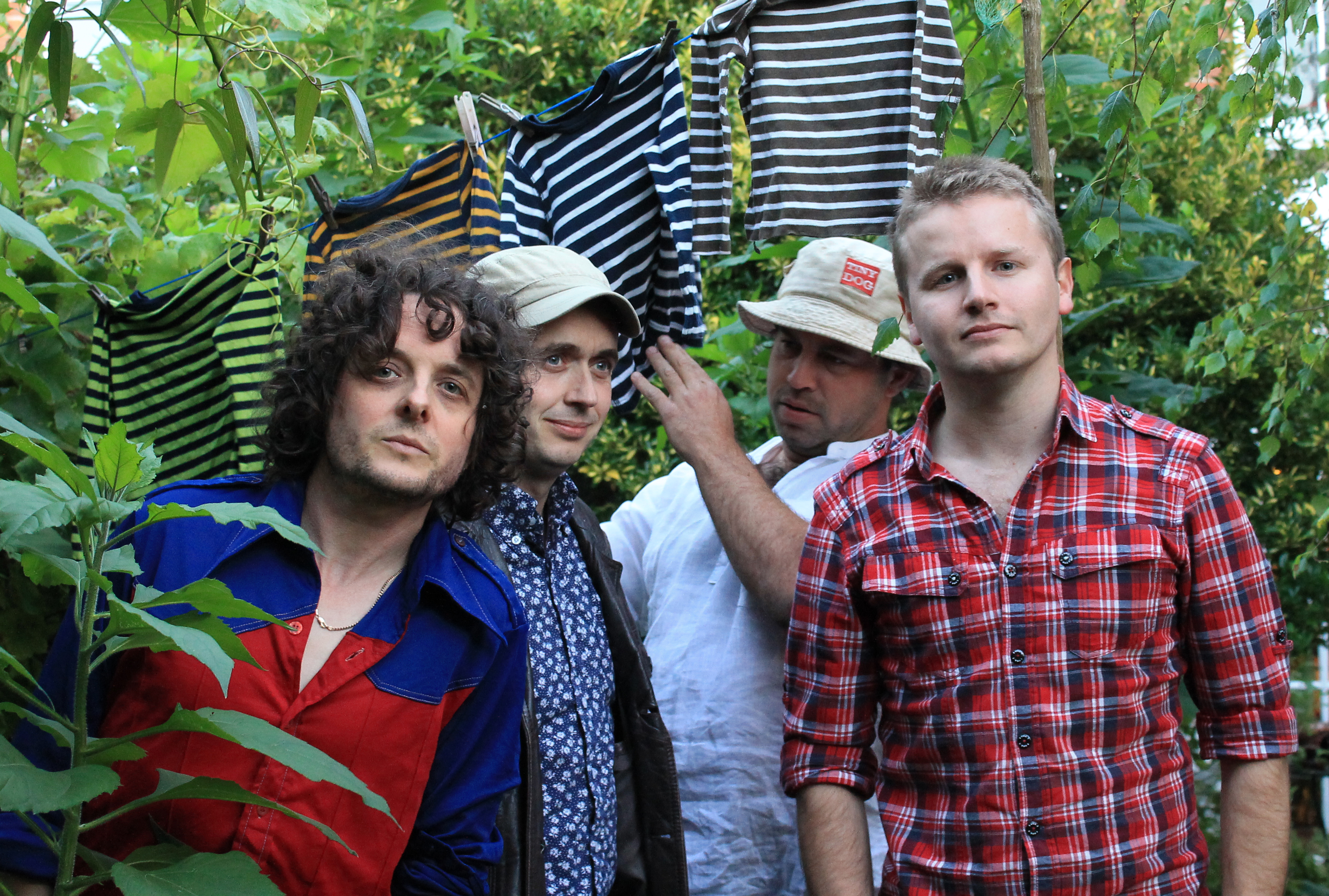

Background information
- Origin: Glastonbury, Somerset, England
- Genre: Psychedelic pop
- Years active: 1999 – present
- Label: Tiny Dog Records
- Members: Joe Atkinson; Jesse Budd; Mike Chitty; Tom Granville
- Past members: Mark Wingfield; Greg Shepheard; Nick Walkling; John Thompson
- Website: flipron.co.uk

Flipron are an English psychedelic pop band from Glastonbury, England, consisting of singer and songwriter Jesse Budd, pianist/organist Joe Atkinson, drummer Mike Chitty and bassist Tom Granville. They were signed to Tiny Dog Records in 2003.Their music has been likened to Tom Waits, Syd Barrett and The Kinks.

== 2004/5: Fancy Blues and Rustique Novelties ==
The first album was recorded in Glastonbury and released in 2004. The Observer Music Monthly magazine put it at number 6 in their 50 albums of the month for October with Charles Shaar Murray giving it a four star review.

In July 2004 they recorded their first live session for Tom Robinson on BBC 6 Music.

As part of the tour to promote the album, Flipron appeared as support act for Donovan (for whom Flipron's Joe Atkinson was playing keyboards) at Cardiff St David's Hall and Bristol's St George's Hall.

Two singles were released from the album; "Hanging Round The Lean-to With Grandad" and "Raindrops Keep Falling on the Dead/The End of Summer". The latter featured an animated black and white video made by American director Alex de Campi.

== 2006/7: Biscuits For Cerberus ==
The second album, Biscuits For Cerberus was mainly recorded at drummer Mike Chitty's house and released in 2006. The Daily Telegraph described it as a "woozy, bohemian pop massacre. Brilliant, but frankly unclassifiable."

In March 2006, they appeared at The Spice of Life in London with Rat Scabies performing The Damned hit "Smash It Up", which was recorded by BBC 6 Music for their Pretty Ancient event (celebrating thirty years of punk).

A single, "Dogboy Vs Monsters" was released in early 2007 and featured a silent movie pastiche video, again directed by Alex de Campi.

Shortly after the recording of Biscuits For Cerberus, bassist Mark Wingfield left the band and Greg Shepheard who had engineered the first two albums joined.

== 2008/9: Gravity Calling ==
The third album, Gravity Calling, was recorded at Chris Jagger's Somerset studio with former Damned drummer Rat Scabies producing. Q described it as sounding like a "more ramshackle Madness" and added the song "How It Works" to their 50 essential download list in their January 2009 issue

August 2008 saw them appearing at the Edinburgh Fringe Festival for five nights at the Gilded Balloon.

On 31 October 2008, they returned to BBC 6 Music for another live session for Tom Robinson. In November 2008, they embarked on a co-headlining UK tour with Birmingham's Misty's Big Adventure and they toured again in spring 2009 with Mark Wingfield returning on bass. Two singles were released from the album, "Book of Lies" and the title track.

In May 2009, they recorded a session for Mark Lamarr's God's Jukebox show on BBC Radio 2 (which was repeated on Lamarr's Best of 2009 show in January 2010).

A range of vintage equipment was used in the recording of Gravity Calling and was featured in Guitar & Bass Magazine's January 2009 edition with interviews with Jesse Budd, Rat Scabies and Flipron manager, Phil Taylor (who also managed Bobby Long).

== 2010/11: The Coolest Names in Showbiz and US tour ==
A new single, the ska flavoured "The Coolest Names in Showbiz", again produced by Rat Scabies, was released in July 2010. The song made its live debut at the Bath Komedia supporting The (English) Beat.

In August 2010, Flipron returned to the Gilded Balloon at the Edinburgh Fringe Festival, this time for a nine-night residency. In September 2010, they toured the US for the first time with John Thompson (who also plays with the current line up of The Selecter) on bass and returned to the US in March 2011 to appear at the South By Southwest festival in Austin, Texas. The single "The Stupidest Face in Town" was released in June 2011.

From 2010 to 2011 live bass duties were shared by John Thompson and Nick Walkling. Tom Granville joined as a permanent member in August 2011.

== 2012/13: Firework Shoes ==
In 2012 they recorded their fourth album, Firework Shoes. As with Gravity Calling, Rat Scabies produced the album and David M Allen mixed it, and backing vocals were supplied by Liz Gilbert. A new single, "The Comet Returns", featuring The Specials singer Neville Staple was released in September 2012. The video for the song was filmed in Coventry at the recently opened Two Tone Village.

Firework Shoes was released on 5 November 2012 receiving a 4/5 review in The Sunday Express by its editor Martin Townsend who likened the band to Madness, Squeeze and XTC

In October 2013 "Big Fat Blackberries" from Firework Shoes was released as a single. In December 2013, "The Comet Returns" from Firework Shoes was used by Channel 4 as the backing music on their trailer to advertise the Christmas Eve Special of cult TV comedy show, The IT Crowd.

== 2014/18 ==
The band kept a low profile in 2014 with Jesse Budd writing and often performing live as his alter ego "Billy Shinbone" in his side project The Billy Shinbone Show. Budd also joined bandmate Joe Atkinson on tour in the Neville Staple Band. Bass player Tom Granville often performs in Nick Parker and the False Alarms.

Flipron appeared at Chagstock in 2014 and the Glastonbury Festival in both 2014 and 2015 (Avalon Café and Bandstand Stages) Also in 2015 the Flipron track "Hungamunga" was used on the "Couples" show on BBC Radio 4 . In 2016 Jesse Budd released a solo single on Tiny Dog Records "If You Think You'll Get Away With It You're Wrong" under the pseudonym The Billy Shinbone Show. In 2017 Flipron played again at Glastonbury Festival & travelled to Italy to play at the Artisti In Piazza festival in Pennabilli. In 2018 both Jesse Budd and Joe Atkinson continue to perform in the Neville Staple Band. In January of that year the band organised a charity show in their hometown of Glastonbury featuring Flipron and The Neville Staple Band in aid of the mental health charity MIND.

Jesse Budd also co wrote and sang lead vocal on two songs of Rat Scabies debut solo album PHD-Prison, Hospital, Debt released by Cleopatra Records and Joe Atkinson also played keyboards on two different tracks of the same album. On 6 July Budd released an eponymous solo album under The Billy Shinbone Show name again on Tiny Dog Records again. It also features contributions from Flipron members Tom Granville and Mike Chitty (under the pseudonym Micky Van Dango)

== 2019-present: The Sinclairs and The Rhynes ==
From 2019 onward, Flipron activity continued to be intermittent, although that year saw the band playing a few shows in their local South West area, with their Glastonbury Festival appearance that year being cancelled at the last minute for health and safety reasons after the roof of the Bandstand Stage was dislodged by the wind.

Various side projects continued unabated. In 2020 another collaboration with Rat Scabies was released. The duo of Scabies and Jesse Budd (using the name Billy Shinbone) released the instrumental album Sparkle under the name The Sinclairs. The album was again released on Cleopatra Records. Its sound was described by www.tinnitist.com as being reminiscent of "classic surf movies, spaghetti westerns, and ‘60s spy movies."

During the COVID-19 pandemic, Flipron released a lockdown video, filmed and recorded on their phones of the song "Ball and Chain" which was originally released on their 2006 album, Biscuits for Cerberus.

In May 2021, Joe Atkinson's side project, The Rhynes, released their self-titled debut album on Tiny Dog Records. Atkinson sang and played guitars, bass and keyboards with Rat Scabies and Matty Bane from the Neville Staple Band on drums. Joe Atkinson and Jesse Budd continued to tour with The Neville Staple Band. Budd also joined Atkinson on bass for live shows by The Rhynes.

In summer 2023, The Sinclairs (Jesse Budd/Billy Shinbone and Rat Scabies) released their second album, The Long Slow Death of a Cigarette. In September 2023, The Rhynes released their second album, Everything the Wrong Way Round.

November 2025 saw the release of the third Rhynes album, Feel So Sure.It again featured Matty Bane on drums with further contributions from Drew Stansall who played saxophone with The Specials and the Neville Staple Band.The album also featured Jesse Budd on lapsteel guitar on the track Down and Way Out.

== Discography ==
=== Albums ===
- Fancy Blues and Rustique Novelties (2004)
- Biscuits for Cerberus (2006)
- Gravity Calling (2008)
- Firework Shoes (2011)

=== Singles ===
- "Hanging Round the Lean-to with Grandad" (2005)
- "Raindrops Keep Falling on the Dead/The End of Summer" (2005)
- "Dogboy vs. Monsters" (2007)
- "Book of Lies" (2008)
- "Gravity Calling" (2008)
- "The Coolest Names in Showbiz" (2010)
- "The Stupidest Face in Town" (2011)
- "The Comet Returns" (2012)
- "Big Fat Blackberries" (2013)
- "Ball & Chain" (lockdown video) (2020)
