= Tiny Dog Records =

UK record label

Tiny Dog Records is a British-based independent record label, located in Shropshire, England.

== Background ==
Founded in 1999, they have released original material by Flipron, Scott 4, Magic Car, The Billy Shinbone Show, and The Rhynes.

Flipron is a psychedelic pop band from Glastonbury, England, United Kingdom. Their music has been likened to that of Tom Waits, Syd Barrett, The Kinks and XTC.

Scott 4 is an electronic band from London, who were previously signed to the major label V2 Records.

Magic Car is from Nottingham, England, and feature the Americana/folk rock songs of the actor and musician Phil Smeeton.
