= It Means Everything =

Studio album by Save Ferris
- Released: September 9, 1997
- Recorded: April–June 1997
- Studio: NRG, Hollywood, Los Angeles, California; The Hook, Hollywood; Front Page, Burbank, California; Sonics, London, England
- Genre: Ska
- Length: 34:43
- Label: Epic, Starpool
- Producer: Peter Collins; Clive Goddard; Save Ferris; Craig Nepp

Save Ferris chronology
Introducing Save Ferris (1996)	It Means Everything (1997)	Modified (1999)

Singles from It Means Everything
- 1. "Come On Eileen" Released: October 20, 1997; 2. "Goodbye" Released: December 1997; 3. "The World Is New" Released: May 1998; 4. "Superspy" Released: August 1998

It Means Everything is the debut studio album of American rock band Save Ferris; it was released on September 9, 1997, through Epic Records and Starpool Records. Save Ferris formed in 1995 after its members appeared in other bands. Vocalist Monique Powell became the band's manager because of her connections in the Orange County music scene. Following the release of their debut EP Introducing Save Ferris (1996), they received radio airplay on KROQ-FM, after which the EP sold 12,000 copies. The band performed at the Grammy Awards, which led to them signing with Epic Records. Their debut album was mostly recorded at NRG and The Hook studios, in Hollywood, Los Angeles, between April and June 1997. It Means Everything is a ska album that includes influences from swing music and has been compared with the works of American band No Doubt.

Music critics gave It Means Everything generally favorable reviews; some reviewers focused on the album's quality and others on the contributions from Powell and guitarist Brian Mashburn. The album sold 13,366 copies in its first week and peaked at number 75 on the Billboard 200. Save Ferris promoted the album with performances on the Warped Tour and through touring with Goldfinger, the Offspring, and Sugar Ray. A cover of the Dexys Midnight Runners track "Come On Eileen" (1982) was released as the lead single in October 1997 and the second single "Goodbye" was released at the end of the year. Following a European tour, "The World Is New" was released as a single in May 1998. After this, drummer Marc Harismendy left the band and was replaced by Evan Kilborne. "Superspy" was issued as the album's last single in August 1998.

== Background ==
While studying at Fullerton College in Fullerton, California, Monique Powell joined the bands Larry and the Shanties. After Los Pantalones broke up in 1995, former members guitarist Brian Mashburn, bassist Bull Uechi, saxophonist Eric Zamora, and trumpeter José Castellaños formed a new band with a new vocalist. When the vocalist left, the other members considered engaging Powell, who they knew from shows with Larry. Despite not previously being a lead vocalist, Powell agreed to join the band on the condition everyone was committed to the band because she wanted to work full-time in the music industry after she quit attending Fullerton. The trombonist left because he did not want to be committed, and was replaced by T-Bone Willy of the Nuckle Brothers, who was a friend of Powell. Drummer Marc Harismendy joined afterwards.

The band was named Save Ferris after the film Ferris Bueller's Day Off (1986). Powell, who had connections in the Orange County music scene because of being in Larry and her contact with Reel Big Fish, became the band's manager. The band's profile quickly rose; they reached headlining status at a point that angered other long-time bands. Save Ferris recorded their debut extended play (EP) Introducing Save Ferris (1996) after Powell's sister paid for the studio sessions. The EP was released through Starpool Records, the band's own label, and was planned to be promoted with "The World Is New" in early 1997. Despite their work not being distributed at the time of its release, the EP gained radio play on KROQ-FM. Although they were unable to keep up with demand, the EP sold 12,000 copies.

== Signing and recording ==
Save Ferris performed at a Grammy Awards showcase for bands and won the final round of the competition, which took place in New York City in February 1997. Senior vice-president of artists and repertoire (A&R) at Epic Records David Massey witnessed this and decided to sign the band, saying it was "one of those spontaneous things. They simply drove the crowd wild." Powell was dismissive, saying since California-based band No Doubt were having success, "all of these A&R guys had very little creativity [on who to sign next]. They were looking for the next female in ska or whatever." After signing in March 1997, the label re-issued Introducing Save Ferris. When radio stations in Southern California asked about a live recording of their cover version of Dexys Midnight Runners' 1982 hit "Come On Eileen", the reception of it saw the band recording for their debut studio album.

It Means Everything was largely recorded at NRG and The Hook studios, in Hollywood, Los Angeles, California, between April and June 1997. "The World Is New" was recorded at Front Page Studios in Burbank, California and The Hook; along with "Superspy", "Sorry My Friend", "Spam" and "Under 21", "The World Is New" was re-recorded during the sessions. Collins produced the tracks except for "The World Is New", which the band and Craig Nepp produced, and "Come On Eileen", which Collins produced with Clive Goddard and the band. Goddard did additional production on most of the songs and acted as engineer during recording. Orchestration was recorded at Sonics studio in London, England, with engineering by Mat Clark. Goddard mixed the album at Record Plant in Hollywood; Greg Collins, Steve Mixdorf, Kenji Nakai and Lisa Lewis served as secondary engineers. Stephen Marcussen then mastered the album at Precision Mastering.

== Composition and lyrics ==
Jennifer Clay of Wall of Sound compared It Means Everything to the sound of No Doubt and said Powell is "more of a long-lost Andrews sister than a Gwen Stefani clone". AllMusic reviewer Stephen Thomas Erlewine said Save Ferris tried to differentiate from their ska-punk contemporaries by incorporating elements of swing music, which he thought was adapted from the work of the Squirrel Nut Zippers. Clay also acknowledged the swing connection, adding with a touch of power pop, "this young gang of seven has created its own ska hybrid". Nude as the News writer David Thomas said the album is "short on punk, sticking to an elemental version of ska"; he said the horn section "itself doesn't try to imitate guitars" as members of Less Than Jake do, instead styling "themselves after big bands from the swing age" of the 1920s and 1930s. Paul Hampton played Hammond organ and electric piano on "Nobody But Me", "Goodbye", "Sorry My Friend", "Lies" and "Little Differences" while Kid Tracy played tenor and baritone saxophone. Clay noted the lyrics involve "meat by-products, spies, and the woes of relationships".

"Nobody But Me" displays Powell's vocal range. "Superspy" is a swing track in the vein of Poi Dog Pondering, on which Powell duets with Mashburn. Save Ferris' version of "Come On Eileen" shifts towards ska compared to the Dexys Midnight Runners original; the staff at Billboard said Save Ferris have a "deft way of serving from jittery guitars to sunny horns" with tempo changes as the "verses dart from a breathtaking pogo pace to the more shoulder-shaking rate of the chorus". Powell became enamored with the song when she was eight years old and was adamant about the band covering it. "Lies" and "Everything I Want to Be" feature string orchestration, the former composed by Simon Warner and Richard Benbow, and the latter by Benbow alone. The orchestration consisted of violinists Howard Gott and Laura Williams, violaist Naomi Fairhurst and cellist Ed Jeffries. Clay said "Lies" "seduces [the listener] with a well-placed string backdrop and horns that seem to weep along with Powell's voice". "Spam", which includes additional vocals from the Starpool Elementary School Choir, is a homage to the food of the same name, which is manufactured by Hormel Foods Corporation. "Under 21" discusses a woman trying to get into a concert for nothing. According to Willy, the band, who do not wish to exclude younger audiences, try to avoid performing at clubs that restrict shows to patrons 21 and older.

== Release ==
It Means Everything was released during the third wave of ska on September 9, 1997, through Epic and Starpool Records. Bradley Bambarger of Billboard wrote Save Ferris would come to define the "sound of young America on the radio this year" alongside other ska acts The Mighty Mighty Bosstones, Sublime and Reel Big Fish. The following month, Save Ferris embarked on a US tour supporting Goldfinger and Kara's Flowers. The album was subsequently promoted with an appearance on Warped Tour alongside performances with The Offspring, Sugar Ray and other acts. "Come On Eileen" was released as a single on October 20, 1997; the US edition included mixes of the song titled "For You" and "night mix", while the French version also included a "day mix" of "Come On Eileen". "Goodbye" was released to modern rock radio stations in the US in early December 1997. In April 1998, the band toured Europe. "The World Is New" was released as a single in Europe with live versions of "Spam" and "Artificial Life", and Operation Ivy cover, as its B-sides. "The World Is New" was released to modern rock radio stations in the US the following month. By June 1998, Harismendy had left the band, saying he wanted to be at home in Artesia, California. He was replaced by Mindrot member Evan Kilborne, who the band met through Home Grown. "Superspy" was released to modern rock stations in August 1998.

== Reception ==
Professional ratings
Review scores
Source	Rating
AllMusic	4/5 stars
E! Online	C−
Pitchfork	9.5/10
Wall of Sound	79/100

Music critics gave It Means Everything generally favorable reviews; some critics focused on the overall quality of the album. The staff at E! Online said the album is a "wild and wacky trip" that "never stops long enough to take a breath". They concluded there is a "definite lack of weight to [the sound of] Save Ferris, however sweet and charming they may be". Pitchfork contributor James P. Wisdom said the album "knocked my socks off" and "pulled me awake with its clean bouncin' groove". Clay was equally enthusiastic about the album, saying "these catchy, infectious numbers teem with enough quirky style to sway even the most stationary" of listeners. Erlewine noted similar to their peers, Save Ferris have a "tendency to wallow in smirking 'irony' ... which may sound good in concert, but it sinks on record".

Other critics singled out Powell's and Mashburn's contributions. Erlewine highlighted Powell for her "energy and charisma", and Mashburn for his ability to compose a hook, citing "The World Is New" and "Superspy" as examples. Thomas said Mashburn's "strictly ska guitar work makes It Means Everything stand out with its own style" and also praised Powell for her voice, which he said is "sultry at times, but more often pleasantly sweet". Megan Frampton of CMJ New Music Report wrote Save Ferris's "strongest attribute is Powell's vocals, and armed with them, this group can no doubt succeed where few ska bands have".

It Means Everything peaked at number 75 on the Billboard 200, selling 13,366 copies in its first week of release. By October 1997, it had shifted 90,000 copies.

== Track listing ==
Writing credits per booklet.

It Means Everything track listing
No.	Title	Writer(s)	Producer	Length
1.	"The World Is New"	Brian Mashburn	Save Ferris; Craig Nepp	2:12
2.	"Nobody But Me"	Mashburn	Peter Collins	3:05
3.	"Superspy"	Mashburn; Michael Horton; Mire Molnar	Collins	3:00
4.	"Come On Eileen" (Dexys Midnight Runners cover)	Kevin Rowland; Jim Paterson; Billy Adams	Collins; Clive Goddard; Save Ferris	4:11
5.	"Goodbye"	Mashburn	Collins	3:42
6.	"Sorry My Friend"	Mashburn	Collins	3:05
7.	"Lies"	Mashburn; Monique Powell	Collins	3:54
8.	"Little Differences"	Mashburn; Powell	Collins	2:42
9.	"Spam"	Mashburn	Collins	2:28
10.	"Under 21"	Mashburn	Collins	2:36
11.	"Everything I Want to Be"	Mashburn; Powell	Collins	3:48

== Personnel ==
Personnel per booklet.

Save Ferris

- Monique Powell – vocals
- Brian Mashburn – guitar, vocals, piano, organ
- Bill Uechi – bass
- Marc Harismendy – drums
- Eric Zamora – alto saxophone
- José Castellaños – trumpet
- T-Bone Willy – trombone

Additional musicians

- Kid Tracy – tenor saxophone, baritone saxophone
- Paul Hampton – Hammond organ (tracks 2 and 5–8), electric piano (tracks 2 and 5–8)
- Simon Warner – orchestration (track 7)
- Richard Benbow – orchestration (tracks 7 and 11)
- Howard Gott – 1st violin
- Laura Williams – 2nd violin
- Naomi Fairhurst – viola
- Ed Jeffries – cello
- Starpool Elementary School Choir – additional vocals (track 9)

Production and design

- Peter Collins – producer (all except track 1)
- Clive Goddard – mixing, additional production (tracks 1–3, 7 and 9–10), producer (track 4), engineer
- Save Ferris – producer (tracks 1 and 4)
- Craig Nepp – producer (track 1)
- Greg Collins – 2nd engineer
- Steve Mixdorf – 2nd engineer
- Kenji Nakai – 2nd engineer
- Lisa Lewis – 2nd engineer
- Stephen Marcussen – mastering
- Mat Clark – engineer
- Bill Uechi – art direction, design
- Frank Harkins – patron of the arts
- Nathaniel Welch – photography

== Charts ==
Chart performance for It Means Everything
Chart (1997)	Peak position
US Billboard 200	75

== See also ==
- Honey, I'm Homely! – album by contemporaries Dance Hall Crashers, released on the same day
