= Checkered Past (EP) =

EP by Save Ferris
- Released: February 10, 2017
- Genre: Ska punk
- Length: 15:43
- Label: Withyn/Columbia
- Producer: John Avila

Save Ferris chronology
Modified (1999)	Checkered Past (2017)

Singles from Checkered Past
- 1. "New Sound" Released: 2017

Professional ratings
Review scores
Source	Rating
Punknews.org	2/5 stars

Checkered Past is an EP by ska punk band Save Ferris that was released on February 10, 2017, on Withyn Records. The EP marks the band's first release in 18 years since 1999's Modified and their first since lead singer and founding member Monique Powell reformed the band with a brand new lineup after years of legal battles with the former members of the band. The EP was produced by Oingo Boingo bassist John Avila and features a guest appearance by Neville Staple of The Specials on the EP's first single, "New Sound".

== Track listing ==
All songs written by Monique Powell, except where noted.

1. "Anything" – 2:44
2. "New Sound" (Powell, Patrick Ferguson) – 3:32
3. "Golden Silence" – 3:08
4. "Do I Even Like You?" – 2:32
5. "Goodbye Brother" – 3:47

== Personnel ==
- Monique Powell – lead vocals
- Gordon Bash – bass and backing vocals
- Patrick Ferguson – guitar
- Richard Velzen – trombone
- Jonathan Levi Shanes – keyboards
- Brandon Dickert – drums
- Connor McElwain – trumpet
- Alexander Mathias – saxophone
- Joe Berry – additional saxophone
