= Neville Staple =

British singer (born 1955)

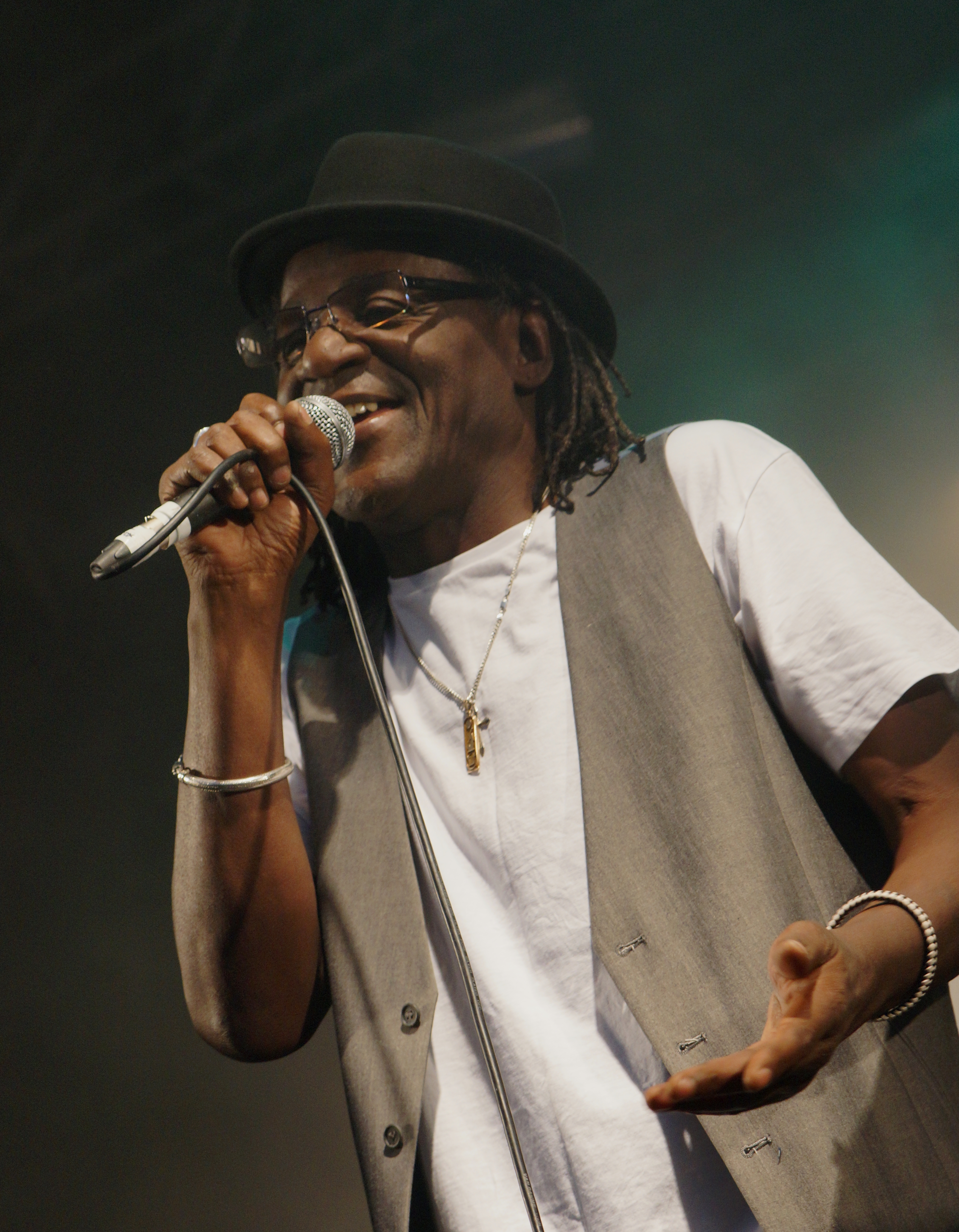
- Staple performing in 2012

Background information
- Born: Neville Eugenton Staple; 11 April 1955 (age 71); Manchester Parish, Jamaica
- Origin: Coventry, England
- Genres: 2 Tone; ska; new wave
- Occupation: Singer
- Instruments: Vocals; percussion
- Years active: 1977–present
- Labels: 2 Tone; Chrysalis; Cleopatra
- Website: originalrudeboy.co.uk

Neville Eugenton Staple (born 11 April 1955), sometimes credited as Neville Staples, is a Jamaican-born British singer, known for his work with the 2-tone ska band the Specials, the pop group Fun Boy Three, as well as with his own group, the Neville Staple Band. He also performed with Ranking Roger in the supergroup Special Beat.

== Early life ==
Staple was born in Manchester, Jamaica. He left Jamaica to live in the English town of Rugby, Warwickshire at the age of five but later moved to Coventry. He was a regular fixture at the Locarno Ballroom in Coventry, where he met the resident DJ there, Pete Waterman. Waterman briefly managed the Specials and would later write the foreword to Staple's 2009 biography, Original Rude Boy.

Staple's early vocal style was mostly "toasting"—or chanting over a rhythm—a forerunner of rapping brought to Britain in the 1960s by musicians from Jamaica. Staple honed his toasting skills in the sound system scene in Coventry during the 1970s, first on his cousin's "Messenger Sound" and later his own system called "Jah Baddis".

== Career ==
=== The Specials ===
Staple's first involvement with the Specials was when they were still called the Coventry Automatics. Initially employed as their roadie, Staple joined the band on stage at a gig supporting the Clash. At that point, the line-up already included Jerry Dammers, Horace Panter and Silverton Hutchinson on drums. Terry Hall subsequently came in as vocalist, replacing Tim Strickland, and Roddy Radiation joined on lead guitar. John Bradbury would later take over on drums from Silverton.

In the Specials, Staple sang lead vocals on some tracks or additional and backing vocals alongside Terry Hall's lead. He also contributed to the writing of many of their songs, but rarely received credit.

The Specials were managed for a time by the Clash's manager, Bernard Rhodes, whom Staple toasted in the phrase "Bernie Rhodes knows don't argue" at the beginning of the Specials' hit single "Gangsters".

=== Fun Boy Three ===
When the Specials initially split up, Staple departed with Terry Hall and Lynval Golding to form Fun Boy Three. They had a string of chart hits, some in collaboration with the all-female trio Bananarama.

=== Third wave of ska ===
In 1990, Staple joined Ranking Roger from the Beat to form Special Beat, a revival group playing hits from both former 2 Tone bands the Specials and the Beat. This was in response to the huge explosion of interest in ska in the United States—the so-called "Third Wave" of ska. Neville moved to California in the 1990s to work with many of these new American ska and punk acts, including No Doubt, Rancid and Unwritten Law. Neville also featured on the song "Explosive" by Canadian ska band The Planet Smashers.

Staple participated in a reunion line-up of the Specials from 1993 to 2001, and again from 2009 to 2012, after which he left the band due to mostly personal reasons, as well as some health concerns.

In 2000, Staple's re-recordings of hits by the Specials and Fun Boy Three were released as The Very Best of the Specials and Fun Boy Three, without being prominently labelled as a solo work by Staple.

== Solo career ==
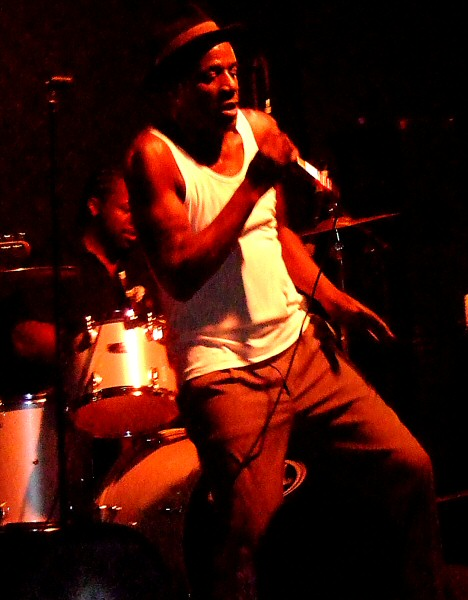
Neville Staple (Dundee Doghouse, 2007)

Staple worked for many years in the US with various bands, including the Hitmen, the team providing the soundtrack for the 2003 movie Vampires Anonymous. Since 2004, he has toured the UK, Europe, Middle East, Australia and New Zealand with his own band, as well as several successful tours and shows alongside Ranking Roger of the Beat and Pauline Black of the Selecter, as Special Beat and Legends of Ska, respectively. He also helped to launch the career of Johnny Zee (aka Taz of Stereo Nation) of Bollywood music fame, after managing and producing him early on.

In 2004, Staple returned to the UK and formed the Neville Staple Band, releasing the critically acclaimed album The Rude Boy Returns, with contributions from Clash guitarist Mick Jones and Damned drummer Rat Scabies. The group featured former members of the British ska band Bad Manners, with Warren Middleton on trombone (later replaced by Spencer Hague), Stephen Armstrong on bass guitar, Matty Bane on drums and Andy Perriss on guitar, as well as Joe Atkinson from Flipron on keyboards/organ and occasionally Patrick Pretorius from the Talks on drums.

=== Biography ===
In April 2009, Staple set out on a reunion tour with the Specials. The same month also saw the launch of his biography, Original Rude Boy, published by Aurum Press. The book covers Staple's childhood in Jamaica and early involvement with the 1970s sound system scene, as well as his work with the Specials and Fun Boy Three. Neville collaborated with former BBC journalist Tony McMahon on the book and both are registered with the Blake Friedmann literary agency.

=== Later career ===
In December 2013, Perriss decided to leave the Neville Staple Band after more than 12 years, replaced by Billy Shinbone on guitar.

In May 2014, Staple released Ska Crazy with his band, which included classic ska covers and brand new material. His wife Christine Staple and long-time friend Daddy Woody, a Jamaican DJ/artist, also provide vocals on the album.

Staple has also worked on various collaborations with the Mutants, including co-writing four tracks on the album Rhythm and Punk Review (one of them co-written with his wife Christine), as well as with the Talks Flipron, Dub Pistols and Duplex. In 2015, Staple produced his wife Christine's EP Rudegirl Sounds. Christine began performing with the Neville Staple Band that same year.

From 2016 onward, Staple has continued to collaborate with other artists, including Save Ferris, the Rifffs, Jessy Greene and Ed Rome, and has toured extensively across the UK, Europe, Australia, Hong Kong and the US. Return of Judge Roughneck & Dub Specials was released in February 2017 and was co-produced with Tom Lowry from Planet Studios and Staple's wife Christine, who also co-writes and performs songs with him. The lead track video was premiered by Vive Le Rock magazine and the album received positive reviews. Staple recreated his famous Judge Roughneck character, first heard as part of the "Stupid Marriage" song on the Specials' debut album on 2-Tone Records. The second half of the album consists of dub music.

In 2018, another joint album with Christine Sugary Staple, Rude Rebels, was released, including collaborations with former Specials bandmate Roddy "Radiation" Byers.

Staple toured with his band celebrating '40 Years of Ghost Town'. The current Neville Staple Band line-up consists of Christine "Sugary" Staple on vocals, ex-Specials member Drew Stanshall on saxophone, ex-Bad Manners members Matty "Bingo" Bane on drums and Stephen "Sledge" Armstrong on bass, as well as Billy Shinbone on guitar, Joe Atkinson on keyboards and Pete New on trombone.

In January 2024, Staple announced that he had been diagnosed with a serious heart defect, and was therefore cancelling all future live performances.

== Solo discography ==
=== Albums ===
- 1994 – Skanktastic (Six-song EP) (Moon Records)
- 2000 – Ghost Town: 13 Hits of the Specials and Fun Boy Three (Anagram – Cherry Red Records)
- 2001 – Neville Staple from the Specials (525 Music Production)
- 2002 – Ska Au Go-Go (as "Special Skank Ft. Neville Staple") (Cleopatra)
- 2004 – The Rude Boy Returns (Rude Boy Records)
- 2005 – The Rude Boy Returns: Neville Staple Live (DVD) (Asian Man Records)
- 2006 – The Specials: Greatest Hits (Fantastic Price Records)
- 2014 – Ska Crazy (Cleopatra)
- 2017 – Return of Judge Roughneck & Dub Specials (Cleopatra)
- 2018 – Rude Rebels (as "Neville & Sugary Staple Featuring Roddy Radiation") (Cleopatra)
- 2021 – From the Specials & Beyond (Cleopatra)

=== Compilations and guest appearances ===
Artist	Title	Release date	Label	Details
Various Artists	The Sound of Ska	1989	Music Factory	Toasting on "The Sound of Ska Medley"
Various Artists	The Shack	1993	BiB Records	"Rude Boy De Ponporbation (007)" credited to "Neville Staple aka Judge Roughneck"; "Why?" and "Wear You to the Ball" credited to Neville Staple and Lynval Golding (both tracks actually Specials/Fun Boy Three demos)
The Soup Dragons	Hydrophonic	1994	PolyGram	Toasting on "Rest in Peace", joined by Lynval Golding on guitar.
Desorden Publico	Diablo	2000	Guerra Sound Records	Appears on "Black Market Man"
Various Artists	Off the Wall, Volume IV – A Collection of Vans' Music	2001	Vans Records	"Mess With Me" credited to Neville Staple & The Hitmen
Unwritten Law	Elva	2002	Interscope Records	DJ vocal on "Evolution"
Various Artists	Vampires Anonymous (Soundtrack)	2003	N/A	"Working Hard", "What Can I Do", "Take a Look at Me", "Pressure Drop" credited to Neville Staple & The Hitmen (all songs written by Neville Staple and Miles Woodroffe except "Pressure Drop"). Neville also cameos in the film.
The Planet Smashers	Mighty	2003	Golf/Stomp Records	Appears on and co-wrote the track "Explosive"
Various Artists	The Dawning of a New Era (Mojo, May 2008)	2008	Mojo magazine	"Gangsters" credited to Neville Staple
The Talks	West Sinister	2012	AOO Records	Vocal on "Can Stand the Rain"
Flipron	Firework Shoes	2012	Tiny Dog Records	Vocal on "The Comet Returns"
Dub Pistols	Return of the Pistoleros	2015	Sunday Best	
Save Ferris	Checkered Past	2017	Withyn Records	Vocal on "New Sound"
Death of Guitar Pop	Suburban Ska Club	2017	Ska Club Essex	Also makes an appearance in the music video
The Red Stripes	In the Ska East	2018	Mod Sound Records	Vocal on "Hong Kong Special"
