= Chris Rea discography =

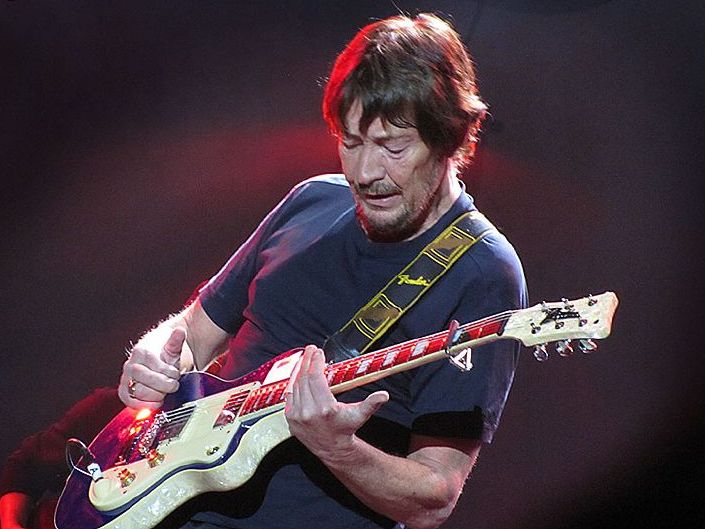
- Rea performing in 2010
- Studio albums: 25
- Soundtrack albums: 1
- Live albums: 1
- Compilation albums: 14
- Singles: 72

The discography of the British rock and blues musician Chris Rea consists of 25 studio albums, 14 compilation albums, one live album, one soundtrack album, and 72 singles—including thirty-two UK Top 75s, and thirteen Top 40s, and two Top 10s hit singles, including Driving Home for Christmas (originally released 1988, peaked only in 2021) and The Road to Hell (1989). He had fourteen UK Top 20s albums, nine of them in the Top 10s, six in the Top 5s, including two No. 1s, that being The Road to Hell (1989) and Auberge (1991).

== Discography ==
=== Studio albums ===
Title	Album details	Peak chart positions										Certifications
Title	Album details	UK	AUS	AUT	FRA	GER	NLD	NOR	SWE	SWI	US	Certifications
Whatever Happened to Benny Santini?	Released: April 1978; Label: Magnet	—	94	—	—	—	—	—	—	—	49	RIAA: Gold
Deltics	Released: March 1979; Label: Magnet	54	27	—	—	—	—	—	—	—	—	
Tennis	Released: March 1980; Label: Magnet	60	60	—	—	—	—	—	—	—	—	
Chris Rea	Released: March 1982; Label: Magnet	52	—	—	—	—	—	—	—	—	—	
Water Sign	Released: March 1983; Label: Magnet	64	60	—	—	30	33	—	7	—	—	
Wired to the Moon	Released: April 1984; Label: Magnet	35	—	—	—	17	25	16	13	—	—	
Shamrock Diaries	Released: 17 May 1985; Label: Magnet	15	41	—	—	12	3	—	19	18	—	BPI: Silver
On the Beach	Released: 14 April 1986; Label: Magnet	11	37	20	—	2	1	7	11	10	—	BPI: Platinum
Dancing with Strangers	Released: 14 September 1987; Label: Magnet	2	7	13	—	5	7	6	7	7	—	BPI: Platinum
The Road to Hell	Released: 30 October 1989; Label: Magnet / WEA	1	35	2	—	3	43	3	2	6	107	BPI: 6× Platinum; MC: Gold
Auberge	Released: 25 February 1991; Label: EastWest / WEA	1	53	5	—	1	9	3	5	2	176	BPI: 2× Platinum
God's Great Banana Skin	Released: 2 November 1992; Label: EastWest	4	137	26	—	16	33	14	18	16	—	BPI: Platinum
Espresso Logic	Released: 1 November 1993; Label: EastWest	8	109	16	—	14	46	—	29	24	—	BPI: Gold
The Blue Cafe	Released: 19 January 1998; Label: EastWest	10	178	20	43	7	32	32	43	28	—	BPI: Silver
The Road to Hell: Part 2	Released: 8 November 1999; Label: EastWest	54	—	—	—	16	—	—	—	96	—	BPI: Silver
King of the Beach	Released: October 2000; Label: Magnet / EastWest	26	—	13	—	11	—	—	—	29	—	
Dancing Down the Stony Road	Released: September 2002; Label: Jazzee Blue / Edel	14	—	18	115	11	21	—	29	28	—	BPI: Gold
Blue Street (Five Guitars)	Released: 28 July 2003; Label: Jazzee Blue	179	—	—	—	—	—	—	—	—	—	
Hofner Blue Notes	Released: 28 July 2003; Label: Jazzee Blue	—	—	—	—	—	—	—	—	—	—	
The Blue Jukebox	Released: March 2004; Label: Jazzee Blue	27	—	41	133	30	32	—	—	49	—	
Blue Guitars	Released: October 2005; Label: Ear Books / Edel	85	—	—	180	—	29	—	—	—	—	
The Return of the Fabulous Hofner Bluenotes	Released: 10 February 2008; Label: Ear Books / Edel	—	—	—	—	—	76	—	—	—	—	
Santo Spirito Blues	Released: 5 September 2011; Label: Rhino	13	—	30	35	10	44	27	—	31	—	
Road Songs for Lovers	Released: 29 September 2017; Label: Jazzee Blue / BMG	11	—	22	188	19	52	—	—	18	—	
One Fine Day	Released: 4 October 2019; Label: Warner Music	—	—	—	—	—	—	—	—	—	—	
"—" denotes a recording that did not chart or was not released in that territory.

=== Live albums ===
Title	Album details	Peak chart positions		
Title	Album details	UK	GER	NLD
The Road to Hell and Back	Released: October 2006; Label: Jazzee Blue / Polydor	34	18	73

=== Compilation albums ===
Title	Album details	Peak chart positions										Certifications
Title	Album details	UK	AUS	AUT	FIN	GER	NLD	NOR	SWE	SWI	US	Certifications
Herzklopfen (Germany only)	Released: 1986; Label: PolyGram	—	—	—	—	5	—	—	—	—	—	BVMI: Gold
New Light Through Old Windows	Released: 17 October 1988; Label: Magnet / WEA	5	14	7	—	9	59	15	29	24	92	BPI: 3× Platinum
The Best of Chris Rea	Released: 24 October 1994; Label: EastWest	3	73	—	—	4	35	7	7	6	—	BPI: Platinum
The Best of Chris Rea	Released: 15 December 1998; Label: EastWest	165	—	—	—	—	—	—	—	—	—	
The Very Best of Chris Rea	Released: November 2001; Label: Magnet / EastWest	69	—	—	5	60	—	16	—	40	—	BPI: Gold
Heartbeats – Chris Rea's Greatest Hits	Released: 2005; Label: Warner Strategic Marketing	24	—	—	35	—	—	—	—	54	—	BPI: Silver
The Platinum Collection	Released: 2006; Label: Rhino / Warner Platinum	—	—	—	—	—	—	—	—	—	—	BPI: Silver
The Ultimate Collection 1978–2000	Released: 2007; Label: Crimson	186	—	—	—	—	—	—	—	—	—	
The Works	Released: 2007; Label: Rhino	—	—	—	—	—	84	—	—	—	—	
Fool (If You Think It's Over)	Released: 2008; Label: Edel	—	—	—	—	98	—	—	—	98	—	
Still So Far to Go – The Best of Chris Rea	Released: 5 October 2009; Label: Rhino / Jazzee Blue	8	—	—	—	37	—	—	10	—	—	BPI: Gold
The Journey 1978–2009	Released: 3 October 2011; Label: Music Club Deluxe	66	—	—	—	—	—	—	—	—	—	BPI: Gold
The Best	Released: 28 September 2018; Label: Jazzee Blue	—	—	—	—	—	—	—	—	—	—	
Era 1: 1978–1984	Released: 20 November 2020; Label: Magnet	—	—	—	—	—	—	—	—	—	—	
The Christmas Album	Released: 17 October 2025; Label: Magnet	—	—	—	—	—	—	—	—	61	—	
"—" denotes a recording that did not chart or was not released in that territory.

=== Soundtrack albums ===
Title	Album details	Peak chart positions			Certifications
Title	Album details	UK	AUT	GER	Certifications
La Passione	Released: 11 November 1996; Label: EastWest	43	44	60	BPI: Silver

=== Singles ===
Year	Title	Peak chart positions										Album
Year	Title	UK	AUS	AUT	BEL (FL)	FRA	GER	NLD	NZ	SWI	US	Album
1974	"So Much Love"	—	—	—	—	—	—	—	—	—	—	Non-album single
1978	"Fool (If You Think It's Over)"	30	39	—	—	—	—	30	31	—	12	Whatever Happened to Benny Santini?
1978	"Whatever Happened to Benny Santini?"	—	—	—	—	—	—	—	—	—	71	Whatever Happened to Benny Santini?
1979	"Diamonds"	44	13	—	—	—	—	—	—	—	44	Deltics
1979	"Raincoat and a Rose"	—	—	—	—	—	—	—	—	—	—	Deltics
1980	"Tennis"	— (Note: This single did not enter the UK Singles Chart, but did reach number 117 on the Record Business Singles Chart.)	88	—	—	—	—	—	—	—	—	Tennis
1980	"Dancing Girls"	—	—	—	—	—	—	—	—	—	—	Tennis
1982	"Loving You"	65	—	—	—	—	—	—	—	—	88	Chris Rea
1982	"Every Beat of My Heart"	— (Note: This single did not enter the UK Singles Chart, but did reach number 129 on the Record Business Bubbling Under Singles Chart.)	53	—	—	—	—	39	—	—	—	Chris Rea
1983	"Let It Loose"	85	—	—	—	—	—	—	—	—	—	Water Sign
1983	"I Can Hear Your Heartbeat"	60	42	—	15	—	—	25	46	—	—	Water Sign
1983	"Hey You"	—	—	—	—	—	—	—	—	—	—	Water Sign
1983	"Love's Strange Ways"	123	—	—	—	—	—	—	—	—	—	Water Sign
1984	"I Don't Know What It Is But I Love It"	65	—	—	—	—	—	—	—	—	—	Wired to the Moon
1984	"Bombollini"	154	—	—	—	—	—	—	—	—	—	Wired to the Moon
1984	"Touche D'Amour"	86	—	—	40	—	46	—	—	—	—	Wired to the Moon
1984	"Ace of Hearts"	79	—	—	—	—	—	—	—	—	—	Wired to the Moon
1985	"Stainsby Girls"	26	94	—	33	—	—	—	—	—	—	Shamrock Diaries
1985	"Josephine"	67	79	—	13	—	31	8	—	—	—	Shamrock Diaries
1985	"All Summer Long"	—	—	—	32	—	---	—	—	—	—	Shamrock Diaries
1985	"Ace of Hearts" (re-issue)	78	—	—	—	—	—	—	—	—	—	Wired to the Moon
1986	"It's All Gone"	69	—	—	32	—	---	—	—	—	—	On the Beach
1986	"On the Beach"	57	88	—	—	48	—	34	—	—	—	On the Beach
1986	"Hello Friend" (re-recording)	79	—	—	—	—	—	—	—	—	—	On the Beach
1987	"Let's Dance"	12	9	—	—	19	19	—	2	22	81	Dancing with Strangers
1987	"Josephine (remix)"	—	—	—	—	4	—	—	—	—	—	Non-album single
1987	"Loving You Again"	47	75	—	35	—	43	33	—	—	—	Dancing with Strangers
1987	"Joys of Christmas"	67	—	—	—	—	—	—	—	—	—	Dancing with Strangers
1988	"Que Sera" (re-recording)	73	—	—	36	—	71	36	—	—	—	Dancing with Strangers
1988	"On the Beach" (Summer '88) (re-recording)	12	70	—	—	—	—	—	—	—	—	New Light Through Old Windows
1988	"I Can Hear Your Heartbeat" (re-recording)	74	—	—	—	—	—	—	—	—	—	New Light Through Old Windows
1988	"Fool (If You Think It's Over)" (re-recording)	—	—	—	—	—	---	—	—	—	—	New Light Through Old Windows
1988	"Driving Home for Christmas"	10 (Note: Originally charted at number 53, but reentered the charts every Christmas since 2007, attaining new peaks of 33 in 2007, 29 in 2015, 26 in 2016, 14 in 2017 and 10 in 2021.)	26	3	14	—	3	3	30	10	—	New Light Through Old Windows
1989	"Working on It"	53	85	—	—	—	—	—	—	—	73	New Light Through Old Windows
1989	"The Road to Hell"	10	78	6	35	30	35	—	—	—	—	The Road to Hell
1989	"That's What They Always Say"	83	123	—	—	35	—	—	—	—	—	The Road to Hell
1990	"Tell Me There's a Heaven"	24	—	—	—	—	—	—	—	—	—	The Road to Hell
1990	"Texas"	69	—	—	—	—	—	—	—	—	—	The Road to Hell
1991	"Auberge"	16	101	29	31	46	20	45	—	—	—	Auberge
1991	"Heaven"	57	—	—	—	—	94	—	—	—	—	Auberge
1991	"Looking for the Summer"	49	—	—	39	51	51	—	—	—	—	Auberge
1991	"Winter Song"	27	—	—	—	—	—	—	—	—	—	Auberge
1992	"Nothing to Fear"	16	164	—	—	—	—	—	—	38	—	God's Great Banana Skin
1992	"God's Great Banana Skin"	31	—	—	—	—	59	—	—	—	—	God's Great Banana Skin
1993	"Soft Top, Hard Shoulder"	53	—	—	—	—	54	—	—	—	—	God's Great Banana Skin
1993	"Too Much Pride" (re-recording)	80	—	—	—	—	—	—	—	—	—	God's Great Banana Skin
1993	"Julia"	18	173	—	—	—	40	—	—	—	—	Espresso Logic
1993	"Espresso Logic"	84	—	—	—	—	—	—	—	—	—	Espresso Logic
1994	"Johnny Needs a Fast Car"	—	—	—	—	—	—	—	—	—	—	Espresso Logic
1994	"You Can Go Your Own Way"	28	—	—	—	—	—	—	—	—	—	The Best of Chris Rea
1994	"Tell Me There's a Heaven" (re-issue)	70	—	—	—	—	—	—	—	—	—	The Best of Chris Rea
1996	"'Disco' La Passione" (with Shirley Bassey)	41	—	—	39	—	---	12	—	—	—	La Passione
1996	"Girl in a Sports Car"	77	—	—	—	—	91	—	—	—	—	La Passione
1997	"Only to Fly"	—	—	—	—	—	—	—	—	—	—	La Passione
1997	"Girl in a Sports Car" (re-issue)	89	—	—	—	—	---	—	—	—	—	La Passione
1997	"Let's Dance" (with Middlesbrough FC and Bob Mortimer)	44	—	—	—	—	—	—	—	—	—	Non-album single
1997	"The Blue Café"	—	—	—	—	—	53	—	—	—	—	The Blue Café
1998	"Square Peg, Round Hole"	80	—	—	—	—	—	—	—	—	—	The Blue Café
1998	"Sweet Summer Day"	159	—	—	—	—	71	—	—	—	—	The Blue Café
1998	"Thinking of You"	—	—	—	—	—	84	—	—	—	—	The Blue Café
1999	"New Times Square"	—	—	—	—	—	—	—	—	—	—	The Road to Hell: Part 2
2000	"All Summer Long"	78	—	—	—	—	—	—	—	—	—	King of the Beach
2000	"Tell Me There's a Heaven" (re-issue)	—	—	11	—	—	—	—	—	—	—	Non-album single
2001	"Who Do You Love?"	173	—	—	—	—	—	—	—	—	—	King of the Beach
2001	"Your Love Is Setting Me Free" (with Watermen)	—	—	—	—	—	—	—	—	—	—	Non-album single
2009	"Come So Far, Yet Still So Far to Go"	—	—	—	—	—	—	—	—	—	—	Still So Far to Go: The Best of Chris Rea
2011	"Dancing My Blues Away"	—	—	—	—	—	—	—	—	—	—	Santo Spirito Blues
"—" denotes releases that did not chart or were not released in that territory.

== Videography ==
=== Video albums ===
- Stony Road (2002)
- Dancing Down the Stony Road (2003)
- The Road to Hell & Back (The Farewell Tour) (2006)
