= The Very Best of Chris Rea =

Greatest hits album by Chris Rea
- Released: November 2001
- Genre: Album-oriented rock
- Label: East West
- Producer: Chris Rea / various

Chris Rea chronology
King of the Beach (2000)	The Very Best of Chris Rea (2001)	Dancing Down the Stony Road (2002)

Professional ratings
Review scores
Source	Rating
AllMusic	4.5/5 stars
laut.de	4/5 stars

The Very Best of Chris Rea is the third compilation album by the British singer-songwriter Chris Rea, released in 2001. The last track, "Saudade", was originally written and recorded in 1994 as a tribute to the Formula 1 racing driver Ayrton Senna who died in a crash at Imola on 1 May that year. In Portuguese, the word saudade roughly means the feeling, emotions and euphoria of a certain moment in time. This album reached number 69 on the UK Albums Chart, and was certified Gold by the BPI in 2004.

== Track listing ==
All tracks are written by Chris Rea.

No.	Title	Original Album	Length
1.	"The Road to Hell (Part 2)"	The Road to Hell	4:31
2.	"Fool (If You Think It's Over)"	Whatever Happened to Benny Santini?	4:05
3.	"Let's Dance" (Originally on Dancing with Strangers)	New Light Through Old Windows	4:16
4.	"You Can Go Your Own Way"	The Best of Chris Rea	3:56
5.	"Julia"	Espresso Logic	3:55
6.	"Stainsby Girls"	Shamrock Diaries	4:08
7.	"Tell Me There's a Heaven"	The Road to Hell	6:02
8.	"Josephine" (Single Version)	Shamrock Diaries	3:36
9.	"Steel River"	Shamrock Diaries	6:11
10.	"On the Beach"	On the Beach	3:43
11.	"I Can Hear Your Heartbeat"	Water Sign	3:23
12.	"All Summer Long"	King of the Beach	3:33
13.	"The Blue Cafe"	The Blue Cafe	4:47
14.	"Auberge"	Auberge	4:44
15.	"Driving Home for Christmas"	Standalone Single	4:01
16.	"Nothing to Fear"	God's Great Banana Skin	4:30
17.	"Saudade, Pt. 1 and 2"	La Passione	6:47

== Charts ==
Chart performance for The Very Best of Chris Rea
Chart (2001)	Peak position
Belgian Albums (Ultratop Flanders)	27
Finnish Albums (Suomen virallinen lista)	5
German Albums (Offizielle Top 100)	60
Norwegian Albums (VG-lista)	16
UK Albums (OCC)	69

Chart performance for The Very Best of Chris Rea
Chart (2025)	Peak position
Swiss Albums (Schweizer Hitparade)	40

== Certifications ==
Certifications for The Very Best of Chris Rea
Region	Certification	Certified units/sales
United Kingdom (BPI)	Gold	100,000^{^}
Summaries
Europe (IFPI)	3× Platinum	3,000,000^{*}
^{*} Sales figures based on certification alone.^{^} Shipments figures based on certification alone.
