= The Journey 1978–2009 =

Greatest hits album by Chris Rea
- Released: 3 October 2011
- Recorded: 1978–2009
- Genre: Rock, blues
- Length: 156:35
- Label: Music Club Deluxe

Chris Rea chronology
Santo Spirito Blues (2011)	The Journey 1978–2009 (2011)	Road Songs for Lovers (2017)

Professional ratings
Review scores
Source	Rating
AllMusic	3.5/5 stars

The Journey 1978–2009 is a compilation album by British singer-songwriter Chris Rea, released in October 2011 by Music Club Deluxe. It features songs spanning his entire career, from 1978's Whatever Happened to Benny Santini? to 2009's Still So Far to Go: The Best of Chris Rea. It had a modest chart performance, peaking at number 66 on the UK Albums Chart, but was certified Gold by BPI in 2013.

== Track listing ==
All tracks written by Chris Rea.

=== Disc one ===
1. "Let's Dance" – 4:06
2. "On the Beach" – 6:51
3. "Driving Home for Christmas" – 4:01
4. "I Can Hear Your Heartbeat" – 3:26
5. "Julia" – 3:54
6. "Stainsby Girls" – 3:52
7. "Come So Far, Yet Still So Far to Go" – 4:13
8. "God's Great Banana Skin" – 5:18
9. "Josephine (French Edit)" – 3:56
10. "Texas" – 4:00
11. "Working on It" – 4:24
12. "Heaven" – 4:12
13. "Candles" – 4:44
14. "Shamrock Diaries" – 4:13
15. "Blue Street" – 7:08
16. "Ace of Hearts" – 4:53
17. "You Can Go Your Own Way" – 3:54

("Texas" is the 1983 song from Water Sign album, not the better known 1989 song from The Road to Hell.)

=== Disc two ===
1. "The Road to Hell (Part 2)" – 4:35
2. "Auberge" – 4:45
3. "Fool (If You Think It's Over)" – 4:04
4. "Soft Top, Hard Shoulder" – 4:23
5. "Looking for the Summer" – 5:02
6. "Tell Me There's a Heaven" – 6:01
7. "Diamonds" – 4:52
8. "Loving You" – 3:48
9. "I Don't Know What It Is But I Love It" – 3:35
10. "On the Beach (Summer '88)" – 3:42
11. "Windy Town" – 4:26
12. "Giverny" – 5:40
13. "The Blue Café" – 4:46
14. "Winter Song" – 4:31
15. "Easy Rider" – 4:49
16. "Two Roads" – 3:43
17. "Saudade Parts 1 & 2 (Tribute to Ayrton Senna)" – 6:48

== Charts ==
=== Weekly charts ===
Chart performance for The Journey 1978–2009
Chart (2012)	Peak position
UK Albums (OCC)	66

=== Year-end charts ===
Year-end chart performance for The Journey 1978–2009
Chart (2012)	Position
UK Albums (OCC)	171

== Certifications ==
Region	Certification	Certified units/sales
United Kingdom (BPI)	Gold	100,000^{^}
^{^} Shipments figures based on certification alone.
