= Chris Rea: The Ultimate Collection 1978–2000 =

Chris Rea - The Ultimate Collection 1978-2000

Compilation album by Chris Rea
- Released: 2007
- Genre: Rock
- Label: Demon Music Group

Chris Rea chronology
Heartbeats (2005)	Chris Rea - The Ultimate Collection 1978-2000 (2007)	The Return of the Fabulous Hofner Bluenotes (2008)

Chris Rea - The Ultimate Collection (1978-2000) is a 2007 3-CD compilation of the most recognisable tracks from British singer-songwriter Chris Rea's solo career.

== Track listing ==
Disc 1

1. "Auberge"
2. "Fool (If You Think It's Over)"
3. "Let's Dance"
4. "Josephine"
5. "The Blue Cafe"
6. "Julia"
7. "Ace of Hearts"
8. "Winter Song"
9. "Bless Them All"
10. "Heaven"
11. "Lucky Day"
12. "The Mention of Your Name"
13. "Love's Strange Ways"
14. "Loving You"
15. "Nothing's Happening By The Sea"
16. "Diamonds"
17. "Every Beat of My Heart"
18. "I Can't Dance To That"

Disc 2

1. "The Road To Hell (Part II)"
2. "Gone Fishing"
3. "On the Beach"
4. "Black Dog"
5. "You Must Be Evil"
6. "New Times Square"
7. "One Golden Rule"
8. "Dov'e Il Signore? (Part II)"
9. "I Ain't The Fool"
10. "Stone"
11. "Working On It"
12. "Two Roads"
13. "Keep On Dancing"
14. "I Don't Care Anymore"
15. "Windy Town"
16. "Horses"
17. "God Gave Me An Angel"
18. "Sweet Kiss"

Disc 3

1. "Stainsby Girls"
2. "New Way"
3. "The Memory Of A Good Friend"
4. "Love Turns To Lies"
5. "Square Peg, Round Hole"
6. "I Can Hear Your Heartbeat"
7. "No Qualifications"
8. "Since I Found You"
9. "Runaway"
10. "Chisel Hill"
11. "Soft Top, Hard Shoulder"
12. "The Things Lovers Should Do"
13. "I Just Wanna Be With You"
14. "Touche D'Amour"
15. "I Don't Know What It Is But I Love It"
16. "That's What They Always Say"
17. "Little Blond Plaits"
18. "Driving Home For Christmas"

== Personnel ==
- Chris Rea – vocals, guitar, produce
- Robert Ahwai – guitar
- Eoghan O'Neill – bass
- Max Middleton – keyboards
- Martin Ditcham – drums
