= Still So Far to Go: The Best of Chris Rea =

Greatest hits album by Chris Rea
- Released: 29 September 2009
- Recorded: 1978–2009
- Genre: Album-oriented rock, blues
- Length: 153:18
- Label: Rhino

Chris Rea chronology
The Return of the Fabulous Hofner Bluenotes (2008)	Still So Far to Go: The Best of Chris Rea (2009)	Santo Spirito Blues (2011)

Professional ratings
Review scores
Source	Rating
AllMusic	3.5/5 stars
Polityka	5/6 stars

Still So Far to Go: The Best of Chris Rea is a compilation album by British singer-songwriter Chris Rea, released by Rhino Records in September 2009. The album reached number 8 on the UK Albums Chart, making it Rea's first entry in the top 10 in ten years since The Blue Cafe (1998), and was certified Gold by BPI in 2013.

== Track listing ==
All tracks written by Chris Rea.

=== Disc one ===
1. "Fool (If You Think It's Over)" – 4:07
2. "On the Beach" – 3:46
3. "Let's Dance" – 4:17
4. "Diamonds" – 4:11
5. "Loving You" – 3:48
6. "I Can Hear Your Heartbeat" – 3:26
7. "I Don't Know What It Is But I Love It" – 3:37
8. "Stainsby Girls" – 4:08
9. "Josephine" – 4:36
10. "It's All Gone" – 4:11
11. "Loving You Again" – 4:27
12. "Joys of Christmas" – 5:05
13. "Driving Home for Christmas" – 4:02
14. "Working on It" – 4:27
15. "Tell Me There's a Heaven" – 6:03
16. "Heaven" – 4:12
17. "Looking for the Summer" – 5:06
18. "Come So Far, Yet Still So Far to Go" – 4:14

=== Disc two ===
1. "The Road to Hell (Part 2)" – 4:33
2. "Auberge" – 4:43
3. "Winter Song" – 4:37
4. "Nothing to Fear" – 4:30
5. "God's Great Banana Skin" – 5:21
6. "Julia" – 3:57
7. "You Can Go Your Own Way" – 3:59
8. "When the Grey Skies Turn to Blue" – 3:44
9. "The Blue Cafe" – 4:02
10. "New Times Square" – 4:01
11. "Stony Road" – 5:32
12. "Easy Rider" – 4:50
13. "Blue Street" – 7:09
14. "Somewhere Between Highway 61 & 49" – 6:09
15. "The Shadow of a Fool" – 3:58
16. "Valentino" – 4:30

These are the actual versions that appear in this set:

- Track 1-1 is the 1988 re-recording from New Light Through Old Windows (The Best Of Chris Rea)
- Track 1-2 is the 7" single version of On The Beach (Summer ’88)
- Track 1-3 is the 1988 re-recording from New Light Through Old Windows (The Best Of Chris Rea)
- Track 1-4 is an edit of Diamonds, slightly longer than the 7" single version
- Track 1-6 is the 1988 re-recording from New Light Through Old Windows (The Best Of Chris Rea)
- Track 1-7 is the 7" single version
- Track 1-8 is the 1988 re-recording from New Light Through Old Windows (The Best Of Chris Rea)
- Track 1-9 is the 1988 re-recording from New Light Through Old Windows (The Best Of Chris Rea)
- Track 1-10 is single edit
- Track 1-11 is the 7" single version
- Track 1-13 is the 1988 re-recording from New Light Through Old Windows (The Best Of Chris Rea)
- Track 2-1 is The Road To Hell (Part 2)
- Track 2-2 is the single version
- Track 2-4 is the promo single edit
- Track 2-9 is the Radio Edit
- Track 2-10 is the Manhattan Remix

== Charts ==
Chart performance for Still So Far to Go: The Best of Chris Rea
Chart (2009)	Peak position
Belgian Albums (Ultratop Wallonia)	78
Croatian Albums (HDU)	11
German Albums (Offizielle Top 100)	37
Greek Albums (IFPI)	16
Irish Albums (IRMA)	67
Swedish Albums (Sverigetopplistan)	10
UK Albums (OCC)	8

== Certifications ==
Certifications for Still So Far to Go: The Best of Chris Rea
Region	Certification	Certified units/sales
United Kingdom (BPI)	Gold	100,000^{^}
^{^} Shipments figures based on certification alone.
