= Heartbeats – Chris Rea's Greatest Hits =

Greatest hits album by Chris Rea
- Released: August 2005
- Genre: Album-oriented rock
- Label: Magnet
- Producer: Chris Rea / various

Chris Rea chronology
Blue Guitars (2005)	Heartbeats – Chris Rea's Greatest Hits (2005)	Chris Rea: The Ultimate Collection 1978–2000 (2007)

Heartbeats – Chris Rea's Greatest Hits is a 2005 compilation album by British singer-songwriter Chris Rea. It reached No. 24 position in UK Albums Chart, and was certified Silver by BPI in 2006.

== Track listing ==
1. "On the Beach" (Edit) – 3:43
2. "Fool (If You Think It's Over)" – 4:03
3. "Auberge" – 4:41
4. "Let's Dance" – 4:14
5. "Stainsby Girls" – 4:05
6. "Nothing to Fear" (Edit) – 4:27
7. "Tell Me There's a Heaven" – 6:01
8. "Josephine" (Edit) – 4:29
9. "I Can Hear Your Heartbeat" – 3:21
10. "The Road to Hell (Part 2)" – 4:26
11. "Winter Song" – 4:29
12. "God's Great Banana Skin" – 4:14
13. "You Can Go Your Own Way" – 3:54
14. "Julia" – 3:54
15. "Looking for the Summer" – 4:57
16. "Gone Fishing" – 4:41

== Certifications ==
Certifications for "Heartbeats – Chris Rea's Greatest Hits"
Region	Certification	Certified units/sales
New Zealand (RMNZ)	Gold	7,500^{^}
United Kingdom (BPI)	Silver	60,000^{^}
^{^} Shipments figures based on certification alone.
