= The Best of Chris Rea =

Greatest hits album by Chris Rea
- Released: 24 October 1994
- Recorded: 1978–1993
- Genre: Album-oriented rock
- Length: 77:15
- Label: East West
- Producer: Chris Rea; Jon Kelly

Chris Rea chronology
Espresso Logic (1993)	The Best of Chris Rea (1994)	La Passione (1996)

Professional ratings
Review scores
Source	Rating
AllMusic	link
Music Week	4/5 stars

The Best of Chris Rea is the second compilation album by British singer-songwriter Chris Rea, released in 1994. The album contains 15 previously released songs plus two new tracks, "You Can Go Your Own Way" and "Three Little Green Candles" (the former of which was released as a single to promote the album, with the latter as a B-side). The collection notably omits Rea's 1988 Christmas hit "Driving Home for Christmas". The song "If You Were Me" is a duet between Rea and Elton John, originally released on John's Duets album in 1993.

== Track listing ==
All tracks written by Chris Rea

No.	Title	From album	Length
1.	"The Road to Hell (Part 2)"	The Road to Hell	4:32
2.	"Josephine"	Shamrock Diaries	4:34
3.	"Let's Dance"	Dancing with Strangers	4:17
4.	"Fool (If You Think It's Over)"	Whatever Happened to Benny Santini?	4:07
5.	"Auberge"	Auberge	4:45
6.	"Julia"	Espresso Logic	3:56
7.	"Stainsby Girls"	New Light Through Old Windows	4:08
8.	"If You Were Me" (duet with Elton John)	Duets (Elton John)	4:23
9.	"On the Beach (Summer '88)"	New Light Through Old Windows	6:51
10.	"Looking for the Summer"	Auberge	5:02
11.	"I Can Hear Your Heartbeat"	Water Sign	3:26
12.	"You Can Go Your Own Way"	Previously unreleased	3:57
13.	"God's Great Banana Skin"	God's Great Banana Skin	4:19
14.	"Winter Song"	Auberge	4:32
15.	"Gone Fishing"	Auberge	4:42
16.	"Tell Me There's a Heaven"	The Road to Hell	6:02
17.	"Three Little Green Candles"	B-side to "You Can Go Your Own Way"	3:42

"You Can Go Your Own Way" and a re-released "Tell Me There's a Heaven" were released as singles in late 1994 to promote this album.

"Three Little Green Candles" is a bonus track which was released slightly earlier on the "You Can Go Your Own Way" single.

== Personnel ==
- Chris Rea – producer (1–4, 6, 8, 9, 11–13, 16, 17)
- Jon Kelly – producer (1–5, 7, 9–11, 14–16)
- Neil Amor – engineer (1, 13, 16)
- Diane BJ Koné – engineer (1, 16)
- Justin Shirley-Smith – engineer (2–5, 7–11, 14, 15)
- Stuart Epps – engineer (6, 8, 12, 17)
- Robin Aristorenas – engineer (17)
- Mike Ross – art direction, design
- Kevin Stapleton – photography
- Stephen Sandon – photography (of Chris Rea)
- Jim Beach – management
- Paul Lilly – management

== Charts ==
=== Weekly charts ===
Weekly chart performance for The Best of Chris Rea
Chart (1994–1995)	Peak position
Australian Albums (ARIA)	73
Belgian Albums (Ultratop Flanders)	47
Belgian Albums (Ultratop Wallonia)	38
Dutch Albums (Album Top 100)	35
European Albums (European Top 100 Albums)	7
German Albums (Offizielle Top 100)	4
Hungarian Albums (MAHASZ)	11
Norwegian Albums (VG-lista)	7
Swedish Albums (Sverigetopplistan)	7
Swiss Albums (Schweizer Hitparade)	6
UK Albums (OCC)	3

=== Year-end charts ===
1994 year-end chart performance for The Best of Chris Rea
Chart (1994)	Peak position
European Albums (European Top 100 Albums)	100
German Albums (Offizielle Top 100)	96
UK Albums (OCC)	33

1995 year-end chart performance for The Best of Chris Rea
Chart (1995)	Peak position
European Albums (European Top 100 Albums)	83
German Albums (Offizielle Top 100)	79

== Certifications ==
Certifications for The Best of Chris Rea
Region	Certification	Certified units/sales
Austria (IFPI Austria)	Platinum	50,000^{*}
Finland (Musiikkituottajat)	Gold	32,000
France (SNEP)	2× Gold	200,000^{*}
Germany (BVMI)	Platinum	500,000^{^}
Poland (ZPAV)	Gold	50,000^{*}
Sweden (GLF)	Gold	50,000^{^}
Switzerland (IFPI Switzerland)	Platinum	50,000^{^}
United Kingdom (BPI)	Platinum	300,000^{^}
Summaries
Europe (IFPI)	Platinum	1,000,000^{*}
^{*} Sales figures based on certification alone.^{^} Shipments figures based on certification alone.
