= Go Your Own Way (disambiguation) =

"Go Your Own Way" is a 1976 song by Fleetwood Mac.

Go Your Own Way may also refer to:

== Other music ==
- Go Your Own Way (album), an album by Gareth Gates (2003)
- "Go Your Own Way", single by Yumi Shizukusa (2007)
- "Go Your Own Way", song on Determination (God Forbid album) (2001)
- "Go Your Own Way", song on Ordinary Alien album by Boy George (2010)
- "Go Your Own Way", single by Canadian singers Drake Jensen and Patrick Masse (2017)

== Other uses ==
- Go Your Own Way (Dexter), a 2008 episode of the TV series Dexter
- Go Your Own Way, a slogan to promote Tourism in Albania
- "Go your own way", slogan of Independence Air
- "Go Your Own Way", episode of animated TV series Rolling with the Ronks! (2016)

== See also ==
- "You Can Go Your Own Way", song by Chris Rea
