= 'Disco' La Passione =

Single by Chris Rea / Shirley Bassey

from the album La Passione
- Released: 4 November 1996
- Recorded: 1996
- Genre: Dance-pop
- Length: 4.54
- Label: East West
- Songwriter: Chris Rea
- Producer: Chris Rea

"'Disco' La Passione" is a 1996 song by British singer-songwriter Chris Rea. The song was written for the film La Passione, a semi-autobiography by Rea. Shirley Bassey made her feature film debut here, but the film was a disappointment at the box office. A single was issued, produced by Rea and, unusual for Bassey, credited as co-performer. The track also appears on the soundtrack album La Passione. The single sold well in Europe, making the Top 40 of the Dutch and Belgian charts, but just missed being a Top 40 hit on the UK Singles Chart, charting at number 41.

A video was issued to promote the single, it is taken from the performance made in the film. Shirley Bassey performed the song frequently live in 1996 and 1997, a live recording of the song appears on the 1997 CD The Birthday Concert.

== Track listing ==
European 2 track CD single

1. "'Disco' La Passione" (Film Version) -4.54
2. "'Disco' La Passione" (Adams and Gielen 12 Inch Mix) -5.22

UK 3 track maxi CD single and 12" vinyl single

1. "'Disco' La Passione" (Film Version) -4.54
2. "'Disco' La Passione" (Adams and Gielen 12 Inch Mix) -5.22
3. "'Disco' La Passione" (Adams and Gielen 7 Inch Mix) -3.21
4. "Horses" (Instrumental) -3.05

== Personnel ==
- Shirley Bassey - Vocal
- Gavin Wright Film Orchestra
- Max Middleton - Conductor
- Chris Rea - Bass, Drums, Guitars and Keyboards
