= Italia Guitars =

Guitar manufacturer

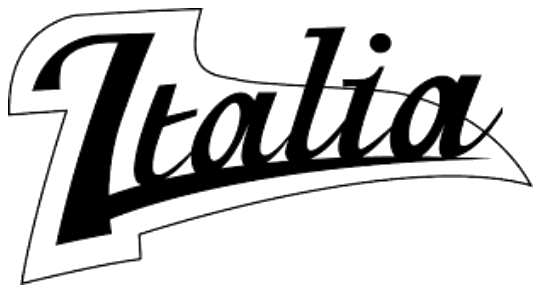
- Company type: Private
- Industry: Musical instruments
- Founded: 1998; 28 years ago
- Founder: MirrMusic Co., Ltd.
- Headquarters: South Korea
- Products: Electric guitars, basses
- Owner: MirrMusic Co., Ltd.
- Website: italiaguitarusa.com

Italia Guitars is a musical instruments manufacturer company that produces retro-styled electric guitars and basses. The company was founded in 1998 with a line of guitars designed in England by luthier Trevor Wilkinson and manufactured in South Korea.

== Description ==
Most guitars are based on other guitars manufactured in the 1950s and 1960s. For example, the basic shape of the Maranello is based on a Swedish Hagström of the late 1950s. The Modena is based on an Italian Crucianelli from the early 1960s. The guitars have been used by many musicians, most notably Chris Rea who discovered them after recovering from pancreatitis and deciding to embrace blues. A chance trip to a local music store led him to discover Italia guitars. He found they so perfectly suited for him that he bought four for recording and touring, saying "I've played the best guitar of my life on that guitar."

== Models ==
=== Guitars ===
- Europa
- Fiorano Standard, Corian
- Imola
- Jeffrey Foskett Signature JF6, JF12, JFQ
- Maranello Classic, Speedster, '61, '63, Semitone
- Mondial Classic, Deluxe, Sportser
- Modena Classic, Challenge, Revolution, Semitone, Sitar
- Modulo Tipo1, Tipo3
- Monza
- Rimini 6, 12, Twin double neck
- Torino

=== Basses ===
- Imola 4, 5, GP, GP5
- Maranello Classic, Cavo
- Modulo Tipo1, Tipo3
- Mondial Classic, Deluxe, Sportster
- Rimini
- Torino

== Artists ==
Some artists that perform/have performed with Italia guitars are:

- Lightspeed Champion
- Eon Sinclair of Bedouin Soundclash
- Chris Rea
- Elliot Easton of The Cars
- Ricky Phillips of The Babys, Bad English and Styx
- Conrad Keely of ...And You Will Know Us by the Trail of Dead
- Todd Rundgren
- Jeff Cook of Alabama
- Nicky Wire of Manic Street Preachers
- Kenny Olson of Kid Rock and Twisted Brown Trucker
- Whitey Kirst of Iggy Pop
- Eddie Duffy of Simple Minds
- Fernando Perdomo of Transendence and DC-3
- Jason Ringenberg of Jason & the Scorchers
- Boz Boorer of Adam Ant and Morrissey
- Gary Day of Morrissey
- Bo Ramsey of Lucinda Williams and Ani DiFranco
- Nicholas Andrew Sadler of Daughters
- Simon Edwards or Billy Bragg
- Anthony Drennan of The Corrs
- Keith Duffy of The Corrs and Ronan Keating Band
- Ronny North of North
- Joey Mazzola of Sponge
- Paul Duffy of Ronan Keating Band and Boyzone
- Ben Waugh of The Sillies
- Goran Bregović
- Jarrad Nöir of Foreign Legion

== In popular culture ==
An Italia Mondial Classic guitar is featured prominently in the 2005 Japanese movie Linda Linda Linda performed by Yuu Kashii as Kei Tachibana. An Italia Mondial II "Woody" guitar was also played by Haruhi Suzumiya in the 2006 anime series The Melancholy of Haruhi Suzumiya.
