= Paul Casey (musician) =

Irish songwriter, guitarist and singer

- Born: Ireland
- Origin: Ireland
- Occupations: singer, guitarist, songwriter
- Website: www.paulcaseymusic.com

Paul Casey is an Irish songwriter, guitarist and singer.

Paul's song "Blow Away the Clouds" was used on MTV's The Real World Brooklyn (Eps 7: Of Mice and Devyn's Men).

He has released a new album called Scrapbook and was a special guest on a 2010 Chris Rea's Still So Far to Go European musical tour.
