= Road Songs for Lovers =

Studio album by Chris Rea
- Released: 29 September 2017
- Recorded: February – June 2017
- Studio: Metropolis Studios
- Genre: Blues; rock
- Length: 58:20
- Label: Jazzee Blue & BMG
- Producer: Chris Rea

Chris Rea chronology
The Journey 1978-2009 (2011)	Road Songs for Lovers (2017)	One Fine Day (2019)

Music video
- "Last Train (Lyric Video)" on YouTube

Professional ratings
Review scores
Source	Rating
All About Jazz	4.5/5 stars
laut.de	3/5 stars
Louder Sound	3.5/5 stars
Polityka	4/6 stars
Record Collector	3/5 stars
The Spill Magazine	4/5 stars

Road Songs for Lovers is the twenty-fourth studio album by British singer-songwriter Chris Rea, and the final to be composed of original material, released on 29 September 2017 by Jazzee Blue and BMG labels.

== Background ==
Rea stated there was no initial intention to make a new album, but after a bad medical condition in 2016 he started to write new songs which eventually led to a band regroup, and first album release in six years. A semi-concept album, the songs were inspired by traveling on the road to London, seeing couples in cars and questioning the "people's love stories inside cars". According to Rea, most of the songs are about a boy-girl relationship in the car. He has stated that his favorite song is "Last Train", the lyrics of which are not about the typical meaning of the last train which goes home, but taking the last train in a desperate situation without knowing anything about its direction.

== Release ==
The album was released on a double gatefold vinyl LP, and CD edition featuring 12-page booklet. Prior to the album release the song "The Road Ahead" was released on 29 July 2017 as a single for digital download and streaming.

== Tour ==
The album release was followed by a European tour with 37 dates which started in October until December, 2017. During the tour he had to have daily three hours long therapy for nerves in his right hand. On 9 December, Rea collapsed during a performance at the New Theatre Oxford, the 35th concert of the tour. He was taken to hospital, with his condition stabilised, and the last two concerts canceled.

== Reception ==
Doug Collette, in a review for All About Jazz, gave the album 4/5 stars, concluding that "the sonics of this album, as applied to the tantalizing guitar solo of 'Last Train' and throughout the album, are a reassuring blend of succor and salve for body, mind and soul". Aaron Badgley for The Spill Magazine also gave it 4/5 rating, praising the album for its blend of blues and rock, stating that "young artists would do well to study this one, it really could be a blueprint for how a good rock album should sound".

Andrew W. Griffin rated it 4.5/5, considered "Last Train" to be "delivered in gothic, world-weary style that brings to mind Bob Dylan or Tom Waits or Nick Cave" and praised the engineers, Alex Robinson and Tim Young, mastering. Hugh Fielder writing for Louder Sound commented, "As the title suggests, Rea is on familiar ground once again, but his fans won’t be complaining. After all, the scenery on any road trip is an endless vista of observations and speculations, and Rea’s lyrics can evoke both with consummate ease, drawing you closer as the album progresses. The musical class on this record is, of course, a given." Giuliano Benassi for laut.de gave a score of 3/5 and concluded it gives "easy listening for intense concert evenings" and that Rea "still does not lack musical ideas".

== Track listing ==
All tracks are written by Chris Rea.

No.	Title	Length
1.	"Happy on the Road"	3:46
2.	"Nothing Left Behind"	5:29
3.	"Road Songs for Lovers"	4:13
4.	"Money"	5:57
5.	"Two Lost Souls"	4:46
6.	"Rock My Soul"	4:07
7.	"Moving On"	5:10
8.	"The Road Ahead"	4:16
9.	"Last Train"	6:33
10.	"Angel of Love"	4:29
11.	"Breaking Point"	5:54
12.	"Beautiful"	3:40
Total length:		58:20

== Personnel ==
- Chris Rea – vocals, guitars
- Neil Drinkwater – keyboards
- Robert Ahwai – rhythm guitars
- James Ahwai – bass
- Martin Ditcham – drums

=== Production ===
- Chris Rea – producer, front cover collage
- Alex Robinson – engineer, mixing
- Tim Young – mastering
- Melanie Fordyce – art direction, design
- Stuart Crouch Creative – art direction, design
- Adam Cowe – session photography

== Charts ==
Chart performance for Road Songs for Lovers
Chart (2017)	Peak position
Austrian Albums (Ö3 Austria)	22
Belgian Albums (Ultratop Flanders)	34
Belgian Albums (Ultratop Wallonia)	30
Dutch Albums (Album Top 100)	52
French Albums (SNEP)	188
German Albums (Offizielle Top 100)	19
Swiss Albums (Schweizer Hitparade)	18
UK Albums (OCC)	11
UK Independent Albums (OCC)	3
