= Deltics (album) =

Studio album by Chris Rea
- Released: April 1979
- Recorded: July – December 1978
- Studios: Moonlight Studios (London, UK)
- Genre: Album-oriented rock
- Length: 45:55
- Labels: United Artists, Magnet
- Producer: Gus Dudgeon

Chris Rea chronology
Whatever Happened to Benny Santini? (1978)	Deltics (1979)	Tennis (1980)

Music video
- "Diamonds (TopPop 1979)" on YouTube

Professional ratings
Review scores
Source	Rating
AllMusic	3.5/5 stars

Deltics is the second studio album by British singer-songwriter Chris Rea. It was released in 1979 on Magnet Records. The album is named after the East Coast rail network's Deltic-class locomotives that were used in the 1960s and 1970s. The album is Rea's first album to chart on the UK Albums Chart, peaking at number fifty-four. The single "Diamonds" peaked at number 44 on both the UK Singles Chart, and Billboard Hot 100, where it charted for eight weeks. The B-side of this single, "Cleveland Calling", was not included on the CD reissue of the album. The album producer Gus Dudgeon had made several early albums with Elton John.

== Track listing ==
All songs by Chris Rea.

1. "Twisted Wheel" – 5:15
2. "The Things Lovers Should Do" – 3:35
3. "Dance! (Don't Think)" – 3:52
4. "Raincoat and a Rose" – 4:09
5. "Cenotaph/Letter from Amsterdam" – 5:49
6. "Deltics" – 5:28
7. "Diamonds" – 4:51
8. "She Gave It Away" – 4:00
9. "Don't Want Your Best Friend" – 3:44
10. "No Qualifications" – 2:20
11. "Seabird" – 2:52

== Singles ==
1. "Diamonds" b/w "Cleveland Calling"
2. "Raincoat and a Rose" b/w "No Qualifications"

== Personnel ==
=== Musicians ===
- Chris Rea – vocals, pianos, synthesizers, accordion, acoustic guitar, 12-string acoustic guitar, electric guitars, slide guitar
- Graham Watson – organ
- Eddie Guy – acoustic guitar (2)
- Martin Jenner – acoustic guitar (8)
- Kevin Peek – acoustic guitar (11)
- Mick Hutchinson – bass
- Norman Nosebait – drums
- Gus Dudgeon – percussion (1–3, 6)
- Morris Pert – percussion (4, 7, 8)
- Bruce Baxter – brass arrangements (1, 7), string arrangements (1, 3, 4, 7, 11)
- Steve Gregory – brass arrangements (6, 9, 10), saxophone solo (10)
- Vicki Brown – backing vocals (3)
- Liza Strike – backing vocals (3)
- Joy Yates – backing vocals (3)
- Stuart Epps – backing vocals (6)

=== Production ===
- Gus Dudgeon – producer
- Stuart Epps – engineer
- Gordon Vicary – mastering at Utopia Studios (London, UK)
- Media Visual Arts Ltd. – sleeve design
- Jacques Lowe – photography
- Jim Beach – management
- John McCoy – management

== Charts ==
Chart performance for Deltics
Chart (1979)	Peak position
Australian Albums (Kent Music Report)	27
Canada Top Albums/CDs (RPM)	95
UK Albums (Official Charts)	54
