= Santo Spirito Blues =

Studio album by Chris Rea
- Released: 5 September 2011
- Studio: Metropolis Studios
- Genre: Blues, rock
- Length: 60:14
- Label: Jazzee Blue/Rhino
- Producer: Chris Rea

Chris Rea chronology
Still So Far to Go: The Best of Chris Rea (2009)	Santo Spirito Blues (2011)	The Journey 1978–2009 (2011)

Professional ratings
Review scores
Source	Rating
AllMusic	3/5 stars
Jazz Forum	3/5 stars
laut.de	3/5 stars
Record Collector	2/5 stars

Santo Spirito Blues is the twenty-third studio album by British singer-songwriter Chris Rea, released in September 2011 by his independent record label Jazzee Blue and Rhino Entertainment.

== Background ==
The album, titled "Santo Spirito Blues" marked a distinctive project. In addition to the standard CD edition, a deluxe version was released, featuring two DVDs containing documentaries titled "Bull Fighting" and "Santo Spirito," along with two CDs containing the soundtracks of these documentaries.

Chris Rea drew inspiration for the album from the Santo Spirito church in Florence during a visit to his daughter. Regarding the first documentary, his interest was piqued by the theme of bullfighting and matadors, including figures like Julián López Escobar. However, during a trip to Seville, when he attended a bullfight, he was horrified by the harsh reality. He left the event, stating that "there are two sides to that story because even after the bull is half dead, the bullfighter still has to be really brave."

The documentary "Bull Fighting" (59 minutes) offers a raw and brutally honest chronicle of bullfighting. It features neo-classical and Spanish-themed gypsy music. The second documentary, "Santo Spirito" (55 minutes), adopts the appearance of a Russian 1930s black and white film. It follows a man on a quest for truth in religion in the city of Florence—a journey he may or may not wish he had undertaken. Both documentaries were written and directed by Rea, with assistance from filmmaker Scott McBurney.[citation needed] Rea recalls that he created these films "just so that I could compose the music." The second documentary was broadcast in September 2011 on Tagesschau German television service.

== Reception ==
Jon O'Brien in review for AllMusic rated the album 3/5 stars and concluded that the "overall ambitious concept proves that the just-turned-sixty-year-old certainly no longer holds any commercial aspirations". Artur Schulz for laut.de gave it the same score, and noted it has a mixture of both authentic blues and his pop-rock catchy work (particularly "The Chance of Love") from the "Dancing with Strangers" era, "with mostly good results: Chris manages the balancing act between fun and seriousness mostly effortlessly". Luke Turner in BBC review noted that it is a "straightforward homage to blues traditionalism [...] playing is exemplary, his songwriting accomplished, the boxes ticked", but being too focused on guitar playing, besides "The Chance of Love" his "gravelly voice [...] struggles to be heard".

== Track listing ==
All tracks are written by Chris Rea.

Santo Spirito Blues track listing
No.	Title	Length
1.	"Dancing My Blues Away"	4:13
2.	"Rock and Roll Tonight"	3:42
3.	"Never Tie Me Down"	4:35
4.	"The Chance of Love"	4:15
5.	"The Last Open Road"	4:20
6.	"Electric Guitar"	4:21
7.	"Money"	6:47
8.	"The Way She Moves"	5:55
9.	"Dance with Me All Night Long"	6:03
10.	"Think Like a Woman"	4:19
11.	"You Got Lucky"	3:55
12.	"Lose My Heart in You"	4:55
13.	"I Will Go On"	3:00
Total length:		60:14

All tracks are written by Chris Rea.

Bull Fighting: The Soundtrack
No.	Title	Length
1.	"Girl"	7:26
2.	"Girl and Matador"	8:15
3.	"Here He Comes"	8:26
4.	"Gates"	3:07
5.	"The Work"	6:45
6.	"The Bull"	2:58
7.	"The Fight"	10:10
8.	"Main Tune"	4:29
9.	"Old Matador"	3:27
10.	"Finale"	3:01

All tracks are written by Chris Rea.

Santo Spirito: The Soundtrack
No.	Title	Length
1.	"Santo Spirito"	4:02
2.	"The Truth"	4:27
3.	"Florence Streets"	3:13
4.	"Dante's Inferno"	4:51
5.	"Does Love Count for Nothing"	3:12
6.	"Forever"	1:28
7.	"Somewhere Between the Stars"	6:39

== Personnel ==
- Chris Rea – performer, producer, cover painting
- Paul Casey – recording
- Jon Kelly – mastering
- Tim Young – mastering
- Metropolis Mastering (London, UK) – mastering location
- Peacock – design
- Scott McBurney – photography
- John Knowles – management

== Charts ==
Chart performance for Santo Spirito Blues
Chart (2011)	Peak position
Austrian Albums (Ö3 Austria)	30
Belgian Albums (Ultratop Flanders)	43
Belgian Albums (Ultratop Wallonia)	38
Croatian Albums (TOTS)	13
Danish Albums (Hitlisten)	39
Dutch Albums (Album Top 100)	44
Finnish Albums (Suomen virallinen lista)	35
German Albums (Offizielle Top 100)	10
Hungarian Albums (Mahasz)	33
Norwegian Albums (VG-lista)	27
Polish Albums (OLiS)	33
Swiss Albums (Schweizer Hitparade)	31
UK Albums (OCC)	13

== Certifications ==
Certifications for Santo Spirito Blues
Region	Certification	Certified units/sales
Poland (ZPAV)	Gold	10,000^{*}
^{*} Sales figures based on certification alone.
