= King of the Beach (Chris Rea album) =

Studio album by Chris Rea
- Released: 2 October 2000
- Recorded: March – July 2000
- Studio: Sol Studios (Cookham, Berkshire, UK)
- Genre: Album-oriented rock
- Length: 59:51
- Label: East West
- Producer: Chris Rea

Chris Rea chronology
The Road to Hell: Part 2 (1999)	King of the Beach (2000)	The Very Best of Chris Rea (2001)

Professional ratings
Review scores
Source	Rating
AllMusic	4/5 stars
laut.de	3/5 stars
Rolling Stone	2/5 stars

King of the Beach is the sixteenth studio album by British singer-songwriter Chris Rea, released in October 2000. The singles released for the album were "All Summer Long" and "Who Do You Love". The album reached number 26 in the UK. There was also a Japanese version with "Mississippi" and "There’s Only You" included as tracks.

The album, being a loose sequel to earlier On the Beach, was inspired by Rea's trip to Turks and Caicos Islands. A remix of "All Summer Long" was a dance hit in Ibiza and other Mediterranean places.

== Track listing ==
All songs by Chris Rea.

1. "King of the Beach" – 5:00
2. "All Summer Long" – 5:14
3. "Sail Away" – 4:48
4. "Still Beautiful" – 4:10
5. "The Bones of Angels" – 4:15
6. "Guitar Street" – 4:42
7. "Who Do You Love" – 4:52
8. "The Memory of a Good Friend" – 3:55
9. "Sandwriting" – 5:08
10. "Tamatave" – 5:17
11. "God Gave Me an Angel" – 2:59
12. "Waiting for a Blue Sky" – 5:02

European bonus track

13. "Mississippi" – 4:29

Japanese bonus tracks

13. "Mississippi" – 4:29
14. "There's Only You" – 3:40

== Personnel ==
=== Musicians ===
- Chris Rea – vocals, keyboards (1–3, 5–8, 10, 12–14), Hammond organ (1, 4, 8, 9), guitars (1–10, 12–14), bass (1–10, 12–14), drum programming (2, 4, 6–12), acoustic piano (5), all instruments (11)
- Max Middleton – acoustic piano (1, 3, 4, 7, 9, 12), Fender Rhodes (3, 4, 7, 9, 12–14)
- Pete Wingfield – Hammond organ (2, 3, 5–7, 10, 12–14)
- Martin Ditcham – drums (1–9, 12–14), percussion (1, 4, 6)
- Julie Isaac – backing vocals (2, 5)
- Debbie Longworth – backing vocals (2, 5)

The Band

- Chris Rea
- Max Middleton
- Robert Ahwai
- Sylvan Marc
- Martin Ditcham

=== Production ===
- Chris Rea – producer
- Neil Amor – engineer
- Arun Chakraverty – mastering
- Tommy Willis – coordination
- Peacock – design, illustrations
- John Miller – cover painting
- John Knowles – management

== Charts ==
Chart performance for King of the Beach
Chart (2000–2001)	Peak position
Austrian Albums (Ö3 Austria)	13
German Albums (Offizielle Top 100)	11
Hungarian Albums (MAHASZ)	13
Polish Albums Chart	34
Swiss Albums (Schweizer Hitparade)	29
UK Albums (OCC)	26
