= Blue Guitars =

Box set by Chris Rea
- Released: 14 October 2005
- Recorded: May 2004–July 2005
- Genre: Blues
- Length: 614:42 (box set); 97:00 (2CD)
- Labels: Jazzee Blue & Edel Records
- Producers: Chris Rea, Andy Wilman

Chris Rea chronology
The Blue Jukebox (2004)	Blue Guitars (2005)	Heartbeats (2005)

Blue Guitars is the twenty-first studio album by British singer-songwriter Chris Rea, released on 14 October 2005 by his independent record label Jazzee Blue and Edel Records. The Blue Guitars album, packaged as a box set in the style of an earbook, consists of eleven CDs, one DVD and a full colour book, including paintings by the artist, liner notes and song lyrics. It is an ambitious project about blues music with the 137 songs recorded over the course of 18 months with a work schedule—according to Rea himself—of twelve hours a day, seven days a week. 2007 saw the release of a 2-CD "best of" compilation Blue Guitars: A Collection of Songs, which with individual albums can be also found in digital format.

Initially the project was inspired by Bill Wyman's Blues Odyssey and can be called an "odyssey" in its own right, for depicting a journey through the various epochs of blues music, starting at its African origins, then going through various American regional variations, different styles including Celtic & Irish and finishing with modern-time blues from the 1960s and 1970s.

The earbook album sold over 150,000 copies in Europe, and 170,000 until 2017. Several live exhibitions of the album's artwork paintings were held, like in October 2005 at The Cork Street Gallery, Central London, England, and Spazio Oikos, Milan, Italy.

According to 2005 De Standaard's review, it should be considered as Rea's "magnum opus", and in 2025 Blues Rock Review was described as "arguably the most ambitious blues-related project of the 21st century".

== Summary ==
The eleven separate records which comprise "Blue Guitars" provide a journey through the different epochs of the Blues, showing the various components that have been added to the original African Blues over time, the changes in instrumentation, style, lyrical expression and thematic implications.

Initially 16 CDs were planned, but Rea noted his initial idea was too intellectual and did not intend the collection to be seen as an academic work, but as a story. He noted that it's not meant to be played in one day, nor songs separately, as far as the thread can be followed, but nevertheless it should be enjoyed in a prolonged period of time. He also expressed concern about the digitalization of modern generations whose musical perception lacks the attitude for making the record listening a specific enjoyable experience.

Each of the albums' periods was studied in terms of their history and characteristics; the recording process and sessions in the studio were then organised using equipment which would have been used at the specific time, and the studio itself was set up in a way that would reproduce the sound quality of a studio of the time as closely as possible.

== Blue Guitars I – Beginnings ==
The first album of this set deals with the very beginnings of the Blues, tracing its ways back to its African roots.

Track listing

1. "West Africa" – 4:14
2. "Cry for Home" – 4:58
3. "The King Who Sold His Own" – 5:18
4. "White Man Coming" – 4:01
5. "Where the Blues Come From" – 6:18
6. "Lord Tell Me It Won't Be Long" – 4:58
7. "Work Gang" – 4:32
8. "Praise the Lord" – 4:41
9. "Sweet Sunday" – 5:38
10. "Sing Out the Devil" – 6:08
11. "Boss Man Cut My Chains" – 3:21

== Blue Guitars II – Country Blues ==
Track listing

1. "Walkin' Country Blues" – 3:40
2. "Man Gone Missing" – 4:40
3. "Can't Stay Blues" – 4:58
4. "KKK Blues" – 4:56
5. "Too Much Drinkin'" – 4:52
6. "Catwalk Woman" – 4:32
7. "If You've Got a Friend in Jesus" – 4:24
8. "Head Out on the Highway" – 4:32
9. "Wild Pony" – 4:10
10. "Steam Train Blues" – 3:50
11. "Going Up to Memphis" – 4:20
12. "Somewhere Between Highway 61 & 49" – 6:06
13. "Ticket for Chicago" – 5:16
14. "Dance All Night Long" – 4:31

== Blue Guitars III – Louisiana & New Orleans ==
Track listing

1. "Two Days Missing Down the Viper Room" – 2:56
2. "Who Cares If I Do" – 4:23
3. "What Made Me Love You" – 3:16
4. "You Got Dixie" – 4:41
5. "One Night with You" – 5:29
6. "Talking 'bout New Orleans" – 5:27
7. "Le Fleur de la Vie" – 3:13
8. "Catfish Girl" – 3:50
9. "Only a Fool Plays by the Rules" – 4:00
10. "Baby Come Home" – 3:30
11. "Dance avec moi" – 3:15
12. "L'ete eternal" – 3:31

== Blue Guitars IV – Electric Memphis Blues ==
Track listing

1. "Electric Guitar" – 4:42
2. "Electric Memphis Blues" – 4:15
3. "All Night Long" – 4:11
4. "Born Bad" – 3:46
5. "Let's Start Again" – 3:52
6. "What I'm Looking For" – 4:26
7. "Rules of Love" – 3:12
8. "What You Done to Me" – 3:28
9. "Hobo Love Blues" – 3:38
10. "Pass Me By" – 3:06
11. "The Soul of My Father's Shadow" – 3:52
12. "My Blue World Says Hello" – 4:06

== Blue Guitars V – Texas Blues ==
Track listing

1. "Lone Rider (Texas Blues)" – 4:44
2. "Texas Blue" – 5:10
3. "No Wheels Blues" – 5:02
4. "Lone Star Boogie" – 5:16
5. "Blind Willie" – 6:48
6. "The American Way" – 4:07
7. "Angellina" – 4:47
8. "Truck Stop" – 4:49
9. "Weekend Down Mexico" – 4:20
10. "Texas Line Boogie" – 4:41
11. "Too Big City" – 5:02
12. "Houston Angel" – 3:59

== Blue Guitars VI – Chicago Blues ==
Track listing

1. "I'm Moving Up (Chicago Blues)" – 4:30
2. "Maxwell Street" – 4:39
3. "Bob Taylor" – 5:15
4. "She's a Whole Heap of Trouble" – 2:30
5. "Jazzy Blue" – 3:24
6. "Hip-Sway" – 3:39
7. "That's the Way It Goes" – 3:32
8. "To Get Your Love" – 5:07
9. "Chicago Morning" – 4:56
10. "Catwalk Woman" – 3:35
11. "Since You've Been Gone" – 4:09
12. "All Night Long" – 5:27
13. "Here She Come Now" – 4:14

== Blue Guitars VII – Blues Ballads ==
Track listing

1. "Last Call (Blues Ballads)" – 3:41
2. "Maybe That's All I Need to Know" – 4:28
3. "Deep Winter Blues" – 5:09
4. "If I Ever Get Over You" – 5:08
5. "I Love the Rain" – 4:35
6. "My Soul Crying Out for You" – 3:38
7. "If That's What You Want" – 4:18
8. "There's No One Looking" – 5:34
9. "What Became of You" – 4:54
10. "My Deep Blue Ways" – 4:25

== Blue Guitars VIII – Gospel Soul Blues & Motown ==
Track listing

1. "Sweet Love" – 4:25
2. "Break Another Piece of My Heart" – 4:39
3. "Ball & Chain" – 5:08
4. "Gospel Trail" – 5:05
5. "Shy Boy" – 3:52
6. "Come Change My World" – 4:15
7. "Call on Me" – 4:10
8. "Just in Case You Never Knew" – 4:29
9. "Let Me In" – 5:52
10. "I'll Be There for You" – 4:18
11. "The Pain of Loving You" – 3:57
12. "Are You Ready" – 6:08

== Blue Guitars IX – Celtic & Irish Blues ==
Track listing

1. "Celtic Blue (Celtic and Irish Blues)" – 8:11
2. "Too Far from Home" – 7:28
3. "'Til the Morning Sun Shines on My Love and Me" – 5:39
4. "Lucky Day" – 5:16
5. "What She Really Is" – 5:03
6. "Wishing Well" – 4:11
7. "Irish Blues" – 4:14
8. "No More Sorrow" – 6:05
9. "While I Remain" – 5:30
10. "Last Drink" – 5:17
11. "'Til I Find My True Love's Name" – 3:42
12. "Big White Door" – 5:36

== Blue Guitars X – Latin Blues ==
Track listing

1. "Hey Gringo (Latin Blues)" – 6:04
2. "Immigration Blues" – 5:19
3. "Still Trying to Clear My Name" – 4:26
4. "Sun Is Hot" – 4:28
5. "Screw You and Your Deep Blue Sea" – 4:43
6. "Nothing Seems to Matter No More" – 3:55
7. "Sometimes" – 5:00
8. "Lampiou" – 5:46
9. "Keep on Dancing" – 3:56
10. "Lucifer's Angel" – 5:08
11. "How I Know It's You" – 4:17
12. "Forever" – 5:03
13. "You Got Soul" – 5:27
14. "Bajan Blue" – 4:57

== Blue Guitars XI – '60s and '70s ==
Track listing

1. "My Baby Told Me" (Blues) (60s/70s) – 2:55
2. "Got to Be Moving" – 4:03
3. "My Baby Told Me" (Gospel) – 3:19
4. "Heartbreaker" – 2:58
5. "Yes I Do" (instrumental) – 3:28
6. "Wasted Love" – 4:44
7. "Cool Cool Blue" – 4:15
8. "Clarkson Blues" – 5:09
9. "Who Killed Love" – 4:27
10. "Never Tie Me Down" – 4:13
11. "Mindless" – 3:55
12. "Ain't That Just the Prettiest Thing" – 5:20
13. "Nobody But You" – 3:55
14. "Waiting for Love" – 4:57
15. "Blue Morning in the Rain" – 4:50

== Dancing Down the Stony Road DVD ==
A making-of the Dancing Down the Stony Road album that Rea released in 2002, following the wake of his disease, his split with the record company and the process of coming to terms with his new style of music. The 75-minute DVD has interviews with Rea and the Band, footage from the writing and the recording sessions and a depiction of the process of making the album.

== Personnel ==
Musicians

- Chris Rea – acoustic piano, Hammond organ, harmonica, electric guitar, slide guitar, banjo, dobro, mandolin, bass, drums, percussion, calimba, balafon, vibraphone
- Ed Hession – accordion
- Robert Ahwai – guitar
- Gerry O'Connor – banjo
- Sylvin Marc – bass
- Martin Ditcham – drums

Production

- Producers – Chris Rea and Andy Wilman
- Author – Chris Rea
- Narrator – Richard Williams
- Executive producer – John Knowles
- Recording engineer – Edward McDonald
- Mixing – Douglas Dreger
- Editing – Aiden Farrell and Chris Rodmell
- Director – Robert Payton
- Production coordination – Janina Stamps
- Art direction and design – Jon Tricklebank
- Liner notes – Mark Edwards
- Photography – Stuart Epps

== Charts ==
2005 weekly chart performance for Blue Guitars
Chart (2005)	Peak position
Dutch Albums (Album Top 100)	29
UK Albums (Official Charts)	85
UK Independent Albums (Official Charts)	10
UK Jazz & Blues Albums (Official Charts)	4

2007 weekly chart performance for Blue Guitars
Chart (2007)	Peak position
French Albums (SNEP)	180

2008 weekly chart performance for Blue Guitars
Chart (2008)	Peak position
Hungarian Albums (MAHASZ)	37
