= The Return of the Fabulous Hofner Bluenotes =

Studio album by Chris Rea
- Released: 11 February 2008
- Recorded: July – November 2007
- Genre: Blues, rock
- Label: Jazzee Blue/EarBooks
- Producer: Chris Rea

Chris Rea chronology
Chris Rea: The Ultimate Collection 1978–2000 (2007)	The Return of the Fabulous Hofner Bluenotes (2008)	Still So Far to Go: The Best of Chris Rea (2009)

Professional ratings
Review scores
Source	Rating
laut.de	3/5 stars
Polityka	6/6 stars

The Return of the Fabulous Hofner Bluenotes is the twenty-second studio album by British singer-songwriter Chris Rea, released in February 2008 by his own record label, Jazzee Blue. It comprises three CDs and double 10" vinyl records in an 80-page hardback book. It is the second album of his project, the Hofner Blue Notes (2003).

== Summary ==
The project narrates the history of The Delmonts, an imaginary guitar instrumental band from the late 1950s, who in early 1960s evolved into blues band The Hofner Bluenotes. It also gives a brief history of the Hofner guitar, and its importance in the development of music in Britain. The book is lavishly illustrated with period photos and mocked up posters and newspaper cuttings about the band, together with some of Rea's paintings, and photos of Hofner guitars. The music was recorded by Rea (guitars), Colin Hodgkinson (bass) and Martin Ditcham (drums), who feature in the book, together with Neil Drinkwater and Robert Ahwai.

After the album was released, Rea started a European tour, including a show at London's Royal Albert Hall and Newcastle City Hall. He and his band would perform as a quintet The Fabulous Hofner Blue Notes. The concerts were divided in three sections: in the first, they would play only songs from Delmonts (CD1), then some blues songs from Fabulous Hofner Blue Notes (CD2), and in the third part Rea's greatest hits.

== Reception ==
In The Independent review was rated 3/5 stars. Alexander Cordas writing for laut.de gave it the same score, stating that The Delmonts music from the first CD is not for everyone because the homage "is entertaining, but rather in the sense of a winking glance towards the past", while The Hofners sometimes does not convince because it has "every now and then cliché-drenched" tracks which "sound neither dirty in the bluesy sense, nor exciting in their compositional aspect", concluding that "the overall package of the Hofner Bluenotes appeals with its appealing exterior".

== Tracks ==
CD 1: The Delmonts
(The same 16 tracks appear on the 2×10" vinyl records)

1. "Dirty New Town" – 2:25
2. "008 Jimmy Bond" – 3:30
3. "India Arab" – 3:06
4. "BB Was a Comanche" – 3:11
5. "Theme From 'the Pink Guitar'" – 2:25
6. "Russian Roulette" – 3:10
7. "Black Wave Heroes" – 3:31
8. "Andorra Star Blues" – 3:27
9. "Gippo Euro" – 2:48
10. "The Power of Love" – 3:45
11. "Big Storm Coming" – 3:01
12. "Race Fever Blues" – 2:35
13. "It's Behind You" – 2:11
14. "French Football" – 2:32
15. "Green Shirt Blues (For George Russell)" – 3:40
16. "Blue Miles" – 3:55

CD 2: The Hofner Bluenotes

1. "I Can't Wait for Love" – 3:49
2. "Speak of God, Act Like the Devil" – 4:37
3. "Big Wave" – 3:42
4. "Don't Give Your Ace Away" – 3:26
5. "Renaissance Blues" – 3:37
6. "Let's Getaway" – 3:50
7. "Legacy Blues" – 4:07
8. "Don't Tell Me About the Blues" – 4:35
9. "If I Keep My Faith in You" – 4:29
10. "The Shadow of a Fool" – 3:55
11. "Rock and Roll Tonight" – 3:28
12. "I Will Be with You" – 4:00

CD 3: The Hofner Bluenotes

1. "Twister Inside" – 4:11
2. "When the Truth Comes Out" – 3:22
3. "Because It's You" – 3:32
4. "Looking Glass Blues" – 4:07
5. "Blues for Janice" – 3:46
6. "Meet Me On the Mountain" – 4:25
7. "Skylark Blues" – 4:05
8. "Which Part of the Painting Made You Cry?" – 4:24
9. "The Days I Spent with You (Song for Bella)" – 3:32
10. "Yes I Do" – 4:14

== Personnel ==
=== The Hofner Bluenotes ===
- Chris Rea – vocals, guitars
- Neil Drinkwater – keyboards, acoustic piano
- Robert Ahawi – guitars
- Colin Hodgkinson – bass
- Martin Ditcham – drums, percussion

=== Production ===
- Chris Rea – producer, painting
- Tommy Willis – recording
- Jon Astley – mastering
- Sam Hadley – cover illustration
- Peacock (London, UK) – art direction, design
- Rex Features (UK) – 1960s lifestyle photography
- Mike Hill – guitar photography
- Mark Rea – Lotus Cortina photography
- John Knowles – management

== Charts ==
Chart performance for The Return of the Fabulous Hofner Bluenotes
Chart (2008)	Peak position
Dutch Albums (Album Top 100)	76
