= Forbes Spain =

Spanish language edition of Forbes magazine in Madrid, Spain

- Categories: Business magazine
- Frequency: Monthly
- Publisher: Spainmedia
- Founded: 2013
- Country: Spain
- Based in: Madrid
- Language: Spanish
- Website: forbes.es
- ISSN: 2255-4769
- OCLC: 1001327564

Forbes Spain is a monthly business magazine which was started in 2013. It is the 25th international edition of American business magazine Forbes. The publisher is SpainMedia, and the founding editor of the magazine was Andrés Rodríguez, chair of the SpainMedia. Forbes Spain is headquartered in Madrid.
