= Tennis (album) =

Studio album by Chris Rea
- Released: 1980
- Studio: Chipping Norton Recording Studios, Oxfordshire
- Genre: Album-oriented rock
- Length: 49:24
- Label: Magnet
- Producer: Chris Rea

Chris Rea chronology
Deltics (1979)	Tennis (1980)	Chris Rea (1982)

Professional ratings
Review scores
Source	Rating
AllMusic	3.5/5 stars

Tennis is the third studio album by British singer-songwriter Chris Rea, released in 1980. The album features two singles one of which includes a non-album B-side.

== Track listing ==
All words and music by Chris Rea

1. "Tennis" – 5:18
2. "Sweet Kiss" – 4:33
3. "Since I Don't See You Anymore" – 3:41
4. "Dancing Girls" – 4:02
5. "No Work Today" (instrumental) – 2:33
6. "Every Time I See You Smile" – 6:18
7. "For Ever and Ever" – 4:09
8. "Good News" – 3:54
9. "Friends Across the Water" (instrumental) – 3:45
10. "Distant Summers" – 2:10
11. "Only with You" – 3:42
12. "Stick It" – 5:19

== Singles ==
1. "Tennis" b/w "If You Really Love Me"
2. "Dancing Girls" b/w "Friends Across the Water"

== Personnel ==
=== Musicians ===
- Chris Rea – vocals, backing vocals, grand piano, keyboards, lead guitars, slide guitar, arrangements
- Graham Watson – keyboards, synthesizers, accordion
- Dave Burton – guitars
- Mick Hutchinson – Fender bass
- Norman Nosebait – drums
- Mark Rea – percussion
- Geoff Driscoll – "every type" of saxophones
- Raphael Ravenscroft – saxophones, brass arrangements
- Raúl Gonzáles – trombone, bass trombone
- Lee Thornburg – trumpet, brass arrangements
- Jimmy Chambers – backing vocals
- George Chandler – backing vocals
- Stuart Epps – backing vocals
- Watsoni – backing vocals
- Pete Wingfield – backing vocals

=== Production ===
- Chris Rea – producer
- Barry Hammond – engineer, mixing
- Hothouse – artwork
- David Magnus – inner sleeve photography

== Charts ==
Chart performance for Tennis
Chart (1980)	Peak position
Australian Albums (Kent Music Report)	60
UK Albums (OCC)	60
