= Hofner Blue Notes =

Studio album by Chris Rea
- Released: 28 July 2003
- Recorded: December 2002 – April 2003
- Genre: Blues
- Length: 50:29
- Label: Jazzee Blue
- Producer: Kiadan Quinn

Chris Rea chronology
Dancing Down the Stony Road (2002)	Hofner Blue Notes (2003)	The Blue Jukebox (2004)

Hofner Blue Notes is the nineteenth studio album by British singer-songwriter Chris Rea, released in July 2003 by his own record label, Jazzee Blue.

== Background ==
The album was part of series of largely instrumental blues and jazz albums released by his label Jazzee Blue and mostly fronted by his band members, of which this album was preceded by Rea's eighteenth studio and instrumental album Blue Street (Five Guitars) released on the same date in 2003 (peaked as #8 at the UK Jazz & Blues Albums Chart).

The album was part of Hofner Blue Notes, a project about Höfner guitar because Rea's first electric guitar was a 1961 Höfner V3 bought from a second-hand shop while he was working in his father's ice cream factory in early 1970s, and continued with The Return of the Fabulous Hofner Bluenotes in 2008.

== Track listing ==
1. "Spy" – 5:05
2. "Expectations" – 3:59
3. "Hofner Blue Notes" – 2:52
4. "Paris in Minneapolis" – 5:05
5. "São Paulo Blue" – 4:58
6. "What Became" – 4:44
7. "Detroit" – 3:54
8. "Goodnight Joe" – 4:15
9. "Take the Mingus Train" – 4:24
10. "Alone" – 3:39
11. "Saudi Blue" – 4:06
12. "Kestrel Avenue" – 3:28

== Personnel ==
- Chris Rea – all instruments, paintings
- Kiadan Quinn – producer
- Stuart Epps – engineer
- Stewart Eales – engineer
- Mainartery – album design
- John Knowles – management
- Recorded at Sol Mill Studios (Berkshire, England)
- Mastered at The Soundmasters (London, UK)

== Charts ==
Chart performance for Hofner Blue Notes
Chart (2003)	Peak position
UK Jazz & Blues Albums (OCC)	20
