= The Road to Hell: Part 2 =

Studio album by Chris Rea
- Released: 8 November 1999
- Recorded: April – August 1999
- Genre: Album-oriented rock
- Length: 58:24 or 63:36
- Label: East West
- Producer: Kiadan "K. Q." Quinn

Chris Rea chronology
The Blue Cafe (1998)	The Road to Hell: Part 2 (1999)	King of the Beach (2000)

Professional ratings
Review scores
Source	Rating
laut.de	2/5 stars

The Road to Hell: Part 2 is the fifteenth studio album by British singer-songwriter Chris Rea, released in November 1999, ten years after The Road to Hell. The single released for the album was "New Times Square". There was also a Japanese edition with the songs "Be My Friend" and "Driving Home for Christmas" included as tracks. It reached number 54 on the UK Albums Chart, and was certified Silver by BPI.

== Track listing ==
All songs by Chris Rea, except Track two by Martin Ditcham and Chris Rea.

1. "Can't Get Through" – 8:17
2. "Good Morning" – 5:23
3. "E" – 6:06
4. "Last Open Road" – 3:46
5. "Coming off the Ropes" – 5:44
6. "Evil No. 2" – 5:34
7. "Keep on Dancing" – 4:23
8. "Marvin" – 5:04
9. "Firefly" – 4:42
10. "I'm in My Car" – 4:39
11. "New Times Square" – 4:46
12. "The Way You Look Tonight" – 5:12 (not included on UK edition)

Japanese edition bonus tracks

12. "The Way You Look Tonight" – 5:12
13. "Be My Friend" – 4:57
14. "Driving Home for Christmas" – 4:00

== Personnel ==
=== Musicians ===
- Chris Rea – vocals, keyboards, guitars, arrangements
- Sylvin Marc – bass
- Martin Ditcham – drums
- Kiadan Quinn – drum programming
- Bud Beadle – saxophone
- Julie Isaac – backing vocals
- Debbie Longworth – backing vocals

=== Production ===
- Kiadan Quinn – producer
- Neil Amor – engineer
- Arun Chakraverty – mastering
- Tommy Willis – guitar and amplifier technician
- Tony Lodge – illustrations
- Jim Beach – management
- Peter Price – management

== Charts ==
Chart performance for The Road to Hell: Part 2
Chart (1999)	Peak position
German Albums (Offizielle Top 100)	16
Hungarian Albums (MAHASZ)	26
Swiss Albums (Schweizer Hitparade)	96
UK Albums (Official Charts)	54

== Certifications ==
Certifications for The Road to Hell: Part 2
Region	Certification	Certified units/sales
United Kingdom (BPI)	Silver	60,000^{^}
^{^} Shipments figures based on certification alone.
