= One Fine Day (Chris Rea album) =

Studio album by Chris Rea
- Released: 18 October 2019
- Recorded: 1980
- Studio: Chipping Norton Recording Studios
- Genre: Blues; rock
- Length: 35:15
- Label: Rhino Entertainment; 0190295424015
- Producer: Chris Rea; Jon Kelly

Chris Rea chronology
Road Songs for Lovers (2017)	One Fine Day (2019)

Professional ratings
Review scores
Source	Rating
Daily Express	4/5 stars

One Fine Day is the twenty-fifth and final studio album by British singer-songwriter Chris Rea, which was given a limited release on 18 October 2019 by Rhino Entertainment on CD and on vinyl. It is available in a hi-res digital format for streaming and download, and was subsequently included on disc 2 of Era 1: 1978–1984 (2020), a 3 CD compilation of singles, B-sides and rarities.

== Background ==
Rea announced that the album would be limited to 1000 copies. One Fine Day was originally recorded in 1980 at Chipping Norton Recording Studios and was produced by Rea himself. The compositions have never officially been released as a single work, so the present album unites this collection of nine songs for the first time. Some of the tracks have never been released, while other re-recorded versions have appeared on various albums and as B-sides on singles. Rea himself created the album cover a few years previously.

== Reception ==
Stefan Kyriazis of the Daily Express stated, "The endearing husky gravel of Rea’s voice, coupled with his undoubted guitar skills, ensures that his body of work remains in the rudest of health." Paul Whimpenny of Velvet Thunder wrote, "Chris Rea fans will immediately be drawn to the three new songs: If I Ever Break Free, an upbeat song with gospel touches in the chorus; Members Only, a fairly straight forward 12-bar blues tune; and One Night With You which sounds rather like Leonard Cohen being accompanied by an Oompah band! They are three pleasant songs but it’s certainly not a scandal that they haven’t been released before. The remaining six songs allow an interesting comparison with versions that were subsequently released, and in my view these original versions are often better. One Sweet Tender Touch is a case in point. It is recorded here brilliantly as a slow emotional bluesy song which sadly gets speeded up into a mainstream pop tune with the piano and Hammond replaced by a layer of sugary synths. Another chameleon-like song is Let Me Be The One, which originally appeared as a non-descript ballad on the B-side of Loving You, but here in its original guise is an infectious Springsteen-style rock’n’roll boogie... This album might not match up musically to those re-releases but it is a truly fascinating insight into the artist when on the cusp of that success."

One Fine Day debuted No. 67 on the iTunes Italian Albums Chart.

== Track listing ==
All tracks are written by Chris Rea.

No.	Title	Length
1.	"Do You Still Dream?"	4:10
2.	"Loving You"	3:54
3.	"One Fine Day"	4:05
4.	"One Sweet and Tender Touch"	4:43
5.	"If I Ever Break Free"	2:57
6.	"Sierra Sierra"	4:13
7.	"Members Only"	3:23
8.	"Let Me Be the One"	3:23
9.	"One Night with You"	4:31
Total length:		35:15

== Personnel ==
- Chris Rea – vocals, guitars
- Pete Wingfield – acoustic piano
- Jim Mullen – guitars
- Bruce Lynch – bass
- Dave Mattacks – drums

=== Production ===
- Chris Rea – producer, cover paintings
- Barry Hammond – engineer
