= The Blue Jukebox =

Studio album by Chris Rea
- Released: 22 March 2004
- Recorded: August – December 2003
- Studio: Sol Studios, Berkshire; Studio Guillaume Tell, Paris
- Genre: Blues, jazz
- Length: 66:13
- Label: Jazzee Blue/Edel
- Producer: Kiadan Quinn

Chris Rea chronology
Hofner Blue Notes (2003)	The Blue Jukebox (2004)	Blue Guitars (2005)

Professional ratings
Review scores
Source	Rating
laut.de	4/5 stars
The Press	5/5 stars
Rolling Stone	2/5 stars

The Blue Jukebox is the twentieth studio album by British singer-songwriter Chris Rea, released in March 2004 by his independent record label Jazzee Blue. The cover artwork is inspired by Edward Hopper's Nighthawks painting. Compared to the Dancing Down the Stony Road (2002) has a smoother and jazzier take on the blues.

== Summary ==
It is Rea's fourth studio album released since the founding of his independent record label Jazzee Blue in 2002 and release of Dancing Down the Stony Road, with which changed his music style from rock to blues oriented after his life-saving medic operation in the early 2000s. It was released with cardboard packaging, matt paper, reproduction of illustrations, and 20-page booklet.

== Reception ==
In The Press joint review with Eric Clapton's Me and Mr. Johnson, the album was given 5/5 stars considering it as "superb fusion of jazz and blues" in which guitar and piano are blended with saxophone among other instruments, highlighting the songs "Steel River Blues", "Restless Soul", "Long Is The Time", and "Hard Is The Road", and it is a "tribute to the influence Ry Cooder's style of guitar work" on his early career. Giuliano Benassi in a 4/5 star review for laut.de considered that "the result is a mix of blues and jazz that goes well with the cover: in fact, it gives the impression of listening to an endless loop in a rainy night of a jukebox. There is no gap filler or inferior material here". Music in Belgium also gave it the same score and concluded "it is an excellent CD with very dark climate. A special mention to the saxophonist who distills his masterful play throughout this album, but all the musicians are excellent". Jörn Schlüter for German edition of Rolling Stone gave it 2/5 stars. A reviewer of The Times commented, "The Blue Jukebox never matches, or tries to match, the raw intensity of Rea's Dancing Down the Stony Road. Instead, we get a smoother, jazzier take on the blues, although still with plenty of grit supplied by Rea's voice and his vibrant slide guitar, which slithers through."

== Track listing ==
All songs written and composed by Chris Rea

1. "The Beat Goes On" – 4:31
2. "Long Is the Time, Hard Is the Road" – 5:27
3. "Let's Do It" – 5:01
4. "Let It Roll" – 4:49
5. "Steel River Blues" – 4:34
6. "Somebody Say Amen" – 6:22
7. "Blue Street" – 4:48
8. "Monday Morning" – 4:14
9. "Restless Soul" – 5:51
10. "What Kind of Love Is This" – 6:37
11. "Paint My Jukebox Blue" – 4:01
12. "Baby Don't Cry" – 5:23
13. "Speed" – 5:05

== Personnel ==
=== Musicians ===
- Chris Rea – vocals, acoustic piano, slide guitar, bottleneck guitar, electric bass, harmonica
- Robert Ahwai – guitars
- Sylvin Marc – double bass, music director
- Thierry Chauvet-Peillex – drums
- Eric Seva – saxophone

=== Production ===
- Kiadan Quinn – producer
- Edward McDonald – engineer, mastering
- Richard Welland – design
- Paul Slater – cover illustration
- Chris Rea – inside painting
- Juan Carlos Ferrigno – inside painting
- John Knowles – management
- Mastered at The Soundmasters (London, UK)

== Charts ==
Chart performance for The Blue Jukebox
Chart (2004)	Peak position
Austrian Albums (Ö3 Austria)	41
Belgian Albums (Ultratop Flanders)	40
Belgian Albums (Ultratop Wallonia)	26
Dutch Albums (Album Top 100)	32
French Albums (SNEP)	133
German Albums (Offizielle Top 100)	30
Swiss Albums (Schweizer Hitparade)	49
UK Albums (OCC)	27
UK Independent Albums (OCC)	5
UK Jazz & Blues Albums (OCC)	4
