= La Passione (1996 film) =

1996 Italian film by John B. Hobbs

- Directed by: John B. Hobbs
- Written by: Chris Rea
- Starring: Sean Gallagher; Paul Shane; Shirley Bassey
- Release date: 14 November 1996 (BFI London)
- Country: United Kingdom

La Passione is a 1996 British drama film written and produced by Chris Rea, directed by John B. Hobbs, and starring Sean Gallagher, Paul Shane and Shirley Bassey. The film premiered on 14 November 1996 at the BFI London Film Festival. The film features a cameo appearance by Rea, as well the same-titled soundtrack also composed by him. The soundtrack reached the No. 43 position in UK Albums Chart, and was certified Silver by BPI in 1997.

== Background ==
The film was released in five British cities cinemas from 16 May 1997. It is a tale of 10-year-old northern boy, the son of an Italian immigrant ice-cream making family, who develops a lifelong obsession with motor racing and especially with the real-life racer Wolfgang Von Trips, who was killed in his sharknose Ferrari 156 at the Monza Grand Prix in 1961. The film is partially inspired by Rea's childhood experience. Rea commented how "everyone's got a Von Trips in their life ... for some people it happened through football or movies - a day when a boy's empty, innocent mind suddenly has all kinds of new stuff blown into it".

== Production ==
Rea initially wanted to direct his own screenplay but Warner Vision, the film's distributors, did not let him and appointed John B Hobbs, a retired television director. Rea commented that "there was a lot of hard work in making La Passione, and a lot of grief, because I had very set ideas about how I wanted it to be, and everyone else had a different idea ... I wanted none of it. My thing was about how fantasies occur, about passions, enjoying them." In a 2016 interview he recalls that Billy Connolly and Peter Capaldi were in advanced talks to star, but his original idea and script were changed. The primary idea was to be Warner Bros' first music DVD, "something to watch whilst you're listening to music". However, although they liked the idea and started to work on it, Rea lost complete control over it and under corporate pressure many people started to show up, with those especially from the United States not understanding the idea as it started to turn into, as Rea felt, a "boring film".

== Music ==
La Passione

Soundtrack album by Chris Rea
- Released: 11 November 1996
- Length: 54:50
- Labels: East West, Jazzy Blue
- Producer: Chris Rea

Chris Rea chronology
The Best of Chris Rea (1994)	La Passione (1996)	The Blue Cafe (1998)

Professional ratings
Review scores
Source	Rating
Louder Sound	3/5 stars

On the film soundtrack, Shirley Bassey provides vocals on two tracks: "La Passione" and a duet with Chris Rea entitled "Shirley Do You Own A Ferrari?" The song "La Passione" was a hit for Bassey. The soundtrack was redone in more recent times with new music, and was re-released in November 2015 in a deluxe package which consisted of two CDs, with remastered and remixed original and new tracks, and two DVDs, the first comprising re-edited original and new short films to accompany the music, and an interview with Rea, while the second has documentary about Wolfgang Von Trips. It was enclosed within a 72-page book.

=== Track listing ===
All songs by Chris Rea.

1. "La Passione" (Film Theme) – 4:55
2. "Dov'é il Signore?" – 6:04 (Vocals: Toby Draper; recorded at the Mill Studios Cookham 23/11/93)
3. "Shirley Do You Own a Ferrari?" (Vocals: Chris Rea/Shirley Bassey) – 4:43
4. "Girl in a Sports Car" – 5:16
5. "When the Grey Skies Turn to Blue" – 3:43
6. "Horses" – 3:05
7. "Olive Oil" – 4:26
8. "Only to Fly" – 5:42
9. "You Must Follow" – 5:29
10. "'Disco' La Passione" (Vocals: Shirley Bassey) – 4:57
11. "Dov'é il Signore? Part Two" – 2:31 (Vocals: Toby Draper)
12. "Le Mans" – 3:59
