= The Blue Cafe =

Studio album by Chris Rea
- Released: 19 January 1998
- Recorded: May – September 1997
- Studio: Studio Miraval (Provence, France)
- Genre: Album-oriented rock
- Length: 53:39; 67:38 including Japanese Bonus Tracks
- Label: East West
- Producer: Chris Rea

Chris Rea chronology
La Passione (1996)	The Blue Cafe (1998)	The Road to Hell: Part 2 (1999)

Music video
- "The Blue Cafe (Official Music Video)" on YouTube

Professional ratings
Review scores
Source	Rating
AllMusic	link

The Blue Cafe is the fourteenth studio album by British singer-songwriter Chris Rea, released in January 1998. The singles released for the album were "The Blue Cafe", "Thinking of You", "Sweet Summer Day" and "Square Peg, Round Hole". There was also a Japanese version with three bonus tracks, "Kyoto Blue", "Ameno Nakano Kiirono Herumetto" and "On the Beach". It was Rea's sixth successive album to reach the UK top ten, peaking at No. 10.

== Critical reception ==
The Irish Times noted the "menacing atmosphere" evident on the album, "rooted mostly in Rea's sandpaper voice. And the twisted blues lines he plays on guitar". "Shadows of the Big Man" is "focused, multifaceted...But best of all is the title song, The Blue Cafe. An album that is bound to be a pure delight for fans of the man."

== Track listing ==
All songs by Chris Rea.

1. "Square Peg, Round Hole" – 3:58
2. "Miss Your Kiss" – 4:05
3. "Shadows of the Big Man" – 4:49
4. "Where Do We Go from Here?" – 4:32
5. "Since I Found You" – 4:37
6. "Thinking of You" – 3:31
7. "As Long as I Have Your Love" – 4:44
8. "Anyone Quite Like You" – 4:49
9. "Sweet Summer Day" – 4:45
10. "Stick by You" – 4:05
11. "I'm Still Holding On" – 4:55
12. "The Blue Cafe" – 4:49

Japanese bonus tracks

13. "Kyoto Blue" – 4:44
14. "Ameno Nakano Kiirono Herumetto" – 4:12
15. "On the Beach" – 5:03

== Personnel ==
=== Musicians ===
- Chris Rea – vocals, guitars
- Max Middleton – keyboards
- Sylvin Marc – bass
- Martin Ditcham – drums, percussion

=== Production ===
- Chris Rea – producer
- Frédéric Blanc-Garin – engineer
- Ian Cooper – mastering at Metropolis Mastering (London, UK)
- Tommy Willis – guitar and amplifier technician
- John Carver – art direction
- Insect – design, artwork
- Brian R. Brown – photography
- Terry O'Neill – cover photography
- Jim Beach – management

== Charts ==
=== Weekly charts ===
Weekly chart performance for The Blue Cafe
Chart (1998)	Peak position
Australian Albums (ARIA)	178
Austrian Albums (Ö3 Austria)	20
Belgian Albums (Ultratop Flanders)	22
Belgian Albums (Ultratop Wallonia)	17
Dutch Albums (Album Top 100)	32
Finnish Albums (Suomen virallinen lista)	4
French Albums (SNEP)	43
German Albums (Offizielle Top 100)	7
Hungarian Albums (MAHASZ)	2
Norwegian Albums (VG-lista)	32
Scottish Albums (OCC)	20
Swedish Albums (Sverigetopplistan)	43
Swiss Albums (Schweizer Hitparade)	28
UK Albums (OCC)	10

=== Year-end charts ===
Year-end chart performance for The Blue Cafe
Chart (1998)	Position
German Albums (Offizielle Top 100)	66

== Certifications ==
Certifications for The Blue Cafe
Region	Certification	Certified units/sales
Belgium (BRMA)	Gold	25,000^{*}
Finland (Musiikkituottajat)	Gold	25,065
Poland (ZPAV)	Gold	50,000^{*}
United Kingdom (BPI)	Silver	60,000^{^}
^{*} Sales figures based on certification alone.^{^} Shipments figures based on certification alone.
