= Heaven (Chris Rea song) =

1991 single by Chris Rea

Single by Chris Rea

from the album Auberge
- B-side: "Theme from the Pantile Journals"
- Released: 25 March 1991
- Length: 4:14
- Label: EastWest
- Songwriter: Chris Rea
- Producer: Jon Kelly

Chris Rea singles chronology
"Auberge" (1991)	"Heaven" (1991)	"Looking for the Summer" (1991)

Music video
- "Heaven" on YouTube

"Heaven" is a song by British singer-songwriter Chris Rea, released on 25 March 1991 by East West Records as the second single from his 11th studio album, Auberge (1991). It was written by Rea and produced by Jon Kelly. "Heaven" reached No. 57 on the UK Singles Chart and remained in the top 100 for two weeks. The song's music video was directed by Nigel Dick and produced by Lisa Hollingshead. It was shot in London and in Dick's garage in California.

== Critical reception ==
In a review of Auberge, Mike Daly of The Age described "Heaven" as "serene" with "gorgeous guitars by Rea and Drennan". He also noted the song as being one of a number of tracks on Auberge to be "strong on optimism" with "positive statements". Deborah Hornblow of the Hartford Courant commented: "On the gentle, evocative "Heaven", the lines 'Happy, boy you bet I am; Holding onto this smile for just as long as I can' are enriched and counterpointed by the sound of Rea's low, heavily weathered rasp."

In a retrospective review, Johnny Loftus of AllMusic commented: "Auberge [contains] the thoughts and feelings of a man on a meandering road trip, thinking over the things he's said and done. "Heaven" seems to recall a time when the afterlife was in reach, but it could just as easily be the song of someone who's finally found his way."

== Track listings ==
- 7-inch and cassette single
1. "Heaven" – 4:14
2. "Theme from the Pantile Journals" – 4:10
- 12-inch single
1. "Heaven" – 4:14
2. "Theme from the Pantile Journals" – 4:10
3. "Teach Me to Dance" – 4:04
- CD single
1. "Heaven" – 4:14
2. "Stainsby Girls" – 4:07
3. "Josephine" – 4:34
4. "Tell Me There's a Heaven" – 6:02

== Personnel ==
Musicians

- Chris Rea – guitar, slide guitar, Hammond organ
- Anthony Drennan – acoustic guitar, dobro
- Robert Ahwai – bass
- Martin Ditcham – drums, percussion

Production

- Jon Kelly – producer (all tracks)
- Chris Rea – producer ("Stainsby Girls", "Josephine" and "Tell Me There's a Heaven"
- Justin Shirley-Smith – engineer on "Heaven"
- Russell Shaw – additional engineer on "Heaven"

Other

- Alan Fernley – illustration

== Charts ==
Chart (1991)	Peak position
Germany (GfK)	94
Ireland (IRMA)	30
UK Singles (Official Charts)	57
UK Airplay (Music Week)	25

== Release history ==
Region	Date	Format(s)	Label(s)	Ref.
United Kingdom	25 March 1991	7-inch vinyl; 12-inch vinyl; CD; cassette	EastWest	
Australia	6 May 1991	7-inch vinyl; CD; cassette	EastWest	
