= Whatever Happened to Benny Santini? =

Studio album by Chris Rea
- Released: April 1978
- Recorded: August–December 1977
- Studios: Moonlight Studios, London
- Genre: Rock
- Length: 38:20
- Labels: United Artists (United States)/ Magnet (rest of world)
- Producer: Gus Dudgeon

Chris Rea chronology
Whatever Happened to Benny Santini? (1978)	Deltics (1979)

Singles from Whatever Happened to Benny Santini?
- 1. "Fool (If You Think It's Over)" Released: 24 March 1978; 2. "Whatever Happened to Benny Santini?" Released: 16 June 1978

Professional ratings
Review scores
Source	Rating
AllMusic	2/5 stars

Whatever Happened to Benny Santini? is the debut studio album by the British singer-songwriter Chris Rea, released in 1978.

== Summary ==
The title of the album is a reference to a stage name which Rea's UK record label, Magnet Records, had considered giving him to make him sound more attractive commercially. The album peaked at number 49 on the Billboard 200, and charted for 12 weeks. It was certified a Gold album by RIAA on October 26, 1978.

The first single lifted from the album, "Fool (If You Think It's Over)", remains his biggest hit in the United States, peaking at number 12 on the Billboard Hot 100, charted for 15 weeks, and reaching number one on the Adult Contemporary Singles chart, and charting for 18 weeks. "Fool" was not a great success on the UK Singles Chart, failing to chart on its first release and only reaching number 30 when re-released later in 1978 to capitalise on its US success. This success was also helped by being played extensively by Radio Caroline, as it was dedicated to the British Home Office, who were trying to put the station off the air. The following single "Whatever Happened to Benny Santini?" peaked at number 71 on the Hot 100 chart, and charted for four weeks.

Whatever Happened to Benny Santini? was produced by Gus Dudgeon, who also produced most of Elton John's albums in the 1970s. Rea was reportedly dissatisfied with the final mix of the album; he later went some way to rectify this to his satisfaction starting with 1988's greatest hits compilation New Light Through Old Windows, where "Fool" was presented in a newly recorded version. Dudgeon went on to produce Rea's next effort, Deltics.

== Track listing ==
All songs by Chris Rea.

1. "Whatever Happened to Benny Santini?" – 4:22
2. "The Closer You Get" – 3:31
3. "Because of You..." – 3:57
4. "Dancing with Charlie" – 3:52
5. "Bows and Bangles" – 3:58
6. "Fool (If You Think It's Over)" – 4:47
7. "Three Angels" – 3:26
8. "Just One of Those Days" – 2:40
9. "Standing in Your Doorway" – 3:53
10. "Fires of Spring" – 3:54

== Singles ==
1. "Fool (If You Think It's Over)" b/w "Midnight Love"
2. "Whatever Happened to Benny Santini?" b/w "Three Angels"

== Personnel ==
- Chris Rea – vocals, synthesizers (1, 5–7), acoustic guitar (1, 3, 5, 8), slide guitar (1, 4, 7, 9), backing vocals (1, 3, 5, 6, 9, 10), electric guitar (2, 4, 5, 9), slide guitar solo (2), acoustic piano (3, 6), electric piano (3), Wurlitzer organ (3), lead guitar (7, 10), accordion (9)
- Rod Argent – electric piano (1), synthesizers (3)
- Pete Wingfield – acoustic piano (2, 4, 5, 10), organ (4, 5), electric piano (5, 6, 9), harpsichord (9)
- Paul Keogh – electric guitar (1–3, 5–8, 10), acoustic guitar (3, 8), rhythm guitar (7, 10)
- Eddie Guy – electric guitar (3), acoustic guitar (8)
- Pete Stanley – banjo (7)
- Pat Donaldson – bass (1)
- Dave Markee – bass (2, 4–6, 9, 10)
- Phil Curtis – bass (3, 7, 8)
- Dave Mattacks – drums (1–6, 9, 10)
- Norman Nosebait – drums (7, 8)
- Gus Dudgeon – tambourine (1, 4), percussion (4)
- Frank Ricotti – tambourine (2, 5, 7, 10), congas (3, 6, 7), shaker (3), vibraphone (6), temple block (6), cabasa (6)
- George Woodhead – clams (10)
- Steve Gregory – saxophone (1), sopranino saxophone (6)
- Richard Hewson – orchestra arrangements and conductor (6)
- Stuart Epps – backing vocals (1–7, 10)
- Doreen Chanter – backing vocals (9)
- Irene Chanter – backing vocals (9)

Technical

- Gus Dudgeon – producer
- Phil Dunne – engineer
- Stuart Epps – assistant engineer
- Ian Cooper – mastering at Utopia Studios (London, UK)
- Han-Chew Tham – cover photography
- Jubilee Graphics – sleeve and lyric sheet design

== Charts ==
Chart performance for Whatever Happened to Benny Santini?
Chart (1978)	Peak position
Australian Albums (Kent Music Report)	94
Canada Top Albums/CDs (RPM)	51
US Billboard 200	49
