= Chris Rea =

English musician and producer (1951–2025)

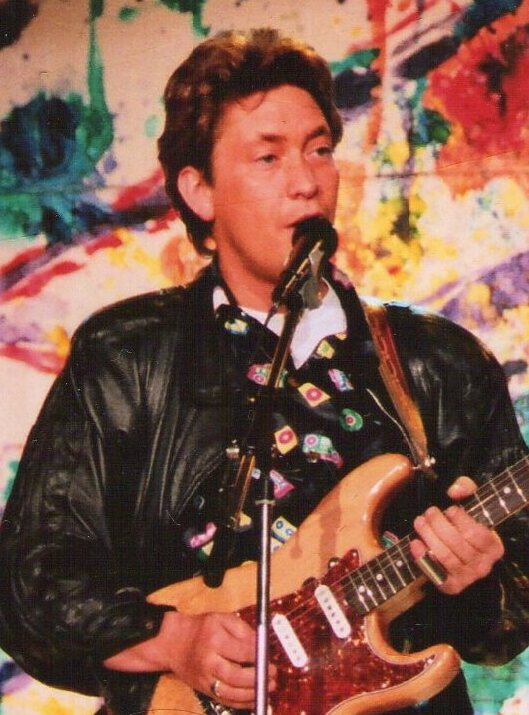
- Rea performing in the 1980s

Background information
- Born: Christopher Anton Rea; 4 March 1951; Middlesbrough, North Riding of Yorkshire, England
- Died: 22 December 2025 (aged 74) Berkshire, England
- Genres: Soft rock; blues
- Occupations: Singer-songwriter; musician; record producer
- Instruments: Vocals; guitar; keyboards
- Years active: 1973–2025
- Labels: Magnet; East West; Edel; Warner; Rhino; Jazzee Blue
- Website: chrisrea.com

Christopher Anton Rea (/ˈriːə/ REE-ə; 4 March 1951 – 22 December 2025) was an English rock and blues singer-songwriter, guitarist and record producer. He was known for his distinctive gravelly voice, slide guitar playing and music style blending soft rock with blues.

Rea recorded twenty-five studio albums beginning in the late 1970s. Although he had modest success with Water Sign (1983) and Wired to the Moon (1984), his commercial breakthrough came with Shamrock Diaries (1985), followed by platinum-sellers On the Beach (1986) and Dancing with Strangers (1987). Two of his million-selling albums topped the UK Albums Chart: The Road to Hell in 1989 and its successor, Auberge, in 1991. He had already become "a major European star by the time he finally cracked the UK Top 10" with the single "The Road to Hell (Part 2)". His commercial peak continued with God's Great Banana Skin (1992) and Espresso Logic (1993), and was marked by million-selling compilations New Light Through Old Windows (1988) and The Best of Chris Rea (1994), later also The Very Best of Chris Rea (2001, with three million copies sold by 2014).

His many hit songs included "I Can Hear Your Heartbeat", "Stainsby Girls", "Josephine", "On the Beach", "Let's Dance", "Driving Home for Christmas", "Working on It", "Tell Me There's a Heaven", "Auberge", "Looking for the Summer", "Nothing to Fear" and "Julia". He also recorded a duet with Elton John, "If You Were Me". He was nominated for the Brit Award for British Male Solo Artist in 1988, 1989 and 1990. Over the course of his long career, Rea's work had at times been informed by his struggles with serious health issues, which in the early 2000s influenced his change from adult-oriented rock to blues music style, releasing studio albums on his independent record label Jazzee Blue, such as Dancing Down the Stony Road (2002) and the 11-CD Blue Guitars (2005).

Rea never toured the United States, choosing family life over greater fame. In the U.S. he was best known for the 1978 single "Fool (If You Think It's Over)", which reached No. 12 on the Billboard Hot 100 and spent three weeks at No. 1 on the Adult Contemporary chart, earning him a Grammy nomination as Best New Artist in 1978. A decade later, "Working On It" topped the Mainstream Rock chart. He sold more than 30 million records worldwide.

== Life and career ==
=== Early life ===
Christopher Anton Rea was born on 4 March 1951 in Middlesbrough in the North Riding of Yorkshire to an Italian father, Camillo Rea, born in January 1922 in Guisborough, England (whose father, also called Camillo, was born in Arpino, Lazio, Italy) and an Irish mother, Winifred K. Slee. He was one of seven children. His family were of the Roman Catholic faith. The name Rea was well known locally due to his family's ice cream factory and café chain.

When he was twelve, Rea worked clearing tables in the coffee bar and making ice cream in the factory. He wanted to improve the business, but his ideas got no support from his father. After leaving, he was replaced by one of his brothers. At that time he wanted to be a journalist and attended St Mary's College, Middlesbrough. Rea bought his first guitar in his early twenties, a 1961 Höfner V3 and 25-watt Laney amplifier. He played primarily bottleneck guitar, also known as slide guitar. Even though he was left-handed, he played guitar right-handed. Rea's playing style was inspired by Charlie Patton, whom he had heard on the radio. He had initially thought Patton's playing sounded like a violin. Rea was also influenced by Blind Willie Johnson and Sister Rosetta Tharpe as well as by the playing of Ry Cooder and Joe Walsh. He also listened to Delta blues musicians such as Sonny Boy Williamson II and Muddy Waters, gospel blues, and opera to light orchestral classics to develop his style.

Rea recalled that "for many people from working-class backgrounds, rock wasn't a chosen thing, it was the only thing, the only avenue of creativity available for them", and that "when I was young I wanted most of all to be a writer of films and film music. But Middlesbrough in 1968 wasn't the place to be if you wanted to do movie scores." Due to his late introduction to music and guitar playing, Rea commented that when compared with Mark Knopfler and Eric Clapton "I definitely missed the boat, I think." He was self-taught and soon tried to join a friend's group, the Elastic Band, as the first choice for guitar or bass. Heeding his father's advice he did not join as his potential earnings would not have been enough to cover the costs of being in the group. As a result he found himself doing casual labouring jobs, including working in his father's ice cream business. Rea commented that, at that time, he was "meant to be developing my father's ice-cream cafe into a global concern, but I spent all my time in the stockroom playing slide guitar."

=== 1973–1982: Early career and "Fool (If You Think It's Over)" ===
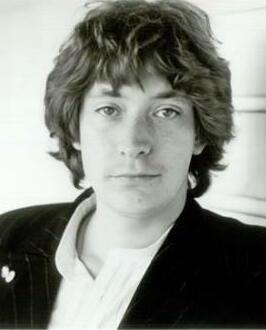
Rea in 1978

In 1973 he joined the local Middlesbrough band, Magdalene, which earlier had included David Coverdale who had left to join Deep Purple. He began writing songs for the band and took up singing only because the singer in the band failed to show up for a playing engagement. Rea then went on to form the band The Beautiful Losers which received Melody Maker's Best Newcomers award in 1973. He secured a solo recording deal with independent Magnet Records, and released his first single entitled "So Much Love" in 1974. The band itself split up in 1977. He guested on Catherine Howe's EP The Truth of the Matter. He recorded his first album that same year, but according to Michael Levy (co-founder of Magnet) the recordings were burned and started over again because it did not capture his whole talent.

==== Debut album ====
Rea's debut studio album, Whatever Happened to Benny Santini?, was produced by Gus Dudgeon and released in June 1978. The title referred to a stage name that Rea had suggested when the record label insisted that his given name did not sound "croony" enough. It peaked at No. 49 on the Billboard Hot 200 and charted for 12 weeks. The lead single, "Fool (If You Think It's Over)", was Rea's biggest hit in the US, reaching No. 1 on the Adult Contemporary Singles chart and No. 12 on the Billboard Hot 100. As Rea gave Magnet Records its first major breakthrough and its first US Top 10, he was their biggest artist, the more so when he was nominated at the 21st Annual Grammy Awards as Best New Artist.

Michael Levy remembered Rea as "more of a thoughtful, introspective poet than a natural pop performer" which in Levy's opinion prevented Rea from becoming a bigger star. Few of Rea's early singles charted in the UK. "Fool (If You Think It's Over)" performed modestly on its second release in late 1978, prompted by its strong performance in the US, and that stateside success also led to Rea being categorized as a piano-playing singer-songwriter, similar to Elton John and Billy Joel, rather than the guitar player he is. For several years, Magnet marketed him based on this misconception. Rea said that it "is still the only song I've ever not played guitar on, but it just so happened to be my first single". Rea had "always had a difficult relationship with fame, even before my first illness. None of my heroes were rock stars. I arrived in Hollywood for the Grammy Awards once and thought I was going to bump into people who mattered, like Ry Cooder or Randy Newman. But I was surrounded by pop stars". Throughout his career Rea emphatically rejected the label of "rock star".

==== Subsequent early albums ====
Dudgeon also produced Rea's second album Deltics (1979). Rea recorded his self-produced third album, Tennis (1980), with musicians from Middlesbrough, and it received positive reviews. As both albums had failed commercially, Magnet rejected the artwork Rea wanted for the cover of his fourth album, 1981's Chris Rea (produced by Jon Kelly, who later oversaw Rea's most successful albums). None of these albums reached the Top 50 in the UK, with his singles also delivering lacklustre performances, although in the US, Diamonds reached No. 44 on the Billboard Hot 100 and Loving You went to No. 88. Rea had a difficult working relationship with Dudgeon and the other "men in suits" who he felt "smoothed out" the blues-influenced elements of his music. Rea "always thought that [producers] knew best. I never thought for a minute that they might have another agenda", but "all of a sudden I was the goose that laid the golden egg, and it was hell for me". He ruefully acknowledges, "I can't blame anyone but myself. I gave them what they wanted rather than what I wanted".

=== 1983–1988: European breakthrough ===
==== Water Sign and Shamrock Diaries ====
From 1983, Rea's music began to better reflect his wishes and capabilities, despite pressure from his record company due to the accumulated costs of the production for his first four albums. To keep costs low, the label decided to release the demo tapes of his fifth studio album Water Sign. It was the first of several successful albums on which Rea collaborated with producer David Richards. He also changed managers and went on a UK club tour, followed by a 60-date tour as a support act for Canadian band Saga.

Water Sign performed far better than Rea or his team expected in Ireland and Europe, selling over half a million copies in just a few months. The single I Can Hear Your Heartbeat charted in Europe. With the album's success along with that of the subsequent Wired to the Moon (1984), which was his first Top 40 album in the UK (reaching No. 35), Rea began to focus his attention on touring continental Europe and building up a fan base. He established a loyal following in West Germany, and believes this audience saved his career as there was no "image-led market", allowing him to succeed "by music and by word of mouth". It was not until 1985's million-selling Shamrock Diaries, with its hit singles Stainsby Girls and Josephine, written for his wife and daughter respectively, UK audiences began to take notice of him.

==== On the Beach and Dancing with Strangers ====
His international fame grew with the million-selling studio albums On The Beach (1986), and Dancing with Strangers (1987) which reached No. 2 on the UK albums chart, behind Michael Jackson's Bad, and which included his first Top 20 UK single, "Let's Dance", which reached No. 12. In 1986, Rea was a support act along with The Bangles and The Fountainhead for Queen at Slane Concert for an estimated 80,000 audience. He also performed at Milano Suono festival at stadium San Siro, Italy. By 1987, Rea was finally in a position to pay off the £320,000 debt he owed to the record company, and started to make significant earnings. He signed with Warners, who also bought Magnet Recordings. That year, the Dancing with Strangers world tour sold out stadium-sized venues, including two shows at Wembley Arena, and included Rea's first concerts in Australia and Japan. Rea's American label, Tamla Motown, had told him that he should go to America and tour there for three years. Out of deference to his family, he did not do so. He commented that at the time he realized that "I could be as big as I liked, if I was prepared to do the touring".

==== New Light Through Old Windows ====
Rea's next album was his first compilation – albeit an unconventional one, as most songs were new versions of older releases. New Light Through Old Windows (1988) was another million seller, climbing to No. 5 in the UK. The album included re-workings of some of his charting singles, as well as a reworking of his recent single "Driving Home for Christmas". Some of the tracks were successful in the US, including Working On It, which reached No. 73 on Billboard Hot 100 and topped the Mainstream Rock chart. The re-recorded version of On the Beach reached the Top 10 on the US Adult Contemporary chart, and No. 12 in the UK. The album's release and success was followed by an international tour with over 45 dates.

=== 1989–1994: Chart dominance, The Road to Hell and Auberge ===
Rea's tenth studio album was his major breakthrough. The Road to Hell (1989) enjoyed massive success and became his first No. 1 album in the UK, being certified 6× Platinum by the BPI in 2004. While the album peaked at No. 107 in the US, the single The Road to Hell (Part 2) climbed to No. 11 on the US Mainstream Rock chart, and was Rea's first and only UK Top 10 single, until perennial favourite Driving Home For Christmas also reached the top 10 in 2021 and again, shortly after his death in 2025. The song Texas achieved extensive radio airplay in the state itself. In December 1989, Rea performed on the Band Aid II single "Do They Know It's Christmas?" In 1991, Auberge repeated its predecessor's success, reaching No. 1 in the UK albums chart, and was another hit across Europe. The single of the same title made the UK Top 20. Even at the peak of his success, Rea refused to mount an American tour or perform on MTV Unplugged, although he was a guest on Late Night with David Letterman, and also performed on the show. Rea said his neglect of the US market was one of his biggest mistakes because "every time I see a car that's too much money, I definitely regret it, just for five minutes".

After Auberge, Rea released God's Great Banana Skin (1992) which reached No. 4 in the UK, while the single Nothing to Fear gave him another Top 20 hit. A year later the album Espresso Logic made the Top 10 and Julia, written about his second daughter, gave him his sixth and last Top 20 single. The album was partly promoted by Rea's taking part in the non-Championship "TOCA Shootout" round of the 1993 British Touring Car Championship, although he was eliminated in the first round. In 1994 another compilation album, The Best of Chris Rea, was released which peaked at No. 3 in UK. That July, Rea performed with Peter Gabriel and others at Sonoria festival in Milan.

=== 1995–2005: Recovery from illness, return to blues roots and Blue Guitars ===
In 1996 released a soundtrack album for La Passione, which Rea also wrote and produced. Two years later in 1998 The Blue Cafe, his fourteenth studio album, followed. In 1999, ten years after The Road to Hell, the dance and electronic infused The Road to Hell: Part 2 failed to reach the UK Top 40. Rea rebounded in 2000, when King of the Beach made it to the UK Top 30.

In an interview, he said, "it's not until you become seriously ill and you nearly die and you're at home for six months, that you suddenly stop, to realize that this isn't the way I intended it to be in the beginning. Everything that you've done falls away and you start wondering why you went through all that rock business stuff." A record company offered him millions of dollars to do a duets album with notable artists. Having promised himself that if he recovered, he would return to his blues roots, he started the record label Jazzee Blue to free himself from his then current company's expectations. The first album under this label, Dancing Down the Stony Road (2002), reached No. 14 and was certified Gold by the BPI. He wanted the label to be a place "where musicians came and made a record" of this style of music. Jazzee Blue released several blues and jazz albums mostly by members of his then current band. He was disappointed with the music business when Michael Parkinson, who supported him to do Dancing Down the Stony Road, told him songs longer than three minutes were not played as often on radio anymore.

In 2003, Rea released Blue Street (Five Guitars) and Hofner Blue Notes, and The Blue Jukebox the following year. 2005 saw the release of Blue Guitars, a box set of 11 CDs containing 137 blues-inspired tracks with Rea's paintings as album covers, which is a once in a lifetime ambitious project about the history of blues music. Rea said, "I was never a rock star or pop star and all the illness has been my chance to do what I'd always wanted to do with music [...] the best change for my music has been concentrating on stuff which really interests me".

=== 2006–2015: Continuation of blues albums and tours ===
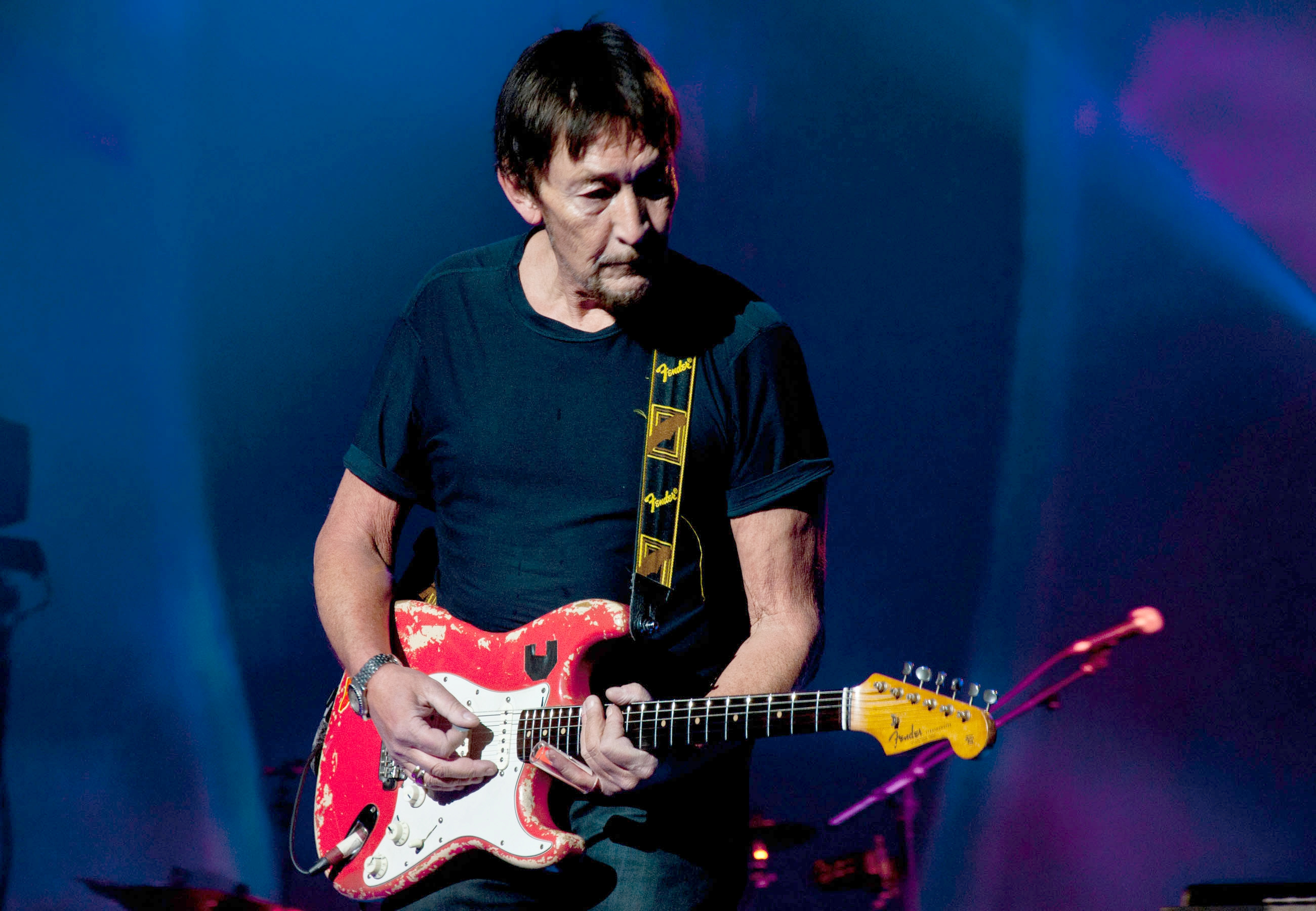
Rea playing his Fender Stratocaster "Pinky" at the Congress Hall in Warsaw, 2012

In February 2008, Rea released The Return of the Fabulous Hofner Bluenotes, dedicated to the 1960s Höfner guitars, with 38 tracks on three CDs and two 10" vinyl records – the vinyl replicated the tracks contained on the first CD of the set. The box set also included a hardback book of his paintings along with period photos. The release of the album was followed by a European tour, visiting various venues across the UK, including the Royal Albert Hall in London. Part of the tour was recorded and released as a live DVD and his first live album, The Road to Hell & Back, to positive reviews.

Rea released the compilation Still So Far to Go in October 2009 which contained some of his best known (and lesser known) hits over the last thirty years as well as songs from his "blues" period. Two new songs were included, "Come So Far, Yet Still So Far to Go" and the ballad "Valentino". The album reached No. 8 and was certified Gold by the BPI. Rea started the European tour called "Still So Far to Go" in January 2010. His special guest on stage was Irish musician Paul Casey. The tour ended on 5 April at Waterfront Hall in Belfast. In September 2011 Santo Spirito Blues box set was released. The set contained two feature-length films on one DVD written and directed by Rea along with three accompanying CDs – two of which featured the music from the DVDs and the third being a stripped back version of the related studio album. Shortly after this release, in October and November, Rea underwent two surgical procedures. On 3 February 2012 the Santo Spirito Tour started at Congress Center Hamburg in Hamburg, Germany, with additional visits to Poland, Russia, Ukraine, Hungary, Switzerland, Netherlands, Belgium and France. The United Kingdom part of the tour commenced in the middle of March and finished on 5 April at Hammersmith Apollo in London.

November 2014 saw Rea embark on a European tour called The Last Open Road Tour, with the UK part of the tour commencing on 1 December in Manchester and ending on 20 December in London. He also performed for the fifth time in his career at the Montreux Jazz Festival.

=== 2016–2025: Further illness, recovery, and retrospectives ===
In September 2017, he released his twenty-fourth album, Road Songs for Lovers, and embarked on a European tour starting in October until December. On 9 December, Rea collapsed during a performance at the New Theatre Oxford, the 35th concert of the tour. He was taken to hospital where his condition was stabilized. This health issue caused the last two concerts of the tour to be cancelled. In December 2020, Rea guest starred on the Christmas edition of Mortimer & Whitehouse: Gone Fishing, where he discussed his health issues over the years.

On 18 October 2019, Rhino released 2CD deluxe editions of five of Chris Rea's most commercially successful studio albums, Shamrock Diaries, On The Beach, Dancing With Strangers, The Road To Hell, and Auberge. Each contains a remastered version of the original album on the first disc, and remixes, rare and previously unreleased live tracks, single edits, and extended versions on the bonus disc. On 4 October, One Fine Day had been released, limited to 1000 numbered copies. The album contains tracks recorded in 1980 at Chipping Norton Recording Studios, most of which had never been released. On 20 November 2020, the triple CD compilation Era 1: 1978 – 1984 was released. It contains a mix of A-sides, B-sides, foreign language versions and different mixes, as well as all of One Fine Day on disc 2.

== Musicianship ==
=== Guitars ===
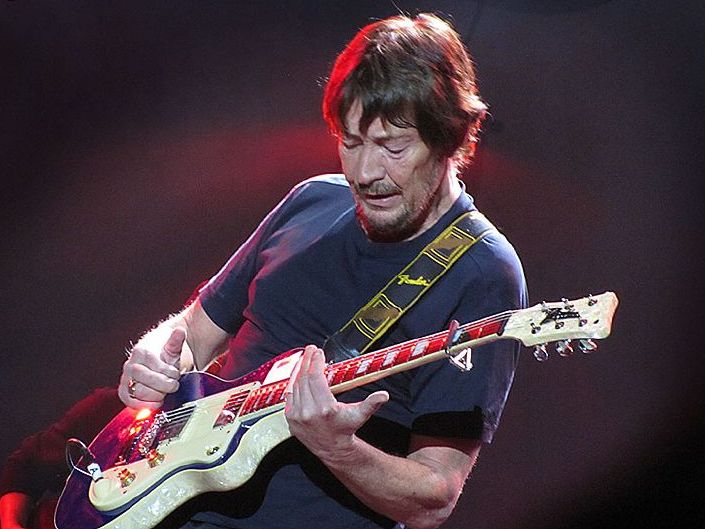
Rea playing his Italia Maranello "Bluey" at the Heineken Music Hall, Amsterdam, 2010

Rea's first guitar was a Höfner V3 or 173 which he bought in a second-hand shop because, at the time, there were not that many shops in Middlesbrough where one could purchase a guitar. He played the V3 until 1979, although, by Rea's reckoning, it was a "dreadful guitar with an appalling action, but playing slide it didn't matter". During his career the guitar most associated with him was a 1962 Fender Stratocaster which he called "Pinky". Rea bought the instrument after seeing a Ry Cooder concert at the City Hall in Newcastle. The guitar was once submerged in water for a prolonged time, which made it more mellow in sound compared to the classic hard Stratocaster sound. Since 2002 Dancing Down the Stony Road, his main guitar was an Italia Maranello which he named "Bluey".

=== Filmography ===
One of Rea's childhood dreams was to become a film writer and film music composer. He wrote the title track and music score for the 1993 drama film Soft Top Hard Shoulder. He wrote and produced the 1996 film La Passione, partially inspired by Rea's childhood experience of falling in love with motor racing and F1 Ferrari's driver Wolfgang von Trips. Rea was the lead actor in the 1999 comedy film Parting Shots, alongside Felicity Kendal, John Cleese, Bob Hoskins and Joanna Lumley. Rea, ironically, played a character who was told that cancer gave him six weeks to live and decided to kill those people who had badly affected his life. Afterwards, two feature-length films were made for the Santo Spirito Blues project, just "so that I could do the music".

=== References in lyrics ===
Rea acknowledged that several of his songs were "born out of Middlesbrough", his hometown. The verse "I'm standing by a river, but the water doesn't flow / It boils with every poison you can think of" from "The Road to Hell", the songs "Steel River" which refers to a nickname for the River Tees, and "Windy Town", reflect Rea's feelings about the industrial decline of Middlesbrough and the re-development of the town centre while he was out of the country touring through the years:

I went back to see my father after my mother had died and [they] had knocked the whole place down. I'd been gone three years, hard touring in Europe. I literally went to drive somewhere that wasn't there. It was like a sci-fi movie. The Middlesbrough I knew, it's as if there was a war there 10 years ago.

I miss the bits of Middlesbrough that aren't there any more. It's very hard to accept that Ayresome Park no longer exists. I know I sound very old when I say things like that. Those terraced streets are no longer there. But I miss the old character of the place, the guys with the fruit barrows and all that.

== Personal life and death ==
=== Family life ===
Rea was married to Joan Lesley, with whom he had been in a relationship since they met as teenagers on 6 April 1968 in their native Middlesbrough. They had two daughters, both of whom had songs named after them ("Josephine" and "Julia"). Rea used to live in Cookham, Berkshire, where he owned Sol Mill Recording Studios and produced some of his later albums. When he was not writing songs, other interests particularly included painting. Rea said that he liked to "read a lot and even though I chose music, journalism was my first passion. I wanted to be a journalist and write about car racing [...] somewhere deep down I believe I could have been a decent journalist".

=== Cars and motor racing ===
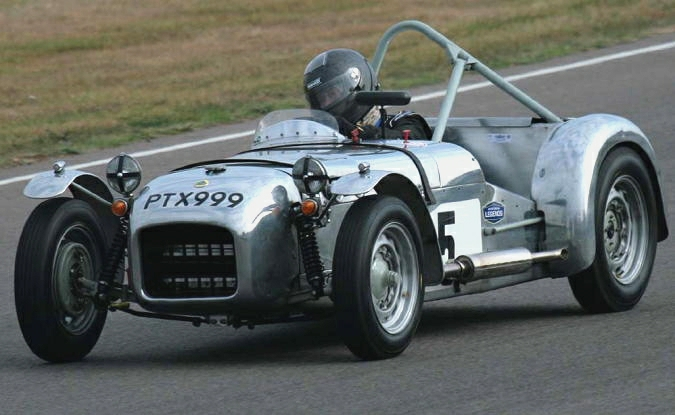
Rea racing in his Lotus 6 at the Goodwood Revival 2009

Rea was a fan of historic motor racing and raced a Ferrari Dino, a Ferrari 328, and a 1955 Lotus 6. In 1993, he participated in the 1993 British Touring Car Championship ToCa shootout as a guest driver. He owned and raced the 1964 Lotus Elan 26R, and the well known Caterham 7 from the Auberge album cover, until it was sold in 2005 with all proceeds (£11,762) going to the charity NSPCC. He also owned the Ferrari 330 which was used as a donor car for the replica of Ferrari 250 Le Mans used in the 1996 movie La Passione. In 2014, he was completing a 22-year restoration of an original replica of a Ferrari 156 Sharknose Formula One racing car. He also joined the Historic Racing Drivers Club, where he drove a 1957 Morris Minor 1000 police car.

He took the opportunity to get involved in Formula One on a few occasions, including as a pit lane mechanic for the Jordan team during the 1995 Monaco Grand Prix. He recorded a song, "Saudade", in tribute to three-time Formula One world champion Ayrton Senna. It featured prominently in the BBC documentary movie.

=== Politics ===
In an interview, amid the 2017 general election, Rea supported Jeremy Corbyn and wrote a song called "What's So Wrong with a Man Who Tells the Truth?", saying "in the old way, Corbyn is useless. Because he says the wrong things. But the young people have had enough." Rea considered that the politicians and government of the UK and EU became out of touch with the common people. He was sceptical about the idea of the unification of Europe because with a common European market "you ... force different people to live together [when] they simply do not want to", recalling the downfall of Yugoslavia.

=== Health issues ===
In 1994, Rea had developed stomach ulcers. The following year, he "got peritonitis and nearly died. Facing the prospect of never singing, touring or performing in public again, he characteristically embarked on a radical career shift and went into movies."

Rea had pancreatic cancer in 2001 and underwent a Whipple procedure, which resulted in the removal of the head of the pancreas and part of the duodenum, bile duct, and gall bladder. After having that surgery, Rea had problems with diabetes and a weaker immune system, requiring him to take thirty‑four pills and have seven injections a day. He underwent several subsequent operations. Nevertheless, he found greater appreciation for life, his family, and the things he loved.

Rea suffered a stroke in 2016, which left him with slurred speech and reduced movement in his arms and fingers. Soon afterwards he quit smoking to reduce the risk of further strokes and recovered enough to record and tour.

=== Death ===
Rea died in hospital on 22 December 2025, aged 74, following a short illness. He was the third of his siblings to die within recent months.

== Legacy ==
His death prompted many tributes, including local tributes from Middlesbrough mayor Chris Cooke, who remarked that Rea had "helped put Middlesbrough on the map", and Middlesbrough F.C., which expressed that it was "deeply saddened" and referred to him as a "Teesside icon".

Neil McCormick of The Daily Telegraph wrote that "any musician would feel proud to have penned songs half as gorgeous and touching as his". Alexis Petridis of The Guardian explained that he "bristled against his record companies, his producers and fame itself – but that friction ignited both his AOR hits and his raw, spirited take on the blues", but also how in his blues part of career "he could be sniffy, even dismissive about the music that had made him famous, which didn't seem entirely fair: Rea was genuinely gifted at pop-facing AOR". Adam Sweeting of The Guardian noted that Rea "proved that it was possible to become a big-selling international artist while remaining low-key and publicity-shy". Ed Power of The Irish Times said that "it was that reluctance to be a pop star that made him such a memorable presence in the charts" and his hits "were beautifully catchy, but they were threaded through with a soulfulness that set Rea apart from peers such as Phil Collins and Sting".

Bruno Lesprit of French Le Monde described him as an "antistar", Arne Willander of German edition of Rolling Stone as a "silent master", and Sopan Deb of The New York Times as a "virtuosic slide guitarist" and "versatile" singer-songwriter. Jakob Biazza of German Süddeutsche Zeitung considered him a "great blues guitarist and singer who was far too long misunderstood as a soft rocker". Hrvoje Horvat of Croatian Večernji list also argued that he "was a far more serious musician and a great guitarist, who did much more significant things in his career than these most famous songs that most people remember him for ... was at his best when he moved away from the pop format".

Francesco Fusi of Forbes Spain described how Rea's "signature style was always a highly personal blend of rock, pop, and blues ... beyond sales figures and accolades, Chris Rea's legacy lies in having built an honest and recognizable body of work, free of artifice and grounded in a clear artistic identity". Dan Mc Sword of Italian Gente described how "his songs, with their captivating melodies, evocative lyrics and authentic sensitivity have accompanied many moments in our lives ... he was serious, credible, and devoid of rhetoric: that's why his songs have over time become an enduring part of the soundtrack of our lives". Hungarian singer Charlie emphasized his modesty and kindness, and having a "musical legacy that few people have. It had a great influence on many singers and musicians, including me".

Jon Harper of Blues Rock Review in 2025 concluded that Rea's work has an underrated legacy in blues rock due to several factors (geography, pop beginnings, avoidance of fame, timing), which "deserves serious study", especially the Blue Guitars (2005), "arguably the most ambitious blues-related project of the 21st century".

== Discography ==
=== Studio albums ===
- Whatever Happened to Benny Santini? (Magnet, 1978)
- Deltics (Magnet, 1979)
- Tennis (Magnet, 1980)
- Chris Rea (Magnet, 1981)
- Water Sign (Magnet, 1983)
- Wired to the Moon (Magnet, 1984)
- Shamrock Diaries (Magnet, 1985)
- On the Beach (Magnet, 1986)
- Dancing with Strangers (Magnet, 1987)
- The Road to Hell (WEA, 1989)
- Auberge (EastWest, 1991)
- God's Great Banana Skin (EastWest, 1992)
- Espresso Logic (EastWest, 1993)
- La Passione (soundtrack, EastWest, 1996)
- The Blue Cafe (EastWest, 1998)
- The Road to Hell: Part 2 (EastWest, 1999)
- King of the Beach (EastWest, 2000)
- Dancing Down the Stony Road/Stony Road (Jazzee Blue, 2002)
- Blue Street (Five Guitars) (Jazzee Blue, 2003)
- Hofner Blue Notes (Jazzee Blue, 2003)
- The Blue Jukebox (Jazzee Blue, 2004)
- Blue Guitars (Jazzee Blue, 2005)
- The Return of the Fabulous Hofner Bluenotes (Jazzee Blue, 2008)
- Santo Spirito Blues (Jazzee Blue, 2011)
- Road Songs for Lovers (Jazzee Blue, 2017)
- One Fine Day (Rhino, limited release, 2019)
