= Julia (Chris Rea song) =

1993 single by Chris Rea

Single by Chris Rea

from the album Espresso Logic
- B-side: "I Thought I Was Going to Lose You"
- Released: 11 October 1993
- Genre: Soft rock
- Length: 3:56
- Label: EastWest
- Songwriter: Chris Rea
- Producer: Chris Rea

Chris Rea singles chronology
"Too Much Pride" (1993)	"Julia" (1993)	"Espresso Logic" (1993)

Music video
- "Julia (Official Music Video)" on YouTube

"Julia" is a song by British singer-songwriter Chris Rea, released on 11 October 1993, by East West Records, as the lead single from his 13th studio album, Espresso Logic (1993). The song, both written and produced by Rea, was dedicated to Rea's daughter Julia Christina, who was four years old at the time of its release. It reached No. 18 in the UK and remained on the UK Singles Chart for five weeks.

== Critical reception ==
On its release, Larry Flick from Billboard magazine wrote, "After making friends at album rock radio with this bouncy tune, Rea aims for adult pop audiences. Track has layers of interesting, ear-catching sounds, the best of which are fluid guitar lines and echoed backing vocals. Happy li'l single should have no trouble winning the hearts of adult-oriented radio programmers." Pan-European magazine Music & Media noted its "hard hammering drums" and added that the song was the "first sensation of the [Espresso Logic] album's fine aroma".

Alan Jones from Music Week gave it a score of three out of five, writing, "'Burundi Black'-style tribal drums usher in one of Chris Rea's less intense tracks, a pleasant bop-along song. Rea's fans are used to more weighty fare, but once they get over the shock they'll warm to it." In a review of Espresso Logic, Allen Howie of The Courier-Journal commented, "Rea's most potent songs are personal, rather than political. When he's content with his lot in life, as in the sunny 'Julia', there's no keeping the smile from your face." Rob Caldwell of AllMusic described the song as a "bright rhythm driven song". In a review of the 1994 compilation The Best of Chris Rea, Katherine Monk of The Vancouver Sun described the song as "locomotive".

== Music video ==
The accompanying music video for "Julia" shows the band playing on the stage in black and white and Rea's daughter Julia Christina swimming in the sea, running on the beach and spend time with her father and older sister in color.

== Track listings ==
- 7-inch single
1. "Julia" – 3:56
2. "I Thought I Was Going to Lose You" – 5:00
- CD single (German release)
1. "Julia" – 3:56
2. "I Thought I Was Going to Lose You" – 5:01
3. "Jordan 191" – 4:02

== Personnel ==
- Chris Rea - vocals, guitar, producer
- Linda Taylor - backing vocals
- Sylvin Marc - bass
- Martin Ditcham - drums, percussion
- Stuart Epps - engineer
- Tommy Willis - guitar technician
- Stylorouge - sleeve design

== Charts ==
Chart (1993)	Peak position
Europe (Eurochart Hot 100)	54
Europe (European Hit Radio)	7
Germany (GfK)	40
Iceland (Íslenski Listinn Topp 40)	22
UK Singles (OCC)	18
UK Airplay (Music Week)	11

== Release history ==
Region	Date	Format(s)	Label(s)	Ref.
United Kingdom	11 October 1993	7-inch vinyl; CD; cassette	EastWest	
Australia	10 January 1994	CD; cassette	EastWest	
