= Auberge (song) =

1991 single by Chris Rea

Single by Chris Rea

from the album Auberge
- B-side: "Hudson's Dream"
- Released: 4 February 1991
- Length: 7:18 (album version); 4:40 (single version)
- Label: EastWest
- Songwriter: Chris Rea
- Producer: Jon Kelly

Chris Rea singles chronology
"Texas" (1990)	"Auberge" (1991)	"Heaven" (1991)

Music video
- "Auberge (Official Music Video)" on YouTube

"Auberge" is a song by British singer-songwriter Chris Rea, released on 4 February 1991 by East West Records as the lead single from his eleventh studio album, Auberge (1991). It was written by Rea and produced by Jon Kelly. "Auberge" reached No. 16 in the United Kingdom and remained on the UK Singles Chart for six weeks. A music video was filmed to promote the single. It was directed by Nigel Dick and shot at Bray Studios, Berkshire.

== Critical reception ==
Upon release, Music & Media wrote, "Rea at his best: the perfect combination of Dire Straits-framed vocals and Ry Cooder-styled slide guitar. The type of song to play loud during driving. Traffic will be much nicer the next weeks." Andy Stout of Sounds described the song as "good, honest rock à la Bob 'Excitement' Harris".

In the US, Billboard magazine described the song as a "dreamy blues-induced rocker", with "dark, Morrison-esque vocal delivery, "rockabilly guitar backdrop", "psychedelic organ vibes" and "lighthearted horn riffs". In a review of the album of the same name, Johnny Loftus of AllMusic wrote, "The rousing title track and its accompanying set piece "Set Me Free" move from searching, tentative guitar noodlings into full-blown epics, with bluesy bottom end, blustering horns, backup singers, and Rea's own grainy vocal rumble."

== Track listings ==
- 7-inch and cassette single

A. "Auberge"
B. "Hudson's Dream"

- 12-inch single

A1. "Auberge (In Its Entirety)"
B1. "Hudson's Dream"
B2. "Every Second Counts"

- CD single
1. "Auberge"
2. "Let's Dance" (7-inch version)
3. "On the Beach" (7-inch version)
4. "The Road to Hell (Part II)"

== Personnel ==
- Chris Rea – guitar, slide guitar, Hammond organ
- Max Middleton – piano
- Robert Ahwai – bass
- Martin Ditcham – drums, percussion
- Carol Kenyon – backing vocals
- Linda Taylor – backing vocals

Production

- Jon Kelly – producer
- Justin Shirley-Smith – engineer
- Russell Shaw – assistant engineer

Other

- Alan Fearnley – illustration

== Charts ==
=== Weekly charts ===
Chart (1991)	Peak position
Australia (ARIA)	101
Austria (Ö3 Austria Top 40)	29
Belgium (Ultratop 50 Flanders)	31
Canada Top Singles (RPM)	86
Canada Adult Contemporary (RPM)	34
Europe (Eurochart Hot 100)	37
Europe (European Hit Radio)	1
France (SNEP)	46
Germany (GfK)	20
Ireland (IRMA)	8
Netherlands (Single Top 100)	45
UK Singles (Official Charts)	16
UK Airplay (Music Week)	4

=== Year-end charts ===
Chart (1991)	Position
Europe (European Hit Radio)	26
Germany (Media Control)	65

== Release history ==
Region	Date	Format(s)	Label(s)	Ref.
United Kingdom	4 February 1991	7-inch vinyl; 12-inch vinyl; CD; cassette	EastWest	
Australia	4 March 1991	7-inch vinyl; 12-inch vinyl; CD; cassette	EastWest	
Japan	25 July 1991	CD	EastWest	
