= Stainsby Girls =

Single by Chris Rea

from the album Shamrock Diaries
- B-side: "And When She Smiles"
- Released: 8 March 1985
- Length: 3:50
- Label: Magnet
- Songwriter: Chris Rea
- Producers: Chris Rea; Dave Richards

Chris Rea singles chronology
"Ace of Hearts" (1984)	"Stainsby Girls" (1985)	"Josephine" (1985)

Music video
- "Stainsby Girls (Official Music Video)" on YouTube

"Stainsby Girls" is a song by British singer-songwriter Chris Rea, released on 8 March 1985 as the lead single from his seventh studio album, Shamrock Diaries. It was written by Rea, and produced by Rea and Dave Richards. "Stainsby Girls" reached No. 26 in the UK and remained in the charts for twelve weeks.

"Stainsby Girls" was written by Rea as a tribute for his wife Joan, a former student of the Stainsby Secondary Modern School. The single's B-side, "And When She Smiles", is listed on the back sleeve as having been "recorded on eight track on a yacht in Ibiza harbour". Rea later re-recorded "Stainsby Girls" for his 1988 album New Light Through Old Windows.

== Critical reception ==
In a retrospective review of Shamrock Diaries, Sharon Mawer of AllMusic described the song as "easily the most like Bruce Springsteen that Rea had ever sounded". Colin Larkin, in his book The Encyclopedia of Popular Music, noted the song was a "slice of nostalgia for the northern England of Rea's adolescence".

== Track listing ==
7" single

1. "Stainsby Girls" – 3:50
2. "And When She Smiles" – 3:12

12" single (German release)

1. "Stainsby Girls (Sax-Mix)" – 4:20
2. "September Blue" – 3:54

== Personnel ==
- Chris Rea - vocals, guitar, producer
- Eoghan O'Neill - bass
- Mel Collins - saxophone
- Dave Mattacks - drums
- Dave Richards - producer, engineer
- Barry Hammond - engineer

== Charts ==
Chart (1985)	Peak position
Belgian Singles Chart (V)	33
Irish Singles Chart	10
UK Singles Chart	26
