= Fool (If You Think It's Over) =

1978 single by Chris Rea

Single by Chris Rea

from the album Whatever Happened to Benny Santini?
- B-side: "Midnight Love"
- Released: 24 March 1978
- Recorded: 1977
- Studio: The Mill
- Genre: Soft rock
- Length: 3:39 (single version); 4:47 (album version)
- Label: Magnet (UK); United Artists (US)
- Songwriter: Chris Rea
- Producer: Gus Dudgeon

Chris Rea singles chronology
"So Much Love" (1974)	"Fool (If You Think It's Over)" (1978)	"Whatever Happened to Benny Santini?" (1978)

Music video
- "Fool (If You Think It's Over)" on YouTube

"Fool (If You Think It's Over)"

Single by Chris Rea

from the album New Light Through Old Windows
- B-side: "Loving You Again (live)"
- Released: October 1988
- Recorded: 1988
- Genre: Pop rock, soft rock
- Length: 4:03
- Label: Magnet
- Songwriter: Chris Rea
- Producers: Chris Rea, Jon Kelly

Chris Rea Dutch singles chronology
"On The Beach (Summer '88)" (1988)	"Fool (If You Think It's Over)" (1988)	"Driving Home for Christmas - The Christmas EP" (1988)

Audio
- "Fool (If You Think It's Over)" on YouTube

"Fool (If You Think It's Over)" (also written as "Fool If You Think It's Over") is a song written and originally released in 1978 by the English singer-songwriter Chris Rea. It appears on his debut album, Whatever Happened to Benny Santini?, and peaked at number 12 in the US, becoming his highest charting single there. The single's charting success in the US earned him a Grammy nomination as Best New Artist in 1979.

== Background ==
"Fool (If You Think It's Over)" was the lead single from Rea's debut album Whatever Happened to Benny Santini? which was recorded at producer Gus Dudgeon's Thames Valley recording studio The Mill. The song's inspiration was the experience Rea's younger sister Paula had encountered some years previously of being devastated at losing her first boyfriend.

Rea wrote "Fool" intending that it be recorded by Al Green. He intended it to be a Memphis blues song, but according to Rea, "It ended up being this huge California thing. It’s the only track I never played guitar on which tells you something about the spirit of it. On top of that, it was just a huge hit. So there was nothing I could do. It was like: 'This is not me!'" Rea played keyboards on "Fool" with the track's background vocals provided by Rea and the Mill's assistant engineer Stuart Epps.

The song, written in the key of G major, uses the ii–V–I turnaround, common in jazz and R&B.

Unsuccessful in its initial UK single release in March 1978, "Fool" was afforded a June 1978 release in the US where it entered the Top 40 of the Hot 100 singles chart in Billboard magazine in July 1978 to reach a No .12 peak on the Hot 100 dated 16 September 1978, then being in the second week of a three-week tenure at No. 1 on the Billboard Easy Listening chart. On the strength of its US success Rea was invited to perform "Fool" on the 28 September 1978 Top of the Pops broadcast which facilitated a belated UK singles chart run with a 28 October 1978 peak of No. 30.

Rea recalled, during the 1978 Yuletide overnight drive home from London, considering abandoning what he saw as his failing singing career to fall back on his family's established business of running a restaurant. However, when Rea and his wife Joan reached their Middlesbrough home in the early morning "we opened the door of the house we were just about to lose the mortgage on, and the snow fell into the hall and it didn’t melt – it was that cold – and there was one letter on the floor." The letter was accompanied by a substantial royalty cheque generated by "Fool", enabling Rea to buy a Ferrari 308 GT4. The journey inspired his later hit "Driving Home for Christmas".

Rea would remake "Fool (If You Think It's Over)" for his 1988 self-produced album New Light Through Old Windows. This version of "Fool" had a Dutch single release charting at No. 90. In 2007, Rea would again remake "Fool" in a session at The Mill – now known as Sol Studios – where the original had been recorded. Rea produced and played all instruments on the track, which was included on his 2008 European CD release Fool If You Think It's Over (The Definitive Greatest Hits).

The music journalist Wayne Jacik mentioned the single in his work Billboard Book of One-Hit Wonders.

== Personnel ==
- Chris Rea: Vocals, acoustic piano
- Pete Wingfield: Electric piano
- Paul Keogh: Electric guitar
- Dave Markee: Bass
- Dave Mattacks: Drums
- Frank Ricotti: Congas, vibraphone, temple blocks and cabasa
- Dave Gregory: Sopranino saxophone
- Orchestra arranged and conducted by Richard Hewson

== Chart performance ==
Chart performance for "Fool (If You Think It's Over)" by Chris Rea
Weekly charts (1978 if not otherwise indicated)						Year-end charts (1978)		
Regional chart		Peak	Regional chart		Peak	Regional chart		Yr.-end
Australia		39	New Zealand		31	Australia		—
Canada	RPM Top Singles	15	UK		30	Canada		101
Canada	RPM Adult; Oriented Playlist	1	US	Billboard; Hot 100	12	US	Billboard; Hot 100	84
France		52	US	Billboard; Hot 100	12	US	Billboard; Hot 100	84
Nether- lands	Dutch Top 40	25	US	Cash Box; Top 100	10	US	Cash Box; Top 100	86
Nether- lands	Single Top 100 ('88 remake) 1988	90	US	Billboard; Easy Listening	1	US	Billboard; Easy Listening	7

== Covers ==
=== Elkie Brooks version ===
"Fool If You Think It's Over"

Single by Elkie Brooks

from the album Pearls
- B-side: "Givin' It Up for Your Love"
- Released: December 1981
- Recorded: 1980
- Studio: The Mill
- Genre: Pop rock, soft rock
- Length: 3:55 (single version); 4:58 (album version)
- Label: A&M
- Songwriter: Chris Rea
- Producer: Gus Dudgeon

Elkie Brooks singles chronology
"Warm & Tender Lover" (1981)	"Fool If You Think It's Over" (1981)	"Our Love" (1982)

Music video
- "Fool If You Think It's Over" on YouTube

In 1982 Elkie Brooks had a Top 20 hit in the UK and South Africa and Ireland with her remake, titled "Fool If You Think It's Over", which like the Chris Rea original was produced by Gus Dudgeon and recorded at the Mill. Brooks' version was one of eight tracks recorded with Dudgeon in 1980 for her 1981 twelve-track album release Pearls, which also includes four of Brooks' previous hit singles. Brooks said, "Most of [Pearl's new] material had been chosen by [A&M exec] Derek Green or Gus Dudgeon. I had insisted that we did [sic] 'Fool'. Chris Rea has always been one of my favourite musicians and writers and I thought the song was pure class."

Brooks' version of "Fool" was issued as a single in December 1981 when Pearls, issued the previous month, was in the Top Ten of the UK album chart. Three advance singles had been issued off the album since July 1980 without charting. "Fool" rose to a number 17 peak on the UK chart dated 27 February 1982, assisted by two Top of the Pops performances by Brooks, one of which was re-run. After taping her 11 February 1982 TOTP performance of "Fool", Brooks was approached backstage by a fan, who Brooks soon realised was in fact Chris Rea incognito, asking for her autograph. In Ireland, "Fool" became Brooks' highest-charting single with a number six chart peak.

In a 2014 pre-concert interview Brooks, when asked what "big numbers" she looked forward to singing, replied: "I still really like 'Don't Cry Out Loud', 'Sunshine After the Rain' and of course 'Fool If You Think It's Over': that is a terrific song."

"Fool If You Think It's Over" by Elkie Brooks was the first track played on Radio Caroline when the station resumed broadcasting at 10 a.m. on 20 August 1983, after a down period of 41 months.

=== Chart history ===
Chart performance for "Fool If You Think It's Over" by Elkie Brooks
Chart (1982)	Peak position
Ireland (IRMA)	6
South Africa (Springbok Radio)	18
UK Singles (OCC)	17

=== Other versions ===
Thomas Anders remade "Fool (If You Think It's Over)" for his 1989 album release Different. This version was the third produced by Gus Dudgeon. The song served as the theme to the 1990s British sitcom Joking Apart. Kenny Craddock arranged and performed this version.

== See also ==
- List of number-one adult contemporary singles of 1978 (U.S.)
