= Texas (Chris Rea song) =

Single by Chris Rea

from the album The Road to Hell
- B-side: "Let's Dance (Live)"
- Released: 23 April 1990
- Length: 5:09
- Label: East West
- Songwriter: Chris Rea
- Producers: Chris Rea; Jon Kelly

Chris Rea singles chronology
"Tell Me There's a Heaven" (1990)	"Texas" (1990)	"Auberge" (1991)

Music video
- "Texas (Official Video)" on YouTube

"Texas" is a song by British singer-songwriter Chris Rea, released on 23 April 1990 as an extended play from his tenth studio album, The Road to Hell (1989). It was written by Rea and produced by Rea and Jon Kelly. "Texas" reached No. 69 in the UK Singles Chart and remained in the Top 100 for two weeks.

"Texas" was the second song of the same name that Rea had recorded. The first was an entirely different song, released on his 1983 album Water Sign.

== Background ==
"Texas" was inspired by a conversation Rea had with his neighbour about Texas. At the time, Rea had not been to the state, whereas his neighbour described the long, clear roads and lack of traffic jams there. In the 1999 Collins Gem book Classic Albums, Rea said of the song's character: "He's going for that big Western apple in the sky. He's thinking it should be like Texas, and he's thinking of large, cheap steaks, every woman is 6' 4" and has massive legs and looks like Jerry Hall, [and] there's no trouble because they say there's no trouble. But really, if you've been there, it's even three times more violent."

== Music video ==
A music video was filmed to promote the single. Rea recalled to Peter Doggett in 2019: "We had great fun making the video for that, because we went to the American army camp in Berlin for three days."

== Critical reception ==
On its release, Music & Media wrote: "Well-crafted pop rock that starts off mellow and sparse, but gains more substance along the way. Particularly good slide guitar." In a review of The Road to Hell, David Law of The Charlatan described the song as "nicely loose" and containing a "certain optimism". He wrote: "The song celebrates the existence of a place still big enough to hold the dreamers. There's appealing slide work on the track, with a guitar sound as big as the state itself." In a retrospective review, John Floyd of AllMusic noted "Texas" as being one of a number of tracks on The Road to Hell which "pick apart the atrocities of our society".

== Track listing ==
7" single

1. "Texas" – 5:09
2. "Let's Dance" (Live) – 7:36

12" single

1. "Texas" – 5:09
2. "The Road to Hell (Part 1 & 2)" (Live) – 7:02
3. "Let's Dance" (Live) – 7:36

CD single

1. "Texas" – 5:09
2. "Working on It" (Live) – 6:35
3. "Let's Dance" (Live) – 7:36

CD single (US promo)

1. "Texas" (Remix) – 4:35
2. "Texas" (LP Version) – 5:09
3. "Working on It" (Live - Special Bonus Track) – 6:31

== Personnel ==
Texas

- Chris Rea - vocals, guitars, keyboards
- Max Middleton - keyboards
- Robert Ahwai - bass
- Martin Ditcham - drums, percussion

Production

- Chris Rea, Jon Kelly - producers
- Neil Amor, Diane BJ Koné - engineers on "Texas"
- Justin Shirley-Smith, Paul Lilly - mixing on live tracks

Other

- The Leisure Process - sleeve design, art direction

== Charts ==
Chart (1990)	Peak position
UK Singles Chart	69
