= Tell Me There's a Heaven =

Single by Chris Rea

from the album The Road to Hell
- B-side: "And When She Smiles"
- Released: 29 January 1990
- Length: 6:01
- Label: East West
- Songwriter: Chris Rea
- Producers: Chris Rea, Jon Kelly

Chris Rea singles chronology
"That's What They Always Say" (1989)	"Tell Me There's a Heaven" (1990)	"Texas" (1990)

Music video
- "Tell Me There's a Heaven (2019 Remaster)" on YouTube

"Tell Me There's a Heaven" is a song by British singer-songwriter Chris Rea, released on 29 January 1990 as the third single from his tenth studio album, The Road to Hell (1989). It was written by Rea and produced by Rea and Jon Kelly. "Tell Me There's a Heaven" reached No. 24 in the UK Singles Chart and remained in the Top 100 for six weeks.

In 1994, the single was re-issued from Rea's compilation album The Best of Chris Rea. It re-charted at No. 70 in the UK in December 1994. Another re-issue in 2000 saw the song peak at No. 11 on the Ö3 Austria Top 40 chart.

== Background ==
Rea was inspired to write "Tell Me There's a Heaven" after his daughter Josie saw footage of a riot in South Africa on the news, which showed "this horrible thing of throwing lighted tyres over people" (necklacing) and "one guy burning to death". Rea recalled to Peter Doggett in 2019: "Joan's [Rea's wife] dad was saying he didn't know what to say to Josie about what she'd seen, so he just said, 'That man has gone to heaven'. And that's how songs happen. I went up to see her and she was safely asleep, so I looked out the window and said to myself, 'Grandad told you there's a heaven, I'd like someone to tell me there's a heaven, too.'"

In 1992, the song, with references to child abuse in its lyrics, was used as the soundtrack to a PIF for the NSPCC, juxtaposed with excuses made by child abusers and descriptions of injuries from coroner reports, indicating that some children had died.

== Critical reception ==
On its release, Music & Media wrote, "A slow, gentle and intimate song with some tastefully arranged strings. Perfect for late-night and AC programmers." Eleanor Levy of Record Mirror wrote, "A simple piano backing erupts into a full blown orchestral arrangement as Rea uses a four minute pop song to try to come to terms with the serious subject of child abuse." She considered the song to be "sincere" and one that avoided being "over-sentimental" and "schmaltzy", but questioned the suitability of releasing a song "so obviously written to be heard within the context of an album" as a single.

In a review of The Road to Hell, David Law of The Charlatan felt the song "sums up both Rea's disillusionment and his hopes for the future", but felt it would have been "more effective shrouded in simple acoustic guitar and piano" than the "John Williams-type soundtrack strings". Deborah Hornblow of the Hartford Courant described the song as a "good track" which "begs questions a child would ask on seeing the world's unkindness". John Everson of the Southtown Star considered the song to be "astounding in emotion and lyrical sweep".

== Track listing ==
=== Original release ===
7" single

1. "Tell Me There's a Heaven" – 6:01
2. "And When She Smiles" – 3:11

12" single

1. "Tell Me There's a Heaven" – 6:01
2. "And When She Smiles" – 3:11
3. "Curse of the Traveller" – 6:25

CD single

1. "Tell Me There's a Heaven" – 6:01
2. "And When She Smiles" – 3:11
3. "Curse of the Traveller" – 6:25
4. "Little Blonde Plaits" – 4:16

=== 1994 release ===
CD single

1. "Tell Me There's a Heaven" – 6:01
2. "Stainsby Girls" – 4:06
3. "Let's Dance" – 4:15

CD single (promo release)

1. "Tell Me There's a Heaven" (Edit) – 4:55
2. "Tell Me There's a Heaven" (Album Version) – 6:01
3. "Stainsby Girls" – 4:06
4. "Let's Dance" – 4:15
5. "Driving Home for Christmas" – 3:58

=== 2000 release ===
CD single

1. "Tell Me There's a Heaven" – 6:01
2. "Sail Away" – 4:48
3. "Sandwriting" – 5:08

== Personnel ==
Tell Me There's a Heaven

- Chris Rea - vocals, guitars, keyboards
- Max Middleton - keyboards, string arrangement
- Robert Ahwai - bass
- Martin Ditcham - drums, percussion

Production

- Chris Rea - producer of "Tell Me There's a Heaven" and "And When She Smile", producer and mixing on "Curse of the Traveller", producer of "Little Blonde Plaits"
- Jon Kelly - producer of "Tell Me There's a Heaven", mixing on "Curse of the Traveller"
- Dave Richards - producer of "And When She Smiles" and "Little Blonde Plaits"
- Neil Amor, Diane BJ Koné - engineers on "Tell Me There's a Heaven"

Other

- The Leisure Process - sleeve design
- Christian Charisius - back cover photography

== Charts ==
Chart (1990)	Peak position
Irish Singles Chart	20
UK Singles Chart	24

Chart (1994)	Peak position
UK Singles Chart	70

Chart (2000)	Peak position
Austrian Singles Chart	11
