= Joys of Christmas =

Single by Chris Rea

from the album Dancing with Strangers
- B-side: "Driving Home for Christmas"
- Released: 23 November 1987
- Length: 5:04
- Label: Magnet
- Songwriter: Chris Rea
- Producer: Chris Rea

Chris Rea singles chronology
"Loving You Again" (1987)	"Joys of Christmas" (1987)	"Que Sera" (1988)

"Joys of Christmas" is a song by British singer-songwriter Chris Rea, released on 23 November 1987 as the third single from his ninth studio album, Dancing with Strangers. The song was written and produced by Rea. "Joys of Christmas" reached No. 67 in the UK Singles Chart and remained in the Top 100 for two weeks.

== Background ==
"Joys of Christmas" was inspired by Rea's own experiences of growing up as a child in Middlesbrough. Rea recalled for the liner notes of the 2019 re-issue of Dancing with Strangers,

"This song was the Christmas I knew when I was young. My dad had a coffee bar [which] was over the road from where you used to get your dole money, next to a working men's club and the labour exchange. And all of that used to descend on me in the afternoon, in my nylon white coat, which had this funny little man in a chef's uniform, and the words 'Mr Really Good', with the R-E-A in red, and the rest in blue. I was just a sitting target. Sometimes I had to go to hospital on the way home, to get something stitched. It was like that all the time."

The single's B-side is the first version of "Driving Home for Christmas" that Rea recorded. The song was re-recorded for New Light Through Old Windows in 1988 and released as a single in its own right.

== Critical reception ==
On its release as a single, Danny Baker of New Musical Express questioned "Joys of Christmas" as an A-side and felt that the "wee low-key gift tucked away on the B-side", "Driving Home for Christmas", was "the real winner". He added, "'Joys of Christmas' isn't even a seasonally recorded deal. It says here that it's from his last LP. How very odd." In a review of Dancing with Strangers, Robin Denselow of The Guardian described "Joys of Christmas" as a "bleak view of life in the North" and noted the song's "melodic bluesy feel" and "spoken pieces". Helen Metella of the Edmonton Journal commented that the song "juxtaposes a modern hymn against the snapshots of out-of-work youth in north England". James Muretich of the Calgary Herald felt Rea had "penned a classic" with "Joys of Christmas" and noted its "cutting, Claptonish guitar licks" and "tales of hardship amid the season of supposed joy".

== Track listing ==
7-inch single

1. "Joys of Christmas" – 5:04
2. "Driving Home for Christmas" – 4:34

12-inch single

1. "Joys of Christmas" – 5:04
2. "Driving Home for Christmas" – 4:34
3. "Hello Friend" (re-record) – 4:20

CD single

1. "Joys of Christmas" – 5:04
2. "Yes I Do" – 3:21
3. "Driving Home for Christmas" – 4:34
4. "Hello Friend" (re-record) – 4:20

== Personnel ==
Credits are adapted from the UK CD single liner notes and the Dancing with Strangers booklet.

Joys of Christmas

- Chris Rea - guitar, accordion, brass, harmonica, vocals
- Eoghan O'Neill - bass
- Martin Ditcham - drums, percussion

Production

- Chris Rea - producer (all tracks), mixing on "Joys of Christmas" and "Yes I Do"
- Jon Kelly - mixing on "Joys of Christmas" and "Yes I Do"
- Stuart Eales - producer on "Driving Home for Christmas" and "Hello Friend", engineer on "Joys of Christmas"

Other

- Anne Magill - illustration
- The Leisure Process - design

== Charts ==
Chart (1987)	Peak position
UK Singles (OCC)	67
