= Chris Rea (album) =

Studio album by Chris Rea
- Released: 5 March 1982
- Recorded: August – December 1981
- Studio: Air Studios, Abbey Road Studios and Odyssey Studios (London, UK); Chipping Norton Recording Studios (Oxfordshire, UK); Bray Studios (Berkshire, UK)
- Genre: Soft rock
- Length: 42:46
- Label: Magnet
- Producer: Jon Kelly; Chris Rea

Chris Rea chronology
Tennis (1980)	Chris Rea (1982)	Water Sign (1983)

Professional ratings
Review scores
Source	Rating
AllMusic	3/5 stars

Chris Rea is the fourth studio album by the British singer-songwriter of the same name, released in March 1982. It charted on the UK Albums Chart, peaking at number fifty-two. The single "Loving You" peaked at number 65 on the UK Singles Chart, and charted on the US Billboard Hot 100 at number 88, remaining on that chart for three weeks.

Rea would later re-use a verse from "When You Know Your Love Has Died" for his single "Que Sera" taken from his 1987 album Dancing with Strangers.

== Track listing ==
All songs written by Chris Rea

1. "Loving You" – 3:47
2. "If You Choose to Go" – 4:11
3. "Guitar Street" – 3:58
4. "Do You Still Dream?" – 4:00
5. "Every Beat of My Heart" – 3:18
6. "Goodbye Little Columbus" – 4:15
7. "One Sweet Tender Touch" – 3:50
8. "Do It for Your Love" – 3:45
9. "Just Want to Be with You" – 4:00
10. "Runaway" – 3:32
11. "When You Know Your Love Has Died" – 4:10

("Just Want to Be with You" is the entirely different song, than the better known 1989 song "I Just Wanna Be with You" from The Road to Hell.)

== Singles ==
- "Loving You" b/w "Let Me Be the One"
- "Every Beat of My Heart" b/w "One Sweet Tender Touch"

== Personnel ==
=== Musicians ===
- Chris Rea – vocals, acoustic piano (1), Fender Rhodes (1, 8), slide guitar (1–4, 10, 11), guitars (2–11), organ (3, 11), keyboards (6), mandolin (6), accordion (9), dobro (9)
- Max Middleton – keyboards (4), acoustic piano (8)
- Pete Wingfield – keyboards (6), organ (11)
- Mike Moran – acoustic piano (7)
- David Skinner – acoustic piano (10, 11), backing vocals (10)
- Jim Mullen – guitars (1)
- Alan Murphy – lead guitar (4), rhythm guitars (9, 10)
- Martin Kershaw – guitars (5)
- Simon Nicol – rhythm guitars (9), acoustic guitars (10)
- Bruce Lynch – bass guitar (1)
- David Paton – bass guitar (2–4, 6, 8–11), backing vocals (10)
- Steve Lawrence – string bass (5)
- Dave Mattacks – drums (1–4, 7, 8)
- Stuart Elliott – drums (3, 9–11)
- Ray Cooper – percussion (2), tambourine (9)
- Skaila Kanga – harp (5)
- David Snell – harp (5)
- Ron Asprey – saxophone (6, 9)
- The Montmazoomi Sisters – saxophones (9)
- Andrew Powell – string arrangements and conductor (5, 9), bass guitar (7)
- Carol Kenyon – backing vocals (1, 8, 11)
- Katie Kissoon – backing vocals (1, 8, 11)
- Linda Taylor – backing vocals (1, 8, 11)
- Burleigh Drummond – backing vocals (7)
- David Pack – backing vocals (7)
- Joe Puerta – backing vocals (7)

=== Production ===
- Chris Rea – producer
- Jon Kelly – producer, engineer
- Renate Blauel – assistant engineer
- Tony Richards – assistant engineer
- Brian Palmer – artwork
- Masaru Kawahara – cover design
- Andrew Douglas – photography

== Charts ==
Chart performance for Chris Rea
Chart (1982)	Peak position
UK Albums (OCC)	52
