= Water Sign (Chris Rea album) =

Studio album by Chris Rea
- Released: March 1983
- Recorded: August – December 1982
- Genre: Rock
- Length: 40:24
- Label: Magnet
- Producers: Chris Rea; David Richards

Chris Rea chronology
Chris Rea (1981)	Water Sign (1983)	Wired to the Moon (1984)

Singles from Water Sign
- 1. "I Can Hear Your Heartbeat" Released: April 1983

Professional ratings
Review scores
Source	Rating
AllMusic	3.5/5 stars

Water Sign is the fifth studio album by British singer-songwriter Chris Rea, released in March 1983. The album reached No. 64 on the UK Albums Chart. "I Can Hear Your Heartbeat" was released as a single, initially peaking on the UK Singles Chart at No. 60, while a re-recorded version for Rea's 1988 compilation album, New Light Through Old Windows, reached No. 74. The album contained three singles which includes several non-album B-sides. Water Sign reached No. 36 in New Zealand. It sold well in Ireland, prompting Rea to mount an extensive tour there, which marked the beginning of an upswing in the musician's fortunes.

== Production and impact ==
According to the sleeve notes in the 2019 deluxe version of Shamrock Diaries, the record company would not fund Water Sign, "forcing [Rea] to use tracks that had been intended as demos". As a result, Rea plays most instruments on the album, and – unusually – drum machines feature. In an interview for Q magazine, Rea told Paul Du Noyer, "I turned in the Water Sign tapes as demos. And they said, that's it, put them out. And it looked like once they'd released that album they were gonna drop us." In a fresh interview for the Shamrock Diaries sleeve notes, Rea recounts how – at that time – he was ready to throw in the towel, quit the music business and open an Italian restaurant. "Then a guy from Ireland phoned Magnet Records and said, 'I really like Water Sign. Will Chris come over and do a concert?'", which was the beginning of a change in his fortunes. "Then it all started to come good in Ireland," he said. "I went over there, it was like Beatlemania! So I stayed there a while, did a large tour."

The founder of the Montreux Jazz Festival, Claude Nobs, plays harmonica on the opening track, which is his only appearance on a studio album.

== Track listing ==
All tracks written by Chris Rea.

1. "Nothing's Happening by the Sea" – 4:18
2. "Deep Water" – 4:06
3. "Candles" – 4:40
4. "Love's Strange Ways" – 3:38
5. "Texas" – 3:58
6. "Let It Loose" – 3:35
7. "I Can Hear Your Heartbeat" – 3:28
8. "Midnight Blue" – 4:50
9. "Hey You" – 4:00
10. "Out of the Darkness" – 3:27

("Texas" is the 1983 song, which entirely differs from the better known 1989 song of the same name from The Road to Hell.)

== Personnel ==
=== Musicians ===
- Chris Rea – vocals, all other instruments (1, 5–7, 10), all instruments (3, 4, 8, 9), guitars (2), keyboards (2)
- Ian Hawkins – guitars (2, 7, 10), bass (2, 7, 10)
- Claude Nobs – harmonica solo (1)
- Kevin Leach – saxophone solo (2, 10), acoustic piano (7)
- David Richards – horns (5), sequencing (6), additional drums (10), additional percussion (10)

=== Production ===
- Chris Rea – producer
- David Richards – producer, engineer
- Shoot That Tiger! – design
- Daniel Kleinman – hand tinting
- Fin Costello – photography

== Singles ==
1. "Let It Loose" b/w "Sierra Sierra", "Urban Samurai"
2. "I Can Hear Your Heartbeat" b/w "From Love to Love"
3. "Love's Strange Ways" b/w "Smile"

== Charts ==
Chart performance for Water Sign
Chart (1983)	Peak position
Australian Albums (Kent Music Report)	60
Dutch Albums (Album Top 100)	33
German Albums (Offizielle Top 100)	30
New Zealand Albums (RMNZ)	36
Swedish Albums (Sverigetopplistan)	7
UK Albums (Official Charts)	64
