= Josephine (Chris Rea song) =

Single by Chris Rea

from the album Shamrock Diaries
- Released: 22 June 1985
- Recorded: December 1984
- Genre: Soft rock
- Length: 4:26 (album); 3:35 ('85 single)
- Label: Magnet
- Songwriter: Chris Rea
- Producers: Chris Rea, David Richards, Jon Kelly

Chris Rea singles chronology
"Stainsby Girls" (1985)	"Josephine" (1985)	"All Summer Long" (1985)

Music video
- "Josephine (Official Music Video)" on YouTube

"Josephine" is a song by British singer-songwriter Chris Rea, released on 22 June 1985 as the second single from the album Shamrock Diaries. The song performed strongly, reaching the top 10 in France and the Netherlands, and a remix enjoyed popularity on the Balearic beat scene. There exist at least eight versions of the song. It was written for his daughter of the same name. Rea would later name a song after his youngest daughter, Julia, on the album Espresso Logic (1993).

== Composition ==
Rea considered "Josephine" to be a blues song, saying that the "rhythm track... is supposed to be the Yellowjackets, Weather Report, and it grooves like hell, to me". However, the record company asked for changes leading to different versions of the song. Rea says that, "When I'm on stage, I kind of shut my eyes when I'm singing and I'm always where I wrote the song. With "Josephine"... I'm always on the third floor of the Intercontinental Hotel in Düsseldorf in Germany and it's raining. That's where I am when I sing that song, every time." After an encounter with a record executive in Paris, who liked the disco chords of the song, Rea recorded a demo club version which found its way to DJ Paul Oakenfold, who helped establish it on the acid house scene, ultimately prompting Magnet to issue it as a single, titled "Josephine (La Version Française)".

== Different versions ==
Rea has re-recorded the track many times, and it exists in 8 distinct versions:

- The original 1985 album version, which can be found on original vinyl and CD releases of Shamrock Diaries; length 4:26.
- Another original 1985 version with a slower tempo, an acoustic intro & a piano outro, length 5:36.
- The 1985 single version, a completely different, more rocking recording; length 3:35. This was later included on the 2001 compilation The Very Best of Chris Rea. The promotional video for the single uses a slightly extended version of this, which is approximately twenty seconds longer at the start.
- The more disco-sounding "Josephine (La Version Française)" a.k.a. "Josephine Extended French re-record", an extended remix created for a European non-album single release in 1987; length 5:39.
- An edited version of "La Version Française" that appears on reissues of Shamrock Diaries in place of the original; length 3:56.
- The 1988 re-recording created for the compilation New Light Through Old Windows; length 4:34. Possibly the most well-known version of the song, it has appeared on numerous Chris Rea compilations since.
- An alternate, faster 1988 re-recording found only on US editions of New Light Through Old Windows published by Geffen Records, but not those published by ATCO Records; length 4:17.
- A stripped-back 2008 re-recording included on the Germany-only compilation Fool If You Think It's Over - The Definitive Greatest Hits; length 3:58.

Most of the above versions were eventually collected across the two-disc reissues of Rea's albums Shamrock Diaries, Dancing with Strangers, The Road to Hell and Auberge that were released in 2019; only the 2008 re-recording and the edited version of "La Version Française" were omitted. The 2019 deluxe version of Shamrock Diaries restored the original 4:26 album version to the first disc, and includes the original 3:35 single version on the bonus disc.

The track was overdubbed with an orchestra for the Rhino compilation album 80's Symphonic in 2018.

== Track listing ==
Vinyl 12' (1985)
No.	Title	Length
1.	"Josephine"	3:55
2.	"Dancing Shoes"	3:37
3.	"Everytime It Rains"	3:58

Vinyl 7' (1985)
No.	Title	Length
1.	"Josephine"	3:55
2.	"Dancing Shoes"	3:37

== Charts ==
=== Weekly charts ===
Chart (1985)	Peak position
Belgium (Ultratop 50 Flanders)	13
France (SNEP)	7
Ireland (IRMA)	23
Netherlands (Dutch Top 40)	3
Netherlands (Single Top 100)	8
UK Singles (Official Charts)	67
West Germany (GfK)	31

=== Year-end charts ===
Chart (1985)	Position
Belgium (Ultratop Flanders)	73
Netherlands (Dutch Top 40)	25
Netherlands (Single Top 100)	41

== Sampling ==
The song was sampled by French house group Superfunk on their 2000 single "Lucky Star" (from the album Hold Up).
