= The Road to Hell (song) =

1989 single by Chris Rea

Single by Chris Rea

from the album The Road to Hell
- A-side: "The Road to Hell (Part 2)"
- B-side: "He Should Know Better"; "Josephine (La Version Française)"
- Released: 2 October 1989
- Length: Part 1: 4:52; Part 2: 4:32
- Label: Magnet
- Songwriter: Chris Rea
- Producer: Jon Kelly

Chris Rea singles chronology
"Working on It" (1989)	"The Road to Hell" (1989)	"That's What They Always Say" (1989)

Music video
- "The Road to Hell Pt 2 (Official Music Video)" on YouTube

"The Road to Hell" is a two-part song written by the English singer-songwriter Chris Rea and released on the album of the same name. It was released as a single, with only part 2 on the A-side of the 7-inch. The single is Rea's joint highest-charting single in the United Kingdom, peaking at number 10 on the UK Singles Chart.

== Background ==
The song was inspired by the frustrations of M25 and M4 motorway rush-hour traffic. “The Road to Hell” largely follows a lone protagonist undergoing self-discovery while marooned on a highway, introduced in the opening audio, though it is often suggested it could instead be the A19, heading north towards Sunderland near Rea’s native Middlesbrough.

The phrase "road to hell" was used by Rea in the song "I Can't Dance to That" from the 1987 album Dancing with Strangers.

== Reception ==
William Shaw of Smash Hits left an ironic review on the single and considered it remarkable "for being irredeemably depressing" and "sounding exactly like an old Dire Straits song."

== Track listings ==
7-inch single Magnet YZ431

Side one
No.	Title	Length
1.	"The Road to Hell (Part 2)"	3:55

Side two
No.	Title	Length
1.	"He Should Know Better"	4:35

12-inch single Magnet YZ431T

Side one
No.	Title	Length
1.	"The Road to Hell (Parts 1 & 2)"	9:20

Side two
No.	Title	Length
1.	"Josephine (La Version Française)"	5:37

CD single Magnet YZ431CD (3-inch) and YZ431CDP (5-inch)

No.	Title	Length
1.	"The Road to Hell (Parts 1 & 2)"	9:20
2.	"Josephine (La Version Française)"	5:37
3.	"He Should Know Better"	4:37

Cassette single Magnet YZ431C

Side one
No.	Title	Length
1.	"The Road to Hell (Part 2)"	4:35
2.	"He Should Know Better"	3:55

Side two
No.	Title	Length
1.	"The Road to Hell (Part 2)"	4:35
2.	"He Should Know Better"	3:55

== Charts ==
=== Weekly charts ===
Chart (1989-1990)	Peak position
Australia (ARIA)	78
Austria (Ö3 Austria Top 40)	6
Belgium (Ultratop 50 Flanders)	35
Canada Top Singles (RPM)	32
Europe (Eurochart Hot 100)	30
France (SNEP)	30
Ireland (IRMA)	11
Italy Airplay (Music & Media)	18
UK Singles (Official Charts)	10
US Mainstream Rock (Billboard)	11
West Germany (GfK)	35

Chart (2013)	Position
Slovenia (SloTop50)	44

Chart (2015)	Position
Poland Airplay (ZPAV)	100

Chart (2018)	Position
Slovenia (SloTop50)	49
