= New Light Through Old Windows =

Compilation album by Chris Rea
- Released: 17 October 1988
- Recorded: March–July 1988
- Studios: Mountain Studios (Montreux, Switzerland); Miraval Studios (Provence, France)
- Genre: Album-oriented rock
- Length: 60:15
- Labels: Geffen (US); Magnet (rest of world)
- Producers: Chris Rea; Jon Kelly

Chris Rea chronology
Dancing with Strangers (1987)	New Light Through Old Windows (1988)	The Road to Hell (1989)

Singles from New Light Through Old Windows
- 1. "Driving Home for Christmas" Released: November 1988

Music video
- "Working on it (1989)" on YouTube

Professional ratings
Review scores
Source	Rating
AllMusic	3/5 stars

New Light Through Old Windows is the first compilation album by British singer-songwriter Chris Rea, released in October 1988. The album consists primarily of re-recordings of songs from Rea's earlier albums, as well as the new track "Working on It", which peaked at No. 73 on the US Billboard Hot 100, and was Rea's only No. 1 on the Mainstream Rock Tracks chart. "On the Beach" peaked at No. 9 on the US Adult Contemporary singles chart, and No. 12 on the UK Singles Chart. The album reached number five on the UK Albums Chart, charted for over a year, and was certified 3× Platinum by BPI until 1992. It charted in the Top 10 in New Zealand, Austria and West Germany.

== Track listing ==
All tracks written by Chris Rea.

1. "Let's Dance" (from Dancing with Strangers) – 4:14
2. "Working on It" (previously unreleased) – 4:24
3. "Ace of Hearts" (from Wired to the Moon)– 4:52
4. "Josephine" (from Shamrock Diaries) – 4:33
5. "Candles" (from Water Sign) – 4:44
6. "On the Beach" (from On the Beach) – 6:51
7. "Fool (If You Think It's Over)" (from Whatever Happened to Benny Santini?) – 4:03
8. "I Can Hear Your Heartbeat" from Water Sign) – 3:23
9. "Shamrock Diaries" (from Shamrock Diaries) – 4:12
10. "Stainsby Girls" (from Shamrock Diaries) – 4:06
11. "Windy Town" (from Dancing with Strangers) – 4:05
12. "Driving Home for Christmas" (new version; original on New Light Through Old Windows) – 4:00
13. "Steel River" (from Shamrock Diaries) – 6:48

The US release featured different cover artwork and an altered track listing, shown below:

1. "Let's Dance" – 4:16
2. "Working on It" – 4:25
3. "I Can Hear Your Heartbeat" – 3:24
4. "Windy Town" – 4:06
5. "On the Beach" – 6:53
6. "Steel River" – 6:48
7. "Stainsby Girls" – 4:08
8. "Ace of Hearts" – 4:52
9. "Josephine" – 4:17 (different version than international release)
10. "Candles" – 4:42

== Personnel ==
- Chris Rea – vocals, keyboards, guitars
- Max Middleton – keyboards
- Robert Ahwai – guitars
- Eoghan O'Neill – bass
- Martin Ditcham – drums, percussion
- Steve Gregory – soprano saxophone
- Carol Kenyon – backing vocals
- Katie Kissoon – backing vocals

=== Production ===
- Chris Rea – producer
- Jon Kelly – producer
- Justin Shirley-Smith – engineer
- Ronald Bos – art direction
- Hotline – design
- Jim Beach – management
- Paul Lilly – management
- John McCoy – title

== Charts ==
Chart performance for New Light Through Old Windows
Chart (1988–2025)	Peak position
Australian Albums (ARIA)	14
Austrian Albums (Ö3 Austria)	7
Dutch Albums (Album Top 100)	59
German Albums (Offizielle Top 100)	9
Hungarian Albums (MAHASZ)	28
New Zealand Albums (RMNZ)	7
Norwegian Albums (VG-lista)	15
Swedish Albums (Sverigetopplistan)	29
Swiss Albums (Schweizer Hitparade)	24
UK Albums (Official Charts)	5
US Billboard 200	92

== Certifications ==
Region	Certification	Certified units/sales
Austria (IFPI Austria)	Gold	25,000^{*}
France (SNEP)	Gold	100,000^{*}
Germany (BVMI)	Platinum	500,000^{^}
Switzerland (IFPI Switzerland)	Gold	25,000^{^}
United Kingdom (BPI)	3× Platinum	900,000^{^}
^{*} Sales figures based on certification alone.^{^} Shipments figures based on certification alone.
