= Nathan (album) =

Studio album by Nathan Cavaleri
- Released: October 1994
- Studio: Cherokee Studios, Hollywood, California
- Genre: Blues
- Length: 43:44
- Label: Mushroom
- Producer: Jerry Greenberg; Michael Vail Blum

Nathan Cavaleri chronology
Jammin' with the Cats (1993)	Nathan (1994)	Demons (2019)

Singles from Nathan
- 1. "Workin' on It" Released: October 1994; 2. "(If Loving You Is Wrong) I Don't Want to Be Right" Released: March 1995

Nathan is the second studio album by Australian blues rock musician Nathan Cavaleri, credited to Nathan Cavaleri Band. The album was released in October 1994, peaked at number 71 on the ARIA Albums Chart.

The album features vocals from American R&B singer Sweet Pea Atkinson and Irish pop-rock singer Andrew Strong.

== Reception ==
Professional ratings
Review scores
Source	Rating
AllMusic	3/5 stars

Erik Crawford from AllMusic said "Drawing inspiration from the likes of Stevie Ray Vaughan, Mark Knopfler and Robben Ford, Cavaleri demonstrates that he has learned well from the masters. It's difficult to believe that someone so young could play with such soul and bravado, but he delivers jaw-dropping solos on track after track."

== Track listing ==
Nathan track listing
No.	Title	Writer(s)	Length
1.	"Lou's Blues" (featuring Sweet Pea Atkinson)	N. Cavaleri	3:14
2.	"Working on It" (featuring Andrew Strong)	Chris Rea	4:12
3.	"Summertime Blues" (featuring Andrew Strong)	Eddie Cochran; Jerry Capehart	3:25
4.	"Coda" (featuring Sweet Pea Atkinson)	N. Cavaleri	4:21
5.	"Back to the Blues" (featuring Sweet Pea Atkinson)	N. Cavaleri; Mark Holden	5:39
6.	"(If Loving You Is Wrong) I Don't Want to Be Right" (featuring Sweet Pea Atkinson)	Homer Banks; Carl Hampton; Raymond Jackson	5:14
7.	"Southern Nights" (featuring Sweet Pea Atkinson & Makuma Yunupingu)	N. Cavaleri; Holden	4:38
8.	"Steal Away" (featuring Sweet Pea Atkinson)	Jimmy Hughes	3:32
9.	"Bluzchanan" (featuring Sweet Pea Atkinson)	N. Cavaleri	5:57
10.	"Noodling" (featuring Sweet Pea Atkinson)	N. Cavaleri	3:32

== Charts ==
Chart performance for Nathan
Chart (1994)	Peak position
Australian Albums (ARIA)	71

== Release history ==
Release history and formats for Nathan
Country	Date	Format	Label	Catalogue
Australia	October 1994	CD	Little Rock / Mushroom	D31235
North America & Europe	1994	CD, cassette	MJJ Music / Epic	EK64438 / EPC477903 2
