= Andrew Strong =

- Born: 14 November 1973 (age 52); Dublin, Ireland
- Genres: Pop rock; soul; blues
- Occupations: Singer; actor
- Years active: 1990–present
- Website: http://www.andrewstrong.com/

Andrew Strong (born 14 November 1973) is an Irish singer and the son of Irish musician and singing coach Robert (Rob) Strong. He grew up in Shandon Park, Omagh, County Tyrone, Northern Ireland, (where his father lived while performing with showbands), and later Blessington, County Wicklow. He starred as Deco Cuffe in the 1991 cult film The Commitments based on the book by Roddy Doyle, despite being only 17 at the time of its release. In 1992, he was nominated for the BAFTA Award for Best Actor in a Supporting Role for his performance in The Commitments, and with the cast, received a nomination for the Grammy Award for Best Pop Performance by a Duo or Group with Vocals.

Since then, Strong has released a number of albums, including a platinum disc, and toured with artists including The Rolling Stones, Elton John, Prince, Lenny Kravitz and Bryan Adams.

Strong does not tour with the Commitments official tribute act, although he did perform with the original cast for the 20th anniversary concert in the O2 Arena in Dublin in March 2011.

== Tours and other projects ==
In 2003, Strong formed The Bone Yard Boys with Bent Larsen Petersen, a partnership that endures to the present day. The Bone Yard Boys' music is more contemporary with influences from Bowie, U2, Soundgarden, Sly, and "pretty much everything what inspires them".

In 2005, Strong recorded "When I'm Coming Home" in Los Angeles for the film Brothers. The following year, he released the album Greatest Hits on the Sony BMG label. This record consists of tracks from all of Strong's previous recordings and a couple of new tracks he co-wrote. During 2006 and 2007 he toured Europe and Australia to promote Greatest Hits while also writing and recording with The Bone Yard Boys.

In 2009, Strong played his first US East Coast tour since 1998, while also playing festivals in Europe, and recording with The Bone Yard Boys. In 2010 he performed concerts on a US West Coast tour and played festivals in Europe. The Commitments got back together in March 2011 for a reunion tour to mark the 20th anniversary of the movie, with four shows in Ireland ending in the O2 Arena in Dublin to critical acclaim. They played to 24,000 people over four shows and also donated 30,000 euro to the Irish Cancer Society.

In 2014 Strong performed concerts in Australia, Germany, France (on 5 July 2014 at Cabannes, for the 10th edition of the "Nuit du Blues") and Denmark.

== Discography ==
=== Albums ===
List of albums, with selected details and chart positions
Title	Year	Peak chart positions					
Title	Year	AUS	DEN	NOR	NZ	SWE	SWI
Strong	Released: 1993; Label: MCA	43	—	—	18	—	27
Out of Time	Released: 2000; Label: CMC	—	31	11	—	8	—
Gypsy's Kiss	Released: 2002; Label: EMI/RecArt Music	—	22	—	—	21	—
Greatest Hits	Released: 2005; Label: Columbia	—	—	—	—	—	—
The Commitments Years and Beyond: Live	Released: 2013; Label: Dixiefrog	—	—	—	—	—	—

=== Charted singles ===
List of charted singles, with selected chart positions
Title	Year	Peak chart positions		Album
Title	Year	IRE	AUS	Album
"Ain't Nothin' You Can Do"	1993	—	67	Strong
"Workin' on It" (Nathan Cavaleri Band featuring Andrew Strong)	1994	—	55	Nathan
"Ireland's Call"	1995	29	—	Non-album single
