= That's What They Always Say =

Single by Chris Rea

from the album The Road to Hell
- B-side: "1975"
- Released: 27 November 1989
- Length: 4:03
- Label: WEA
- Songwriter: Chris Rea
- Producers: Chris Rea; Jon Kelly

Chris Rea singles chronology
"The Road to Hell" (1989)	"That's What They Always Say" (1989)	"Tell Me There's a Heaven" (1990)

Music video
- "That's What They Always Say (2019 Remaster)" on YouTube

"That's What They Always Say" is a song by British singer-songwriter Chris Rea, released on 27 November 1989 as the second single from his tenth studio album, The Road to Hell (1989). It was written by Rea and produced by Rea and Jon Kelly. As the follow-up to "The Road to Hell", "That's What They Always Say" reached No. 83 in the UK Singles Chart and remained in the Top 100 for four weeks.

== Critical reception ==
Upon its release, Music & Media wrote: "A strong follow-up to "The Road to Hell". A rockier number with a good dance pulse." In a review of The Road to Hell, David Law of The Charlatan commented: "The angry but soulful "That's What They Always Say" intensifies the [album's theme of] despair, personalizing the plight of a gullible dreamer who believed the promises of politicians."

== Track listing ==
7" single

1. "That's What They Always Say" (Remix) – 4:03
2. "1975" – 4:30

12" single

1. "That's What They Always Say" (Rainbow Mix) – 6:40
2. "That's What They Always Say" (Remix) – 4:08
3. "1975" – 4:33

CD single (German release)

1. "That's What They Always Say" (Remix) – 4:12
2. "That's What They Always Say" (Extended Remix) – 5:45
3. "1975" – 4:39
4. "Driving Home for Christmas" – 3:59

== Personnel ==
- Chris Rea - vocals, guitars, keyboards
- Robert Ahwai - bass
- Martin Ditcham - drums, percussion
- Linda Taylor, Karen Boddington, Carol Kenyon - backing vocals

Production

- Chris Rea, Jon Kelly - producers
- Neil Amor - engineer
- Diane BJ Koné - assistant engineer
- Bill Frutz, Jack Frutz - remixers on "Rainbox Mix"

Other

- The Leisure Process - sleeve design

== Charts ==
Chart (1989–90)	Peak position
Australian Singles Chart	123
French Singles Chart	35
UK Singles Chart	83
