= Hello Friend (song) =

Single by Chris Rea

from the album On the Beach
- B-side: "Driving Home for Christmas"
- Released: 10 November 1986
- Length: 4:20
- Label: Magnet
- Songwriter: Chris Rea
- Producers: Chris Rea; Stuart Eales

Chris Rea singles chronology
"On the Beach" (1986)	"Hello Friend" (1986)	"Driving Home for Christmas" (1986)

Music video
- "Hello Friend (2019 Remaster)" on YouTube

"Hello Friend" is a song by British singer-songwriter Chris Rea, released on 10 November 1986 as the third single from his eighth studio album, On the Beach. The song was written by Rea, and produced by Rea and David Richards.

For its release as a single, Rea re-recorded the song and produced it alongside Stuart Eales. It reached No. 79 in the UK Singles Chart and remained in the Top 100 for six weeks.

The single's B-side is the first version of "Driving Home for Christmas" that Rea recorded. The song was re-recorded for New Light Through Old Windows in 1988 and released as a single in its own right. A special double 7-inch edition of the single was also released, containing two live tracks recorded earlier in 1986 at Montreux. The re-recorded version of "Hello Friend" was later included on the two-disc deluxe and remastered edition of On the Beach, released by Magnet in 2019.

== Critical reception ==
On its release, Chris Eary of the Reading Evening Post wrote: "Double record pack featuring live and studio stuff with the title being a gruff smoocher." In a review of On the Beach, Glenn A. Baker of the Sydney Morning Herald commented: "Rea's atmospheric songs, particularly "Little Blonde Plaits" and "Hello Friend", sound like they should be on the soundtrack of a David Puttnam film." Rob Caldwell of AllMusic retrospectively noted the album's recurring theme of "deal[ing] with remembrance and old love", and selected "Hello Friend" as one example of this.

== Track listing ==
7" single

1. "Hello Friend" (Re-record) – 4:20
2. "Driving Home for Christmas" – 4:34

7" single (UK special double pack)

1. "Hello Friend" (Re-record) – 4:20
2. "Driving Home for Christmas" – 4:34
3. "It's All Gone" (Recorded live At Montreux) – 8:12
4. "Steel River" (Recorded live At Montreux) – 7:58

12" single

1. "Hello Friend" (Full Version) – 4:46
2. "Driving Home for Christmas" – 4:34

== Personnel ==
Production

- Chris Rea, Stuart Eales - producers of "Hello Friend" and "Driving Home for Christmas"
- Dave Richards - engineer on Montreux live tracks

Other

- Lo Cole - cover painting
- Mark Farrow - sleeve design

== Charts ==
Chart (1986)	Peak position
UK Singles Chart	79
