= Let It Loose =

Let It Loose may refer to:

- "Let It Loose" (Rolling Stones song), 1972
- "Let It Loose" (Chris Rea song), 1983
- Let It Loose (album), a 1987 album by Gloria Estefan and the Miami Sound Machine
