= Nathan Cavaleri =

Australian singer-songwriter and guitarist

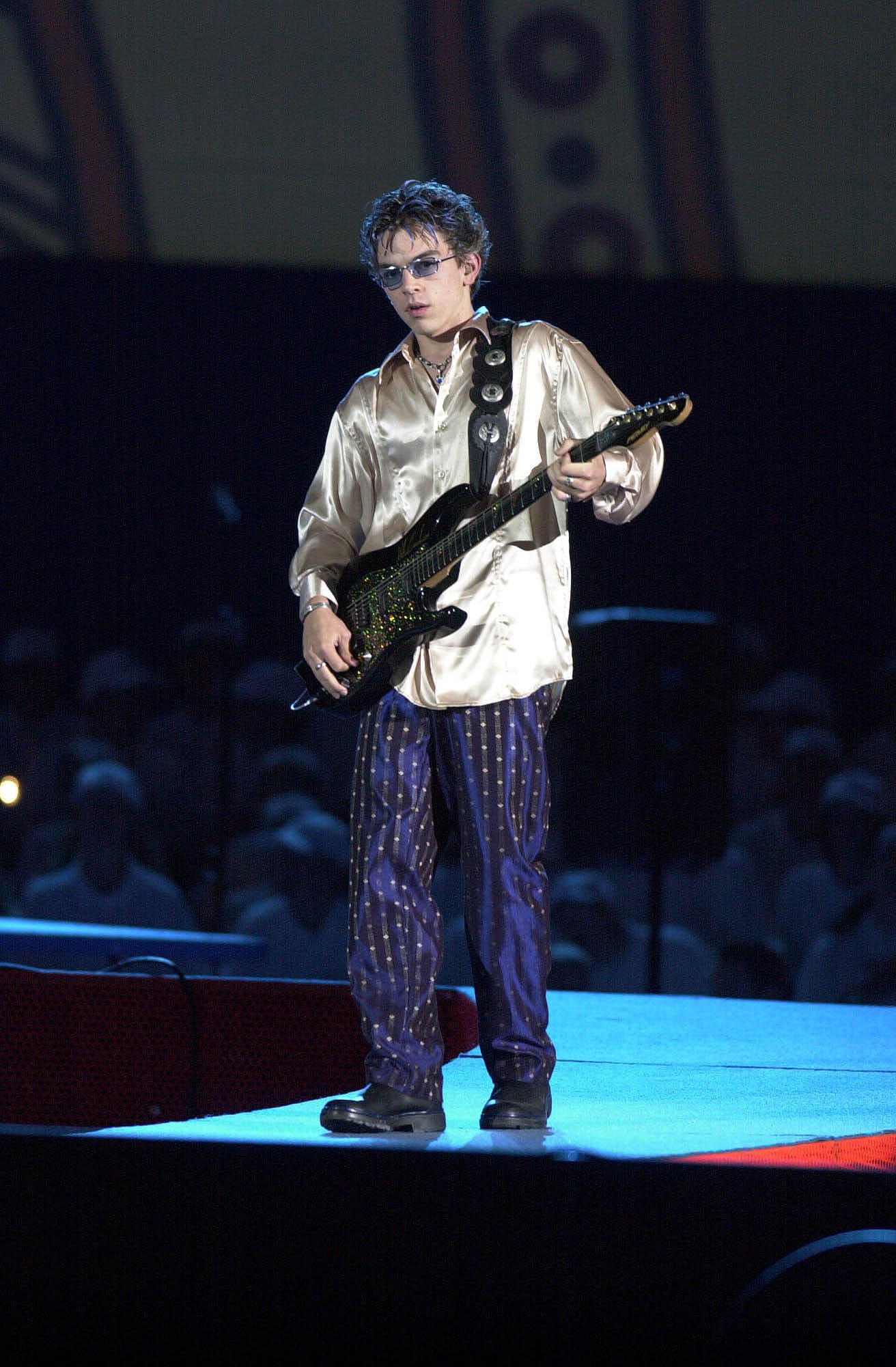
- Cavaleri performing onstage with his guitar at the Opening Ceremony of the 2000 Sydney Paralympic Games

Background information
- Born: 18 June 1982 (age 44); Sydney, New South Wales, Australia
- Genres: Rock, hard rock, blues, blues rock, alternative rock
- Occupations: Singer-songwriter, guitarist, former child actor.
- Instruments: Guitar, vocals
- Years active: 1991–present
- Labels: Mushroom/Festival, MJJ/Epic
- Website: www.nathancavaleri.com

Nathan Cavaleri (born 18 June 1982) is an Australian blues rock singer-songwriter and guitarist, and a former child actor. He issued two albums as a solo artist, Jammin' with the Cats (1993) and Nathan (1994). He has been a member of various groups including Dirty Skanks (2003–2010), and Nat Col and the Kings (2010–2012). At the age of six Cavaleri was diagnosed with leukaemia and has been in remission since he was 13. As a child actor he appeared in the American film Camp Nowhere (1994) and starred in Paws (1997).

== Biography ==
=== 1982–1992: early years ===
Nathan Cavaleri was born on 18 June 1982 and grew up in Ruse, New South Wales. His father, Frank Cavaleri, was a bricklayer and part-time guitarist; his mother is Joanne, and the couple also have a younger son. Cavaleri began playing guitar at the age of five; he began by using a full-sized guitar with a shaved neck, which was done to accommodate his smaller hands.

Cavaleri was diagnosed with leukaemia at age six; he continued playing guitar to take his mind off the disease. He received chemotherapy treatment and, by May 1993, he was in remission. He asked the Australian branch of Starlight Children's Foundation, a charity organisation, to fulfil his wish – at the age of nine he played with Mark Knopfler; he described Cavaleri's playing as "unbelievable". Knopfler also donated a gold plaque awarded to his group, Dire Straits, for their album Brothers in Arms (1985).

Regarded as a child prodigy, Cavaleri was later trained by, and at age thirteen, eventually toured with, B.B. King. King described Cavaleri as "the future of the blues". In May 1992 Cavaleri released his debut single, "Little Egypt", which was a cover version of Elvis Presley's track from 1964, and peaked at No. 63 in Australia. Its B-side, "Nat's Blues", was co-written by Cavaleri with his father, Frank.

=== 1993–1995: Jammin' with the Cats & Nathan ===
On 12 April 1993 he issued his debut album, Jammin' with the Cats, on Little Rock/Mushroom Records, which was produced by "Buzz" Bidstrup (Riptides, GANGgajang, The Sunnyboys). Bevan Hannan of The Canberra Times described Cavaleri as a "super guitar technician" and felt the album "range[s] from shuffle, blues and jazz to out and out rock. It is the type of music you would expect to hear on a tonight chat show." For the album he worked with Jimmy Barnes, Diesel and Tommy Emmanuel. It peaked at No. 33 on the ARIA Albums Chart.

In September 1993 Cavaleri and Barnes released a cover version of the La De Da's' single, "Gonna See My Baby Tonight", from November 1971. Fifty thousand promotional copies were included as give-aways in Uncle Tobys breakfast cereal boxes. Barnes provided lead vocals, rhythm guitar and produced the track, Bidstrup was on drums, Michael Hegerty on bass guitar and Jeff Neill on rhythm guitar and backing vocals.

For his second album, Nathan (1994), he used Teddy Andreadis on keyboards, Curt Bisquera on drums, Jeff Berlin on bass guitar, Randy Jacobs on guitar and Sweet Pea Atkinson and Andrew Strong. AllMusic's Erik Crawford noted that "he delivers jaw-dropping solos on track after track" as he "offers up an earthy blues effort that fits nicely alongside other teen blues sensations." The album provided two singles, "Workin' on It" (September 1994, No. 55 in Australia) and "(If Loving You Is Wrong) I Don't Want to Be Right" (March 1995). For its United States release, Cavaleri signed with Epic Records and Michael Jackson's label, MJJ Music.

He has played with Robben Ford, and Aaron Neville, An instrumental version of his song "Lou's Blues" is featured in the film Free Willy 2: The Adventure Home, and he has served as a spokesman for Peavey Guitars.

=== 1996–2002: hiatus ===
Cavaleri finished secondary school in the mid 1990s, paused his musical career and became a brickie's labourer.

On 18 October 2000 Cavaleri performed during the Opening Ceremony of the 11th Paralympic Games in Sydney.

Cavaleri reflected on his early career said in 2004, "When I was doing all of that stuff (it) doesn't even feel like it was my life ... It feels like a haze. It feels like a dream. It just feels like images in the head, almost like a western movie." "I just totally escaped music ... It can be a dark time when you’re finding yourself creatively."

=== 2003–2012: Dirty Skanks & Nat Col and the Kings ===
In 2003 he formed a group, Dirty Skanks, with Col Hatchman on drums, then a member of The Screaming Jets. Dirty Skanks released the album Voluptuosity on Jaynie Records in 2004.

By 2010 Dirty Skanks was renamed as Nat Col and the Kings. Cavaleri writes and arranges his own material as the group tours, by 2012 the line-up included Toni Bird on backing vocals and Kenny Jewell on bass guitar. Nat Col and the Kings released three EPs in 2010, 2011, and 2012 on Jaynie Records.

=== 2012–2018: health concerns ===
By 2012 Cavaleri started having health concerns and noticed he was getting panic attacks before gigs. Cavaleri got through a few more gigs but soon decided he did not want to keep on touring. He suffered serious insomnia, anxiety and depression. Cavaleri met with doctors who suggested medication, but he instead adopted a more holistic approach; completing a mindfulness course, visiting a psychologist regularly, meeting a clinical nutritionist and exploring integrated medicine. He undertook activities away from music, like surfing and meditation.

At the start of 2016, Cavaleri quietly made his return to the stage for the first time in three and a half years, performing one song with Kenny Jewell at a local gig. This performance reignited Cavaleri's passion for music.

=== 2018–2021: relaunch of career and Demons ===
2019 saw Nathan Cavaleri return to the stage after a 5-year struggle with anxiety/depression.

In October 2019, Cavaleri released the 4-track EP Demons. All four tracks were released as singles, with the single "29 Gold Stars" receiving rave reviews from triple j, double j, MusicFeeds and PileRats.

In 2020, three more singles were released, before a forthcoming studio album, also titled Demons, set for release on 6 August 2020.

=== 2022–present: Miracles ===
In April 2023, Cavaleri announced the forthcoming release of his fourth studio album, Miracles. The album was released on 16 June 2023.

== Discography ==
=== Studio albums ===
List of studio albums, with selected details and chart positions
Title	Album details	Peak chart positions
Title	Album details	AUS
Jammin' with the Cats	Released: April 1993; Label: Little Rock/Mushroom (D24012); Formats: CD	33
Nathan (Nathan Cavaleri Band)	Released: October 1994; Label: Little Rock/Mushroom (D31235); Formats: CD	71
Demons	Released: 6 August 2020; Label: Nathan Cavaleri; Formats: Digital Download, streaming	-
Miracles	Released: 16 June 2023; Label: Nathan Cavaleri, ABC Music; Formats: Digital Download, streaming	TBA

=== Extended plays ===
List of extended plays, with selected details
Title	EP details
Demons	Released: 3 October 2019; Label: Nathan Cavaleri; Formats: Digital Download, streaming

=== Singles ===
Title	Year	Peak chart positions	Album
Title	Year	AUS	Album
"Little Egypt" (with Chris Bailey)	1992	63	non-album single
"Josh's Boogie"	1993	promo	Jammin' with the Cats
"Gonna See My Baby Tonight" (with Jimmy Barnes)	1993	promo	non-album single
"Workin' On It" (featuring Andrew Strong)	1994	55	Nathan
"(If Loving You Is Wrong) I Don't Want to Be Right" (featuring Sweet Pea Atkinson)	1995	-	Nathan
"Demons"	2018	-	Demons EP
"Rising Sun"	2018	-	Demons EP
"29 Gold Stars"	2019	-	Demons EP
"Chucky"	2019	-	Demons EP
"Castles in the Sky"	2020	-	Demons
"Hug"	2020	-	Demons
"Before You Check Out"	2020	-	Demons
"Cool Change"	2022	-	Miracles
"Querencia"	2023	-	Miracles
"Broken Lines"	2023	-	Miracles

== Filmography ==
=== Film ===
- Camp Nowhere (1994) as Steve
- Paws (1997) as Zac (final film role)

=== Television ===
- Baywatch Nights (1995) as Willy Logan / Willy Simon
