= Wired to the Moon (disambiguation) =

Wired to the Moon is an album by Chris Rea.

Wired to the Moon may also refer to:

- "Wired to the Moon", a song by Chris Rea from the above album
- "Wired to the Moon", a song by Quiet Riot from the album Rehab
- Wired to the Moon: Frank Randle - A Life, a biography of comedian Frank Randle
