= Ace of Hearts (Chris Rea song) =

Single by Chris Rea

from the album Wired to the Moon
- B-side: "True Love"
- Released: 14 September 1984
- Length: 4:29 (album version); 3:49 (single version)
- Label: Magnet
- Songwriter: Chris Rea
- Producers: Chris Rea; Dave Richards

Chris Rea singles chronology
"Touche D'Amour" (1984)	"Ace of Hearts" (1984)	"Stainsby Girls" (1985)
"All Summer Long" (1985)	"Ace of Hearts" (1985)	"It's All Gone" (1986)

"Ace of Hearts" is a song by British singer-songwriter Chris Rea, released by Magnet on 14 September 1984 as the fourth and final single from his sixth studio album, Wired to the Moon. The song was written by Rea, and produced by Rea and Dave Richards.

"Ace of Hearts" reached number 79 in the UK Singles Chart in October 1984. A re-issue saw the single peak one position higher at number 78 in November 1985. In 1988, Rea re-recorded "Ace of Hearts" for his album New Light Through Old Windows.

== Critical reception ==
Upon its release as a single, Jerry Smith of Music Week stated, "An excellent ballad whose bouncy rhythm, intricate keyboards and sparkling sax plus the effective vocals and vibrant guitar should guarantee plenty of radio exposure. Could do well." In a review of the 1985 re-issue, Paul Benbow of the Reading Evening Post wrote, "Old gravel voice with a re-release due to popular demand."

In a retrospective review of Wired to the Moon, Sharon Mawer of AllMusic described the song as a "soft rock number – almost MOR" and one which is "crying out for daytime radio play or a top-selling commercial artist to cover [it]". In a 2021 retrospective on Rea's "30 best tracks for the open road", Dig! picked "Ace of Hearts" as number 12 on the list. They considered the song to be a "soft rock slow burner" and felt the lyrics were "as much about a heartbroken soul longing for love as it is about a down-on-his-luck gambler waiting for a winning hand".

== Track listing ==
7-inch single (UK release)

1. "Ace of Hearts" (Special Remix) – 3:49
2. Excerpts from "I Can Hear Your Heart Beat" (Recorded live at the Montreux Jazz Festival) – 7:00

7-inch double-pack single (UK release)

1. "Ace of Hearts" (Special Remix) – 3:49
2. Excerpts from "I Can Hear Your Heart Beat" (Recorded live at the Montreux Jazz Festival) – 7:00
3. "Bitter Sweet" – 1:13
4. "Auf Immer" – 4:41

7-inch single (German and French release)

1. "Ace of Hearts" (Special Remix) – 3:49
2. "True Love" – 3:40

12-inch and cassette single (UK release)

1. "Ace of Hearts" (Special Remix) – 6:34
2. "I Can Hear Your Heart Beat" – 3:28
3. "From Love to Love" – 3:31
4. "True Love" – 3:40
5. "Smile" – 3:27

12-inch single (German release)

1. "Ace of Hearts" (Special Remix) – 6:34
2. Excerpts from "I Can Hear Your Heart Beat" (Recorded live at the Montreux Jazz Festival) – 7:00

12-inch single (French release)

1. "Ace of Hearts" – 6:34
2. "I Can Hear Your Heart Beat" – 3:28
3. "Love to Love" – 3:31
4. "True Love" – 3:40

== Personnel ==
Credits are adapted from the UK CD1 and CD2 liner notes and the Wired to the Moon sleeve notes.

"Ace of Hearts"

- Chris Rea – vocals, guitar, fretless bass, keyboards, piano
- Jerry Stevenson – guitar, all acoustics
- Kevin Powell – bass
- Jeff Seopardi – drums, brushes

Production

- Chris Rea, Dave Richards – producers

Other

- The Artful Dodgers – sleeve design

== Charts ==
Chart (1984)	Peak position
Ireland (IRMA)	26
UK Singles (Official Charts)	79

Chart (1985)	Peak position
UK Singles (Official Charts)	78
