= I Can Hear Your Heartbeat =

1983 song by Chris Rea

Single by Chris Rea

from the album Water Sign
- B-side: "From Love to Love"
- Released: April 1983
- Length: 3:28
- Label: Magnet
- Songwriter: Chris Rea
- Producers: Chris Rea; David Richards

Chris Rea singles chronology
"Let It Loose" (1983)	"I Can Hear Your Heartbeat" (1983)	"Hey You" (1983)

Music video
- "I Can Hear Your Heartbeat (1983 Original Version)" on YouTube

"I Can Hear Your Heartbeat" is a song by British singer-songwriter Chris Rea, released in 1983 as the second single from his fifth studio album Water Sign. It was written by Rea, and produced by Rea and David Richards. "I Can Hear Your Heartbeat" reached number 60 in the UK Singles Chart and number 14 in Ireland.

== Critical reception ==
In a retrospective review of Water Sign, Sharon Mawer of AllMusic commented on the song's "driving rock beat" and recommended the track by labelling it an AMG Pick Track.

== Track listing ==
7-inch single

1. "I Can Hear Your Heartbeat" – 3:28
2. "From Love to Love" – 3:31

2x 7-inch single (UK limited edition release)

1. "I Can Hear Your Heartbeat" – 3:28
2. "From Love to Love" – 3:31
3. "Let It Loose" – 3:37
4. "Urban Samurai" – 4:31

12-inch single

1. "I Can Hear Your Heartbeat (Special Extended Mix)" – 5:50
2. "From Love to Love" – 3:31
3. "Friends Across the Water (Instrumental)" – 3:45

12-inch single (Canadian release)

1. "I Can Hear Your Heartbeat (New Re-edited Club Mix)" – 8:15
2. "Let It Loose (Extended Club Mix)" – 5:45

== Personnel ==
- Chris Rea - vocals, instruments, producer
- Ian Hawkins - bass
- Kevin Leech - piano
- David Richards - producer
- Kevin Unger - re-editing on "I Can Hear Your Heartbeat (New Re-edited Club Mix)"
- Shoot That Tiger! - sleeve design
- Fin Costello - photography
- Danny Kleinman - hand tinting

== Charts ==
Chart (1983)	Peak position
Belgium Singles Chart	15
Dutch Singles Chart	25
Irish Singles Chart	14
New Zealand Singles Chart	46
Sweden Singles Chart	7
UK Singles Chart	60

== 1988 version ==
"I Can Hear Your Heartbeat"

Single by Chris Rea

from the album New Light Through Old Windows
- B-side: "Loving You Again (Live Version)"
- Released: 10 October 1988
- Length: 3:24
- Label: WEA
- Songwriter: Chris Rea
- Producers: Chris Rea; Jon Kelly

Chris Rea singles chronology
"On the Beach" (1988)	"I Can Hear Your Heartbeat" (1988)	"Fool (If You Think It's Over)" (1988)

In 1988, Rea re-recorded "I Can Hear Your Heartbeat" for his album New Light Through Old Windows, with the new version being released as a single on 10 October 1988. Produced by Rea and Jon Kelly, it reached number 74 in the UK and number 26 in Ireland.

=== Critical reception ===
In a retrospective review of New Light Through Old Windows, Mike DeGagne of AllMusic said: "Rea's soothing voice is indeed attractive, and the songs that are included on this set are wisely chosen examples of his smooth style. "I Can Hear Your Heartbeat" and "Stainsby Girls" are two of the better tracks that showcase his slick, demure-like manner."

=== Track listing ===
7-inch single

1. "I Can Hear Your Heartbeat" – 3:25
2. "Loving You Again (Live Version)" – 5:20

12-inch single

1. "I Can Hear Your Heartbeat (Extended Mix)" – 5:40
2. "Giverny" – 5:34
3. "Loving You Again (Live Version)" – 5:20

CD single

1. "I Can Hear Your Heartbeat" – 3:26
2. "Giverny" – 5:34
3. "I Can Hear Your Heartbeat (Extended Mix)" – 5:40
4. "Loving You Again (Live Version)" – 5:20

CD single (Japanese release)

1. "I Can Hear Your Heartbeat" – 3:25
2. "On the Beach - Summer '88" – 3:46

=== Charts ===
Chart (1988)	Peak position
Irish Singles Chart	26
UK Singles Chart	74

=== Personnel ===
- Chris Rea - vocals, instruments, producer
- Jon Kelly - producer
- Justin Shirley-Smith - engineer
- Paul Lilly, Danny Hyde - mixing on "Loving You Again (Live Version)"
- David Richards - producer of "Giverny"
- Greg Jakobek - sleeve illustration
