= Loving You (Chris Rea song) =

Single by Chris Rea

from the album Chris Rea
- B-side: "Let Me Be the One"
- Released: 5 March 1982
- Length: 3:47
- Label: Magnet
- Songwriter(s): Chris Rea
- Producer(s): Jon Kelly, Chris Rea

Chris Rea singles chronology
"Dancing Girls" (1980)	"Loving You" (1982)	"Every Beat of My Heart" (1982)

Music video
- "Loving You (1982)" on YouTube

"Loving You" is a song by British singer-songwriter Chris Rea, released on 5 March 1982 as the lead single from his fourth studio album, Chris Rea. It was written by Rea and produced by Jon Kelly and Rea. "Loving You" reached No. 65 in the UK Singles Chart and remained in the Top 100 for three weeks. It also peaked at No. 88 on the US Billboard Hot 100.

"Loving You" features an eighteen-piece string section. A music video was filmed to promote the single, directed by Dave Mallett.

== Critical reception ==
On its release, Billboard listed the song as a recommended 'Pop' choice under their "Top Single Picks". Cash Box listed the single as one of their "feature picks" during February 1982. They wrote: "Rea sounds a little more raspy-throated since the monster "Fool (If You Think It's Over)" in 1978 but his music still has that slick, thick production sound, like a pop blues." In a review of Chris Rea, The Philadelphia Inquirer described the song as "especially appealing" on an album of "superbly structured songs, mostly in the ballad form".

== Track listing ==
7" single

1. "Loving You" – 3:47
2. "Let Me Be the One" – 3:42

7" single (Japanese release)

1. "Loving You" – 3:47
2. "One Sweet Tender Touch" – 3:48

7" single (US promo)

1. "Loving You" – 3:44
2. "Loving You" – 3:44

12" single

1. "Loving You" – 3:47
2. "Let Me Be the One" – 3:42

== Personnel ==
Loving You

- Chris Rea - vocals, guitar, electric piano, piano
- Carol Kenyon, Katie Kissoon, Linda Taylor - backing vocals
- Jim Mullen - guitar
- Bruce Lynch - bass
- Dave Mattacks - drums
- Andrew Powell - string arrangement

Production

- Jon Kelly - producer, engineer
- Chris Rea - producer

== Charts ==
Chart (1982)	Peak position
UK Singles Chart	65
US Billboard Hot 100	88
