= Bombollini =

Single by Chris Rea

from the album Wired to the Moon
- B-side: "True Love"
- Released: 11 May 1984
- Length: 6:10
- Label: Magnet
- Songwriter: Chris Rea
- Producers: Chris Rea; Dave Richards

Chris Rea singles chronology
"I Don't Know What It Is But I Love It" (1984)	"Bombollini" (1984)	"Touche d'Amour" (1984)

Music video
- "Bombollini" on YouTube

"Bombollini" is a song by British singer-songwriter Chris Rea, released on 11 May 1984 as the second single from his sixth studio album, Wired to the Moon. It was written by Rea, and produced by Rea and Dave Richards. The song failed to make a chart appearance on the UK Singles Chart but reached No. 21 on the Irish Singles Chart.

== Critical reception ==
On its release, Colin Davidson of the Evening Express wrote: "The comeback continues in fine style. This six minute epic is one good reason why you should buy the Wired to the Moon album." Frank Hopkinson of Number One felt the song "starts off like a teeming eco-system of sound building up slowly and surely". He added: "Those of you with a Dire Straits persuasion may well find it worth further investigation."

In a review of Wired to the Moon, Paul Speelman of The Age described the song as "smouldering". Sharon Mawer of AllMusic retrospectively wrote: "With the success of the band Incantation and ethnic South American music in 1982-1983, Rea introduced Wired to the Moon, with "Bombollini," which was over six minutes of jungle-sounding drums and the haunting sound of pan pipes."

== Track listing ==
7" single

1. "Bombollini" – 6:10
2. "True Love" – 3:40

12" single

1. "Bombollini" – 6:10
2. "Bombollini (Excerpts From)" – 4:20
3. "True Love" – 3:40

12" single (Ireland only edition)

1. "Bombollini" – 6:10
2. "I Can Hear Your Heartbeat" (Special Extended Mix) – 5:50

== Personnel ==
Bombollini

- Chris Rea - vocals, guitars, keyboards, bass, piano, marimba
- Jeff Seopardi - drums, percussion

Production

- Chris Rea, Dave Richards - producers

Other

- Torchlight, London - cover design

== Charts ==
Chart (1984)	Peak position
Irish Singles Chart	21
