= Jammin' with the Cats =

Studio album by Nathan Cavaleri
- Released: 12 April 1993
- Label: Little Rock / Mushroom Records
- Producer: "Buzz" Bidstrup

Nathan Cavaleri chronology
Jammin' with the Cats (1993)	Nathan (1994)

Jammin' with the Cats is the debut studio album by Australian blues rock musician Nathan Cavaleri. The album was released in April 1993 and peaked at number 33 on the ARIA Charts.

== Track listing ==
1. "Cavazalley" - 2:56
2. "Josh's Boogie" - 2:47
3. "The Stumble" - 3:19
4. "12 Page Blues" - 3:51
5. "Sleepwalk" - 2:47
6. "Jazz for Miss Robson" - 3:53
7. "Room 335" - 3:16
8. "All for Love" - 3:53
9. "Caldonia" 2:57
10. "Winter Time Blues" - 4:15
11. "Nat's Blues" - 4:00

== Charts ==
Chart (1993)	Peak position
Australian Albums (ARIA)	33

== Release history ==
Country	Date	Format	Label	Catalogue
Australia	12 April 1993	CD, cassette	Little Rock / Mushroom Records	D24012
