= On the Beach (Chris Rea album) =

Studio album by Chris Rea
- Released: 14 April 1986
- Recorded: August – December 1985
- Studio: Anderburr Recording Studios (Bray, Berkshire); Mountain Studios (Montreux, Switzerland)
- Genre: Rock, soft rock, adult contemporary
- Length: 59:58 (CD); 48:40 (LP)
- Label: Magnet
- Producer: Chris Rea; David Richards

Chris Rea chronology
Shamrock Diaries (1985)	On the Beach (1986)	Dancing with Strangers (1987)

Singles from On the Beach
- 1. "It's All Gone" Released: March 1986; 2. "On the Beach" Released: May 1986; 3. "Hello Friend" Released: November 1986

Professional ratings
Review scores
Source	Rating
AllMusic	4/5 stars

On the Beach is the eighth studio album by British singer-songwriter Chris Rea, released in April 1986, and built on the success of the preceding Shamrock Diaries. It reached No. 11 on the UK Albums Chart (and also in Sweden), topped the Dutch charts (where it charted for more than nine months), reached number two in West Germany and No. 4 in New Zealand (where is also spent more than nine months in the charts). It also reached the top 10 in Norway. In 2019, a deluxe remastered version of the album was released.

== Songs ==
In an interview for the deluxe edition of the album, Rea said of the song Giverny, written after a visit to Monet's celebrated home, "I didn't want to be there. I was only there because she (his wife, Joan) was there... so there's kinda, a funny twist to it".

== Critical reception ==
AllMusic notes that, "while The Road to Hell shows the darker side of Rea's worldview, On the Beach is an excellent introduction to his brighter, more optimistic songwriting". A retrospective review finds that the album "taps into the same kind of jazzy, introspective pop/soul sound that the likes of John Martyn, Joni Mitchell and Van Morrison were flirting with in the same period, helped by an excellent band including Fairport Convention/XTC drummer Dave Mattacks", adding that Little Blonde Plaits is "a vehicle for [Max] Middleton's expressive Mini Moog, very redolent of his atmospheric playing on John Martyn’s Glorious Fool".

== Track listing ==
All tracks are written by Chris Rea.

On the Beach track listing
No.	Title	Length
1.	"On the Beach"	5:04
2.	"Little Blonde Plaits"	4:17
3.	"Giverny"	5:39
4.	"Lucky Day"	3:57
5.	"Just Passing Through"	5:20
6.	"It's All Gone"	7:28
7.	"Hello Friend"	4:19
8.	"Two Roads"	3:44
9.	"Light of Hope"	4:34
10.	"Auf Immer und Ewig"	4:11
11.	"Freeway" (CD only)	4:12
12.	"Bless Them All" (CD only)	2:30
13.	"Crack That Mould" (CD only)	4:34

== Personnel ==
=== Musicians ===
- Chris Rea – all vocals, keyboards, acoustic piano, guitars, slide guitar, fretless bass
- Max Middleton – acoustic piano, Rhodes, Minimoog, synthesizers
- Kevin Leach – keyboards
- Robert Awhai – guitars
- Eoghan O'Neill – bass guitar
- Dave Mattacks – drums
- Adrian Rea – drums
- Martin Ditcham – percussion

=== Production ===
- Chris Rea – producer
- David Richards – producer, mixing
- Stewart Eales – recording engineer
- Stylorouge – sleeve design
- Ekkeheart Gurlitt – photography
- Francoise La Port – photography (Chris Rea)

== Singles ==
1. "It's All Gone" b/w "Crack That Mould", "Look Out For Me", "Bless Them All", "Let's Dance" (original version)
2. "On the Beach" b/w "On the Beach (special remix)", "If Anybody Asks You", "One Golden Rule" (live), "Midnight Blue"
3. "Hello Friend" (re-recording) b/w "Driving Home for Christmas" (original version), "It's All Gone" (live), "Steel River"

== Charts ==
=== Weekly charts ===
Weekly chart performance for On the Beach
Chart (1986)	Peak position
Australian Albums (Kent Music Report)	37
Austrian Albums (Ö3 Austria)	20
Dutch Albums (Album Top 100)	1
German Albums (Offizielle Top 100)	2
New Zealand Albums (RMNZ)	4
Norwegian Albums (VG-lista)	7
Swedish Albums (Sverigetopplistan)	11
Swiss Albums (Schweizer Hitparade)	10
UK Albums (OCC)	11

=== Year-end charts ===
Year-end chart performance for On the Beach
Chart (1986)	Position
Dutch Albums (Album Top 100)	16
German Albums (Offizielle Top 100)	14
New Zealand Albums (RMNZ)	27

== Certifications ==
Certifications for On the Beach
Region	Certification	Certified units/sales
France (SNEP)	Gold	100,000^{*}
Germany (BVMI)	Gold	250,000^{^}
Netherlands (NVPI)	Gold	50,000^{^}
New Zealand (RMNZ)	Platinum	15,000^{^}
United Kingdom (BPI)	Platinum	300,000^{^}
^{*} Sales figures based on certification alone.^{^} Shipments figures based on certification alone.
