= Every Beat of My Heart (Chris Rea song) =

1982 song by Chris Rea

Single by Chris Rea

from the album Chris Rea
- B-side: "Don't Look Back"
- Released: 7 May 1982
- Length: 3:20
- Label: Magnet
- Songwriter(s): Chris Rea
- Producer(s): Jon Kelly; Chris Rea

Chris Rea singles chronology
"Loving You" (1982)	"Every Beat of My Heart" (1982)	"Let It Loose" (1983)

"Every Beat of My Heart" is a song by English singer-songwriter Chris Rea released by Magnet on 7 May 1982 as the second and final single from his fourth studio album, Chris Rea. The song was written by Rea, and produced by Jon Kelly and Rea. It failed to reach the top 100 of the UK Singles Chart, but did reach number 129 in Record Business magazine's Bubbling Under Singles chart.

== Critical reception ==
Upon its release as a single, Denis Kilcommons of the Huddersfield Daily Examiner praised "Every Beat of My Heart" as a "beautiful ballad" which is "immacuately performed". The Mansfield & Sutton Recorder described it as an "extremely powerful ballad that should put Chris in the charts" and added, "Undoubtedly he is one of the best singer/songwriters we have in this country today." The Runcorn Guardian called it a "taste of Rea at his best" and continued, "This Geordie singer/songwriter produces consistently high quality sounds, but hitherto, has only received vicarious success for his work." Sunie of Record Mirror was negative in her review, noting that Rea "husk[s] away on an Adult Orientated (i.e. Boring) ballad, and highly soporific it is too". She continued, "Not much to my taste, but of inestimable therapeutic value for insomnia sufferers."

== Track listing ==
7–inch single (UK)

1. "Every Beat of My Heart" – 3:20
2. "Don't Look Back" – 3:44

== Personnel ==
"Every Beat of My Heart"

- Chris Rea – vocals, guitar
- Martin Kershaw – guitar
- Skaila Kanga – harp
- David Snell – harp
- Steve Lawrence – string bass
- Andrew Powell – string arrangement, conductor

Production

- Jon Kelly – production, engineer
- Chris Rea – production

Other

- Brian Aris – cover photography

== Charts ==
Chart (1982)	Peak position
Australia (Kent Music Report)	53
Netherlands (Single Top 100)	39
UK Bubbling Under Singles (Record Business)	129
