= I Don't Know What It Is But I Love It =

1984 single by Chris Rea

Single by Chris Rea

from the album Wired to the Moon
- B-side: "Mystery Man"
- Released: 24 February 1984
- Length: 3:40
- Label: Magnet
- Songwriter: Chris Rea
- Producers: Chris Rea, Dave Richards

Chris Rea singles chronology
| "Love's Strange Ways" (1983) | "I Don't Know What It Is But I Love It" (1984) | "Bombollini" (1984) |

Music video
- "I Don't Know What It Is But I Love It (1984)" on YouTube

"I Don't Know What It Is But I Love It" is a song by British singer-songwriter Chris Rea, released on 24 February 1984 as the lead single from his sixth studio album, Wired to the Moon. It was written by Rea, and produced by Rea and Dave Richards. The song reached No. 65 in the UK Singles Chart and remained in the Top 100 for four weeks. It also peaked at No. 23 on the Irish Singles Chart.

The track was popular with the squad of Liverpool F.C. in their campaign for the 1983-4 European Cup, and they sang it in the tunnel before walking out before the final against A.S. Roma, which some players attributed as one reason for their eventual victory.

== Critical reception ==
On its release, the Mansfield & Sutton Recorder felt the song "showcases a new immediacy in Rea's music". Paul Benbow of the Reading Evening Post commented: "Gruff-voiced middle of the road stuff, ideal for Radio 2." Graham K of Record Mirror criticised the single as being one of a number that week that "epitomise[s] the current trend for band and companies to unerringly strive for the lowest common denominator at all costs".

In a review of Wired to the Moon, Paul Speelman of The Age wrote: "Probably the outstanding song on this album is the title track, but there is also the delightfully-named "I Don't Know What It Is But I Love It", a lovely contrast". In a retrospective review, Sharon Mawer of AllMusic described the song as being an "uptempo Elton John-style track".

== Track listing ==
7" single

1. "I Don't Know What It Is But I Love It" – 3:40
2. "Mystery Man" – 3:22

7" single (Brazilian release)

1. "I Don't Know What It Is But I Love It" – 3:40
2. "Touché d'Amour" – 3:30

12" single

1. "I Don't Know What It Is But I Love It" (Extended Version) – 5:25
2. "I Don't Know What It Is But I Love It" – 3:40
3. "Mystery Man" – 3:22

== Personnel ==
- Chris Rea - vocals, guitar, bass, keyboards producer
- Dave Richards - synthesizer, producer
- Jerry Stevenson - guitar
- Jeff Seopardi - drums

Other

- Steve Rapport - photography
- Stylo Rouge - sleeve design

== Charts ==
| Chart (1984) | Peak position |
|---|---|
| Irish Singles Chart | 23 |
| UK Singles Chart | 65 |
