= Shamrock Diaries =

Studio album by Chris Rea
- Released: 17 May 1985
- Recorded: December 1984
- Studios: Chipping Norton Recording Studios (Oxfordshire, UK); Bray Studios (Berkshire, UK); Mountain Studios (Montreux, Switzerland).
- Genre: Album-oriented rock
- Length: 48:45
- Label: Magnet
- Producers: Chris Rea; David Richards

Chris Rea chronology
Wired to the Moon (1984)	Shamrock Diaries (1985)	On the Beach (1986)

Singles from Shamrock Diaries
- 1. "Stainsby Girls" Released: March 1985; 2. "Josephine" Released: 22 June 1985

Professional ratings
Review scores
Source	Rating
AllMusic	3.5/5 stars

Shamrock Diaries is the seventh studio album by British singer-songwriter Chris Rea, released in May 1985. This album represents the beginning of a creative and commercial zenith for Rea. Shamrock Diaries was a huge seller in Europe, reaching the top 20 in several countries including Ireland, West Germany, Czechoslovakia, Sweden and the United Kingdom, and spent forty two weeks in the Dutch charts, peaking at No. 3. The album was also successful in Australia, where it charted in the top 50. "Stainsby Girls" became Rea's first Top 30 single since 1978's "Fool If You Think It's Over". In 1988, Magnet Records was taken over by Warner Bros. Records, who re-released Shamrock Diaries with a significantly remixed version of "Josephine". The original version was used in the 2019 deluxe re-issue of the album.

== Composition ==
Rea wrote the material during a protracted stay in Ireland. In a fresh interview for the sleeve notes in the deluxe version of the album (2019), he recalls how Dublin "reminded me so much of my home town.... Middlesbrough back then was about 65% Irish... And half my family are from Ireland." The two most popular tracks from the album were written for members of Rea's family. "Stainsby Girls" was a tribute to his wife, Joan, a former student of the Stainsby Secondary Modern School. "Josephine" was written for his daughter, after whom it is named. Almost a decade later, Rea would also name a song after his youngest daughter, Julia, on the album Espresso Logic (1993).

Rea told Q magazine that he wrote "Steel River" after returning to Middlesbrough "to see me father after me mother died, and [they] had knocked the whole place down. I'd been gone three years, hard touring in Europe, I literally went to drive somewhere that wasn't there. It was like a sci-fi movie. That's when I wrote Steel River. The Middlesbrough I knew, it's as if there was a war there 10 years ago." "Chisel Hill" refers to a house Rea bought in the vicinity of Roseberry Topping, which lies just south of Middlesbrough, and has a distinctive half-cone shaped summit. Rea says that the song "can make me cry quite easily... We'd reached the point where we'd bought a house, I had a child, we were happy. We'd kept the wolf from the door and things were okay... [I] wrote that song all in one quick go... whoever wrote that song back then, he must have been a really happy guy. Yeah, that song gets me." "You're looking back at yourself", he said, "remembering what you thought was going to happen, and then what actually happened... I definitely should have stayed in Chisel Hill, without a doubt!"

== Cover versions ==
The track "Stone" was covered by the Law on their self-titled album, with Rea on guitar. In 2000, "Josephine" was sampled by Superfunk for their song "Lucky Star", with Ron Carroll, although the samples come from another (shorter) version of the song, rather than the original album version.

== Track listing ==
All songs by Chris Rea

1. "Steel River" – 6:15
2. "Stainsby Girls" – 3:51
3. "Chisel Hill" – 4:03
4. "Josephine" – 4:26 (3:56 in later pressings)
5. "One Golden Rule" – 4:29
6. "All Summer Long" – 4:09
7. "Stone" – 4:23
8. "Shamrock Diaries" – 4:55
9. "Love Turns to Lies" – 4:11
10. "Hired Gun" – 8:03

== Singles ==
1. "Stainsby Girls" b/w "And When She Smiles", "Sunrise", "Dancing Shoes", "September Blue"
2. "Josephine" b/w "Josephine (Remix)", "Everytime It Rains"

== Personnel ==
=== Musicians ===
- Chris Rea – vocals, organ, synthesizers, guitars, slide guitar
- Kevin Leach – keyboards, grand piano, Rhodes
- Max Middleton – keyboards, grand piano, Rhodes
- Robert Ahwai – additional rhythm guitars
- Simon Nicol – additional rhythm guitars
- Eoghan O'Neill – bass
- Dave Mattacks – drums
- Adrian Rea – drums
- Martin Ditcham – percussion
- Mel Collins – saxophone
- Annie Whitehead – trombone
- The Sultanas (Ian Barnett, Donnie Hilstad, Jesse Lortz and Kimberly Morrison) – backing vocals

=== Production ===
- Chris Rea – producer
- David Richards – producer, engineer
- Barry Hammond – engineer
- Bil Smith – cover artwork
- Derek Ridgers – photography

== Charts ==
1985 chart performance for Shamrock Diaries
Chart (1985)	Peak position
Australian Albums (Kent Music Report)	41
Dutch Albums (Album Top 100)	3
German Albums (Offizielle Top 100)	12
Swedish Albums (Sverigetopplistan)	19
Swiss Albums (Schweizer Hitparade)	18
UK Albums (Official Charts)	15

2025 chart performance for Shamrock Diaries
Chart (2025)	Peak position
Hungarian Physical Albums (MAHASZ)	14

== Certifications ==
Certifications for Shamrock Diaries
Region	Certification	Certified units/sales
Germany (BVMI)	Gold	250,000^{^}
United Kingdom (BPI)	Silver	60,000^{^}
^{^} Shipments figures based on certification alone.
