= David Snell (musician) =

British harpist (born 1936)

David Snell (born 12 May 1936) is a British harpist, composer and conductor who has worked across a wide range of genres, from jazz, pop and soundtracks through to library music and classical concert works.

== Early career ==
Snell was born in Grantham, Lincolnshire and took his first piano lessons there from local teacher Frank Rawle. He played as a pianist with the local Jimmy Carr Orchestra before leaving Grantham for National Service in 1954 with the Royal Artillery Band. He then studied harp with Marie Goossens.

He began his professional career as a harpist with the Bournemouth Symphony Orchestra and later joined the orchestra of the Royal Opera House, while also performing as a freelance harpist for various orchestras and as a session musician.

== Session musician ==
As a jazz harpist he has worked with many jazz musicians (including John Dankworth, Tubby Hayes, Zoot Sims and Kenny Wheeler), and also on film, television and pop music sessions and projects, such as harp on The Incredible String Band's The Hangman's Beautiful Daughter, and the Chris Rea single Every Beat of My Heart. Richard Morton Jack has observed that Snell's composition 'Mode Moderne' on the Johnny Scott Quintet's 1967 LP Communication, on which he also performed, "surely inspired Van Morrison's Moondance." Snell featured in regular jazz and light music broadcasts as performer and conductor on BBC radio from the 1960s until the late 1980s.

== Classical music ==
Meanwhile Snell has maintained his links with the classical music world as conductor and composer. His 1999 CD Women Write Music with the Foundation Philharmonic Orchestra includes performances of works by Doreen Carwithen, Elizabeth Maconchy, Barbara Kolb and Nicola LeFanu. As a concert composer his own works include the Divertimento for Strings (premiered at the Wigmore Hall in 1976), and a Requiem (1996) as well as chamber music and songs for soprano and harp. His Harp Solo Blues has been set as a Grade 7 examination piece by Trinity College London.

== Library and film music ==
Snell has composed and performed extensively for the major library music companies, including KPM Music, Bruton Music, Parry Music, Ring Music (Germany) and Josef Weinberger. A characteristic example is Plucking the Strings from the Bruton library. He has conducted the London Symphony Orchestra, the Royal Philharmonic Orchestra and the Orchestre de Paris, and conducted film scores such as Sun Child (1988, his own music), and films with music composed by Rachel Portman, including Emma (1996), The Cider House Rules (1999), Chocolat (2000), Oliver Twist (2005) and Never Let Me Go (2010). He conducted the premiere recording of Return to the Centre of the Earth (1999) by Rick Wakeman and the London Symphony Orchestra's recording of the video game soundtrack Tomb Raider: The Angel of Darkness (2003).

== Selected discography ==
- John Dankworth: What the Dickens (1963)
- Johnny Keating: The Keating Sound (1964)
- David Snell: Harp and Soul (Columbia, 1966)
- Zoot Sims: Waiting Game (1966)
- Johnny Scott Quintet: Communication (Columbia EMI, 1967)
- David Snell: The Subtle Sound of David Snell (Decca, 1967)
- The Incredible String Band: The Hangman's Beautiful Daughter (1968)
- The Hawksworth/Snell Trio. Mosaic (De Wolfe, 1969)
- David Lindup And The Big Band: When The Saints Go (1970)
- David Snell: The Solo Harp (KPM, 1972)
- Brian Bennett's Collage: Misty (1973)
- Keith Mansfield/Alan Hawkshaw/David Snell: Big Business/Wind of Change (KPM, 1973)
- Richard Thompson: Henry the Human Fly (1974)
- David Snell: David Snell Plays Hits On A Harp (1974)
- Robert Palmer: Pressure Drop (1975)
- David Snell: On the Other Side of the Angels (Programme Music, 1975)
- Alan Parsons Project: Tales of Mystery and Imagination (1976)
- David Snell Quintet: Sounds Harpy (Decca, 1978)
- John Coleman/David Snell: Prestige (Bruton, 1984)
- David Snell: Sound Stage 17 (Amphonic, 1984)
- David Snell Trio: Pure Genius (1987)
- David Snell: Chamber Music for Harp (Divine Art, 2008)
