= On the Beach (Chris Rea song) =

1986 song by Chris Rea

Single by Chris Rea

from the album On the Beach (1986 version) and New Light Through Old Windows (1988 version)
- B-side: "If Anybody Asks You" (1986); "I'm Taking the Day Out" (1988)
- Released: May 1986
- Genre: Soft rock
- Length: 5:04 (album version); 4:20 (special remix); 6:02 (special extended remix)
- Label: Magnet (1986 release); WEA (1988 release)
- Songwriter: Chris Rea
- Producers: Chris Rea; David Richards (1986 version); Jon Kelly (1988 version)

Chris Rea singles chronology
"It's All Gone" (1986)	"On the Beach" (1986)	"Hello Friend" (1986)
"Que Sera" (1988)	"On the Beach (Summer '88)" (1988)	"I Can Hear Your Heartbeat" (1988)

Music video
- "On the Beach" on YouTube

"On the Beach" is a song by British singer-songwriter Chris Rea that was released in 1986, as the second single from his eighth studio album, On the Beach. It was written by Rea and produced by Rea and David Richards. "On the Beach" reached No. 57 in the United Kingdom in 1986, and also charted in France and the Netherlands.

In 1988, Rea re-recorded "On the Beach" for his album New Light Through Old Windows and released it as a single. Produced by Rea and Jon Kelly, it reached No. 12 in the UK and No. 18 in Ireland. In 1989, it reached No. 9 on the US Billboard Adult Contemporary chart.

== Background ==
"On the Beach" was inspired by the Spanish island Formentera off the coast of Ibiza. Speaking to Songfacts, Rea said, "That's where me and my wife became me and my wife. That's what it's about. Yeah, I was 'between the eyes of love.' It's a lovely island if ever you're in Europe."

== Critical reception ==
Upon its release, Roger Holland of Sounds called "On the Beach" a "bland and fraudulently sincere miasma". In a retrospective review of the On the Beach album, Rob Caldwell of AllMusic described the song as the "standout track", adding that the original version was "the most evocative, a little slower and more meditative than [the] others." He recommended the song further by selecting it as an AMG Pick Track. Mike DeGagne, in an AllMusic review of New Light Through Old Windows commented that the song, along with "Let's Dance", "represent a lean toward a more commercial sound."

== Track listing ==
=== Original release ===
7-inch single

1. "On the Beach (Special Remix)" – 4:20
2. "If Anybody Asks You" – 5:00

7-inch single (alternative release)

1. "On the Beach" – 5:03
2. "On the Beach (Special Remix)" – 4:20

2x 7-inch single (UK limited edition release)

1. "On the Beach (Special Remix)" – 4:20
2. "If Anybody Asks You" – 5:00
3. "Chris Rea Live" – 3:37 Live at the Hammersmith Odeon - London 2 May 1986
4. "Chris Rea Live" – 4:31 Live at the Hammersmith Odeon - London 2 May 1986

7-inch single (US release)

1. "On the Beach (Edit)" – 3:47
2. "Se Sequi" – 5:03

7-inch single (US promo)

1. "On the Beach (Edit)" – 3:47
2. "On the Beach (Edit)" – 3:47

12-inch single

1. "On the Beach (Special Extended Remix)" – 6:02
2. "If Anybody Asks You" – 5:00
3. "On the Beach (Special Remix)" – 4:20

12-inch single (Italian promo)

1. "On the Beach (Special Remix)" – 4:20
2. "If Anybody Asks You" – 5:00
3. "One Golden Rule" – 4:45
4. "Midnight Blue" – 6:28

=== 1988 release ===
7-inch single

1. "On the Beach Summer '88" – 3:45
2. "I'm Taking the Day Out" – 3:25

12-inch single

1. "On the Beach Summer '88" – 6:50
2. "I'm Taking the Day Out" – 3:25
3. "It's All Gone (Live in Montreux)" – 8:10

CD single

1. "On the Beach Summer '88" – 3:44
2. "I'm Taking the Day Out" – 3:23
3. "It's All Gone (Live in Montreux)" – 8:11
4. "September Blue" – 3:06

CD single (US promo)

1. "On the Beach (Edit)" – 3:47
2. "On the Beach (LP Version)" – 6:50

== Personnel ==
1986 version

- Chris Rea - vocals, instruments, producer
- Adrian Rea - Drums / Percussion
- David Richards - producer, mixing on "On the Beach"
- David Scavenger - mixing on "If Anybody Asks You"
- Ekkeheart Gurlitt - photography

1988 version

- Chris Rea - vocals, instruments, producer
- Jon Kelly - producer, engineer
- Justin Shirley-Smith - assistant engineer

== Charts ==
=== 1986 release ===
Chart (1986–1987)	Peak position
France (SNEP)	48
Netherlands (Dutch Top 40)	33
Netherlands (Single Top 100)	34
UK Singles (Official Charts)	57

Chart (2024)	Peak position
Japan Hot Overseas (Billboard Japan)	20

=== 1988 release ===
Chart (1988–1989)	Peak position
Europe (Eurochart Hot 100)	40
Ireland (IRMA)	18
UK Singles (Official Charts)	12
US Adult Contemporary (Billboard)	9

== York version ==
"O.T.B. (On the Beach)"
- German maxi-single cover artwork

Single by York

from the album Experience
- Released: 1999
- Length: 3:36 (radio mix)
- Label: Adrenalin
- Songwriter: Chris Rea
- Producer: CRW

York singles chronology
"Jastamba" (1998)	"O.T.B. (On the Beach)" (1999)	"The Fields of Love" (2000)

In 1999, German dance music group York sampled the guitar riff for their track "O.T.B. (On the Beach)", which was produced by Mauro Picotto under the name "CRW". In June 2000, the song debuted and peaked at No. 4 on the UK Singles Chart for two weeks and sold over 200,000 copies to earn a silver certification from the British Phonographic Industry (BPI). Rea played guitar with York for their performance of the track on Top of the Pops. He also stated on British radio that he had intended to go to Ibiza with York for live promotions but was unable due to a recent heart attack.

=== Track listings ===
German maxi-CD single

1. "O.T.B. (On the Beach)" (Vocal Radio Mix) – 3:36
2. "O.T.B. (On the Beach)" (Magic Marc's Radiomix) – 3:41
3. "O.T.B. (On the Beach)" (Milk & Sugar Radio Version) – 3:40
4. "O.T.B. (On the Beach)" (Hitch Hiker & Dumondt Radio Version) – 3:30
5. "O.T.B. (On the Beach)" (Eivissa@night.mix) – 6:36
6. "O.T.B. (On the Beach)" (Milk & Sugar's "Munich Is Burning" Club Mix) – 8:07
7. "O.T.B. (On the Beach)" (Hitch Hiker & Dumondt Club Mix) – 8:10

Italian CD single

1. "O.T.B. (On the Beach)" (Basic Connection Edit) – 3:18
2. "O.T.B. (On the Beach)" (Basic Connection Mix) – 6:40
3. "O.T.B. (On the Beach)" (Hitch Hiker & Dumondt Club Mix) – 8:10
4. "O.T.B. (On the Beach)" (Eivissa@Night.Mix) – 6:33

Belgian 12-inch single

A1. "O.T.B. (On the Beach)" (Milk & Sugar Club Mix) – 8:07
A2. "O.T.B. (On the Beach)" (CRW Mix) – 6:52
B1. "O.T.B. (On the Beach)" (Original Mix) – 7:13
B2. "O.T.B. (On the Beach)" (Hitch Hiker & Dumondt Club Mix) – 8:10

US 12-inch single

A1. "O.T.B. (On the Beach)" (CRW Mix) – 6:40
A2. "O.T.B. (On the Beach)" – 8:07
B1. "O.T.B. (On the Beach)" (Eivissa@Night Mix) – 6:36
B2. "O.T.B. (On the Beach)" (Hitch Hiker & Dumondt Club Mix) – 8:10

=== Charts ===
==== Weekly charts ====
Chart (1999–2000)	Peak position
Canada Dance/Urban (RPM)	30
Europe (Eurochart Hot 100)	18
Germany (GfK)	70
Ireland (IRMA)	10
Italy (FIMI)	43
Scottish Singles Sales (Official Charts)	3
UK Singles (Official Charts)	4
UK Dance (Official Charts)	1
US Dance Club Songs (Billboard)	23

==== Year-end charts ====
Chart (2000)	Position
Ireland (IRMA)	67
UK Singles (OCC)	74

=== Certifications ===
Region	Certification	Certified units/sales
United Kingdom (BPI)	Silver	200,000^{^}
^{^} Shipments figures based on certification alone.

=== Release history ===
Region	Date	Format(s)	Label(s)	Ref.
Germany	1999	CD	Adrenalin	
United Kingdom	29 May 2000	CD	Manifesto	
