= Let's Dance (Chris Rea song) =

1987 single by Chris Rea

Single by Chris Rea

from the album Dancing with Strangers
- B-side: "I Don't Care Anymore"
- Released: 18 May 1987
- Recorded: February 1987 (Montreux, Switzerland)
- Length: 4:07
- Label: Magnet
- Songwriter: Chris Rea
- Producers: Chris Rea; Stuart Eales

Chris Rea singles chronology
"Driving Home for Christmas" (1986)	"Let's Dance" (1987)	"Loving You Again" (1987)

Music video
- "Let's Dance (1987)" on YouTube

"Let's Dance" is a 1987 single by British singer-songwriter Chris Rea. The song first appeared in an early form as a B-side to the "It's All Gone" single in 1986 and was re-recorded for his 1987 album, Dancing with Strangers, serving as its lead single. "Let's Dance" peaked at No. 12 on the UK Singles Chart and No. 81 on the US Billboard Hot 100. In New Zealand, it reached No. 2 for three non-consecutive weeks, and it also peaked within the top 10 in Australia, Ireland, and South Africa.

In 1988, it was re-recorded again for the New Light Through Old Windows album. Another version of the song was re-released with new lyrics in 1997 by Middlesbrough Football Club, Rea's hometown football club, with the new lyrics provided by comedian Bob Mortimer.

== Track listings ==
7-inch single

A. "Let's Dance" – 3:52
B. "I Don't Care Anymore" – 2:08

UK CD and cassette single

1. "Let's Dance" – 3:52
2. "Let's Dance" (12-inch special remix) – 6:04
3. "Josephine" (extended French re-record) – 5:35
4. "I Don't Care Anymore" – 2:08

UK 12-inch single

A1. "Let's Dance" (The Remix) – 7:02
B1. "Josephine" (extended French re-record) – 5:35
B2. "Let's Dance" (7-inch version) – 3:52
B3. "I Don't Care Anymore" – 2:08

== Charts ==
=== Weekly charts ===
Chart (1987)	Peak position
Australia (Australian Music Report)	9
Europe (European Hot 100 Singles)	20
Ireland (IRMA)	5
Netherlands (Single Top 100)	56
New Zealand (Recorded Music NZ)	2
South Africa (Springbok Radio)	4
Switzerland (Schweizer Hitparade)	22
UK Singles (Official Charts)	12
US Billboard Hot 100	81
West Germany (GfK)	22

=== Year-end charts ===
Chart (1987)	Position
Australia (Australian Music Report)	40
New Zealand (RIANZ)	28
