= Let It Loose (Chris Rea song) =

Single by Chris Rea

from the album Water Sign
- B-side: "Urban Samurai"
- Released: 1983
- Length: 3:37; 5:45 (extended remix)
- Label: Magnet
- Songwriter(s): Chris Rea
- Producer(s): Chris Rea, Dave Richards

Chris Rea singles chronology
"Every Beat of My Heart" (1982)	"Let It Loose" (1983)	"I Can Hear Your Heartbeat" (1983)

"Let It Loose" is a song by British singer-songwriter Chris Rea, which was released in 1983 as the lead single from his fifth studio album Water Sign. The song was written by Rea, and produced by Rea and Dave Richards. "Let It Loose" reached No. 85 in the UK Singles Chart and remained in the Top 100 for four weeks.

== Critical reception ==
On its release, Simon Tebbutt of Record Mirror wrote, "With all the jibes about dire Rea, I wouldn't have thought 'Let It Loose' was a very wise choice for a title. Another silly synth dirge that goes snap, crackle and... plop!" In a retrospective review of Water Sign, Sharon Mawer of AllMusic noted the song's "driving rock beat". In a 2021 retrospective on Rea's "30 best tracks for the open road", Dig! picked "Let It Loose" as number 27 on the list. They noted the song's "80s synth beats" and Rea's "soft-spoken voice".

== Track listing ==
7" single

1. "Let It Loose" – 3:37
2. "Urban Samurai" – 4:31

7" single (French release)

1. "Let It Loose" – 3:37
2. "Hey You" – 4:00

7" single (UK, with special four-track sampler EP)

1. "Let It Loose" – 3:37
2. "Urban Samurai" – 4:31
3. "Fool If You Think It's Over" – 4:47
4. "The Closer You Get" – 3:31
5. "Diamonds" – 4:51
6. "Guitar Street" – 3:58

12" single

1. "Let It Loose" (Special Extended Remix) – 5:45
2. "Sierra Sierra" – 5:38
3. "Urban Samurai" – 4:31

12" single (UK, with special 7" four-track sampler EP)

1. "Let It Loose" (Special Extended Remix) – 5:45
2. "Sierra Sierra" – 5:38
3. "Urban Samurai" – 4:31
4. "Fool If You Think It's Over" – 4:47
5. "The Closer You Get" – 3:31
6. "Diamonds" – 4:51
7. "Guitar Street" – 3:58

12" single (French release)

1. "Let It Loose" (Special Extended Remix) – 5:45
2. "Hey You" – 4:00

== Personnel ==
Production

- Chris Rea, Dave Richards – producers of "Let It Lose", "Urban Samurai" and "Sierra Sierra"
- Gus Dudgeon – producer of "Fool If You Think It's Over", "The Closer You Get" and "Diamonds"
- Jon Kelly, Chris Rea – producers of "Guitar Street"

Other

- Mike Laye – photography

== Charts ==
Chart (1983)	Peak position
UK Singles (OCC)	85
