= Lucky Star (Superfunk song) =

Song recorded by Superfunk

Single by Superfunk featuring Ron Carroll

from the album Hold Up
- Released: 2000
- Genre: Electronic
- Label: Virgin
- Composer: Chris Rea

"Lucky Star" is a 2000 song by Marseilles group Superfunk. It was the group's breakout single and sold more than 500,000 units worldwide, reaching 42 on the UK Singles Chart. The song contains a sample of Chris Rea's "Josephine". It was re-released with a remix package.

== "Lucky Star" track listing ==
1. "Lucky Star" (4Da Radio Mix) 14:24
2. "Lucky Star" (4Da Club Mix) 25:21
3. "Lucky Star" (Ron Carroll Remix) 19:22
4. "Lucky Star" (David Vendetta Radio Edit) 33:42
5. "Lucky Star" (David Vendetta Remix) 58:35
6. "Lucky Star" (D.O.N.S Radio Edit) 13:31
7. "Lucky Star" (D.O.N.S Remix) 38:39
8. "Lucky Star" (Dim Chris Remix) 77:50
9. "Lucky Star" (Acappella) 94:30

== Charts ==
=== Weekly charts ===
Weekly chart performance for "Lucky Star"
Chart (2000)	Peak position
Belgium (Ultratop 50 Flanders)	5
Belgium (Ultratop 50 Wallonia)	1
France (SNEP)	3
French Airplay (SNEP)	1
Germany (GfK)	69
Italy (FIMI)	23
Italian Airplay (Music & Media)	10
Netherlands (Dutch Top 40)	26
Netherlands (Single Top 100)	24
Sweden (Sverigetopplistan)	34
Switzerland (Schweizer Hitparade)	20
UK Singles (OCC)	42

=== Year-end charts ===
Annual chart rankings for "Lucky Star"
Chart (2000)	Position
Belgium (Ultratop Flanders)	34
Belgium (Ultratop Wallonia)	23
Europe (Eurochart Hot 100)	33
Switzerland (Schweizer Hitparade)	94
