= Driving Home for Christmas =

1986 song written and composed by Chris Rea

- Original single release of first recording

Single by Chris Rea
- A-side: "Hello Friend" (Full version)
- Written: 1978
- Released: December 1986
- Recorded: 1986
- Genre: Pop rock, Christmas
- Length: 4:35
- Label: Magnet
- Songwriter: Chris Rea
- Producers: Rea; Stuart Eales

Chris Rea singles chronology
"Hello Friend" (1986)	"Driving Home for Christmas" (1986)	"Let's Dance" (1987)

Music video
- "Chris Rea - Driving Home for Christmas" (1986) on YouTube

"Driving Home for Christmas"

Single by Chris Rea

from the album New Light Through Old Windows
- B-side: "Footsteps in the Snow"
- Released: November 1988
- Recorded: 1988
- Genre: Pop rock, Christmas
- Length: 4:00
- Label: Magnet
- Songwriter: Chris Rea
- Producers: Rea; Jon Kelly

Chris Rea singles chronology
"Fool (If You Think It's Over) ('88 Remix)" (1988)	"Driving Home for Christmas" (1988)	"Working on It" (1989)

Lyric video
- "Driving Home For Christmas" on YouTube

"Driving Home for Christmas" is a Christmas song written and composed by the English singer-songwriter Chris Rea. The first version was originally released as the B-side to his single "Hello Friend" in 1986. In October 1988, a re-recorded version served as one of two new songs on Rea's first compilation album New Light Through Old Windows. It was issued as the fourth single from the album in November 1988, where it peaked at number 53 on the UK Singles Chart as the lead track of The Christmas EP.

Despite its original modest chart placement, and the fact Rea never performed it live on tour until 2014, the song has made a reappearance on the UK Singles Chart every year since 2007 when it peaked at No. 33, and is featured among the Top 10 Christmas singles. It reached a new peak of number 10 on the UK Singles Chart in 2021. The 2004 single version started to receive certifications by BPI only since 2014, raising from Silver to 4× Platinum by 2025.

In a UK-wide poll in December 2012, it was voted twelfth on the ITV television special The Nation's Favourite Christmas Song.

== Background ==
In interviews for the BBC Radio 4 programme Today in 2009, and The Guardian in 2016, Rea said he wrote "Driving Home for Christmas" many years before its first recording; this was in 1978 when Rea needed to get home to Middlesbrough from Abbey Road Studios in London. His wife had come down to drive him home in her Austin Mini to save money because it was cheaper to drive than travel by train. Rea was recently out of contract and the record company was unwilling to pay for the rail ticket. The inspiration for the song came as they were getting stuck in heavy traffic, while the snow was falling. He started looking at the other motorists, who "all looked so miserable. Jokingly, I started singing: "We're driving home for Christmas..." Then, whenever the streetlights shone inside the car, I started writing down lyrics". Rea said "Driving Home for Christmas" is a "car version of a carol", and that he wrote it for Van Morrison but did not manage to get it to him.

== Recording ==
Rea never planned to write a Christmas song. It was some years later, while testing pianos with keyboard player Max Middleton, Rea improvised a tune in a Count Basie style. Someone suggested he write it down, and he found that the melody fit the lyrics he had written for "Driving Home for Christmas". Initially, it was released as a B-side (to the 1986 single "Hello Friend") but afterwards was re-recorded with strings. Middleton played the distinctive jazzy intro, and together they produced a typical 1950s Christmas carol-type arrangement.

== Music video ==
A video clip was broadcast on 23 December 1986 by Dutch pop music TV show TopPop, interspersed with stock footage of the motorways around Hilversum.

In 2009, 21 years after the song was first released, an original video was made in aid of Shelter; all proceeds from digital download were donated to the charity. The celebrities who feature in the video are Mike Read, David Hamilton, Martin Shaw, Kristian Digby, Gail Porter, Lizzie Cundy, Ewen MacIntosh, Carol Decker, Giles Vickers-Jones, and Lionel Blair. On the project, Rea stated: "I wanted to do something special this Christmas and what better way than to help keep a roof over people's heads when they need it most – at Christmas. By teaming up with Shelter we can hopefully make a difference".

== First live tour performance (2014) ==
In the Guardian interview, Rea stated that he never played the song live until 2014 at Hammersmith Odeon; he recalls: "the gig was on 20 December, so the road crew kept badgering me to do it. I went, 'If I'm going to sing this fucking song, we're gonna do it properly.' So, we hired 12 snow cannons. When we started the song, you couldn't hear it for the noise of the crowd, and we let go with the machines. We put three feet of artificial snow in the stalls. The venue charged me £12,000 to clean it up".

== Critical reception ==
Upon its release as a single in 1988, David Giles of Record Mirror described "Driving Home for Christmas" as a "jaunty, happy song" with "the joys of the season and some lilting ripples of guitar".

== Track listings ==
12" single
No.	Title	Length
1.	"Driving Home for Christmas"	4:35
2.	"Hello Friend (Full version)"	4:46

Driving Home for Christmas (The Christmas EP): 7 inch, 1988
No.	Title	Length
1.	"Driving Home for Christmas"	4:00
2.	"Footsteps in the Snow"
3.	"Joys of Christmas"
4.	"Smile" (produced by Dave Richards)

CD single
No.	Title	Length
1.	"Driving Home for Christmas"	4:35
2.	"Hello Friend" (re-record)	4:21

== Chart performance ==
In recent years it charted as follows: In 2008 on Netherlands Digital Songs (No. 4), Euro Digital Tracks (No. 8), in 2009 on Norway Digital Songs (No. 3), on Billboard Japan Hot 100 in 2012 (No. 18) and 2014 (No. 23), while on Denmark Digital Songs in 2016 (No. 9) and 2017 (No. 5). In 2022, the song entered the top 10 of the UK Singles Chart for the first time at number 10.

=== Charts ===
==== Weekly charts ====
Weekly chart performance
Chart (1986–2025)	Peak position
Australia (ARIA)	26
Austria (Ö3 Austria Top 40)	3
Belgium (Ultratop 50 Flanders)	14
Belgium (Ultratop 50 Wallonia)	46
CIS Airplay (TopHit)	32
Croatian International Airplay (Top lista)	1
Czech Republic Airplay (ČNS IFPI)	99
Czech Republic Singles Digital (ČNS IFPI)	66
Denmark (Tracklisten)	4
Estonia Airplay (TopHit)	12
Finland (Suomen virallinen lista)	17
Finnish Airplay (Radiosoitto)	11
Germany (GfK)	3
Global 200 (Billboard)	27
Greece International Streaming (IFPI)	75
Hungary (Single Top 40)	5
Hungary (Stream Top 40)	17
Ireland (IRMA)	11
Italy (FIMI)	96
Japan Hot 100 (Billboard)	18
Kazakhstan Airplay (TopHit)	92
Latvia Airplay (LaIPA)	12
Latvia Streaming (DigiTop100)	40
Lithuania (AGATA)	22
Lithuania Airplay (TopHit)	10
Luxembourg Streaming (Billboard)	14
Malta Airplay (Radiomonitor)	9
Moldova Airplay (TopHit)	70
Netherlands (Single Top 100)	3
New Zealand (Recorded Music NZ)	22
Norway (VG-lista)	2
Poland (Polish Airplay Top 100)	6
Poland (Polish Streaming Top 100)	11
Portugal (AFP)	41
Romania Airplay (TopHit)	57
Russia Airplay (TopHit)	137
Scottish Singles Sales (Official Charts)	37
Slovakia Airplay (ČNS IFPI)	13
Slovakia Singles Digital (ČNS IFPI)	17
Slovenia Airplay (SloTop50)	1
Sweden (Sverigetopplistan)	5
Switzerland (Schweizer Hitparade)	10
UK Singles (Official Charts)	10
Ukraine Airplay (TopHit)	7

==== Monthly charts ====
Monthly chart performance
Chart (2023–2025)	Peak position
CIS Airplay (TopHit)	48
Estonian Airplay (TopHit)	47
Lithuanian Airplay (TopHit)	24
Romanian Airplay (TopHit)	60
Ukrainian Airplay (TopHit)	45

==== Year-end charts ====
1988 year-end chart performance
Chart (1988)	Position
Tokyo (Tokio Hot 100)	95

2023 year-end chart performance
Chart (2023)	Position
Germany (GfK)	94
Hungary (Single Top 40)	98

2024 year-end chart performance
Chart (2024)	Position
Germany (GfK)	91

2025 year-end chart performance
Chart (2025)	Position
Germany (GfK)	96

== Certifications ==
Certifications and sales
Region	Certification	Certified units/sales
Denmark (IFPI Danmark)	4× Platinum	360,000^{‡}
Germany (BVMI)	2× Platinum	1,200,000^{‡}
New Zealand (RMNZ)	Platinum	30,000^{‡}
Portugal (AFP)	Gold	20,000^{‡}
United Kingdom (BPI)	4× Platinum	2,400,000^{‡}
Streaming
Greece (IFPI Greece)	Gold	1,000,000^{†}
^{‡} Sales+streaming figures based on certification alone.^{†} Streaming-only figures based on certification alone.

== In popular culture ==
Singer and television presenter Stacey Solomon covered the song in 2011 and it was released on 18 December 2011 as her debut single. Originally intended to be used solely in commercials for supermarket chain Iceland and cabins, it was later released as a single due to popular demand, reaching number 27. The single was released on 18 December 2011 on iTunes with all proceeds going to Alzheimer's Research UK and children's hospice charity Together For Short Lives. She subsequently said that she was not disappointed that the single did not make it into the UK top 20.

It was used in Christmas commercials for supermarket chain Iceland in 1997, 1998 and 2011; the last featured a cover by Stacey Solomon. An alternative version of the single was released in Japan as part of an EP called Snow.

Chris Rea's version is used in the Season 2 Christmas special of the BBC series Gavin & Stacey, as the characters from Wales drive to Essex. One of the characters comments on his love of Rea's songs.

In December 2020, a joke about Dominic Cummings' journey to Durham during the coronavirus lockdown, which referenced the song in the punchline, was announced as the winner of UK TV channel Gold's annual "Christmas Cracker Joke" competition. The joke read: "What is Dominic Cummings' favourite Christmas song? 'Driving Home for Christmas'".
