= Wired to the Moon =

Studio album by Chris Rea
- Released: April 1984
- Recorded: August – December 1983
- Length: 41:55
- Label: Magnet
- Producer: Chris Rea; David Richards

Chris Rea chronology
Water Sign (1983)	Wired to the Moon (1984)	Shamrock Diaries (1985)

Music video
- "I Don't Know What It Is But I Love It (1984)" on YouTube

Professional ratings
Review scores
Source	Rating
AllMusic	3.5/5 stars

Wired to the Moon is the sixth studio album by British singer-songwriter Chris Rea, released in April 1984. The album reached No. 35 on the UK Albums Chart. Three singles were released: "I Don't Know What It Is But I Love It" peaked at No. 65 on the UK Singles Chart, "Touché d'Amour" reached No. 86, and "Ace of Hearts" peaked at No. 79. The latter was re-released in 1985 and climbed one position higher, to No. 78.

== Track listing ==
All songs by Chris Rea

1. "Bombollini" – 6:11
2. "Touché d'Amour" – 3:30
3. "Shine, Shine, Shine" – 4:04
4. "Mystery Man" – 3:22 (only on the German LP)
5. "Wired to the Moon" – 5:20
6. "Reasons" – 3:47
7. "I Don't Know What It Is But I Love It" – 3:35 (Cassette version includes the extended version 5:25)
8. "Ace of Hearts" – 4:29
9. "Holding Out" – 4:26
10. "Winning" – 6:33

== Personnel ==
=== Musicians ===
- Chris Rea – vocals (1, 3–10), keyboards, acoustic piano (1, 8–10), guitars (1–4, 6, 7, 9, 10), lead guitar (1–3, 5, 6, 8–10), bass guitar (1, 3, 4, 6, 7, 10), marimba (1, 4), accordion (2), fretless bass (8)
- David Richards – synthesizers (4, 6, 7)
- Jerry Stevenson – guitars (2, 4, 6, 8), acoustic guitars (8)
- Kevin Powell – bass guitar (2, 5, 8, 9)
- Jeff Seopardie – drums, percussion (1–4), brushes (8)

=== Production ===
- Chris Rea – producer
- David Richards – producer, engineer
- John Dent – mastering
- Jo Mirowski – art direction, design

== Singles ==
1. "I Don't Know What It Is (But I Love It)" b/w "Mystery Man"
2. "Touché d'amour (Remix)" b/w "Touché d'amour (Instrumental)"
3. "Bombollini (Edit)" b/w "True Love"
4. "Ace of Hearts (Remix)" b/w "I Can Hear Your Heartbeat (Live)", "True Love", "From Love to Love", "Smile"
5. "Wired to the Moon" b/w "True Love"

== Charts ==
Chart performance for Wired to the Moon
Chart (1984)	Peak position
Dutch Albums (Album Top 100)	25
German Albums (Offizielle Top 100)	17
Norwegian Albums (VG-lista)	16
Swedish Albums (Sverigetopplistan)	13
UK Albums (OCC)	35
