= It's All Gone =

Single by Chris Rea

from the album On the Beach
- B-side: "Bless Them All"
- Released: 3 March 1986
- Length: 7:28 (album version); 4:10 (single version); 6:46 (extended version)
- Label: Magnet
- Songwriter: Chris Rea
- Producers: Chris Rea; David Richards

Chris Rea singles chronology
"Ace of Hearts" (1985)	"It's All Gone" (1986)	"On the Beach" (1986)

Music video
- "It's All Gone (1986)" on YouTube

"It's All Gone" is a song by British singer-songwriter Chris Rea, released on 3 March 1986 as the lead single from his eighth studio album, On the Beach. It was written by Rea, and produced by Rea and David Richards. "It's All Gone" reached No. 69 in the UK Singles Chart and remained in the Top 100 for four weeks.

== Music video ==
The song's music video was directed by Tony van den Ende. Speaking to Guitarist in 1986 about the upcoming video shoot, Rea revealed: "It's going to be a Spaghetti western! The band doesn't look like Depeche Mode and to dress us up would make us look absolutely stupid. As we already look as if we had just crawled from underneath the saloon, I suggested we make a video that exaggerates the fact!"

== Critical reception ==
On its release, Music & Media picked "It's All Gone" as a "sure hit" and described it as a "medium-paced rock song". In a review of On the Beach, Robin Denselow of The Guardian commented: "It's a classy album, but for the British market he might have included more up-tempo pieces like "It's All Gone", a moodily stirring song of decay."

== Track listing ==
7" single

1. "It's All Gone" – 4:10
2. "Bless Them All" – 2:28

7" single (UK special double pack)

1. "It's All Gone" – 4:10
2. "Bless Them All" – 2:28
3. "Stainsby Girls" – 3:50
4. "And When She Smiles" – 3:12

12" single

1. "It's All Gone" – 6:46
2. "Crack That Mould" – 4:41
3. "Bless Them All" – 2:28

== Personnel ==
Production

- Chris Rea - producer
- David Richards - producer, mixing

== Charts ==
Chart (1986)	Peak position
Belgian Singles Chart (V)	32
Dutch Singles Chart	37
Irish Singles Chart	14
UK Singles Chart	69
