= Superfunk (band) =

French electronic dance band

Superfunk is a French electronic dance music group founded in 1998. They are leading Marseille artists along with DJ Jack de Marseille and DJ Fafa Monteco. Their breakout single in 2000 was "Lucky Star" which sampled Chris Rea and featured Ron Carroll.

On the 12th of August 2020, Stéphane Bonan a.k.a. Stéphane B died of cancer.
