= Dancing with Strangers =

Dancing With Strangers

Studio album by Chris Rea
- Released: 14 September 1987
- Recorded: February – June 1987
- Studios: Mountain Studios (Montreux, Switzerland); Studio Miraval (Le Val, France); Hartmann Digital (Bavaria, Germany)
- Genre: Album-oriented rock
- Length: 49.16 (58:54 on cd with bonus tracks)
- Labels: Magnet; Motown (US)
- Producer: Chris Rea

Chris Rea chronology
On the Beach (1986)	Dancing With Strangers (1987)	New Light Through Old Windows (1988)

Singles from Dancing with Strangers
- 1. "Let's Dance" Released: 18 May 1987; 2. "Loving You Again" Released: 17 August 1987; 3. "Joys of Christmas" Released: 23 November 1987

Professional ratings
Review scores
Source	Rating
Record Mirror	2/5 stars
Smash Hits	7/10

Dancing with Strangers is the ninth studio album by British singer-songwriter Chris Rea, released in September 1987. It became Rea's first major success in the UK, peaking at No. 2 behind Michael Jackson's Bad, and spent 46 weeks in the charts before going platinum. The album entered the Top 10 in six other European countries, and topped the chart in New Zealand.

"Let's Dance" was released as the first single and peaked at No. 12 in the UK, and climbed to No. 2 in New Zealand. It was followed by "Loving You Again", "Joys of Christmas" and "Que Sera". The album features renowned Irish piper Davy Spillane.

== Production ==
Rea had put a multi-track recording desk in his garage, and "made the whole album with three microphones. Nobody heard it, nobody witnessed it", he said. "It was just me having fun." It was "the first time Rea had demoed and partly recorded the album at home", which "gave him more control and helped cement his vision".

Despite the lead single's success, subsequent singles fared relatively poorly in the UK charts, with "Loving You Again" reaching No. 47, "Joys of Christmas" making it to No. 67 and "Que Sera" reaching No. 73. The latter shares a verse taken from an earlier song from the eponymous Chris Rea, called "When You Know Your Love Has Died."

Dancing With Strangers, along with four other albums from Rea's commercial peak, was remastered and reissued as a double album, with the first disc consisting of the original LP, and the second containing bonus material including singles, along with alternative and live versions.

== Track listing ==
All songs by Chris Rea.

1. "Joys of Christmas" – 5:15
2. "I Can't Dance to That" – 4:19
3. "Windy Town" – 4:25
4. "Gonna Buy a Hat" – 4:25
5. "Curse of the Traveller" – 6:26
6. "Let's Dance" – 4:07
7. "Que Sera" – 5:23
8. "Josie's Tune" – 2:19
9. "Loving You Again" – 5:40
10. "That Girl of Mine" – 3:41
11. "September Blue" – 3:09
12. "I Don't Care Any More" – 2:10
13. "Donahue's Broken Wheel" – 3:02
14. "Danielle's Breakfast" – 4:33

Note

- Tracks 12–14 are bonus tracks not available on the initial LP release.

== Personnel ==
=== Musicians ===
- Chris Rea – vocals, guitar (1, 2, 6), accordion (1, 4, 10), harmonica (1, 2, 7), brass (1, 4, 6, 7, 9), acoustic guitar (3), rhythm guitar (3), banjo (3), slide guitar (2, 4, 10), all other guitars (5, 7), keyboards (6, 7), acoustic piano (7), all other instruments (8), all guitars (9), strings (9), lead guitar (10), all instruments (11–14)
- Kevin Leach – acoustic piano (2, 3, 5, 9, 10), organ (2, 5, 7), Hammond organ (4)
- Jerry Donahue – lead guitar (3, 4, 7), acoustic guitar (3), rhythm guitar (5, 10)
- Eoghan O'Neill – bass (1–7, 9, 10), drums (1), percussion (1)
- Martin Ditcham – drums (2–7, 9, 10), percussion (2, 3, 5–7, 9, 10)
- Davy Spillane – Uilleann pipes (3, 5, 8, 10), low whistle (3, 5, 8, 10)

=== Production ===
- Chris Rea – producer, mixing
- Stewart Eales – engineer
- Jean Jacques Lemoine – engineer
- Justin Shirley-Smith – engineer
- Jon Kelly – mixing
- Willie Grimston – coordination
- Mark Entwistle – cover illustration
- Shoot That Tiger! – sleeve design
- Jim Beach – management
- Paul Lilly – management

== Charts ==
=== Weekly charts ===
Chart (1987–88)	Peak position
Australian Albums (Kent Music Report)	7
Austrian Albums (Ö3 Austria)	13
Dutch Albums (Album Top 100)	7
European Albums (Music & Media)	8
French Albums (IFOP)	14
German Albums (Offizielle Top 100)	5
New Zealand Albums (RMNZ)	1
Norwegian Albums (VG-lista)	6
Swedish Albums (Sverigetopplistan)	7
Swiss Albums (Schweizer Hitparade)	7
UK Albums (Official Charts)	2

Chart (2024)	Peak position
German Pop Albums (Offizielle Top 100)	17

=== Year-end charts ===
Chart (1987)	Position
Dutch Albums (Album Top 100)	85
European Albums (Music & Media)	68
New Zealand Albums (RMNZ)	27
Chart (1988)	Position
German Albums (Offizielle Top 100)	68

== Certifications ==
Region	Certification	Certified units/sales
Australia	—	75,000
France (SNEP)	Gold	100,000^{*}
Germany (BVMI)	Gold	250,000^{^}
New Zealand (RMNZ)	Gold	7,500^{^}
United Kingdom (BPI)	Platinum	300,000^{^}
^{*} Sales figures based on certification alone.^{^} Shipments figures based on certification alone.
