= Loving You Again =

Single by Chris Rea

from the album Dancing with Strangers
- B-side: "Donahue's Broken Wheel"
- Released: 17 August 1987
- Length: 5:39 (album version); 4:26 (single version)
- Label: Magnet
- Songwriter: Chris Rea
- Producer: Chris Rea

Chris Rea singles chronology
"Let's Dance" (1987)	"Loving You Again" (1987)	"Joys of Christmas" (1987)

"Loving You Again" is a song by British singer-songwriter Chris Rea, released on 17 August 1987 as the second single from his ninth studio album, Dancing with Strangers. The song was written and produced by Rea. "Loving You Again" reached No. 47 in the UK Singles Chart and remained in the Top 100 for four weeks.

== Critical reception ==
Upon its release, Paul Massey of the Aberdeen Evening Express commented, "Rea slips effortlessly into a relaxed, mellow ballad. Should be a huge hit." Selina Webb of the Bucks Advertiser awarded three out of five stars and wrote, "'Loving You Again' is all about summer, rekindled love, flowers blowing in the wind. You know the sort of thing. The instrumentation is pleasant, the husky voice is pleasant, even the sleeve is pleasant. A watercolour. Washed out. Laid back. If this is you, you'll love it."

In a review of Dancing with Strangers, Helen Metella of the Edmonton Journal wrote, "From the opening track to the rapturous affirmation of commitment in 'Loving You Again', Rea sustains a deep caring for people without ever encroaching on the entertainment value of spirited soft-rock." In a 2021 retrospective on Rea's "30 best tracks for the open road", Dig! picked "Loving You Again" as number 17 on the list. They noted the "not-so-subtle demonstration of soulful brass and sentimental lyricism" and the "influence of a more soul-based, Motown-inspired sound". They also described it as a "notable highlight" from Dancing with Strangers.

== Track listing ==
7" single

1. "Loving You Again" – 4:26
2. "Donahue's Broken Wheel" – 3:00

7" single (Japanese release)

1. "Loving You Again" – 4:26
2. "I Don't Care Anymore" – 2:12

12" single

1. "Loving You Again" – 5:40
2. "Donahue's Broken Wheel" – 3:00
3. "Danielle's Breakfast" – 4:35

== Personnel ==
Loving You Again

- Chris Rea - vocals, guitar, strings, brass
- Kevin Leach - piano
- Eoghan O'Neill - bass
- Martin Ditcham - drums, percussion

Production

- Chris Rea - producer, mixing
- Jon Kelly - mixing
- Stuart Eales - engineer

Other

- Mark Entwisle - cover illustration

== Charts ==
=== Weekly charts ===
Chart (1987)	Peak position
Australia (Kent Music Report)	75
Belgium (Ultratop 50 Flanders)	35
Ireland (IRMA)	25
Italy Airplay (Music & Media)	10
Netherlands (Dutch Top 40)	27
Netherlands (Single Top 100)	33
UK Singles (OCC)	47
West Germany (GfK)	43
