= The Road to Hell =

Studio album by Chris Rea
- Released: 30 October 1989
- Recorded: March – July 1989
- Studios: Miraval Studios, France
- Genres: Blues rock; soft rock; pop rock
- Length: 50:53
- Labels: WEA; Atco; Magnet
- Producers: Jon Kelly; Chris Rea

Chris Rea chronology
New Light Through Old Windows (1988)	The Road to Hell (1989)	Auberge (1991)

Singles from The Road to Hell
- 1. "The Road to Hell" Released: 2 October 1989; 2. "That's What They Always Say" Released: 27 November 1989; 3. "Tell Me There's a Heaven" Released: 29 January 1990; 4. "Texas" Released: 23 April 1990

Professional ratings
Review scores
Source	Rating
AllMusic	4.5/5 stars
New Musical Express	4/10

The Road to Hell is the tenth studio album by British singer-songwriter Chris Rea, released in October 1989. Coming on the back of several strongly performing releases, it is Rea's most successful studio album, and topped the UK Albums Chart for three weeks. Hailed as a "modern masterpiece", it was certified 6× Platinum by BPI in 2004. The album demonstrates a thematic cohesion previously absent from Rea's work, with the majority of the tracks containing strong elements of social commentary, addressing alienation, violence and redemption. The second part of the two-part title track, "The Road to Hell (Pt. 2)", is one of Rea's most famous songs, and was his first UK Top 10 single.

== Production ==
The album built on the upswing Rea had experienced in the previous few years, starting with a surge of popularity in Ireland. "Without the Irish and Shamrock Diaries there would have been no Road To Hell," Rea said. He had a lot of trouble with the album arising out of the attitude of his record company, and he "recorded the next album – Auberge – before, as an agreement with Warner Brothers. So if Road To Hell didn’t work – and they said it won't – we would jump straight away to Auberge and forget about it. Of course, the beginning to Road To Hell is a gospel blues thing. Warner Brothers went, ‘This is going to be over in five minutes’. But I did stand me ground, and it went No.1".

== Songs ==
Throughout the album there are repeated references to increasing social dissolution and rising violence, including riots, murder and their irresponsible depiction on television news ("You Must Be Evil"), and "the perverted fear of violence" on city streets ("The Road to Hell (Part 2"), where "it's all gone crazy" amid fears that "someone's gonna get killed out there" ("Texas"). Rea also targets industrial polluters' destruction of rivers (which "boil" with "poison"), and Thatcherism (which he also criticised on Shamrock Diaries' track "Steel River"), dismissing notions of an "upwardly mobile freeway", or that promises will be delivered on ("That's What They Always Say"). A sense of suffocating doom suffuses the title track. Rea cries "We gotta get outta here!" ("Texas") and "I'm getting out!" ("That's What They Always Say"), and struggles to find an escape in "Texas" and "Looking for a Rainbow". A prominent theme is the impact all of this is having on his daughter, who was six at the time ("You Must Be Evil", "Tell Me There's a Heaven").

In an interview for the deluxe edition of the album (2019), Rea said "You Must Be Evil" was inspired by a journalistic friend of his recounting that a report on someone having been necklaced in riots in South Africa would only make the television news if footage of the horrific event was obtained. "You start to see news as pornography," Rea said. "'If we have something horrible, it's news!'... And I hate it, to this day". He recounts how his daughter saw the television report, and how his father-in-law tried to console her by saying that there is a heaven, which prompted Rea to write the song "Tell Me There's a Heaven", which was subsequently used in a 1991 public information film for the NSPCC. Over the years, "Texas" has been played on classic rock/AOR radio stations in Texas, and is sometimes played as background music before Texas Rangers baseball games at Rangers Ballpark in Arlington. "Daytona" is about the Ferrari 365 GTB/4 Daytona (Rea races a different model Ferrari), in which he sings about the car metaphorically, with the engine and tyre noise from the car fading out toward the end of the song.

== Cover art ==
The Leisure Process was commissioned to produce the artwork for the album cover by Max Hole. Creative Director John Carver personally handled the project, and commissioned and art directed the illustrator, Adrian Chesterman. Chesterman, was also responsible for creating cover art for, amongst others, Motörhead's 1979 Bomber album.

== Track listing ==
All tracks are written by Chris Rea.

Original album
No.	Title	Length
1.	"The Road to Hell (Part 1)"	4:52
2.	"The Road to Hell (Part 2)"	4:32
3.	"You Must Be Evil"	4:23
4.	"Texas"	5:12
5.	"Looking for a Rainbow"	8:02
6.	"Your Warm and Tender Love"	4:33
7.	"Daytona"	5:07
8.	"That's What They Always Say"	4:29
9.	"I Just Wanna Be with You"	3:41
10.	"Tell Me There's a Heaven"	6:06
Total length:		50:58

In 2019 the album, along with others in Rea's back catalogue, was remastered and reissued with a second CD of B-Sides, remixes and live tracks.

2019 remaster bonus disc
No.	Title	Length
1.	"He Should Know Better" (B-Side of Road To Hell single)	4:38
2.	"That's What They Always Say" (Rainbow Mix)	6:41
3.	"1975" (B-Side of That's What They Always Say single)	4:47
4.	"The Road To Hell Parts 1 & 2" (Live At Wembley Arena March 1990)	6:59
5.	"Working On It" (Live At Wembley Arena March 1990)	6:26
6.	"Let's Dance" (Live At Wembley Arena March 1990)	7:34
7.	"Daytona" (Live At Birmingham NEC November 1991)	6:36
8.	"Working On It" (Extended Mix)	5:56
9.	"Josephine" (US Version from New Light Through Old Windows)	4:16
10.	"Let's Dance" (from New Light Through Old Windows)	4:15
11.	"You Must Be Evil" (Live In Stuttgart 1991)	4:36
12.	"I Can Hear Your Heartbeat" (from New Light Through Old Windows)	3:25
13.	"Working On It" (from New Light Through Old Windows)	4:26
Total length:		70:38

== Personnel ==
- Chris Rea – vocals, keyboards, guitars
- Kevin Leach – keyboards
- Max Middleton – acoustic piano, Fender Rhodes, string arrangements
- Robert Ahwai – guitars
- Eoghan O'Neill – bass
- Martin Ditcham – drums, percussion
- Gavyn Wright – concertmaster and conductor
- Karen Boddington – additional vocals
- Carol Kenyon – additional vocals
- Linda Taylor – additional vocals

=== Production ===
- Chris Rea – producer
- Jon Kelly – producer
- Neil Amor – engineer
- Diane BJ Koné – engineer
- Willie Grimston – coordinator
- The Leisure Process – artwork, sleeve design
- Jim Beach – management
- John Knowles – management
- Paul Lilly – management

== Charts ==
Weekly chart performance for The Road to Hell by Chris Rea
Chart (1989–1990)	Peak position
Australian Albums (ARIA)	35
Austrian Albums (Ö3 Austria)	2
Canada Top Albums/CDs (RPM)	37
Dutch Albums (Album Top 100)	43
German Albums (Offizielle Top 100)	3
Hungarian Albums (MAHASZ)	12
New Zealand Albums (RMNZ)	33
Norwegian Albums (VG-lista)	3
Swedish Albums (Sverigetopplistan)	2
Swiss Albums (Schweizer Hitparade)	6
UK Albums (Official Charts)	1
US Billboard 200	107
Chart (1995)	Peak position
Scottish Albums (Official Charts)	37

1989 year-end chart performance for The Road to Hell by Chris Rea
Chart (1989)	Position
European Albums (Music & Media)	92

1990 year-end chart performance for The Road to Hell by Chris Rea
Chart (1990)	Position
Austrian Albums (Ö3 Austria)	13
European Albums (Music & Media)	13
German Albums (Offizielle Top 100)	14
Swiss Albums (Schweizer Hitparade)	17

== Certifications ==
Region	Certification	Certified units/sales
Austria (IFPI Austria)	Platinum	50,000^{*}
Canada (Music Canada)	Gold	50,000^{^}
Finland (Musiikkituottajat)	Gold	45,000
France (SNEP)	Platinum	300,000^{*}
Germany (BVMI)	3× Gold	750,000^{^}
Switzerland (IFPI Switzerland)	Platinum	50,000^{^}
United Kingdom (BPI)	6× Platinum	1,800,000^{^}
^{*} Sales figures based on certification alone.^{^} Shipments figures based on certification alone.
