= Working on It =

Single by Chris Rea

from the album New Light Through Old Windows
- B-side: "One Golden Rule"; "Loving You Again (Live Version)"
- Released: 30 January 1989
- Length: 3:47 (US edit); 4:24
- Label: WEA; Geffen (US)
- Songwriter: Chris Rea
- Producers: Chris Rea; Jon Kelly

Chris Rea singles chronology
"Driving Home for Christmas" (1988)	"Working on It" (1989)	"The Road to Hell" (1989)

Music video
- "Working On It (Live TV 6-7-1989)" on YouTube

"Working on It" is a song by British singer-songwriter Chris Rea, released on 30 January 1989 as the fifth and final single from his compilation album, New Light Through Old Windows (1988). It was written by Rea, and produced by Rea and Jon Kelly. "Working on It" reached No. 53 in the UK and No. 73 on the US Billboard Hot 100. It also topped the Billboard Mainstream Rock chart.

== Critical reception ==
Upon release, Billboard listed the song as a recommended pop single and commented: "Top-five hit at album rock shows Rea's new label affiliation to be a smart career move. Straight-ahead, four-on-the-floor power rock could find a home at pop outlets as well." The Philadelphia Inquirer commented that the song "deserve[s] hit status".

== Track listing ==
7" single (US release)

1. "Working on It" – 3:47
2. "Loving You Again" (Live Version) – 5:20

7" single (UK/European release)

1. "Working on It" – 4:24
2. "One Golden Rule" – 4:29

7" single (Australian release)

1. "Working on It" – 4:24
2. "Driving Home for Christmas" – 3:58

7" single (US promo)

1. "Working on It" – 3:47
2. "Working on It" – 3:47

12" single (UK/European release)

1. "Working on It" (Extended Mix) – 5:55
2. "One Golden Rule" – 4:29

Cassette single

1. "Working on It" (Edit) – 3:47
2. "Loving You Again" (Live Version) – 5:20

CD single (German release)

1. "Working on It" – 4:25
2. "Working on It" (Extended Mix) – 5:55
3. "One Golden Rule" – 4:30
4. "Stainsby Girls" – 4:07

CD single (US release)

1. "Working on It" (LP Version) - 4:24

== Chart performance ==
Chart (1989)	Peak position
UK Singles Chart	53
US Billboard Hot 100	73
US Billboard Mainstream Rock Songs	1

== Personnel ==
- Chris Rea - vocals, instruments, producer
- Jon Kelly - producer
- Justin Shirley-Smith - engineer
- Paul Lilly, Danny Hyde - mixing on "Loving You Again (Live Version)"
- Chris Rea, David Richards - producers of "One Golden Rule"

Other

- Kav Deluxe - design (US sleeve)
- Elizabeth Brady - illustration (US sleeve)
- Greg Jakobek - illustration (UK/European sleeve)
