= Villages of Khash Rod =

Villages of the Khash Rod district, Afghanistan

The Khash Rod District is one of Nimroz province districts, which located in the east of Zaranj city, the provincial capital of Nimroz province. Per Central Statistics Office's information there were 40 villages in Khash Rod sub district in 1975.

After the creation of a new temporary district in 2007 called Delaram and separation it from Khash Rod District, some villages have been included in Delaram.

== List of Khash Rod district's villages ==
English Name - Local Name		Coordination	Extra
1. Dewalak	دیوالک	SE	
2. Kesht/ Khesht	کشت/ خشت	SE	
3. Burj	برج	SE	
4. Kakul Pada (Kakul Para); Ghori Bag	کاکل پده (کاکل پره): غوری بگ	E	
5. Malmal Sar; Karga; Qala-i-Surkhak; Gala Gad; Pay Namak; Bala Sar; Mareez	ململ سر: کارگه; قلعه سرخک; گله گد; پای نمک; بالا سر; مریض	e	
6. Razi Balochi; Kochnai Razi	رضی بلوچی: کوچنی رضی	W	
7. Kach-i Satar	کچ ستار	E	This village was added to Delaram after the creation of temporary Delaram District.
8. Minar; Kharaba Minar	منار: خرابه منار	E	
9. Rakeen	راکین	E	This village was added to Delaram after the creation of temporary Delaram District.
10. Torghondi	تورغوندی	SE	
11. Koh Talak	کوه تلک	2001-2005	E
12. Khwaja Mard/ Khwaja Muroowat	خواجه مرد/ خواجه مروت	E	This village was added to Delaram after the creation of temporary Delaram district.
13. Dehmazang	دهمزنگ	E	This village was added to Delaram after the creation of temporary Delaram district.
14. Astawi	استوی	E	This village was added to Delaram after the creation of temporary Delaram district.
15. GawMeshi; Qala-i Delaram	گاومیشی: قلعه دلارام	E	This village was added to Delaram after the creation of temporary Delaram district.
16. Angar Abad (Dangar Abad	انگر آباد (دنگر آباد)	E	This village was added to Delaram after the creation of temporary Delaram district.
17. Qalagi; Pozagi	قلعه گی: پوزه گی	E	This village was added to Delaram after the creation of temporary Delaram district.
18. Shish Aba; Qarya-i Yaqoob	شش آبه: قریه یعقوب	W	
19. Qala-i Nau	قلعه نو	W	This village divided into two villages: 1. Qala-i Nau; 2. Mazad village
20. Lukhi	لوخی	S	
21. Khash	خاش	SW	
22. Poshta-i Hasan	پشته حسن	E	
23. Garoo (Geraw)	گرو (گیرو)	SE	
24. Qarya-i Razi (Loy Radzi)	قریه رضی (لوی رضی )	SW	
25. Qarya-i Mohammad Abad	قریه محمد آباد	E	
26. Soofan Sailla	صوفان سیله	E	
27. Landai	لندی	SE	
28. Cha-i Moosa	چاه موسی	SE	
29. Shorli Gara	شورلی گره	N	
30. Nawi Laghdi	نوی لغدی	SE	
31. Zari	زری	-	
32. Jove-i Arab	جوی عرب	-	
33. Neelan or Nehlan	نیلان یا نهلان	-	
34. Kuniaj	خونیا	W	
