= Razi Balochi =

Razay Balochi رزی بلۏچی Razai Balochi (Persian: رضی بلوچی)
- Village
- Location in Afghanistan
- Coordinates: 31°27′51″N 62°41′58″E
- Country: Afghanistan
- Province: Nimruz Province
- District: Khash Rod district
- Elevation: 564 m (1,850 ft)

Population (2023)
  - Total: 2,000
- Time zone: UTC+4:30
- Main languages: Brahui, Pashto, Balochi and Dari

The Razay Balochi (Balochi: رزی بلۏچی, Persian: رضی بلوچی), is a village in Khash Rod district of Nimroz Province, in western Afghanistan. This village located on the left bank of the Khash Rud River and about 5 km east of Ghorghori city, the district capital of Khash Rod.

It lies to the east of the Kher Abad/ Ghurghuri city, west of Khash village, south of Khash River/ Shishaba village and north of Razi Afghani. The population of Razi Balochi village in 1975 was 67 families This village has a primary school and called: Razay Primary School (Persian: ابتدایه ذکوررزی بلوچی) .

== See also ==
- Villages of Khash Rod
