= Mazad village =

Mazad مازات Mazad (Persian: مازاد)
- Village
- Location in Afghanistan
- Coordinates: 31°32′44.6274″N 62°44′5.136″E
- Country: Afghanistan
- Province: Nimruz Province
- District: Khash Rod district
- Elevation: 573 m (1,880 ft)

Population (2023)
  - Total: 4,000
- Time zone: UTC+4:30
- Main languages: Balochi

The Mazad (Balochi: مازات, Persian: مازاد), also called Mazad-i Qala-i Nau (Persian: مازاد قلعه نو) is a village in Khash Rod district of Nimroz Province, in western Afghanistan. This village located on the right bank of the Khash Rud River and about 5 miles north of Khash village.

This village was part of Qala-i Nau and in 1993 separated from Qala-i Nau village, and now this village is big and populated than Qala-i Nau village. This village has a primary school and called: Mazad-i Qala-i Naw Primary School.

== See also ==
- Uzbakzai
- Qala-i Nau
