= Lukhi =

Lukhi (Persian: لوخي) may refer to:

- Lukhi, Fariman, Razavi Khorasan Province, Iran
- Lukhi, Khash Rod, Nimroz Province, Afghanistan
- Lukhi, Qalandarabad, Razavi Khorasan Province, Iran
