= Independent Inquiry relating to Afghanistan (United Kingdom) =

UK public inquiry

- Date: 22 March 2023 – (in progress)
- Location: London, United Kingdom
- Also known as: Afghan Unlawful Killing inquiry
- Participants: Charles Haddon-Cave (chair)
- Website: www.iia.independent-inquiry.uk

The Independent Inquiry relating to Afghanistan is a 2023 British public inquiry into extrajudicial killings that took place in Afghanistan between 2010 and 2013, during the War in Afghanistan.

== History ==
The UK Government's plan to hold the inquiry was initially announced by Defence Secretary Ben Wallace in December 2022. It followed a BBC Panorama investigation that reported that British special forces killed 54 Afghan detainees in suspicious circumstances during their tours of Afghanistan.

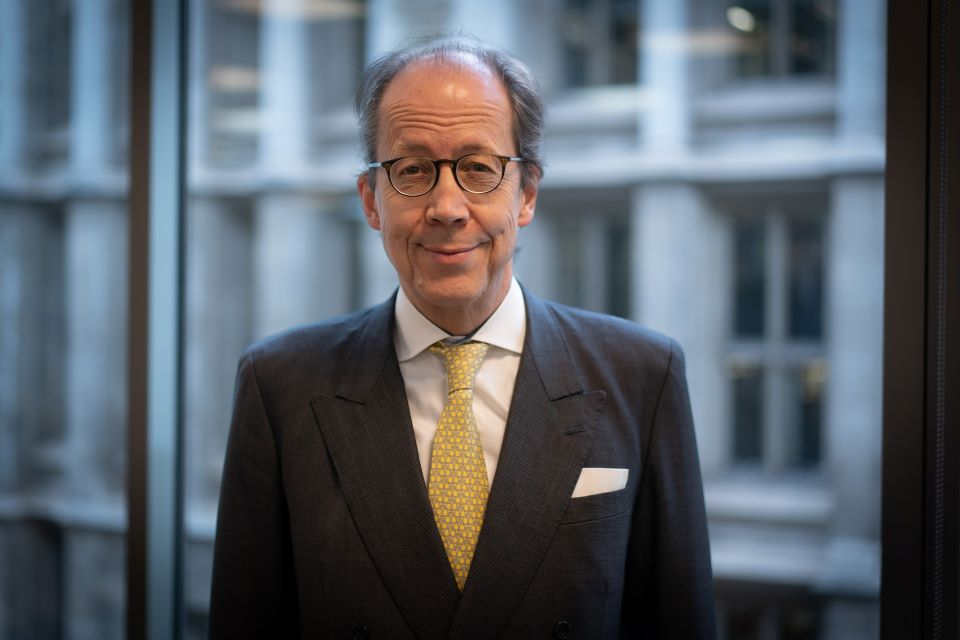
Charles Haddon-Cave in 2021

The inquiry was launched on 22 March 2023 and is chaired by judge Charles Haddon-Cave.

== Inquiry ==
The inquiry centres around the activities of British special forces deployed in Afghanistan. The inquiry planned to focus on night-time raids, known as Deliberate Detention Operations, including the 2012 Shesh Aba raid by British armed forces. Terms of reference included investigating the alleged cover-ups of the fatal incidents.

Law firm Leigh Day represents families of the bereaved; Brian Altman represents the Ministry of Defence.

The judge, Charles Haddon-Cave, has the authority to compel witnesses to testify.

The Ministry of Defence initially made an application to prevent the British public from hearing criticisms of the special forces, but abandoned that ambition on 3 July 2023.

Minister of State for Veterans' Affairs Johnny Mercer gave oral evidence to the inquiry on 21 February 2024. In April 2024, Mercer was ordered by Haddon-Cave to confidentially provide the names of those who told him about alleged war crimes by British special forces in Afghanistan. It is an offence to fail comply with such an order, which can result in a fine or imprisonment. In July 2024, it was reported that Mercer had provided further information and agreed to provide further assistance, and that Haddon-Cave would not be pursuing the order further for the time being.

In September 2024, an internal Ministry of Defence document written in 2019 was presented to the inquiry that concluded that the BBC Panorama allegations were "broadly accurate".

In late 2025, a former senior officer told the inquiry that British forces in Afghanistan executed suspects as well as unarmed civilians, including children, during operations and nothing was done despite widespread knowledge about the activities. On 1 December 2025, the officer, known as N1466, revealed that while working as the Assistant Chief of Staff for Operations in the UK Special Forces Headquarters, he had grown suspicious of the number of detainees killed during activities by a unit under the United Kingdom Special Forces known as UKSF1. The officer also said that during a raid, members of the Special Air Service shot at a mosquito net until there was no movement. He stated, "When the net was uncovered it was women and children. The incident was covered up and the individual who did the shooting was given some form of award to make it look legitimate."

N1466 also confirmed that evidence supporting allegations of war crimes was not passed to military police. In May 2026, the inquiry published a summary of the account of a former chief of staff, known as N2252. The officer explained to the inquiry in 2024 that the reason for the lack of referral – breaching every British military officer's "legal obligation to alert military police if they become aware that someone under their command may have committed a war crime" – was because it was believed that an investigation could disrupt operations and damage morale. An additional factor was that some of the evidence had originated from a rival special forces regiment.

== Potential Afghan witnesses ==
Hundreds of former members of the Afghan Territorial Force (ATF) 444 and Commando Force (CF) 333 that were part of the Ministry of Interior Affairs General Command of Police Special Units who were trained by and fought alongside UK Special Forces have been refused resettlement to the UK. One former UK Special Forces officer told the BBC that "At a time when certain actions by UK Special Forces are under investigation by a public inquiry, their headquarters also had the power to prevent former Afghan Special Forces colleagues and potential witnesses to these actions from getting safely to the UK."

In May 2025 BBC Panorama revealed that then-Colonel Sir Gwyn Jenkins oversaw the rejection of hundreds of UK resettlement applications from Afghan commandos who served with the SAS. It was reported that a UK Special Forces officer appointed by him stood over civil service caseworkers from the resettlement scheme and instructed them to repeatedly reject the applications on spurious grounds. This was controversial because if the Afghan commandos were in the UK, they could be called as witnesses to the inquiry, but the inquiry has no power to compel testimony from foreign nationals who are overseas. Jenkins was subsequently promoted to General and served as Vice Chief of the Defence Staff from 2022 until 2024, and as First Sea Lord since May 2025.

== See also ==
- British war crimes
- List of public inquiries in the United Kingdom
- United States kill or capture strategy in Iraq
- War crimes in Afghanistan
