= Shesh Aba raid =

2012 event in Afghanistan

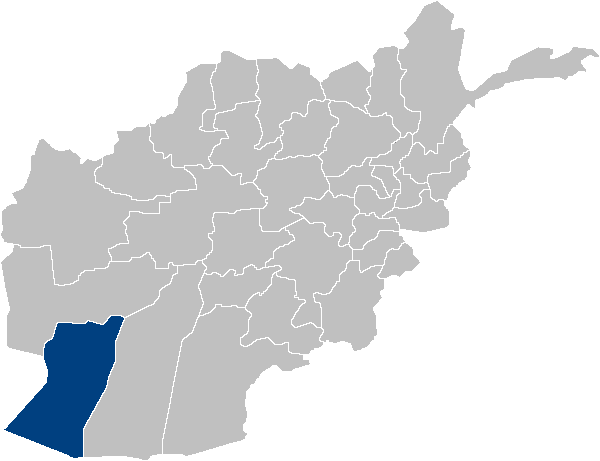
- Nimruz province location
Date	August 7, 2012
Location	Shesh Aba village, Nimruz Province, Afghanistan
Result	Death of 4 local civilians, 2 severe injuries

The Shesh Aba raid was a raid by the British Special Air Service in Shesh Aba village, Nimruz Province, Afghanistan on August 7, 2012, during which British armed forces killed two young parents and injured their two sons. The commander of the special forces did not report the fatal incident to military police.

== Raid ==
The raid occurred in the early morning of August 7, 2012, during the American War in Afghanistan (2001–2021). The night prior, two unknown men visited the home of the Abdul Aziz Uzbakzai. The men accepted the family's customary hospitality and left at 10pm. Shortly after, the people in the family home included Abdul Aziz Uzbakzai; his son, Hussain; Hussain's wife Ruqqia, and their sons, Imran (aged three years), Bilal (aged one and a half). At 3am, the British special forces Special Air Service undertook what they called a "Kill/Capture raid". They arrived in Shesh Aba village via helicopter, entered the family home while discharging firearms, and woke Abdul Aziz before blindfolding, handcuffing, beating and interrogating him, as per his claims. After the military left, Abdul Aziz realised that Hussain and Ruqqia had been killed and saw bullet wounds to their heads. Both Abdul Aziz's grandsons were missing, he later learned that they were taken away by the special forces due to injuries sustained in the raid. Bilal had bullet injuries to his face and shoulder and Imran had a bullet wound to his abdomen.

The same morning, 12-year-old neighbouring boy Mohammad Mohammad also found his two older brothers Mohammad Wali (aged 26) and Mohammad Juma (aged 28) dead with bullet wounds to their heads.

== Aftermath ==
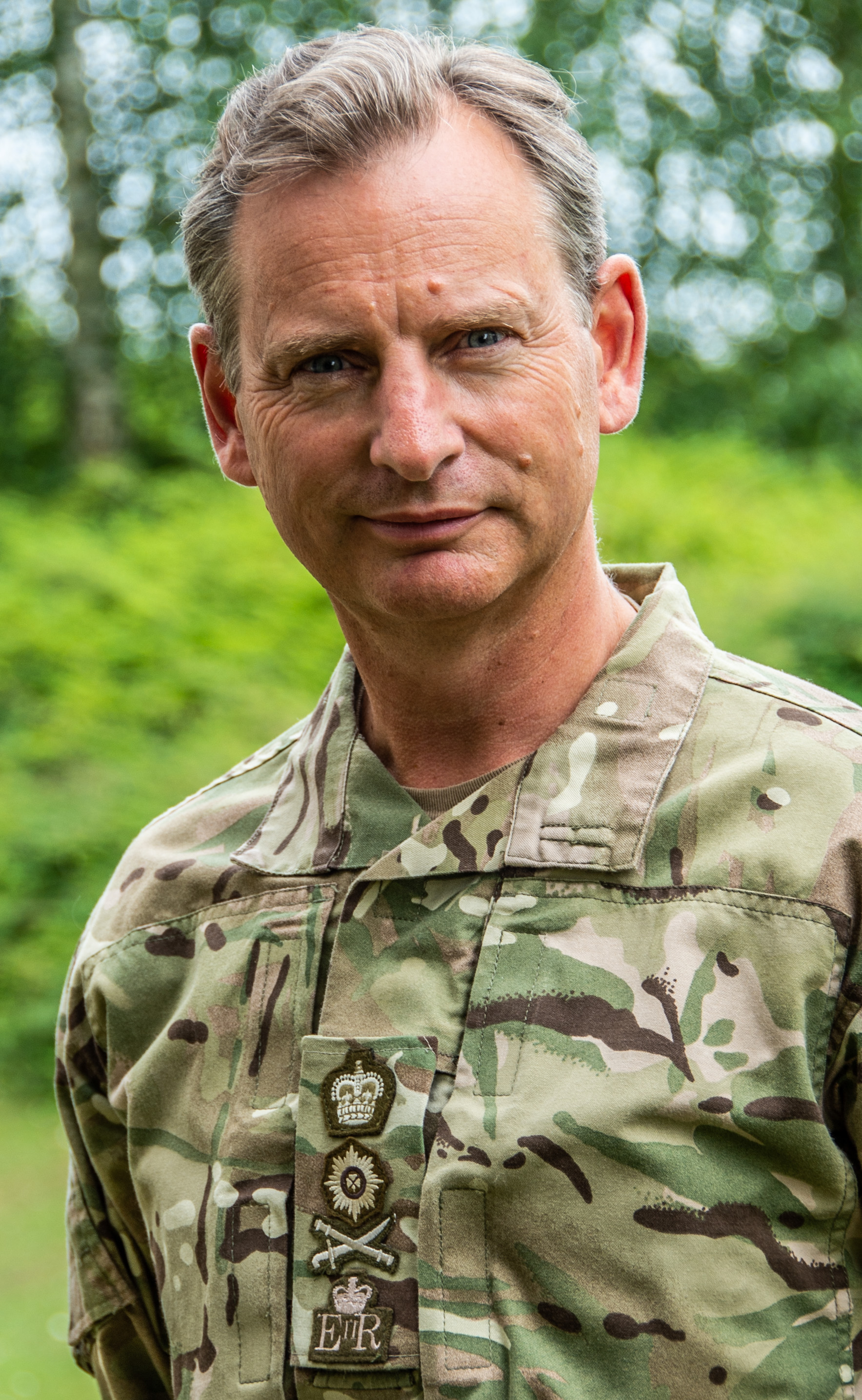
Mark Carleton-Smith was the commander of UK Special Forces in 2012

British military law obliges military commanders to inform military police if there is a possibility of an unlawful killing or grievous bodily harm offence having been committed. In the context of two children being injured and one woman being killed, the BBC received advice from a Royal Military Police former investigator who stated that there was "no question in my mind that this incident should have been referred to military police". A British armed forces Serious Incident Review was undertaken, but the circumstances of the raid was not referred to military police.

Mark Carleton-Smith, was the director of British Special Forces at the time of the raid.

Abdul Aziz claims to have rejected financial compensation.

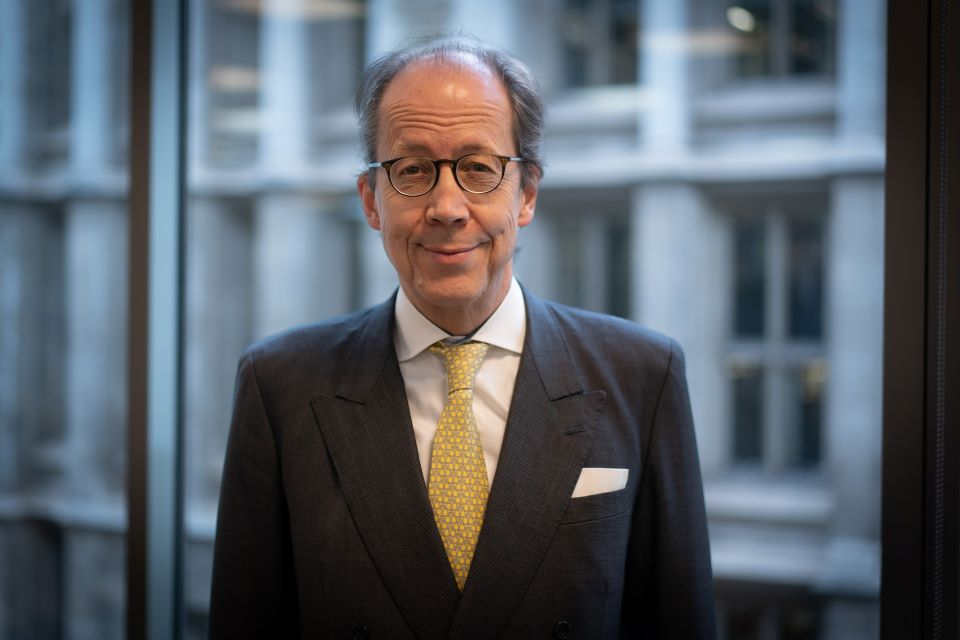
Judge Haddon-Cave in 2021

In 2022, the Royal Military Police stated that they were investigating the raid as a result of it being featured by BBC Panorama.

=== Afghan Unlawful Killings inquiry ===
In December 2022, British defence secretary Ben Wallace announced the UK Government's plan to hold the a public inquiry.

The inquiry was launched on 22 March 2023 and British judge Charles Haddon-Cave was later appointed as the chair of the inquiry. The inquiry's remit includes night raids undertaken by British special forces between 2010 and 2013.

In 2023, Abdul Aziz Uzbakzai told the BBC that the inquiry "cannot bring back my son and daughter-in-law, nor can it bring Imran and Bilal's parents back to them . . . But after 11 long years, I still want the British soldiers and other officials to come forward and reveal the truth."

== See also ==
- Night raid on Narang
- Afghanistan night raids
