= Dasht-e Shesh Ābeh =

Desert in Nimroz Province, Afghanistan

Coordinates: 31°36′03″N 62°36′45″E

The Dasht-e Shesh Ābeh, also Dasht-e Sheshāba or Shishāwa-e Dasht (Balochi: شیش آوهء دشت). is a desert in Afghanistan's Nimruz Province. It lies to the north of the Mazad village, Shishawa, Ghurghuri city, west of Rōd-e Khākak, south of Rōd-e Kutōrī and east of Sayyidak & Rōd-e Saydak. It is located at 567 m above sea level.
