= Nothing to Fear (song) =

1992 single by Chris Rea

Single by Chris Rea

from the album God's Great Banana Skin
- B-side: "Strange Dance"
- Released: 12 October 1992
- Length: 9:10 (full version); 6:45 (edit)
- Label: EastWest
- Songwriter: Chris Rea
- Producer: Chris Rea

Chris Rea singles chronology
"Winter Song" (1991)	"Nothing to Fear" (1992)	"God's Great Banana Skin" (1992)

Music video
- "Nothing to Fear (Official Music Video)" on YouTube

"Nothing to Fear" is a song by British singer-songwriter Chris Rea, released on 12 October 1992 as the lead single from his twelfth studio album, God's Great Banana Skin. It was written and produced by Rea. "Nothing to Fear" reached number 16 in the UK Singles Chart and remained in the top 75 for four weeks. A music video was filmed to promote the single, directed by Andy Morahan.

== Background ==
"Nothing to Fear" was written in response to Islamophobia after Rea heard a Muslim man speaking on the radio. Rea told John Pidgeon in 1992: "[It's] a song about a European guy welcoming Muslims, and the gist of the story is that if you show us we have nothing to fear, there's gonna be no problem. And it's asking them to show a sign of peace. Once we all had to be frightened of the Russians, then we had to be frightened of the Chinese, and at the moment, for the last year, it's been this coming of the Muslims thing." Rea also said the lyrics are intended to have a double meaning to "apply to man and a woman, or any relationship, in it's [sic] beginning."

The song was released as the album's lead single. Speaking of the decision to release the full nine-minute version to radio, Rea's manager Paul Lilly told Music & Media in 1992: "We felt the album should be given some weight by this strong track. Although radio edits are available, we delivered the long version first. Our purpose was to get the full length version aired at least once, and then leave the choice to the programmers."

== Critical reception ==
Upon release, Music & Media wrote: "A nine-minute single with the impact of "Private Investigations" and with a cinematic slide guitar intro of Paris, Texas-like proportions. In a review of the album, The Lennox Herald commented: "The nine-minute single "Nothing to Fear" is aimed at releasing good music rather than keeping an eye on the charts and is a good example of how Rea hasn't compromised his music." Mike Daly of The Age commented: "On "Nothing to Fear", Rea allows his guitar full rein, richly coloring this long, flamenco-flavored song with its literate attempt to bridge the gulf between Christian and Muslim society."

Lynn Saxberg of The Ottawa Citizen considered the song a "direct descendant" of "The Road to Hell", with "emotional" slide guitar work. Patrick Davitt of The Leader-Post wrote: "The Leonard Cohen-ish "Nothing to Fear" opens with a spacy, slightly distorted and bent guitar solo, over an eerie sustained synth note. Rea's characteristic deep and textured voice makes sure the mood stays sombre." Terry Craig of The StarPhoenix noted the song's "tour de force slide guitar introduction" which he considered "cuts anything Mark Knopfler has done recently".

== Track listings ==
7-inch single

1. "Nothing to Fear" – 9:10
2. "Nothing to Fear (Edit)" – 6:45
3. "Strange Dance" – 4:14

Cassette single

1. "Nothing to Fear" – 9:10
2. "Nothing to Fear (Edit)" – 6:45
3. "Strange Dance" – 4:14

CD single 1 (UK)

1. "Nothing to Fear" – 9:10
2. "The Road to Hell (NEC Live 1991)" – 6:44
3. "Working on It (NEC Live 1991)" – 6:31

CD single 2 (UK and Europe)

1. "Nothing to Fear" – 9:10
2. "Daytona (NEC Live 1991)" – 6:36
3. "On the Beach (Paris Live 1991)" – 4:30

== Personnel ==
- Chris Rea – vocals, guitars
- Max Middleton – synthesiser

Production

- Chris Rea – production
- Neil Amor – engineering
- Phillipe Garcia, Simon Wall – assistant engineering
- Tommy F.N. Willis – guitar technician

== Charts ==
Chart (1992)	Peak position
Europe (Eurochart Hot 100)	55
Switzerland (Schweizer Hitparade)	38
UK Singles (OCC)	16

== Release history ==
Region	Date	Format(s)	Label(s)	Ref.
United Kingdom	12 October 1992	7-inch vinyl; CD; cassette	EastWest	
Australia	16 November 1992	CD; cassette	EastWest	
Japan	28 November 1992	CD	EastWest	
