= Soft Top, Hard Shoulder (song) =

1993 single by Chris Rea

Single by Chris Rea

from the album God's Great Banana Skin
- B-side: "Soft Top, Hard Shoulder" (Half Time version)
- Released: 18 January 1993
- Length: 4:30
- Label: EastWest
- Songwriter: Chris Rea
- Producer: Chris Rea

Chris Rea singles chronology
"God's Great Banana Skin" (1992)	"Soft Top, Hard Shoulder" (1993)	"Too Much Pride" (1993)

Music video
- "Soft Top, Hard Shoulder" on YouTube

"Soft Top, Hard Shoulder" is a song by British singer-songwriter Chris Rea, released on 18 January 1993 as the third single from his 12th studio album, God's Great Banana Skin, and the soundtrack of the 1992 British comedy drama film of the same name. "Soft Top, Hard Shoulder", which was written and produced by Rea, reached No. 53 in the United Kingdom and remained on the chart for two weeks. A music video was filmed to promote the single.

Two editions of the single was issued on CD. The first contained three previously unreleased tracks from 1980: "One Fine Day", "One Sweet and Tender Touch" and "Sierra, Sierra", while the second contained two additional tracks from the Soft Top Hard Shoulder film: "Melancholy" and "The Van Stomp/Glasgow Horizon".

== Background ==
"Soft Top, Hard Shoulder" was specifically written for the film of the same name. During sessions for God's Great Banana Skin, Rea discovered the film project after seeing the idea plugged on Channel 4. He told John Pidgeon in a 1992 interview: "I saw these guys struggling with a lower budget and the idea of the movie. I saw what they were trying to do and was very impressed. It seemed very real life and it appealed to me. So I went down immediately, that morning, knocked on their door and said, I want to do the music for the film."

== Critical reception ==
Upon release, Music & Media wrote: "Soft pop, hard mould. The power of Rea's [latest] single is skindeep, maybe because of the reminiscence of outlaw Lee Clayton's "I Ride Alone"." In a review of God's Great Banana Skin, Patrick Davitt of The Leader-Post described the song as "aggressive and urgent". In a 2017 article on British road movies, The Skinny noted the film's "earworm in the form of Chris Rea's title track".

== Track listings ==
7-inch single

1. "Soft Top, Hard Shoulder" – 4:30
2. "Soft Top, Hard Shoulder" (Half Time version) – 2:25

Cassette single

1. "Soft Top, Hard Shoulder" – 4:30
2. "Soft Top, Hard Shoulder" (Half Time version) – 2:25

CD single 1

1. "Soft Top, Hard Shoulder" – 4:30
2. "One Fine Day" – 4:04
3. "One Sweet and Tender Touch" – 4:41
4. "Sierra, Sierra" – 4:13

CD single 2

1. "Soft Top, Hard Shoulder" – 4:30
2. "Melancholy" – 1:40
3. "The Van Stomp/Glasgow Horizon" – 2:50
4. "Soft Top, Hard Shoulder" (Half Time version) – 2:25

== Personnel ==
- Chris Rea – vocals, guitars
- Max Middleton – keyboards
- Robert Ahwai – bass
- Martin Ditcham – drums

Production

- Chris Rea – production
- Neil Amor – engineering
- Phillipe Garcia – assistant engineering
- Simon Wall – assistant engineering
- Tommy F.N. Willis – guitar technician

== Charts ==
Chart (1993)	Peak position
Germany (GfK)	54
UK Singles (OCC)	53
