= Espresso Logic =

Studio album by Chris Rea
- Released: 1 November 1993
- Recorded: April – August 1993
- Studio: The Mill (Berkshire, England); Outside Studios (Oxfordshire, England); Studio Miraval (Le Val, France)
- Genre: Album-oriented rock
- Length: 48:07 (original release); 53:21 (US edition)
- Label: East West
- Producer: Chris Rea

Chris Rea chronology
God's Great Banana Skin (1992)	Espresso Logic (1993)	The Best of Chris Rea (1994)

Music video
- "Julia (1993)" on YouTube

Professional ratings
Review scores
Source	Rating
AllMusic	2.5/5 stars
Calgary Herald	B+
Music Week	4/5 stars

Espresso Logic is the thirteenth studio album by British singer-songwriter Chris Rea, released in 1993. The US edition of the album has a significantly different track listing, featuring two songs ("God's Great Banana Skin" and "Miles Is a Cigarette") from Rea's previous album, God's Great Banana Skin, which was not released in the US, along with "If You Were Me", a track recorded with Elton John for his 1993 Duets release. The cover art of the US edition is the same as the UK single "Espresso Logic". The song "Julia" was dedicated to his daughter Julia Christina, who was four years old at the time.

== Critical reception ==
A "refined, elegant, rock style" characterizes the record, which continues Rea's '90s run of "commercially successful and critically acclaimed albums". A review in Guitar Player finds that "Rea immediately declares his multi-ethnic impulses", as the title track begins with his "languidly atmospheric slide guitar shimmering like the Pacific Ocean under a full Oahu moon. Then Davy Spillane's mournful Uillean pipes inject Celtic melancholy, and the two instruments interweave throughout the track, accompanied by a Brazilian-inflected tribal rhythm, until they are nearly indistinguishable from one another." Rea recorded the album using the two '62 Fender Stratocasters, plugged into a Fender piggyback amp, "that he's relied on for more than a decade", and he uses a glass slide, rather than a brass one. "From working with Irish pipers, I've adopted this technique of banging the slide onto the harmonic. So I've had to stop using the brass, because I've only got one more refret on my pink Strat. I've played it so hard that I don't think there's gonna be any wood left," he ruefully acknowledges.

== Track listing ==
All songs written by Chris Rea.

=== Original track listing ===
1. "Espresso Logic" – 6:54
2. "Red" – 5:26
3. "Soup of the Day" – 3:45
4. "Johnny Needs a Fast Car" – 6:35
5. "Between the Devil and the Deep Blue Sea" – 4:50
6. "Julia" – 3:55
7. "Summer Love" – 4:07
8. "New Way" – 3:30
9. "Stop" – 5:10
10. "She Closed Her Eyes" – 3:55

=== US track listing ===
1. "Espresso Logic" – 6:53
2. "Julia" – 3:54
3. "Soup of the Day" – 3:46
4. "If You Were Me" (duet with Elton John) – 4:20
5. "Johnny Needs a Fast Car" – 6:34
6. "Between the Devil and the Deep Blue Sea" – 4:49
7. "God's Great Banana Skin" – 5:18
8. "Miles Is a Cigarette" – 4:21
9. "Summer Love" – 4:04
10. "Red" – 5:26
11. "She Closed Her Eyes" – 3:56

== Personnel ==
- Chris Rea – vocals, organ, guitars, slide guitar
- Max Middleton – acoustic piano, keyboards
- Robert Ahwai – guitars
- Sylvin Marc – bass
- Martin Ditcham – drums, percussion
- Andy Fairweather-Low – audience handclaps (9)
- Davy Spillane – Uilleann pipes (1, 2)
- Pete Beachill – trombone (1, 3, 4, 8)
- Dave Stewart – trombone (1, 3, 4, 8)
- Linda Taylor – backing vocals (6, 8)

US release

- Davy Spillane – Uilleann pipes (1, 10)
- Pete Beachill – trombone (1, 3, 5)
- Dave Stewart – trombone (1, 3, 5)
- Linda Taylor – backing vocals (2)
- Elton John – vocals (4)
- Valerie Chalmers – backing vocals (7, 8)
- Emma Whittle – backing vocals (7, 8)

=== Production ===
- Chris Rea – producer, sleeve concept
- Stuart Epps – engineer
- Paul Mortimer – engineer
- Tommy Willis – guitar technician
- Willie Grimston – coordination
- Stylorouge – artwork
- Stephen Sandon – sleeve photography
- Jim Beach – management
- Paul Lilly – management

US release

- Stuart Epps – engineer (1–6, 9–11)
- Paul Mortimer – engineer (1–6, 9–11)
- Neil Amor – engineer (7, 8)
- Phillipe Garcia – assistant engineer (7, 8)
- Simon Wall – assistant engineer (7, 8)

== Charts ==
=== Weekly charts ===
Weekly chart performance for Espresso Logic
Chart (1993)	Peak position
Austrian Albums (Ö3 Austria)	16
Dutch Albums (Album Top 100)	46
German Albums (Offizielle Top 100)	14
Hungarian Albums (MAHASZ)	20
Swedish Albums (Sverigetopplistan)	29
Swiss Albums (Schweizer Hitparade)	24
UK Albums (OCC)	8

=== Year-end charts ===
Year-end chart performance for Espresso Logic
Chart (1993)	Position
UK Albums (OCC)	85

== Certifications ==
Certifications and sales for Espresso Logic
Region	Certification	Certified units/sales
Germany (BVMI)	Gold	250,000^{^}
United Kingdom (BPI)	Gold	100,000^{^}
^{^} Shipments figures based on certification alone.
