= West Kirby Grammar School =

Girl's grammar school with mixed sixth-form in West Kirby, Wirral, England

Location
- Graham Road; West Kirby; Metropolitan Borough of Wirral, Merseyside, CH48 5DP; England
- Coordinates: 53.378°N 3.185°W

Information
- Type: Grammar school; Academy
- Motto: Ad metam contendo 'Strive towards the goal'
- Religious affiliation: None
- Established: 1913
- Department for Education URN: 137243 Tables
- Ofsted: Reports
- Chair of Governors: A Waller
- Head teacher: S Clarke
- Gender: Female (11-16); Mixed Sixth Form(16-18)
- Age: 11 to 18
- Enrolment: 1200+
- Houses: Hudson, Stewart, Gonner, Furniss, Wallis, Paton
- Website: http://www.wkgs.org/

West Kirby Grammar School (abbreviated to WKGS) is a non-denominational selective state grammar school, founded in 1913, with academy status in West Kirby on the Wirral Peninsula, England. The school admits girls from age 11 to 18, with boys admitted for the sixth form only.

The school is one of The Sunday Times top one hundred state schools.

== History ==
The school was founded in 1913. It celebrated its 100th anniversary in 2013 with a party at Thornton Hall Hotel and concert at Liverpool Philharmonic Hall. A newspaper, The West Kirby Centenary Times, was produced by students to commemorate the centenary.

The school was given a grant to renovate facilities on site, which was used to build two new teaching blocks, with work due to be completed in 2009. The technology block was completed in September 2007, and the English/Humanities block in October 2008.

The school has several international links, successfully running a variety of trips to Fougeres, France; Cologne and Aachen, Germany; Barcelona, Spain; Yaroslavl, Russia and an exchange programme with a school in Gladenbach, Germany. Additionally the school often raises funds for its "Make a Difference" campaign, raising money for Inner Mongolian schools, before having a trip for selected students in the summer holidays to Hong Kong, mainland China and to Inner Mongolia to see how the money is being put to use. Furthermore, in 2006 the school won the Wirral International School Award.

The school has 6 houses; Hudson (White), Stewart (Yellow), Gonner (Blue), Furniss (Purple), Wallis (Red) and Paton (Green). These all compete throughout the year at various house events ranging from music and a general knowledge quiz to team and individual sports.

Two pupils from the school have taken part in the international schools Arctic expedition and the international young scientists space camp; both these pupils who attended sixth form at the school were representing the UK. The school's Under 13 football team has also achieved national success after competing in the final of the tournament at Wembley stadium.

== Curriculum ==
Pupils at the school study a standard UK curriculum with GCSE and A-Level examinations taken at ages 16 and 18.

Sports studied as standard in Physical Education lessons include Hockey, Netball, Tennis, Gymnastics and Athletics.

Students from West Kirby Grammar School had the chance to quiz a senior Government minister when they held their own question time session.

== Links with other schools ==
There is a large Combined Cadet Force contingent shared with Calday Grange Grammar School, which students from Year 9 upwards can join. There is a German exchange programme and there are also links with schools in Germany, Finland, Hungary and Poland through the European Union's Comenius programme.

== Notable former pupils ==
- Shirley Hughes, children's author
- Glenda Jackson, actress and former Labour MP from 1992 to 2015 for Hampstead and Highgate
- Jan Ravens, from Dead Ringers, noted for her impersonations of Ruth Archer from The Archers, and Kirsty Wark from Newsnight
- Sheila McClennon, Radio 4 presenter on Woman's Hour and You and Yours
