= God's Great Banana Skin (song) =

1992 single by Chris Rea

Single by Chris Rea

from the album God's Great Banana Skin
- B-side: "I Saw You Coming"
- Released: 16 November 1992
- Length: 5:15 (album version); 4:16 (remix)
- Label: EastWest
- Songwriter: Chris Rea
- Producer: Chris Rea

Chris Rea singles chronology
"Nothing to Fear" (1992)	"God's Great Banana Skin" (1992)	"Soft Top Hard Shoulder" (1993)

"God's Great Banana Skin" is a song by British singer-songwriter Chris Rea, released on 16 November 1992 by East West Records as the second single from his 12th studio album, God's Great Banana Skin (1992). The song was written and produced by Rea, and reached No. 31 on the UK Singles Chart, remaining on the chart for three weeks.

== Background ==
Rea was inspired to write the song after he noticed his daughter was tempted to laugh at "somebody who'd been giving her a hard time". Rea told John Pidgeon in 1992: "I told her 'don't laugh when people go down even if they've been awful to you because you're tempting God to throw you a banana skin'. It's half moral and half superstition. Anybody who's done me a disservice in life, and I see them go down, you get tempted to laugh. I don't know whether it's superstition or not, or I daren't laugh just in case God throws me a banana skin as well."

== Critical reception ==
Upon release, Robert Tilli of Music & Media wrote: "The tag line of the title track, sung in a dark threatening voice, is easy to sing along with, making it the ideal second single. The wailing harmonica in the background matches perfectly with the November rain and storms."

In a review of the album, Vlado Forgac of The Morning Star commented: "On the title track, Rea offers a humorous look at his own perception of faith." Lynn Saxberg of the Ottawa Citizen noted the "cryptic message" of the song and how it "addresses the superstitious idea that bad luck will come not only to those who think they're better than others, but also people who think they're inferior".

== Track listings ==
- 7-inch and cassette single
1. "God's Great Banana Skin" (remix) – 4:16
2. "I Saw You Coming" – 4:30
- CD single
1. "God's Great Banana Skin" (remix) – 4:16
2. "Just Passing Through" (live) – 6:09
3. "Footprints in the Snow" (live) – 4:32
4. "Winter Song" – 4:32
- CD single (UK limited edition release)
1. "God's Great Banana Skin" (remix) – 4:16
2. "I Saw You Coming" – 4:30
3. "She's Gonna Change Everything" – 4:46
4. "You Must Be Evil" (live) – 4:47

== Personnel ==
Production

- Chris Rea – production ("God's Great Banana Skin", "I Saw You Coming", "She's Gonna Change Everything")
- Neil Amor – engineering ("God's Great Banana Skin", "I Saw You Coming", "She's Gonna Change Everything")
- Targa Flurio – remixing ("God's Great Banana Skin")
- Jon Kelly – production ("Winter Song")

Other

- Chris Welch – banana illustration
- Stylorouge – artwork

== Charts ==
Chart (1992)	Peak position
Europe (European Hit Radio)	33
Germany (GfK)	59
UK Singles (Official Charts)	31
