= InterAct Stroke Support =

Stroke charity in the United Kingdom

InterAct Stroke Support, previously known as the InterAct Reading Service, is a charity registered with the Charity Commission Of England and Wales. Its aim is to support the rehabilitation of stroke survivors through a live interactive reading service. The charity was formed in 2000 by the theatre director Caroline Smith. It won a King's Fund GSK Impact Award in 2005, later winning a Guardian Charity Award in 2009. In 2020 the charity was the subject of the Radio 4 Charity Appeal.

In 2024, as the charity approached its 25th anniversary, Caroline was the subject of Radio 4's Gap Finder programme on "You and Yours."

INterAct began work in a number of London hospitals, now 11, and also works across the UK including Brighton Cardiff, Glasgow and Northern Ireland. Professional actors read to and converse with stroke patients with the aim of lifting mood and providing mental stimulation. The charity provide a remote service for any discharged stroke survivors in their homes.

== Research ==
Several studies have been carried out pointing to the benefits of the service. The Department of Public Health Sciences at King's College London conducted an evaluation of the service carried out by Professor Charles Wolfe with Christopher McKevitt and Maria Higgins
