= Jessie Cave =

English actress, author (born 1987)

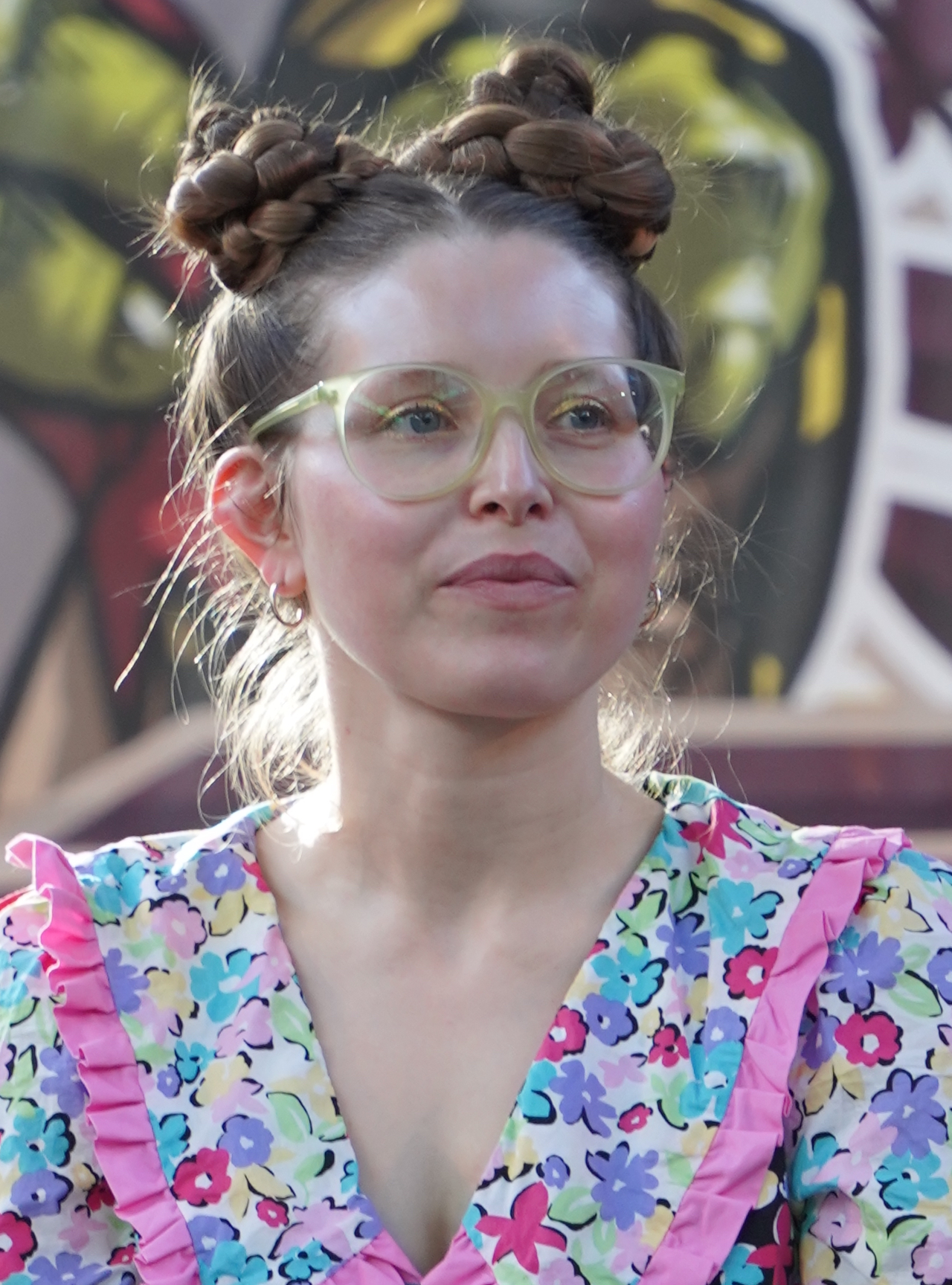
- Cave in 2022
- Born: Jessie Cave; 1987 (age 39); London, England
- Education: Kingston University
- Occupations: Actress; comedian; YouTuber; cartoonist; author
- Years active: 2007–present
- Partner: Alfie Brown (2014–present)
- Children: 4
- Relatives: Bebe Cave (sister); Philip Haddon-Cave (maternal grandfather); Charles Haddon-Cave (maternal uncle)

Jessie Cave (born 1987) is an English actress, comedian, YouTuber, author, and cartoonist, known for her role as Lavender Brown in the Harry Potter film series and for her shows in London and at the Edinburgh Fringe. She has also published a book of cartoon doodles called Love Sick, some of the designs in which have appeared on greeting cards. A comedic play based on her life and relationships, Sunrise, was first performed in 2019. Cave's first novel, Sunset, was published in 2021.

== Early life ==
Cave was born in London, the second oldest of three boys and two girls. Her father and her mother, Debbie, are both general practitioners. Her youngest sibling, sister Bebe Cave, is also an actress. In March 2019, her younger brother, actor and musician Ben Haddon-Cave, died by electrocution while drunkenly train surfing atop a freight train running adjacent to the London Overground's Mildmay line. Through her mother, she is the granddaughter of the daughter of former Chief Secretary of Hong Kong, Sir Philip Haddon-Cave, the niece of the former Senior Presiding Judge for England and Wales, Sir Charles Haddon-Cave.

A former county-level swimmer and ex-national tennis player, she studied illustration and animation at Kingston University, dropping out aged 19. Her tennis career was cut short by injury when she was 15. In her 2018 comedic one-woman play Sunrise, Cave discussed that she had been raped as a young teenager by an older man; in 2020, she revealed that the perpetrator was her tennis coach, that she was 14, and that he had gone to prison for the crime. She had originally intended to study stage management at the Royal Academy of Dramatic Arts, and worked in London as a stagehand, before deciding to pursue acting.

== Career ==
Cave made her acting debut in the drama Summerhill, shown on CBBC in early 2008.

She won the role of Lavender Brown in the film Harry Potter and the Half-Blood Prince through an open casting call held on 1 July 2007. Cave, who came from an agency, beat over 7,000 girls who turned up for the audition. She also performed the voice of Lavender in the video-game adaptations of Harry Potter and the Half-Blood Prince and Harry Potter and the Deathly Hallows: Part 2.

In June 2009, she made her West End début, playing Thomasina in a revival of Tom Stoppard's Arcadia at the Duke of York's Theatre. That December, Cave had a minor role in the 2009 film Inkheart as a water nymph.

She appeared in the play Breed at Theatre503, playing the role of Liv, from 21 September to 16 October 2010. She received the 2011 Offie for People's Choice for Female Performance.

On 4 February 2011, she appeared as a one-off character, Hermione, on the CBBC children's drama Sadie J.

Cave runs the website Pindippy, and its associated YouTube channel of the same name, which features short videos written by and starring Cave herself, with occasional appearances from some of her Harry Potter costars, including her close friend, Evanna Lynch.

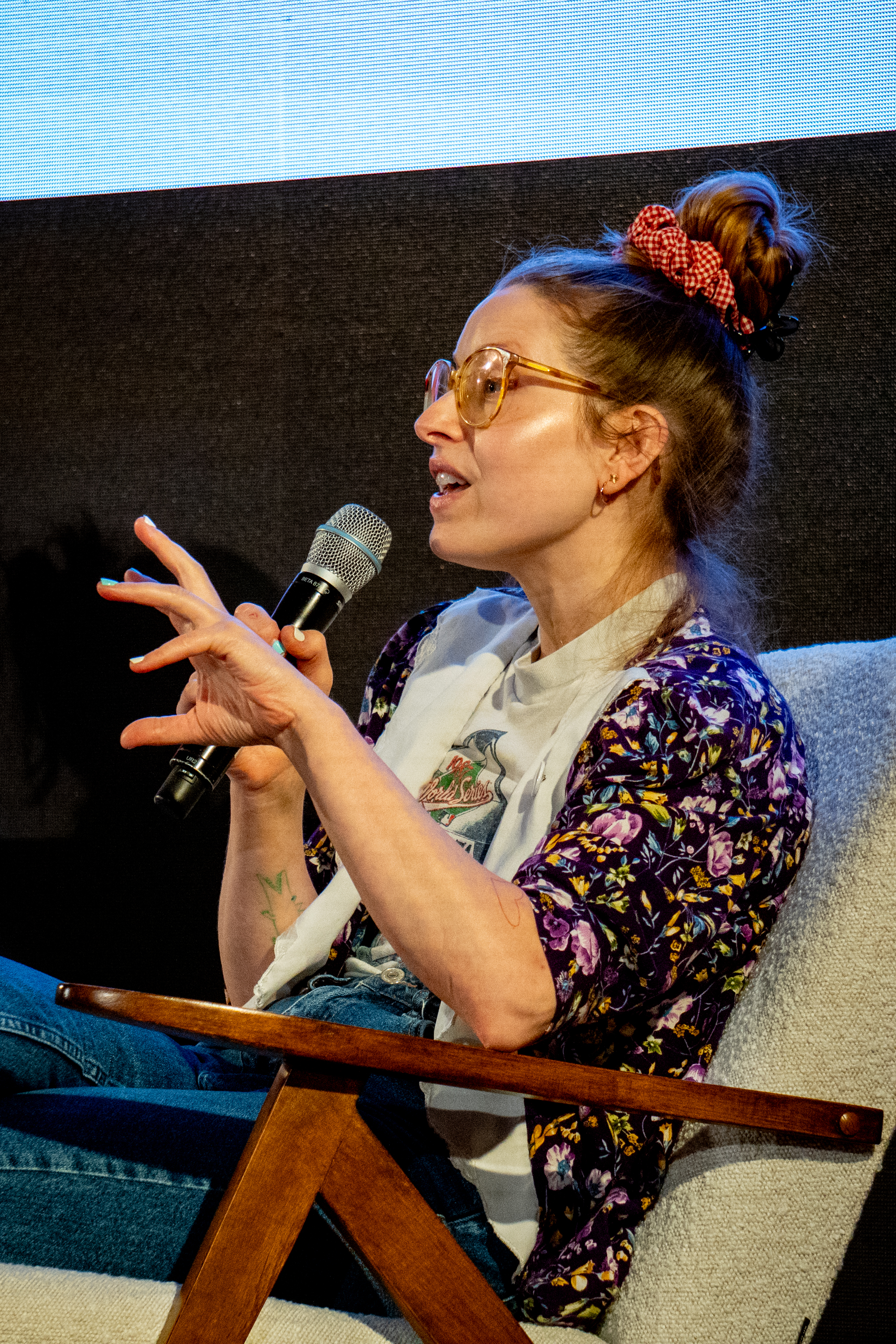
Jessie Cave at the 2024 Edinburgh International Book Festival in Edinburgh, Scotland.

She played the title character in a 2012 production of J. M. Barrie's Mary Rose at the DogOrange Theatre, in London. That same year, she appeared as Zazzy in the final episode of season 2 of Grandma's House, which aired on 24 May 2012, and in the role of elder Biddy in 2012's Great Expectations, based on the novel by Charles Dickens and directed by Mike Newell. During the filming of Great Expectations, Cave worked alongside her younger sister Bebe (who played the younger Biddy) and was also reunited with her Harry Potter costars Helena Bonham Carter, Robbie Coltrane, and Ralph Fiennes. By June 2012, Cave had amassed over 30,000 followers on her Twitter account.

Cave has had several minor television roles. She appeared as a waitress named Angela in a medieval restaurant in the second series of BBC Three's Pramface, which aired on 8 January 2013. She appeared as Theodora Snitch, a character in YouTube's one-off revival of the TV series Knightmare; as Denise in episode 2 of Coming Up Series 8; as Alicia Ferguson on the CBBC series Wizards vs Aliens, in the two-part episode "The Thirteenth Floor"; as Anne-Marie Bonner in series 2 of The Job Lot; and as Annie Maddocks in the E4 drama Glue in 2014. She has appeared as herself on game shows, including 8 Out of 10 Cats Does Countdown in 2017 and Richard Osman's House of Games in November 2021.

In August 2012, Cave made her debut at the Edinburgh Festival Fringe with her show Bookworm, which is described as "a charming hour of character comedy and loving literary silliness inspired by the obsessive Potter fans" Cave encountered while starring in the Harry Potter films. In the show, Cave stars as the bossy leader of a book club named Bookworms United, whose sidekick is played by her younger sister, Bebe. Cave's character expresses her enthusiasm for topics ranging from Babar to Andre Agassi's autobiography through a combination of homemade props and shadow puppetry, which conceal the character's neurosis and contrast with a subplot about an ex-boyfriend.

Her 2018 Edinburgh Fringe show Sunrise was described as an "emotionally intelligent [and] honest" performance. and has since been published as a playtext by Nick Hern Books. She also does regular comedy shows at venues in Soho, London.

== Other activities ==
In 2012, Cave created a fashion range of colourful boho-chic harem-style pants, called "Cave Pants". In 2015, her book Lovesick, a collection of cartoons, was published by Ebury Publishing. These cartoons have also been made into a greeting card range published by Cardmix.

Cave and her sister, actor Bebe Cave, began a podcast in 2020, We Can't Talk About That Right Now.

In March 2025, Jessie Cave announced she had launched an OnlyFans account focused exclusively on sensual, ASMR‑style hair content for a niche fetish audience—rather than sexual material—as a means to pay off debt, fund home renovations, and reclaim a sense of empowerment and self‑love. In August 2026, Cave revealed that her earnings from the site had become a vital financial lifeline, surpassing her total career acting income within a single year and generating as much as £15,000 in a single day. Despite her financial success, she noted encountering social stigma and stated she was barred from attending a Harry Potter fan convention due to the platform's association with adult content.

== Personal life ==
Cave is in a relationship with comedian Alfie Brown, son of composer Steve Brown and impressionist Jan Ravens. They have four children: a son born in October 2014, a daughter born in July 2016, a second son born in October 2020, and a third son born in March 2022.

The couple's relationship inspired Cave's 2015 Edinburgh Festival Fringe comedy show I Loved Her. They broke up after the birth of their second child, and Cave explored their breakup and co-parenting experience in her 2018 show Sunrise. In 2018, Cave and Brown, who were separated at the time, took part in Comedy Central's Roast Battle. The couple eventually reconciled.

In January 2021, Cave's third child was treated in hospital after testing positive for COVID-19. In February 2022, Cave tested positive for COVID-19 while pregnant with her fourth child. The following month, she was admitted to hospital where she gave birth.

== Filmography ==
=== Television ===
Year	Title	Role	Notes
2007	Cranford	Villager	Episode: "April 1843"
2008	Summerhill	Stella	TV movie
2011	Sadie J	Hermione	Episode: "Slumberlicious"
2012	Grandma's House	Zazzy	Episode: "The Day Simon and his Family Opened the Door to Acceptance"
2013	Pramface	Angela	Episode: "The Edge of Hell"
2013	Dani's Castle	Lady Steffie	Episode: "The Lying Game"
2013	Coming Up	Denise	Episode: "Burger Van Champion"
2013	BBC Comedy Feeds	Various	Episode: "The Cariad Show"
2013	Wizards vs Aliens	Alicia Ferguson	2 episodes
2013	Medics	Millie	TV movie
2014	Cardinal Burns	Various	1 episode
2014	The Job Lot	Anne-Marie Bonner	Episode: "MP"
2014	Glue Online	Annie Maddocks	Episode: "Glue: One Day Before"
2014	Glue	Annie Maddocks	Main cast
2014	Give Out Girls	George	Episode: "The Truth"
2015	High & Dry Blap	Susan	TV movie
2015–2018	Trollied	Heather	Main cast (seasons 5, 7)
2016	Call the Midwife	Connie Manley	1 episode
2017	Loaded	Rachel Cooper	Episode: "The Red List"
2017	Porridge	Karen	Episode: "The Listener"
2017	The Rebel	Steph	Episode: "Death"
2017	Black Mirror	Edna	Episode: "Hang the DJ"
2017	8 Out of 10 Cats Does Countdown	Herself	1 episode
2018	Father Brown	Pandora Pott	Episode: "The Kembleford Dragon"
2020	Industry	Bobby	Episode: "Quiet and Nice"
2021	Richard Osman's House of Games	Herself	5 episodes
2021	The Stand Up Sketch Show	Herself	1 episode
2021–2023	Buffering	Rosie	Main cast
2022	The Baby	Amy	Episode: "The Bulldozer"
2022	Miss Scarlet and The Duke (TV series)	Hattie Parker	Episodes 1,2,5,6

=== Film ===
Year	Title	Role	Notes
2009	Inkheart	Water Nymph	Uncredited
2009	Harry Potter and the Half-Blood Prince	Lavender Brown	
2010	Harry Potter and the Deathly Hallows – Part 1	Lavender Brown	
2011	Harry Potter and the Deathly Hallows – Part 2	Lavender Brown	
2012	Great Expectations	Biddy	
2013	Knightmare	Theodora Snitch	Short film
2014	Pride	Zoe	
2015	Tale of Tales	Fenizia	
2015	Anna, Island	Lou	Short film
2016	The Baby Shower	Leela	Short film
2017	Modern Life Is Rubbish	Kerry	
2018	Benjamin	Martha	
2026	The Runner	Alice	Minor Role

=== Video games ===
Year	Title	Role	Notes
2009	Harry Potter and the Half-Blood Prince	Lavender Brown (voice)	
2011	Harry Potter and the Deathly Hallows – Part 2	Lavender Brown (voice)	

== Authored works ==
- Sunset, Welbeck Publishing Group, 2021. ISBN 9781787395299
