= Khunia =

Khunia خونیا
- Village
- Location in Afghanistan
- Coordinates: 31°33′43″N 62°44′44″E
- Country: Afghanistan
- Province: Nimruz Province
- District: Khash Rod
- Elevation: 585 m (1,919 ft)

Population
  - Total: 500
- Time zone: + 4.30

Khunia (Persian: خونیا), is a village in Khash Rod district of Nimroz Province in western Afghanistan and close to Qala-e Nawa and Mazad villages. The village is three miles away from the Khash River.
