= Auberge (album) =

Studio album by Chris Rea
- Released: 25 February 1991
- Recorded: December 1989 – December 1990
- Studio: Miraval
- Genre: Blues rock; soft rock
- Length: 54:33 (59:15)
- Label: WEA; East West; Atco
- Producer: Jon Kelly

Chris Rea chronology
The Road to Hell (1989)	Auberge (1991)	God's Great Banana Skin (1992)

Professional ratings
Review scores
Source	Rating
AllMusic	4/5 stars
Q	3/5
Record Mirror	7/10

Auberge (a French word meaning "inn") is the eleventh studio album by British singer-songwriter Chris Rea, released in February 1991. The album, as well as the title song, is notable for its association with the Caterham Super Seven that Rea owned, which he called the "Blue Seven". The car appears on the album cover, illustrated in oil by motoring artist Alan Fearnley. The album makes several references to the car over several tracks, as well on the video of the title song, and its cover illustration was used for its adverts. In 2005, Rea sold the car in an auction.

== Singles ==
The title track gave Rea one of his biggest hits in the UK Singles Chart, where it reached number 16. Other tracks released as singles were "Heaven", "Looking for the Summer" and "Winter Song".

== Commercial performance ==
Auberge reached number one in the UK Albums Chart and number one in the German Albums Chart in 1991. Q Magazine described the album as 'more of the same, with a few subtle differences to keep both doubters and aficionados guessing'.

== Track listing ==
All tracks written by Chris Rea.

1. "Auberge" – 7:18
2. "Gone Fishing" – 4:41
3. "You're Not a Number" – 5:00
4. "Heaven" – 4:13
5. "Set Me Free" – 6:53
6. "Winter Song" – 4:35
7. "Red Shoes" – 3:54
8. "Sing a Song of Love to Me" – 3:34
9. "Every Second Counts" – 5:08
10. "Looking for the Summer" – 5:03
11. "And You My Love" – 5:28
12. "The Mention of Your Name" – 3:17
- "Winter Song" did not appear on the initial album release; released as a stand-alone single in November 1991, it was included on some subsequent CD issues.

== Personnel ==
- Chris Rea – lead vocals, Hammond organ, harmonica, slide guitar, classical guitar, lead guitar (1–9)
- Max Middleton – grand piano (1–3, 5, 7–9), keyboards (6), Rhodes (10–12), string arrangements
- Anthony Drennan – nylon guitar (2, 5, 9, 10), dobro (2, 4), acoustic guitar (4, 8, 10), jazz guitar (7), guitars (11)
- Robert Ahwai – bass (1–11)
- Martin Ditcham – drums (1–11), percussion (1–11)
- The Kick Horns – horn arrangements
- Simon Clarke – alto saxophone, baritone saxophone
- Tim Sanders – tenor saxophone
- Kenny Hamilton – bass trombone
- J. Neil Sidwell – trombone
- Rick Taylor – trombone
- Roddy Lorimer – trumpet, flugelhorn
- Paul Spong – trumpet, flugelhorn
- Nick Hitchens – tuba
- Gavyn Wright – orchestra leader
- Carol Kenyon – backing vocals
- Linda Taylor – backing vocals

=== Production ===
- Jon Kelly – producer
- John Mackswith – engineer
- Justin Shirley-Smith – engineer
- Russell Shaw – engineer
- Willie Grimston – production coordination
- Alan Fearnley – paintings

== Charts ==
Chart (1991)	Peak position
Australian Albums Chart	53
Austrian Albums Chart	5
Canada Top Albums/CDs (RPM)	25
French Albums Chart	19
Dutch Albums Chart	9
German Albums Chart	1
Hungarian Albums (MAHASZ)	12
Norwegian Albums Chart	3
Swedish Albums Chart	5
Swiss Albums Chart	2
UK Albums Chart	1
US Billboard 200	176

== Certifications ==
Region	Certification	Certified units/sales
Austria (IFPI Austria)	Gold	25,000^{*}
Finland (Musiikkituottajat)	Gold	36,000
France (SNEP)	2× Gold	200,000^{*}
Germany (BVMI)	Platinum	500,000^{^}
Netherlands (NVPI)	Gold	50,000^{^}
Switzerland (IFPI Switzerland)	Platinum	50,000^{^}
United Kingdom (BPI)	2× Platinum	600,000^{^}
^{*} Sales figures based on certification alone.^{^} Shipments figures based on certification alone.
