= Jan Ravens =

British comedian

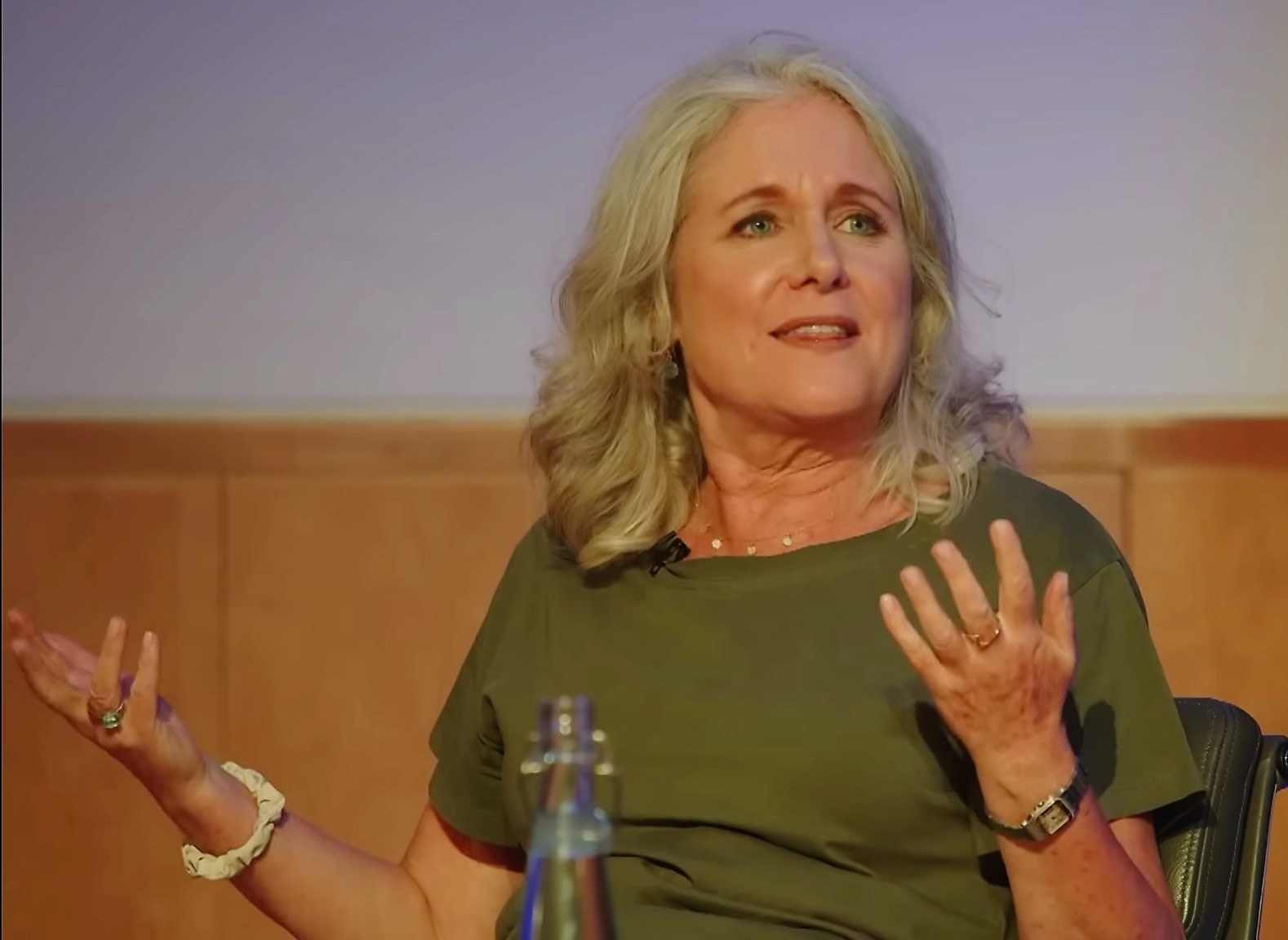
- Ravens at the British Library in 2022
- Born: Janet Ravens; 14 May 1958 (age 68); Bebington, England
- Education: Homerton College, Cambridge (BA)
- Occupation: Actress
- Years active: 1983–present
- Spouses: Steve Brown (m. 1983; div. 1993) Max Hole (m. 1999)
- Children: 3, including Alfie

Janet Ravens (born 14 May 1958) is a British actress and impressionist, known for her voice work on Spitting Image and Dead Ringers.

== Early life ==
Ravens grew up in Hoylake, then in Cheshire, on the west side of the Wirral with her father, a local government clerk, and her mother, a nurse. She attended West Kirby Grammar School for Girls, where BBC Radio 4 presenter Sheila McClennon (You and Yours) was two years below her. She read education studies and drama at Homerton College, Cambridge, and was the first female president of Cambridge University Footlights Club in 1979–80.

== Career ==
After Cambridge, Ravens became a radio comedy producer. Her first television role was in the ITV series, Just Amazing. She joined Jasper Carrott's comedy, Carrott's Lib, in 1983. In 1986, she played the heavily pregnant Vanessa Plowright in the "Tourists" episode of Farrington of the F.O. (broadcast 13 March). In 1986, she accompanied then-husband Steve Brown on the Capital Radio satirical show Brunch, along with DJs Paul Burnett, Roger Scott and comedians Angus Deayton and Jeremy Pascall. In 1994, she spent a year with the RSC. She has done much voice-over work, being the Cadbury's Caramel bunny for several years, and was the seductive voice of a can of apple Tango. She has also appeared on Just a Minute and I'm Sorry I Haven't a Clue on Radio 4, Whose Line Is It Anyway?, Have I Got News for You, No Frills, Alexei Sayle's Stuff and in Dictionary Corner on Channel 4's Countdown (one of the shows parodied on Dead Ringers). She was producer of the Radio 4 comedy Elephants to Catch Eels.

=== Repertoire ===
Ravens has regularly imitated Newsnight host Kirsty Wark, Charlotte Green formerly of BBC Radio 4 (with double entendres), Ellen MacArthur (who regularly bursts into tears), Nigella Lawson (with double entendres), Ann Widdecombe (narrating fanciful racy storylines in her novels), Patricia Routledge's Hyacinth Bucket, Queen Elizabeth II, a chirpy Sandi Toksvig, a stern-faced Gillian McKeith, Sophie Raworth (with a bemused school-girl grin) and Fiona Bruce (with barely concealed filthy invitations) of BBC News, Anne Robinson of The Weakest Link, Lesley Garrett (often referring to her generous cleavage), Hillary Clinton, Theresa May, Liz Truss and the Geordie-accented Ruth Archer from the BBC Radio 4 series The Archers. She also appeared as the then Prime Minister Margaret Thatcher in an episode of Are You Being Served? although only her voice is heard.

=== Other television ===
Ravens appeared in a series-three episode ("Monday Morning will be Fine") of David Renwick's series One Foot in the Grave as Pat Aylesbury, one of the neighbours to whom Meldrew turns after being burgled. From 1996 till 2001, she played Janet Grimley, the mother in The Grimleys, a nostalgic sitcom set in 1970s Dudley.

In autumn 2006, Ravens appeared on the BBC entertainment programme Strictly Come Dancing partnered with Anton Du Beke. She was eliminated in the fifth week.

In spring 2007, she appeared on the BBC's The Truth About Food, exploring how foods affect behaviour. Also in 2007, she appeared in Ronni Ancona's comedy sketch show, Ronni Ancona & Co.

She won the edition of Celebrity Mastermind on 1 January 2008, the second woman to win, Edwina Currie having been the first. Ravens appeared as Effy's art teacher in E4 drama Skins.

In February 2010 and November 2017, she was a panellist on QI, and in 2012 appeared as Susan in the sitcom Hebburn.

=== Radio ===
In late 2016, Ravens featured in the BBC Radio 4 miniseries Desolation Jests alongside David Jason, Rory Bremner and John Bird. The four-part show was written by David Renwick.

== Personal life ==
Ravens's first husband was composer Steve Brown but the couple divorced in 1993. She married the vice-president of Universal Music Group, Max Hole, in July 1999 in Richmond upon Thames. She lives in Barnes. She has three sons: Alfie and Lenny by her first husband, born in April 1987 and January 1991, and Louis by her second, born in June 1998.

She is an ambassador for the charity ActionAid and has visited Kenya with the organisation and raised money for it on Celebrity Mastermind.
