= Shishawa =

Shishāwa شیش آوه Shishābah (Persian: شش آبه)
- Village
- Location in Afghanistan
- Coordinates: 31°30′27″N 62°42′01″E
- Country: Afghanistan
- Province: Nimruz Province
- District: Khashrowd District
- Elevation: 568 m (1,864 ft)

Population (2017)
  - Total: 3,000
- Time zone: UTC+4:30
- Main languages: Balochi

The Shishāwa (Balochi: شیش آوه), Shishābah (Persian: شش آبه) is a village in Khash Rod district of Nimroz Province, in western Afghanistan. This village located on the right bank of the Khash Rud River and about 8 miles west of Khash village. Per G.P. Tate information in 1904 year, this village was the residence of Akbar Khan, Baluch, Uzbakzai tribes, and in that time there were number of There are 110 families forming 12 ghani pagos. Also, it is said, there was enough waste land near the village to find work for 40 pagos.

== See also ==
- Uzbakzai
- Shesh Aba raid
- Shishawa Rod
- Dasht-e Shesh Ābeh
