= Charles Haddon-Cave =

British judge (born 1956)

The Right Honourable Lord Justice Haddon-Cave
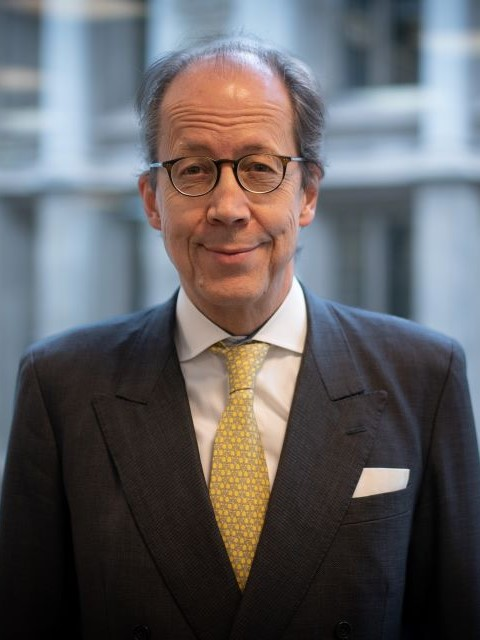

Lord Justice of Appeal
- Incumbent
- Assumed office 2018
- Monarchs: Elizabeth II; Charles III

High Court Judge Queen's Bench Division
- In office 2011–2018

Personal details
- Born: 20 March 1956 (age 70) United Kingdom
- Education: Pembroke College, Cambridge

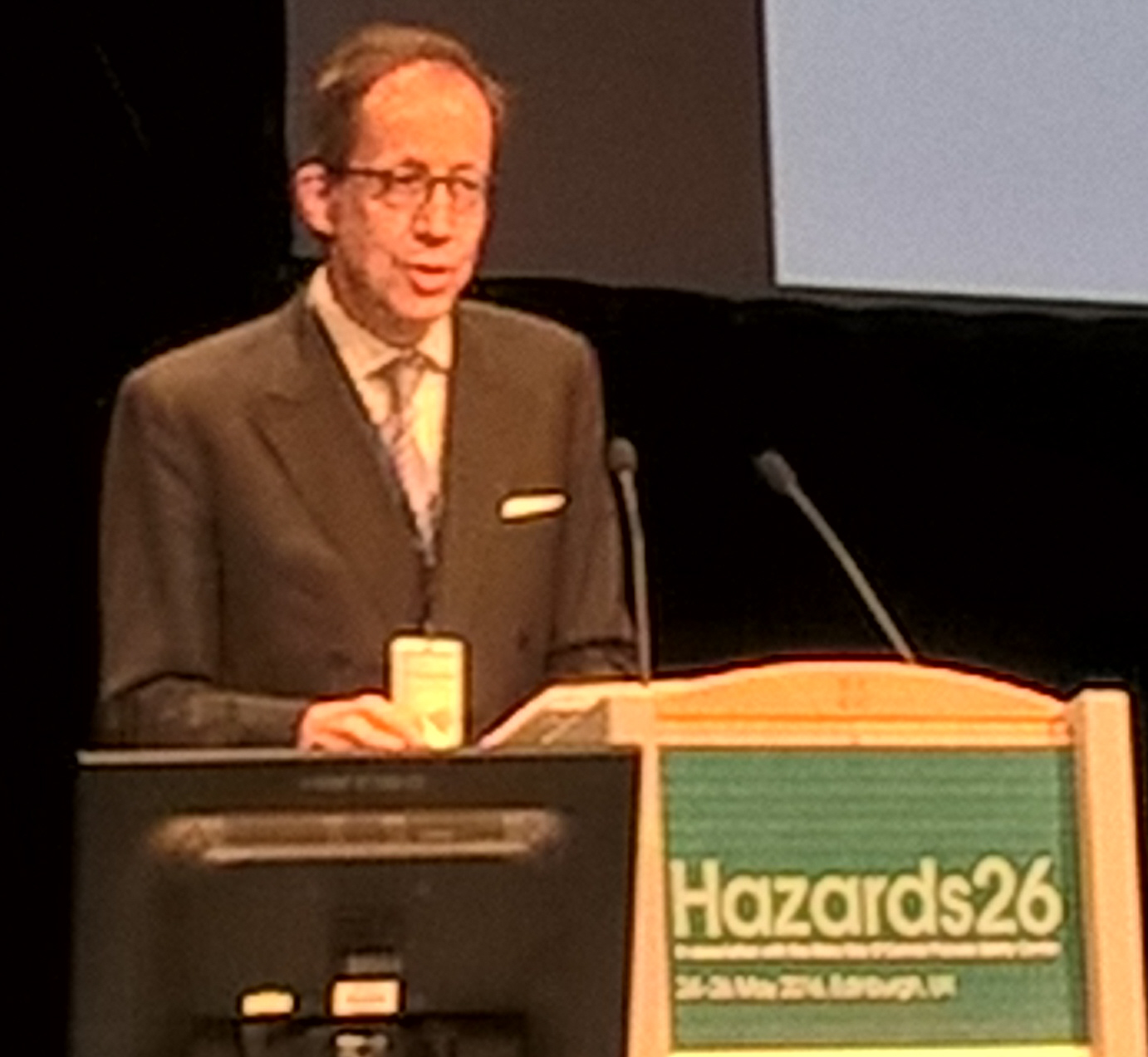
Charles Haddon-Cave giving the keynote lecture at the Hazards 26 Conference in Edinburgh, 24 May 2016.

Sir Charles Anthony Haddon-Cave (born 20 March 1956), styled The Rt Hon Lord Justice Haddon-Cave, is a British judge of the Court of Appeal of England and Wales and served as the Senior Presiding Judge for England and Wales from 2021 to 2022.

== Family life ==
Haddon-Cave is the son of Sir Charles Philip Haddon-Cave, Chief Secretary of Hong Kong between 1981 and 1985, and elder brother of Francis, who was called to the Hong Kong bar in 1999. He is an uncle of the actresses Jessie Cave and Bebe Cave.

== Career ==
Haddon-Cave was educated at The King's School, Canterbury and Pembroke College, Cambridge. He was called to the Bar (Gray's Inn) in 1978, and elected a bencher in 2003. He was also called to the Bar in Hong Kong in 1980. Haddon-Cave took silk in 1999, and served as an assistant recorder from 1998 to 2000. He then served as a recorder until his appointment to the High Court on 31 October 2011, upon which occasion he was knighted.

Haddon-Cave led a review into the 2006 RAF Nimrod crash.

He sentenced the Parsons Green bomber to a minimum of 34 years in prison in 2018. He said, "You will have plenty of time to study the Koran in Prison… the Koran is a book of peace… Islam forbids breaking the law of the land…..Islam forbids terror." He was appointed to the Court of Appeal in 2018. He was sworn as a member of the Privy Council of the United Kingdom in 2018, giving him the honorific title "The Right Honourable".

He is the chair of the 2023 Afghan Unlawful Killings inquiry.

== See also ==
- List of High Court judges of England and Wales
- Parsons Green train bombing
