= God's Great Banana Skin =

Studio album by Chris Rea
- Released: 2 November 1992
- Recorded: April–August 1992
- Genre: Album-oriented rock
- Length: 55:55
- Label: East West
- Producer: Chris Rea

Chris Rea chronology
Auberge (1991)	God's Great Banana Skin (1992)	Espresso Logic (1993)

Music video
- "Nothing to Fear" (1992) on YouTube

God's Great Banana Skin is the twelfth studio album by British singer-songwriter Chris Rea, released in November 1992. The album was not released in the United States, though some tracks later appeared on the US release of Rea's following album Espresso Logic. The single "Nothing to Fear" reached number 16 in the UK Singles Chart, and its music video was filmed in Morocco. The album reached number 4 in the UK Albums Chart in 1992.

The song "Too Much Pride" was featured in the 1993 erotic thriller, Cold Sweat.

== Critical reception ==
Professional ratings
Review scores
Source	Rating
AllMusic	3/5 stars
Calgary Herald	C+

The Guardian wrote: "In the snug world of centrally-heated adult rock, Chris Rea offers a reminder that he plays a handy slide-guitar, and creates chunky chordscapes which perfectly complement the gravelly rasp of his voice."

== Track listing ==
All songs written by Chris Rea.

1. "Nothing to Fear" – 9:13
2. "Miles Is a Cigarette" – 4:22
3. "God's Great Banana Skin" – 5:20
4. "90's Blues" – 5:06
5. "Too Much Pride" – 4:27
6. "Boom Boom" – 5:20
7. "I Ain't the Fool" – 4:02
8. "There She Goes" – 4:33
9. "I'm Ready" – 4:54
10. "Black Dog" – 4:10
11. "Soft Top, Hard Shoulder" – 4:22

== Personnel ==
- Chris Rea – vocals, guitars
- Max Middleton – acoustic piano, keyboards
- Robert Ahwai – guitars
- Sylvin Marc – bass
- Martin Ditcham – drums, percussion
- Val Chalmers – backing vocals
- Emma Whittle – backing vocals

=== Production ===
- Chris Rea – producer
- Neil Amor – engineer
- Phillipe Garcia – assistant engineer
- Simon Wall – assistant engineer
- Tommy Willis – guitar technician
- Chris Welch – illustrations
- Paul Lilly – management

Studios

- Recorded at Studio Miraval (Le Var, France)
- Mixed at The Mill (Berkshire, England)

== Charts ==
Chart performance for God's Great Banana Skin
Chart (1992)	Peak position
Austrian Albums (Ö3 Austria)	26
Canada Top Albums/CDs (RPM)	68
Dutch Albums (Album Top 100)	33
German Albums (Offizielle Top 100)	16
Hungarian Albums (MAHASZ)	28
Norwegian Albums (VG-lista)	14
Swedish Albums (Sverigetopplistan)	18
Swiss Albums (Schweizer Hitparade)	16
UK Albums (Official Charts)	4

== Certifications ==
Certifications for God's Great Banana Skin
Region	Certification	Certified units/sales
Germany (BVMI)	Gold	250,000^{^}
Switzerland (IFPI Switzerland)	2× Gold	50,000^{^}
United Kingdom (BPI)	Platinum	300,000^{^}
^{^} Shipments figures based on certification alone.
