= Sheila McClennon =

Sheila McClennon (born 13 May 1960) is a British radio presenter, notable for her work on BBC Radio 4.

== Early life ==
She was born in Clatterbridge, in Wirral (then in Cheshire). She attended West Kirby Grammar School, where Jan Ravens was two years above her. Ravens would later mercilessly impersonate many Radio 4 presenters of You and Yours and Woman's Hour on Dead Ringers.

She gained a degree in English, Drama and American Studies from Manchester University.

== Career ==
She worked in local radio and TV, and presented the Breakfast show on BBC Radio Shropshire from 1985.

=== Radio 4 ===
She has presented Woman's Hour (from 1994) and You and Yours.

== Personal life ==
She married in September 1992 in Birkenhead. She has a daughter (born April 1994) and a son (born February 1997).
