= Alfie Brown =

English comedian and writer

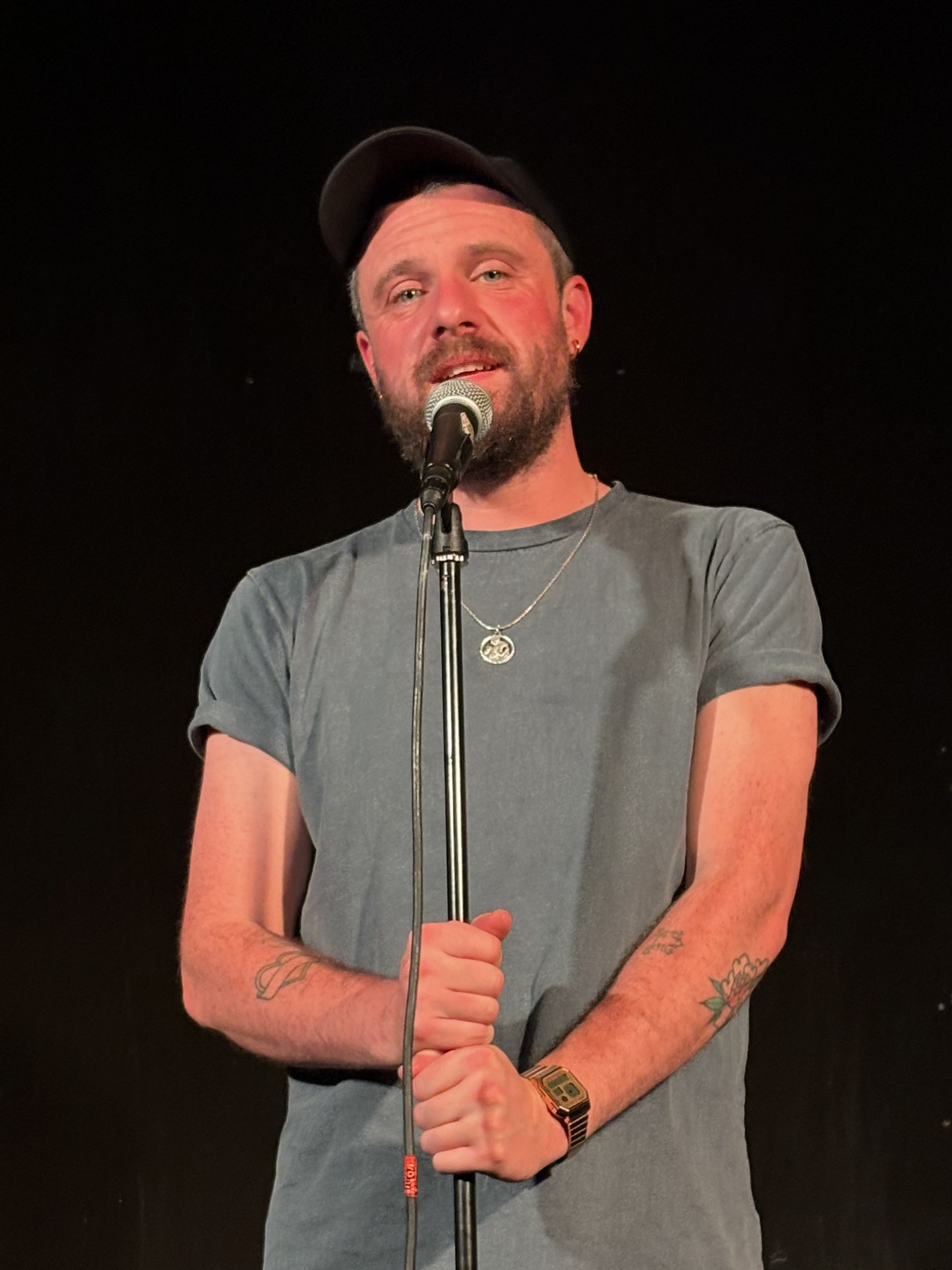
- Partner: Jessie Cave
- Children: 4
- Parents: Jan Ravens; Steve Brown

Comedy career
- Medium: Stand-up
- Genres: Satire, observational

Alfie Brown is an English stand-up comedian. In 2022, he was nominated for the main prize of the Edinburgh Comedy Awards. He is the son of comedian Jan Ravens and writer Steve Brown.

== Personal life ==
Brown is the son of Jan Ravens and Steve Brown. He says he can see his humour in his parents' styles and described "a great team spirit" between them. He attended Sibford School in Oxfordshire.

He is in a relationship with the actress Jessie Cave. They have four children: a son born in October 2014, a daughter born in July 2016, a second son born in October 2020, and a third son born in March 2022. In 2018, the couple took part in Comedy Central's Roast Battle.

== Career ==
Brown started performing comedy in January 2006 at the Laughing Horse New Act of the Year competition. He had left school at 17, and described himself at the time as "the funniest person working in TopShop. He described his influences as George Carlin, Stewart Lee, Bill Hicks and Alexei Sayle. A show in 2012 was described by The Independent as "Stewart Lee's attitude trapped in Russell Brand's body".

He has since become a regular on the UK comedy circuit and at the Edinburgh Fringe Festival, he also started his own improvisational podcast entitled Whatever Works. In 2018, during a break in their relationship, Brown and Cave each performed at the Edinburgh Festival a personal show about their break up. The Evening Standard gave Brown's show Lunatic '4 stars' calling Brown an "intriguing misanthrope" and describing him as a "provocative stand-up" who "has always been painfully honest but often painfully indulgent. This time he is much more focussed".

In 2021, The Guardian described him as a twisty and thoughtful social satirist, and a contrarian, in his show Sensitive Man as they saw "Brown looking askance at complacent twentysomethings 'ostentatiously waving around wads of time'- What a phrase!". The Daily Telegraph was effusive about the show saying "the title of Alfie Brown's new stand-up tour, Sensitive Man, might be the cleverest thing in an hour of very clever things" and "it's a hoot from the outset, partly due to his original turns of phrase." Sensitive Man won best show at the 2022 Chortle Awards.The show was recorded for Amazon Prime at the Soho Theatre. After performing Sensitive Man at the 2022 Edinburgh Festival, Brown was nominated for the main prize of the Edinburgh Comedy Awards. The Times described Brown "made it his business to say the unsayable with.. much wit, control, imagination and playful charm" and "Somehow he both maligns his audience and flatters their intelligence too, keeping the laughs coming as he does so." The comedian Stewart Lee described it as "the best British stand-up I have seen for some years".

In 2022, Brown began co-hosting a new Formula One podcast called "Dirty Air", with fellow comedian and musician Josh Weller.

In 2023, Brown came under fire after making reference to claims of antisemitism within the Labour Party. After doubling down on these comments, it was revealed that Brown had used the N word in 2015 in a routine. Footage also resurfaced of him joking about the Grenfell Tower fire in 2017.

In August 2024, he was nominated for Best Show by the ISH Edinburgh Comedy Awards.
