= Ghurghuri =

Ghurghuri غرغری Ghorghori
- Town
- Location
- Coordinates: 31°26′51″N 62°37′50″E
- Country: Afghanistan
- Province: Nimruz
- District: Khashrod
- Elevation: 553 m (1,814 ft)
- Time zone: UTC+04:30 (Afghanistan Time)

Ghurghuri (Dari/Pashto: غرغری) also spelled Ghorghori, is a town that serves as the capital of Khashrod District of Nimruz Province in southwestern Afghanistan.

== History ==
Ghorghori is a historical place northwest of Khash village in Khashrod District, which in historical sources was (قرنین) Qornain or Qor Qor, which in the local dialect of Persian language is pronounced as Ghornain or Ghor Ghori Qornain.

Ya'qub ibn al-Layth the founder of the Saffarid dynasty of Sistan, with its capital at Zaranj, was born in 840, of eastern Iranian origins, in a small town called Qornain (From Arabic), which was located east of Zaranj and west of Bost, near Khash village in what is now Afghanistan.

In 2025, Taliban authorities announced plans to gradually move the provincial capital from Zaranj to Ghurghuri.

== Climate ==
Ghorghori has a hot desert climate (Köppen BWh), characterised by little precipitation and high variation between summer and winter temperatures. The average temperature in Khash is 21.4 °C, while the annual precipitation averages 62 mm. July is the hottest month of the year with an average temperature of 34.4 °C. The coldest month January has an average temperature of 8.0 °C.

Climate data for Ghorghori
Month	Jan	Feb	Mar	Apr	May	Jun	Jul	Aug	Sep	Oct	Nov	Dec	Year
Mean daily maximum °C (°F)	15.4 (59.7)	18.6 (65.5)	24.9 (76.8)	30.9 (87.6)	36.5 (97.7)	42.0 (107.6)	42.7 (108.9)	41.3 (106.3)	36.6 (97.9)	30.8 (87.4)	23.2 (73.8)	17.7 (63.9)	30.1 (86.1)
Daily mean °C (°F)	8.0 (46.4)	11.1 (52.0)	16.8 (62.2)	22.5 (72.5)	27.7 (81.9)	32.8 (91.0)	34.4 (93.9)	32.4 (90.3)	27.0 (80.6)	21.0 (69.8)	13.7 (56.7)	9.1 (48.4)	21.4 (70.5)
Mean daily minimum °C (°F)	0.7 (33.3)	3.6 (38.5)	8.8 (47.8)	14.1 (57.4)	19.0 (66.2)	23.7 (74.7)	26.1 (79.0)	23.5 (74.3)	17.5 (63.5)	11.2 (52.2)	4.3 (39.7)	0.5 (32.9)	12.8 (55.0)
Source: Climate-Data.org
