= Alan Fearnley =

- Born: 1942 (age 82–83); Yorkshire, England
- Education: Batley College of Art
- Known for: Painting
- Awards: B.A.C. Trophy and Qantas Trophy (1974)

Alan Fearnley is a British artist known for his painting of cars and trains.

== Biography ==
Fearnley was born in 1942 in Yorkshire and studied at Batley College of Art. After college, he worked for several years as an illustrator in a commercial studio, after which he began to work independently. In 1974, Fearnley became a member of the Aviation Artists Guild and was awarded the B.A.C. Trophy and Qantas Trophy for works dedicated to aviation. A little later, Fearnley joined the Guild of Railway Artists and the Royal Society marine painters. But classic and sports cars became an important source of creativity for Fearnley over the next twenty-five years. He has created more than a hundred paintings on this subject, more than 70,000 copies of his work have been sold around the world, and three books have been published dedicated to Fearnley's work. The artist paints most of his paintings in the style of impressionism, using oil and acrylic paints. Later, his most famous canvases became the beginning for prints, posters, albums, calendars.

Fearnley is one of the foremost automotive artists. His paintings are kept in the best private collections, and solo exhibitions are always shown in Monaco, during the Formula 1 Grand Prix. Fearnley-inspired merchandise, autographed by drivers and team leaders, is a welcome purchase for motorsport enthusiasts. The management of Mercedes-Benz became interested in Fearnley's paintings, later the company released a specially published album of his work for their customers. At various times, a series of works by the artist dedicated to racing cars Scuderia Ferrari, including a portrait of Enzo Ferrari, and racing at Le Mans.

== Additional information ==
One of Fearnley's paintings gained particular notoriety as the cover for Chris Rea's eleventh studio album, Auberge. The picture shows the Caterham Super Seven, the Blue Seven, the owner of which was the pop musician himself and which can also be seen in the video of the same name.

== Bibliography ==
- «The Railway Paintings of Alan Fearnley» (1987). ISBN 978-0715390887.
- «The Classic Car Paintings of Alan Fearnley» (2001). ISBN 9781870586429.
- «The Automotive Art of Alan Fearnley» (2007). ISBN 9780955656477.

== See also ==
- Auberge (album)
