= Winifred Robinson =

British radio presenter and journalist

Winifred Robinson (born 7 December 1957) is a BBC Radio presenter of the You and Yours programme.

== Early life ==
Robinson was born in Liverpool, the fourth of six daughters of a docker and a housewife. She attended Notre Dame Collegiate School (now Notre Dame Catholic College), a girls' Roman Catholic grammar school in Everton Valley.

In 1979, she graduated from Liverpool University with a degree in English.

== Career ==
Robinson began her career at the Catholic Pictorial, and then the Ormskirk Advertiser newspaper. Her first job in broadcasting was in the newsroom at the original BRMB Radio in Birmingham, later moving to Red Rose Radio in Preston and the local television news BBC North West Tonight. She has also presented File on 4. Robinson became a reporter on the BBC Radio 4 Today programme in 1995, and briefly was a presenter, but was reportedly 'passed over' because of her Liverpool accent, an accusation the BBC has denied, and Sarah Montague was appointed.

Robinson joined You and Yours, but continues to present documentaries on social issues, an area she previously tackled as a Today reporter. In 2007 Robinson revisited the Norris Green housing estate in Liverpool, where she spent most of her formative years, for a radio documentary, examining problems the area faced. Robinson has also written for the Daily Mail and The Independent newspapers.

On 9 January 2018, Robinson was removed for the day as You and Yours presenter as she had tweeted support for Carrie Gracie, the BBC's former China editor, who resigned from the post. The BBC said it had replaced Robinson from the programme due to impartiality issues.

On 8 October 2026, the BBC announced it would be "cutting a raft of Radio 4 programmes including the long-running consumer and social affairs show You and Yours".
