= Peter White (broadcaster) =

Visually impaired British broadcast journalist

Peter White MBE (born 1947, Winchester) is a visually impaired British broadcast journalist and DJ.

== Early life and career ==
White was born in Winchester, Hampshire. Blind since birth (as was his elder brother), he attended New College Worcester, which was then known as the Worcester College for the Blind. He was a regular presenter on BBC Radio Solent from the station's launch in 1971 until November 2006, when he was downsized.

He currently co-presents, for BBC Radio 4, You and Yours and since 1974 In Touch, a programme for blind and partially sighted people. He also regularly contributes to other science, news or educational programmes to talk about disabilities. He was the presenter of Channel 4's Same Difference (1987–1989) and Central Television's Link (1989–1991). He was made the BBC's Disability Affairs Correspondent in 1995. He was part of the reporting team for BBC News at the 2008 Summer Paralympics in Beijing. White wrote a column for The Guardian 'G2' magazine which appeared on 8 September 2006.

== Charity work ==
On 13 March 2009 White participated in Radio 4's Stand Up With The Stars, a competition for Red Nose Day 2009 where well-known, serious presenters from Radio 4 (including Evan Davis, Libby Purves and Laurie Taylor), attempted to make and deliver a stand-up comedy routine, mentored by other well-known Radio 4 comedy presenters. White won after a vote from Radio 4 listeners. Much of his routine focused on his blindness and others' perceptions of blind people.

In February 2011, White took part in a 100 km (62 mi) trek across the Kaisut Desert in North Kenya for Comic Relief to raise awareness of Africans losing their sight to diseases like glaucoma. Despite painful blisters he finished the challenges, crossing the line first with actress Kara Tointon. The feat raised £1,375,037.

== Awards and achievements ==
- 1988: appointed Member of the Order of the British Empire (MBE)
- 1999: published his autobiography, See It My Way
- 2001: awarded Sony Speech Broadcaster of the Year 2001
- 2002: awarded Viv Bradford Rose Bowl by Warwickshire Association for the Blind

On 17 November 2023 White was the guest for BBC Radio 4's Desert Island Discs, where his choices included "Somebody Who Loves You" by Joan Armatrading, "Badge" by Cream and "Albatross" by Judy Collins.
