= Looking for the Summer =

1991 single by Chris Rea

Single by Chris Rea

from the album Auberge
- B-side: "Six Up"
- Released: 10 June 1991
- Length: 5:03 (album version); 3:51 (single version)
- Label: EastWest
- Songwriter: Chris Rea
- Producer: Jon Kelly

Chris Rea singles chronology
"Heaven" (1991)	"Looking for the Summer" (1991)	"Winter Song" (1991)

Music video
- "Looking for the Summer (album version)" on YouTube

"Looking for the Summer" is a song by British singer-songwriter Chris Rea, released on 10 June 1991 by EastWest Records as the third single from his eleventh studio album, Auberge (1991). It was written by Rea and produced by Jon Kelly. "Looking for the Summer" reached No. 49 in the UK and remained in the charts for three weeks. A music video was filmed to promote the single. It also featured in a diner scene in the 1992 Hollywood blockbuster Basic Instinct.

== Background ==
In a 1991 interview with Dennis Elsas, Rea described the song's lyrical message: "The idea is fundamentally a guy is looking at his daughter, who is now just about in her teenage years and he sees her turn away. She's looking to her summer, she's spring looking for the summer, and he, then in autumn, looks back and remembers what it was like when he also looked for his summer. The third verse reminds his wife how they hurt each other's growing pains, while they both looked for their summers, and in many ways he still looks for his summer."

== Critical reception ==
In a review of Auberge, Deborah Hornblow of The Hartford Courant considered the song as one of the album's "better tracks", and noted the song is "infused with a wide-openness and yearning by the strains of Rea's fine guitar work". Adam Sweeting of The Guardian commented: "Song titles like "Looking for the Summer" are accurate guides to their contents."

Johnny Loftus of AllMusic recommended the song by labelling it an AMG Pick Track. In a 2017 concert review, Andrew Steel of Yorkshire Evening Post described the song as a "classic" and added: "The soft-rock gems of "Julia" and "Looking for the Summer" are smart, lithe numbers possessed of a foot-tapping joy underneath his husky vocals, rugged and languorous."

== Track listings ==
- 7-inch single
1. "Looking for the Summer" (Remix) – 3:51
2. "Six Up" – 4:06
- 12-inch single
1. "Looking for the Summer" (Remix) – 3:51
2. "Six Up" – 4:06
3. "Urban Samurai" – 4:27
- Cassette single
1. "Looking for the Summer" (Remix) – 3:51
2. "Six Up" – 4:06
- CD single
1. "Looking for the Summer" (Remix) – 3:54
2. "Six Up" – 4:08
3. "Theme From the Pantile Journals" – 4:13
4. "Teach Me to Dance" – 4:05

== Personnel ==
- Chris Rea - guitar, slide guitar, Hammond organ
- Anthony Drennan - nylon guitar, acoustic guitar
- Max Middleton - Rhodes
- Robert Ahwai - bass
- Martin Ditcham - drums, percussion

Production

- Jon Kelly - producer
- Chris Rea, Dave Richards - producers of "Urban Samurai"
- Justin Shirley-Smith - engineer
- Russell Shaw - assistant engineer

Other

- Lewis Edwards - sleeve painting

== Charts ==
Chart (1991)	Peak position
Belgium (Ultratop Flanders)	39
Europe (European Hit Radio)	24
Germany (Official German Charts)	51
Netherlands (Single Top 100)	37
UK Singles Chart (OCC)	49
UK Airplay (Music Week)	21
