= Uzbakzai =

Balochi tribe

Uzbakzai (Balochi: اوزبکزی) or Uzbakzahi (Balochi: اوزبکزهی) a Baloch tribe, which is a subset of Rakhshani tribe living in Afghanistan, Iran and Pakistan. In Afghanistan the main place of Uzbakzai tribe is Shishawa village in Khash Rod and Qazi village in Chakhansour districts of Nimroz province, and Karez Latif village in Anardara district of Farah province.

== Languages ==
The most of Uzbakzai tribe speak in Rakhshani dialect of Balochi language which is the most spoken dialect in Sistan and Baluchistan. Also, Uzbakzai people speak in Brahui, Dari/ Persian and Pashto languages.
