= Bebe Cave =

English actress (born 1997)

- Born: 22 July 1997 (age 29); London, England
- Occupation: Actress
- Years active: 2008–present
- Relatives: Jessie Cave (sister)

Bebe Cave (born 22 July 1997) is an English actress.

== Early life ==
Cave was born 22 July 1997 in London, England, the youngest of five siblings, to two general practitioners. Her older sister Jessie Cave is an actress and comedian.

== Career ==
Cave made her acting debut in 2009 in the made-for-television movie called May Contain Nuts. In 2012, Cave was cast as Young Biddy alongside her sister in the 2012 film Great Expectations. In 2013, she starred opposite Helen Mirren in the 2013 play The Audience. The Daily Telegraph described her as a "revelation" who gives a "performance of blistering pathos and real comic punch." She was cast in Tale of Tales by director Matteo Garrone after seeing her appear in a YouTube red carpet interview. She starred in Tom Rosenthal's 2019 music video, "You Might Find Yours."

In 2021, Cave narrated the audiobook for sister Jessie's debut novel, Sunset, and was included in the Publisher's Association Best New Voices 2021 list for her narration. The novel was partly inspired by their relationship.

In 2022, Cave returned to stage in Daddy Issues at the Seven Dials Playhouse. In 2024, Cave made her solo show debut at the Edinburgh Comedy Festival with her one-woman show, The Screen Test, having previously appeared in her sister's first Edinburgh show Bookworm in 2012.

== Personal life ==
As of 2026, she is in a relationship with comedian and podcaster Horatio Gould.

== Filmography ==
=== Film ===
Year	Title	Role	Notes
2012	Great Expectations	Young Biddy	
2015	Tale of Tales	Violet	
2017	On Chesil Beach	Ruth Ponting	
2018	Agatha and the Truth of Murder	Daphne	
2025	The Running Man	Shake Shack Cashier	

=== Television ===
Year	Title	Role	Notes
2009	May Contain Nuts	Molly	Television film
2012	Mrs Biggs	Gillian Powell	1 episode
2013	Frankie	Hope	4 episodes
2014	Trying Again	Millie	4 episodes
2015	Cider with Rosie	Doth	Television film
2017	Victoria	Wilhelmina Coke	9 episodes
2018	Hang Ups	Issy Pitt	6 episodes
2021	This Time With Alan Partridge	Juno	Episode 5
2023	Star Wars: Visions	Julan Van Reeple (voice)	Episode: "I Am Your Mother"

=== Theatre ===
Year	Title	Role	Notes
2013	The Audience	Princess Elizabeth	
