= Winter Song (Chris Rea song) =

1991 single by Chris Rea

Single by Chris Rea

from the album Auberge
- Released: 28 October 1991
- Length: 4:35
- Label: East West
- Songwriter: Chris Rea
- Producer: Jon Kelly

Chris Rea singles chronology
"Looking for the Summer" (1991)	"Winter Song" (1991)	"Nothing to Fear" (1992)

Music video
- "Winter Song" on YouTube

"Winter Song" is a song by British singer-songwriter Chris Rea, released on 28 October 1991 as an extended play and as a track on the European edition of his eleventh studio album, Auberge. "Winter Song" was written by Rea and produced by Jon Kelly. The EP, which was released to coincide with Rea's current tour of Britain, reached No. 27 on the UK Singles Chart and No. 30 in the Irish Singles Chart.

== Critical reception ==
Upon its release, Music & Media wrote, "Rea has a good sense of the seasons. His last single was called 'Looking for the Summer', and now he reclaims his spot around the fireplace with this pleasant Dire Straits-like folk song." Gavin Martin of NME selected it as one of the "singles of the week" and commented, "The languorous pace and parched throaty rasp that worked wonders on the eerie evocation of 'Texas' basks in its full glory here. This is a gorgeous homily to fit the shortening days and the yearning heart. Rea takes his time and doesn't crowd out the mix." Jim Lawn of the Lennox Herald stated, "This single will certainly provide Rea with another hit. As winter and Christmas close in on us this single should fit the mood of the season." Peter Kinghorn of the Evening Chronicle described the song as a "superb" and "expressive" ballad.

== Track listings ==
7-inch single (UK)

1. "Winter Song" – 4:35
2. "Footprints in the Snow" – 4:23
3. "Tell Me There's a Heaven" – 6:04

7-inch single (Germany and France)

1. "Winter Song" – 4:35
2. "Footprints in the Snow" – 4:23
3. "Set Me Free" – 5:38

CD single (UK and Europe)

1. "Winter Song" – 4:35
2. "Footprints in the Snow" – 4:23
3. "Tell Me There's a Heaven" – 6:04
4. "True to You" – 3:58

CD single (Germany)

1. "Winter Song" – 4:35
2. "Footprints in the Snow" – 4:23
3. "Set Me Free" – 5:38
4. "True to You" – 3:58

== Personnel ==
"Winter Song"

- Chris Rea – guitar, slide guitar, Hammond organ
- Max Middleton – keyboards
- Robert Ahwai – bass
- Martin Ditcham – drums, percussion

Production

- Jon Kelly – producer (all tracks)
- Chris Rea – producer ("Tell Me There's a Heaven")
- Justin Shirley-Smith – engineer ("Winter Song")
- Russell Shaw – additional engineer ("Winter Song")

Other

- Stephen Sandon – individual photography
- Simon Fowler – background photography
- Stylorouge – design

== Charts ==
Chart (1991)	Peak position
Europe (Eurochart Hot 100)	75
Ireland (IRMA)	30
UK Singles (OCC)	27
UK Airplay (Music Week)	36
