= Lukhi, Qalandarabad =

Lukhi لوخي
- Village
- Location within Iran
- Coordinates: 35°30′11″N 59°51′19″E
- Country: Iran
- Province: Razavi Khorasan
- County: Fariman
- Bakhsh: Qalandarabad
- Rural District: Qalandarabad

Population (2006)
  - Total: 35
- Time zone: UTC+3:30 (IRST)
  - Summer (DST): UTC+4:30 (IRDT)

Lukhi (Persian: لوخي, also romanized as Lūkhī) is a village in Qalandarabad Rural District, Qalandarabad District, Fariman County, Razavi Khorasan Province, Iran. According to the 2006 census its population was 35, in 8 families.
