= Jeremy Pascall =

Jeremy Pascall (born Jeremy James Zuppinger; 1946 – 30 August 2001) was an English screenwriter, broadcaster, journalist and author.

He specialized in writing about humour and rock music, starting his career at the magazine New Musical Express. At 26 he moved on to be a producer at London's Capital Radio. He has written several books.

He died on 30 August 2001 from throat cancer.

== Works ==
- The Illustrated History of Rock Music
- The Movies from 1930 to the present
- The Uncyclopaedia of Rock
- God - the Ultimate Autobiography, Angus and Robertson, London, 1987, ISBN 0-207-15684-0
- Story of Rock: Rock 'n Roll Is Here To Stay, Phoebus Publishing Co., New York, 1973/76
