= John Pidgeon (writer) =

William John Gilmour Pidgeon (1 March 1947 – 19 July 2016) was a British journalist, author, music historian, radio producer, comedy executive and crossword compiler.

== Early life and career ==
One of three children, Pidgeon's parents were Frederick "Joe" Pidgeon, an engineer in the civil service, and Margaret Rawson. He was born in Carlisle, Cumberland, and brought up in Downley, a village in Buckinghamshire. While a pupil at the Royal Grammar School, High Wycombe, his time there overlapped with Ian Dury and Roger Scruton. He studied French at the University of Kent and undertook postgraduate Film Studies under Thorold Dickinson at the Slade School, where his writing career began with a review of Carry On Henry for the British Film Institute's Monthly Film Bulletin. An uncredited script for a BBC 2 Film Night special on pop movies followed, and in July 1972 he began a weekly film guide for New Musical Express.

== Music writing and radio ==
Around the same time he was invited to join the team about to launch Let It Rock magazine by Charlie Gillett, who subsequently recommended him as a scriptwriter for BBC Radio 1's The Story of Pop. In December 1972, he joined The Faces' road crew for the band's UK tour in order to write a roadie's diary, which appeared in Let It Rock and America's Creem magazine. His association with the band led not only to 1976's Rod Stewart and the Changing Faces, a book which Paul Gorman has suggested "broke the mould in terms of music books in the 70s," but to a songwriting partnership with keyboard player Ian McLagan. A Backpages Classics Kindle edition of Rod Stewart and the Changing Faces was published in 2011.

In 1973 he took over as editor of Let It Rock, while continuing to write for NME and script documentaries for Radio 1. He wrote a "savagely readable" novelisation of Slade in Flame, which paid scant attention to the screenplay and was withdrawn from sale at cinemas where the film was shown in 1975 for its bad language and explicit violence. Slade's Noddy Holder nevertheless called it "a great book", suggesting John "must have been around the scene for quite a while, he knows a hell of a lot." Then, drawing on his teenage experiences of the British R&B scene for early material, John became the first biographer of Eric Clapton.

An occasional contributor to Time Out, for whom he interviewed his football hero Stan Bowles, Pidgeon followed editor Richard Williams to Melody Maker, where he championed The Police, accompanying the trio on their first US tour, as he did almost 30 years later during their reunion.

By the end of the decade, Pidgeon was back in radio, making documentaries and special programmes for Capital Radio, whose Head of Music was The Story of Pop's producer Tim Blackmore. Pidgeon devised two long-running series – Jukebox Saturday Night and The View From The Top – for disc jockey Roger Scott, and when Scott moved to Radio 1 in 1988, he devised Classic Albums, which he and Scott produced as the network's first independent production. After Scott died of cancer in October 1989, Richard Skinner took over as presenter, and more than fifty programmes were aired around the world.

== Radio comedy ==
Having produced and written sketches for Capital's Brunch, the first programme on British radio to use the zoo format, whose regular performers included Steve Coogan, Angus Deayton and Jan Ravens, he broadened his radio output with comedy documentaries and four series of Talking Comedy for BBC Radio 2 which featured Bill Bailey, Harry Hill and Graham Norton.

In 1999, Pidgeon was approached by the BBC to run Radio Entertainment, which he did for six years, nurturing Dead Ringers, Flight of The Conchords, Little Britain and The Mighty Boosh during his time in charge. He was appointed a Fellow of the Radio Academy in 2003 and chaired the Perrier Panel in Edinburgh in 2005.

One of Pidgeon's first recruits to Radio Entertainment was Danny Wallace, then a recent graduate, who quickly became a trainee producer. In 2008, asked who in the media he most admired and why, Wallace answered, "Jonathan Ross for pioneering and quick wit. Terry Wogan for reassurance and warmth. And John Pidgeon, my mentor at the BBC – a finer and more creative man you're not likely to meet."

== Crossword compiler ==
In 2010, Pidgeon fulfilled a long-held ambition, when he began compiling crosswords for The Daily Telegraph, where his Toughie puzzles are attributed to Petitjean. According to one contributor to Big Dave's Crossword Blog, "I always consider that I need to put a 'slightly mad' hat on in order to solve a Petitjean crossword." His last Toughie (his 74th) appeared on 7 July. His cryptic and quick puzzles on the back page of the newspaper first appeared in March 2011 and the 87th and last was published at the end of June 2016.

== Collections ==
The University of Kent holds material by Pidgeon as part of the British Stand-Up Comedy Archive. The archive comprises audio-visual material, including radio interviews with comedians and published recordings of shows.
