= Lukhi, Khash Rod =

Lukhi لوخی
- Village
- Location in Afghanistan
- Coordinates: 31°37′24″N 62°52′46″E
- Country: Afghanistan
- Province: Nimruz Province
- District: Khash Rod
- Elevation: 602 m (1,975 ft)

Population
  - Total: 3,000
- Time zone: + 4.30

Lukhi (Persian: لوخی), sometimes called Lokhi, is a village in Khash Rod district of Nimroz Province, in western Afghanistan and former district capital of Khash Rod district and also was Alaqadari of Khashrod.
