= Khash, Nimruz =

Khash خاش
- Village
- Location in Afghanistan
- Coordinates: 31°31′45″N 62°47′26″E
- Country: Afghanistan
- Province: Nimruz
- District: Khashrod
- Elevation: 579 m (1,900 ft)
- Time zone: UTC+04:30 (Afghanistan Time)
- Main languages: Pashto, Brahui, Dari and Balochi

Khash (Dari: خاش) is a village in the Khashrod District of Nimroz Province, in western Afghanistan It is located on the Khash River 75 miles (121 km) southeast of Farah.
