= You and Yours =

BBC radio programme

- Other names: You & Yours
- Genre: Consumer affairs
- Running time: 53 minutes
- Country of origin: United Kingdom
- Language: English
- Home station: BBC Radio 4
- Hosted by: Winifred Robinson, Peter White, Shari Vahl
- Original release: October 1970
- Website: Website

You and Yours is a British radio consumer affairs programme, broadcast on BBC Radio 4 and produced by BBC News.

== History ==
You and Yours began broadcasting in October 1970, when its first presenter was Joan York. In the 1980s it briefly ran seven days a week. In April 1998 it was increased from a 25-minute programme to 55 minutes. However, in 2014 the running time was reduced to approximately 40 minutes to make space for Radio 4's World War I drama Home Front which went out between 12.04 and 12.15. In the months when Home Front was not broadcast a different programme took its place and You and Yours continued to begin at 12.15. In October, the programme's number of presenters changed from two to one. The breadth of topics covered was extended to global problems as well as those closer to home.

The programme continues to cover a wide range of topics, and now broadcasts on themes of medical interest as well as consumer issues. For example, on 8 May 2012, a considerable proportion of the programme was devoted to cancer care. Other medical themes that have been discussed on the programme include dementia and diabetes mellitus. The Tuesday edition of the programme takes the form of a phone-in on a consumer matter and is referred to as Call You and Yours. Winifred Robinson is the usual presenter for most of the week. Shari Vahl and Peter White also often present the programme.

On 9 January 2018, Winifred Robinson did not present the programme. The focus of this edition was fair pay for women in the aftermath of the resignation by Carrie Gracie from her post as the BBC's China Editor and her claim that the BBC was guilty of pay discrimination. Robinson had publicly given support for Ms Gracie and was replaced due to "impartiality issues". Shari Vahl presented this edition of the programme instead.

On 8 October 2026, the BBC announced it would be "cutting a raft of Radio 4 programmes including the long-running consumer and social affairs show You and Yours".

== Transmissions ==
You and Yours is transmitted on Mondays to Wednesdays at 12.04 after the 4-minute news summary at midday, and runs for approximately 53 minutes. The programme is edited by Chas Watkin and has a weekly audience of three and a half million. It is followed by a weather forecast which precedes The World at One.

== Presenters ==
- Winifred Robinson
- Peter White
- Shari Vahl

=== Former presenters ===
- Chris Choi - formerly of Watchdog BBC1
- Louise Minchin
- Julian Worricker (formerly of BBC Radio 5 Live)
- Carolyn Atkinson
- Liz Barclay
- Michael Collie
- John Howard (1982 to 1994, also presented Tuesday Call and The Leading Edge for Radio 5)
- Sheila McClennon
- Clare Catford (1990s)
- Daire Brehan (1990s)
- Diana Madill
- Ken Sykora
- Roisin McAuley (1988)
- John Waite (later presented Face the Facts)
- Tasneem Siddiqi
- Sue MacGregor
- Paul Heiney (1983-5)
- Pattie Coldwell
- Derek Cooper (1970s)
- George Luce (1970s)

== Name ==
The name is the English idiom meaning "you and the people in your family or the people you care about."

== See also ==
- List of BBC Radio 4 programmes
- Watchdog on BBC One
