= Khash River =

River in Afghanistan

Khash River Khash Rud River
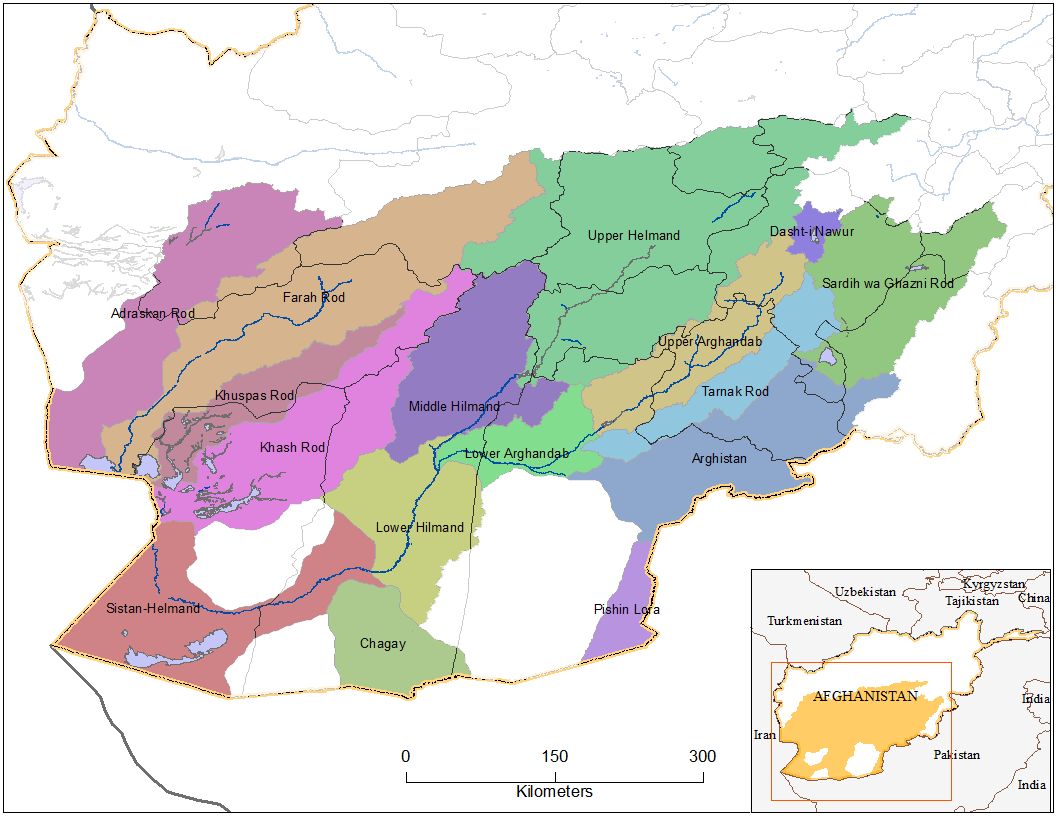
- Native name: خاشرود (Persian)

Location
- Country: Afghanistan

Physical characteristics
- Source
  - location: Sia koh mountains
- Mouth
  - location: Hamun Lake
- Length: 480 km (300 mi)
- Basin size: Sistan Basin

Basin features
- Tributaries
  - left: Helmand River
  - right: Farah River

The Khash River (or Khash Rud River) is a river in Afghanistan.

The Khash rises in the southern part of Ghor Province on the southern slopes of Siah-Koh (Black Mountain), and flows southwest towards the towns of Delaram, Khash, and Zaranj in Nimruz Province. The river water is generally exhausted in irrigation, reaching the Hamun Lake only in flood.

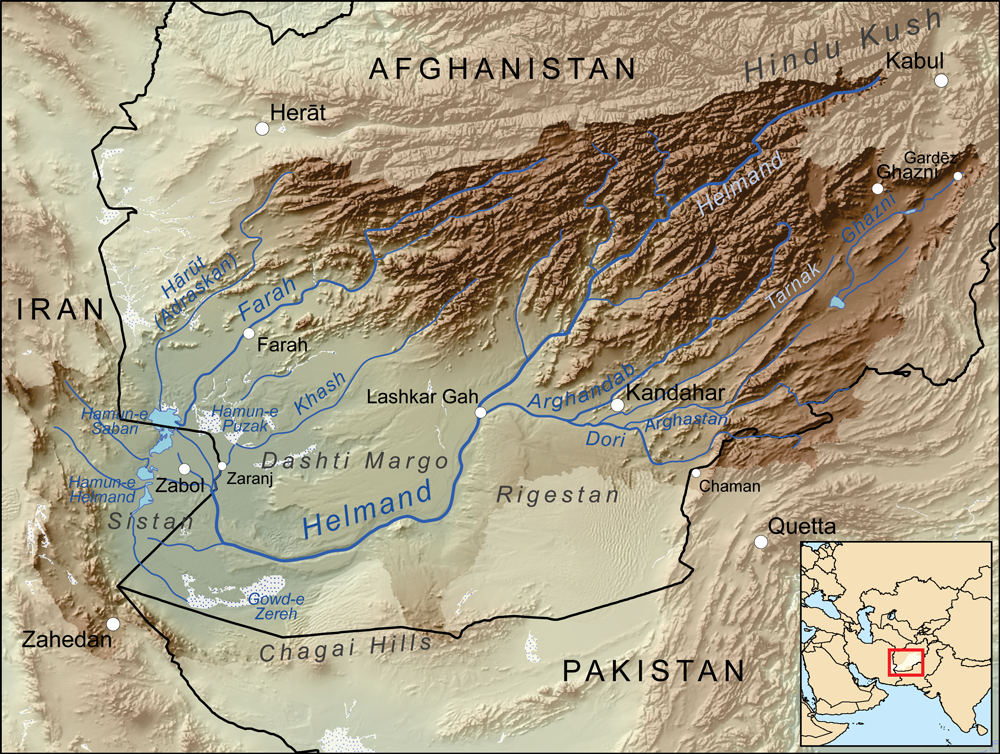
Khash River shown on the map
