= Khashrod District =

Coordinates: 31.7773°N 62.9724°E

Khashrod Dari: ولسوالی خاشرود Pashto: د خاش رود ولسوالی
- District
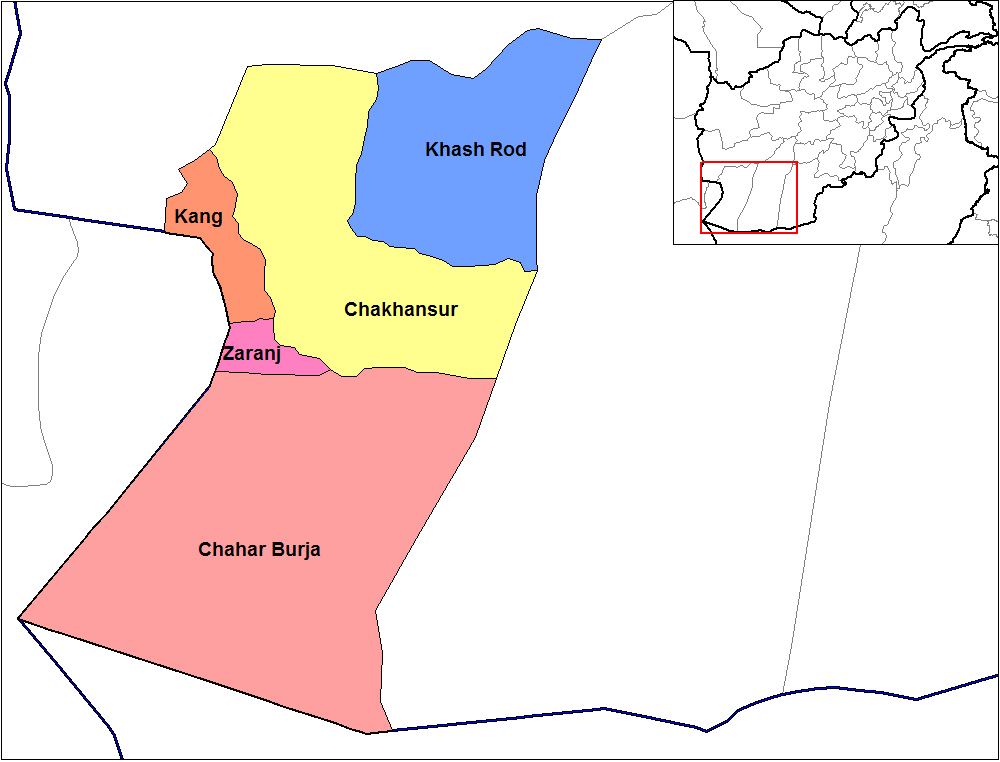
- The district in the map of Nimruz Province
- Country: Afghanistan
- Region: Nimruz Province
- Capital: Ghurghuri

Population (2004)
  - Total: 35,381
- Time zone: UTC+04:30 (Afghanistan Time)

Khashrod District (Dari: ولسوالی خاشرود, Pashto: د خاش رود ولسوالی) is one of the five districts of Nimruz Province in Afghanistan. It had a population of 35,381 in 2004, which was 55% ethnic Pashtun, 20% Baloch, 15% Brahui and 10% Tajik. The district's capital is Ghurghuri. Khashrod gets its name from Khash River, which flows in the district southwest toward Zaranj.

The Islamic Emirate of Afghanistan announced in 2023 that it plans to build a major dam in Khashrod District.

== See also ==
- Districts of Afghanistan
