= The Best of D:Ream =

Compilation album by D:Ream
- Released: 19 May 1997
- Recorded: 1992–1995
- Genre: pop rock, synthpop, dance
- Label: Magnet / Warner Bros.

D:Ream chronology
World (1995)	The Best of D:Ream (1997)	The Platinum Collection (2006)

Singles from The Best of D:Ream
- 1. "Things Can Only Get Better (2nd re-issue)" Released: 21 April 1997

The Best of D:Ream is the first official compilation album from Northern Irish pop/dance band D:Ream, issued by Magnet Records label, and distributed by major Warner Bros. Records, with the management of FXU. It was released in May 1997, just after their UK and U.S. Dance Number 1 hit, Things Can Only Get Better, was re-released for the second time, re-entering the UK Top 20 Singles Chart at Number 19. The song received much publicity from the fact that it was later adopted by the UK Labour Party as their theme for the 1997 UK General Election. The group's record company, in agreement with leader Peter Cunnah, who decided to call it quits with D:Ream, chose to issue this greatest hits collection, instead of their third studio album, which was to be called Heap of Faith, and has since never been released.

The compilation contains 12 tracks taken from their two studio albums, 1993's D:Ream On Volume 1, and 1995's World. Including the re-released "Things Can Only Get Better", the album consists of the seven singles taken from their debut, the three singles from their second album and two more tracks from the latter ("Hold Me Now" and "Heart of Gold") which were never released as singles. This compilation failed to chart in the UK.

== Track listing ==
1. "Things Can Only Get Better" (*)
2. "U R the Best Thing" (*)
3. "Take Me Away" (*)
4. "Shoot Me with Your Love" (**)
5. "Unforgiven" (*)
6. "I Like It" (*)
7. "Party Up the World" (**)
8. "The Power (Of All the Love in the World)" (**)
9. "Blame It on Me" (*)
10. "Heart of Gold" (**)
11. "Star" (*)
12. "Hold Me Now" (**)

(*) Taken from D:Ream On Volume 1 (1993)
(**) Taken from World (1995)

== References and external links ==
- Paul Gambaccini, Tim Rice, Jonathan Rice (1995) British Hits Singles, Guinness Publishing
- EveryHit.com: UK Top 40 Database
- www.d-ream.net: D:Ream's Official Website
