= World (album) =

Studio album by D:Ream
- Released: 18 September 1995
- Recorded: 1994–1995
- Studio: Route (recording); Matrix, Sarm West (mixing)
- Genre: Electronic; pop; synthpop; dance
- Length: 48:53
- Label: Magnet; Warner Bros.
- Producer: D:Ream; Tom Frederikse for FXU Management

D:Ream chronology
D:Ream On Volume 1 (1993)	World (1995)	The Best of D:Ream (1997)

Singles from World
- 1. "Shoot Me with Your Love" Released: 26 June 1995; 2. "Party Up the World" Released: 28 August 1995; 3. "The Power (Of All the Love In the World)" Released: 30 October 1995

World is the second studio album by Northern Irish synthpop / dance band D:Ream, released in 1995. It was to be the band's final studio release before their disbanding in 1997, and their re-forming in the late 2000s.

== Overview ==
World was published by Magnet Records label, distributed by Warner Music major, and managed by FXU Management (some songs being published by EMI Publishing and Pumphouse Songs Inc.), and reached number five in the UK Albums Chart. The album was mostly written, arranged, played and produced by lead singer Peter Cunnah, with the collaboration of some other musicians and vocalists. In particular, the album features TJ Davis on background vocals on all tracks (besides co-lead vocals on "The Power (Of All the Love in the World)"), as well as Simon Ellis and Nick Beggs from Ellis, Beggs & Howard. Ellis plays additional keyboards on "You've Saved My World" and "Heart of Gold", while Beggs plays bass guitar and chapman stick on "Hold Me Now". Three singles were taken from the album; "Shoot Me with Your Love" (UK No. 7), "Party Up the World" (UK No. 20) and "The Power (Of All the Love in the World)" (UK No. 40).

A third studio album (Heap of Faith) was recorded but never released, being replaced by the group's first greatest hits album, The Best of D:Ream in 1997.

== Critical reception ==
Professional ratings
Review scores
Source	Rating
AllMusic	2/5 stars
Music Week	3/5 stars
NME	6/10
Smash Hits	4/5 stars

Helen Lamont from Smash Hits wrote, "D:Ream are one of the few bands who can cross that dance/pop divide convincingly. They can please the pop kids with tunes like 'Shoot Me with Your Love' and 'Party Up the World', and the dance fanatics with most of the other stuff on the album, especially 'Power', which is fantastic. To be critical for a moment, the only thing that's missing from this collection is a very simple, very sweet melody — like 'Star' from the first LP. We need a great, forceful ballad where Peter's voice gets the chance to shine through. D:Ream unplugged? Come on lad — let's have it."

== Track listing ==
All tracks written by Peter Cunnah, except where noted.

No.	Title	Writer(s)	Length
1.	"The Power (Of All the Love in the World)" (featuring TJ Davis)		4:55
2.	"Shoot Me with Your Love"	Cunnah; Tim Hegarty	4:12
3.	"You've Saved My World"	Cunnah; Al Mackenzie	5:09
4.	"The Miracle"		4:20
5.	"Call Me"		5:22
6.	"Enough Is Enough"		4:43
7.	"You Can't Tell Me You Cannot Buy Me Love"		5:59
8.	"Party Up the World"	Cunnah; Peer	4:43
9.	"Hold Me Now"	Cunnah; Jamie Petrie	4:53
10.	"Heart of Gold"		5:37

== Credits ==
- Peter Cunnah – lead vocals, all instruments
- Derek Chai – background vocals (tracks 1, 2, 3, 8, 9); additional bass (tracks 3, 10); additional guitar (track 8)
- Nicole Patterson – background vocals (tracks 1, 2, 3, 8, 9, 10)
- TJ Davis – co-lead vocals (track 1); background vocals (tracks 2 to 10)
- James Mack – additional LP percussion, Zildjian cymbals (tracks 2, 3, 10)
- Jools Holland – piano (track 2)
- Mark Roberts – additional drums (track 3)
- Simon Ellis – additional keyboards (tracks 3, 10)
- Nick Beggs – bass guitar, Chapman Stick (track 9)
- Simon Bates – Yamaha wind synth (track 9)
- D:Ream, Tom Frederikse for FXU – production
- Mike Diver – photography and digital manipulation
- Blue Source – sleeve

== Charts ==
Chart performance for World
Chart (1995)	Peak position
Australian Albums (ARIA)	155
UK Albums (OCC)	5

== Certifications ==
Region	Certification	Certified units/sales
United Kingdom (BPI)	Silver	60,000^{^}
^{^} Shipments figures based on certification alone.
