= Tim Hegarty =

Northern Irish musician (born 1965)

- Born: Timothy John Hegarty; 7 November 1965 (age 60); Derry, Northern Ireland
- Occupations: Songwriter, musician
- Spouse: Julie Parry (m. 1997)
- Children: 3
- Musical career
- Instrument: Drums
- Years active: 1982–present
- Formerly of: Tie the Boy; Baby June; Derry
- Website: timhegarty.com

Timothy John Hegarty, better known as Tim Hegarty (born 7 November 1965 in Derry, Northern Ireland) is a Northern Irish musician and songwriter.

== Personal life ==
Hegarty was born in Derry, Northern Ireland to Hugh and Eilis Hegarty. He attended St Columb's College and read economics at Queen's University Belfast for two years before dropping out. At the age of 21 he moved to London to pursue a career as a musician and became an estate agent. Here he met Julie Parry, an accountant, whom he later married in 1997. They moved to Edinburgh together in 2002 with their three sons. He currently lives in Bath.

== Musical career ==
Hegarty started his musical career in 1982 as a drummer in the Derry band Tie the Boy with fellow musician Peter Cunnah. The band did a session for BBC Radio 1 and went on to do multiple gigs around Northern Ireland. After they split up, he then went on to form a band called Baby June. Hegarty went on to co-write the hit single "Shoot Me with Your Love" from the album World for D:Ream, which made into the UK top 100 for seven weeks, peaking at No.7 in July 1995. Hegarty also co-wrote "No One Can Love You More" for Gloria Gaynor's album I Wish You Love and has written songs for Worlds Apart.

In 2009, Hegarty and his wife, Julie, wrote and produced Crabbit: The Musical with Eddie Izzard's producer Sarah Townsend at the Fringe.

In 2014, Hegarty has formed the band Derry, named after his hometown, and the group has released an introductory RP, Couldn't I Be the One.

== Business ==
Hegarty had a 20% stake in the Northern Irish property tycoon business W G Mitchell and after suffering difficulties during the 2008 financial crisis, the company was forced into administration by The Royal Bank of Scotland. Despite this, Hegarty started a small recruitment company in Edinburgh, George Street Recruitment, owning a number of offices and business centres and was able to continue doing business through this.

== Philanthropy ==
In 1999, Hegarty along with record company boss Ross Graham, composed Across the Bridge of Hope a charity album raising money for the victims of the Omagh Bombings, raising over £330,000. In 2010, Hegarty wrote Lovely Day for Cancer Research UK.
