= D-Ream On Volume 1 =

D:Ream On Vol. 1

Studio album by D:Ream
- Released: 18 October 1993
- Recorded: 1991–1993
- Studios: Aosis (recording); Roundhouse (mixing in 'T' Sound)
- Genres: Electronic; pop rock; synthpop; dance; soul
- Length: 47:31
- Label: Magnet / Warner Bros.
- Producers: D:Ream & Tom Frederikse for Pumphouse Sounds Inc. / FXU Management

D:Ream chronology
4 Things 2 Come (1992)	D:Ream On Vol. 1 (1993)	World (1995)

Singles from D:Ream On Volume 1
- 1. "U R the Best Thing" Released: 22 June 1992; 2. "Things Can Only Get Better" Released: 18 January 1993; 3. "U R the Best Thing (re-issue)" Released: 12 April 1993; 4. "Unforgiven" Released: 19 July 1993; 5. "Star / I Like It" Released: 20 September 1993; 6. "Things Can Only Get Better (re-issue)" Released: 27 December 1993; 7. "U R the Best Thing (re-mix)" Released: 14 March 1994; 8. "Take Me Away" Released: 6 June 1994; 9. "Blame It on Me" Released: 29 August 1994

The correct spelling of this article is D:Ream On Volume 1. It has been retitled here due to technical limitations.

D:Ream On Volume 1 is the debut studio album by Northern Irish pop/dance band D:Ream. It was released in late 1993 by Magnet Records label, distributed by Warner Music major, and managed by FXU Management. The album includes D:Ream's biggest hit single, "Things Can Only Get Better", which reached number one in the UK Singles Chart in 1994. The album also includes the song "U R the Best Thing", which was released three times in total. In 1994, the track was remixed, and managed to get to number 4.

== Singles ==
Many singles were released from the album – seven in total, with some of them being issued more than once. These included "U R the Best Thing" which stalled at number 72 in the UK Singles Chart on first release in July 1992. It was later re-issued in 1993 where it reached number 19 and again in 1994 where it peaked at number four. The biggest hit however was "Things Can Only Get Better" which on initial release in 1993 reached number 24, but on re-release in early 1994, peaked at number one in the UK charts. Other singles taken from the album were: "Unforgiven" (UK No. 29), the double A-sided "Star"/"I Like It" (UK No. 26), "Take Me Away" (UK No. 18) and "Blame It on Me" (UK No. 25).

== Critical reception ==
Professional ratings
Review scores
Source	Rating
AllMusic	2/5 stars
Music Week	3/5 stars
Select	3/5 stars
Smash Hits	4/5 stars

Alan Jones from Music Week wrote, "Producing uplifting, eclectic and superior dance music that pleases the brain as well as the feet, D:Ream are clearly fans of Italo house, whose joyously pumping piano-based elements are frequently employed here. But they also turn their hand to old-fashioned disco, and "Star" is a fine ballad. A stirring debut that deserves to be heard."

== Commercial performance ==
The album reached number 5 in the UK Albums Chart and remained on the UK charts for 37 weeks, spanning a chart run from October 1993 to November 1994.

== Track listing ==
All tracks written by Peter Cunnah, except where noted.

No.	Title	Writer(s)	Length
1.	"Take Me Away"		3:42
2.	"U R the Best Thing"		6:00
3.	"Unforgiven"	Cunnah; Al Mackenzie	4:21
4.	"I Like It"		4:27
5.	"Glorious"	Cunnah; Mackenzie	6:01
6.	"So Long, Movin' On"		5:10
7.	"Picture My World"		5:39
8.	"Blame It on Me"		3:43
9.	"Things Can Only Get Better"	Cunnah; Jamie Petrie	4:14
10.	"Star"		4:14

== Personnel ==
=== Musicians ===
- Peter Cunnah – lead vocals and all instruments
- Al Mackenzie – additional keyboards (track 9)
- Tom Frederikse – additional piano (track 9); Hammond organ (track 8)
- Gary Meek – Hammond organ, piano (track 9)
- Brian Cox – piano (track 10)
- Wendon Davis – congas (tracks 8, 10)
- Rain Shine – original piano (track 8)
- Mark Roberts – additional drums (track 7)
- Neville Young – synth drums (track 9)
- Time – media (track 2)
- Gaetan – additional programming (tracks 6–7)
- Gerry Ruddock – trumpet (track 6)

=== Additional vocalists ===
- Liliana Chacian – voice, spoken in Portuguese (track 5)
- Linda Duggan – background vocals (tracks 1, 3–4, 8)
- Jamie Petrie – background vocals (tracks 8–9)
- Donna Gardier – background vocals (tracks 6–7)
- Peter Crooner – background vocals (track 9)
- Greta Gront – erotic noises (tracks 3, 6, 9)
- Kathleen Pearson-Thomas – background vocals (track 9)
- Dylis Duku – background vocals (track 9)
- Delphi Newman – background vocals (track 9)
- D'Borah Asher – background vocals (track 2)

=== Production ===
- 3M – recording equipment @ Aosis Studios
- 'T'Sound – mixing device at Roundhouse Studios

=== Staff ===
- Simon Fowler – photography
- An Artificially Sweetened Sleeve – sleeve

== Charts ==
Chart performance for D:Ream On Vol. 1
Chart (1993)	Peak position
Australian Albums (ARIA)	12
German Albums (Offizielle Top 100)	69
UK Albums (Official Charts)	5

== Certifications ==
Region	Certification	Certified units/sales
United Kingdom (BPI)	Platinum	300,000^{^}
^{^} Shipments figures based on certification alone.

== Release details ==
Country	Date	Label	Format	Catalog
UK	1993	Magnet Records / Warner Music	CD	4509-93371-2
