= Unforgiven (D:Ream song) =

1993 single by D:Ream

- Original 1993 release

Single by D:Ream

from the album D:Ream On Volume 1
- Released: 19 July 1993
- Genre: Dance-pop; house
- Length: 3:32
- Label: Magnet; FXU
- Songwriters: Peter Cunnah; Al MacKenzie
- Producers: D:Ream; Tom Frederikse

D:Ream singles chronology
"U R the Best Thing" (1992)	"Unforgiven" (1993)	"Things Can Only Get Better" (1993)

Music video
- "Unforgiven" on YouTube

"Unforgiven" is a song by Northern Irish musical group D:Ream, released in July 1993 by labels Magnet and FXU as the third single from their debut album, D:Ream On Volume 1 (1993). Written by band members Peter Cunnah and Al MacKenzie, it was produced by the group with Tom Frederikse. It peaked at number 29 in the UK and number ten in Portugal. After the success of the singles "U R the Best Thing" and "Things Can Only Get Better", "Unforgiven" was re-released in 1994. A music video was also produced to promote the single.

== Critical reception ==
Pan-European magazine Music & Media wrote that "a harmonica whirls prominently through this alternative electro pop/dance song, and wails towards the end like the one featured in the Once Upon The West film". The reviewer also felt that "although it already peaked in the UK, this throbbing, head-bobbing track is infectious and could go far on the Continent." Andy Beevers from Music Week gave it a score of four out of five, calling it "another big, bold song that looks like following both 'U R the Best Thing' and 'Things Can Only Get Better' into the Top 40. Their own mix has a Balearic flavour with its wailing harmonica." In a retrospective review, Pop Rescue remarked that "this is quite a downbeat mellow track", complimenting the vocals by Linda Duggan as "big". They also noted "a little harmonica line." James Hamilton from the Record Mirror Dance Update described it as "sombre humming but bright harmonica washed cantering".

== Track listings ==
- CD single, Europe (1993)
1. "Unforgiven" (7-inch D•Reamix) – 3:32
2. "Unforgiven" (Sine 7-inch edit) – 4:00
3. "Unforgiven" (12-inch D•Reamix) – 7:20
4. "Unforgiven" (Leftfield Hands mix) – 7:02
5. "Unforgiven" (EMF 7-inch mix) – 4:35
6. "Unforgiven" (Leftfield Hard mix) – 8:58
- CD single, Europe (1994)
1. "Unforgiven" (7-inch D•Reamix) – 3:32
2. "Unforgiven" (Sine 7-inch edit) – 4:00
3. "Unforgiven" (12-inch D•Reamix) – 7:20
4. "Unforgiven" (Sine dub) – 9:07
5. "Unforgiven" (Leftfield Hands mix) – 7:20
6. "Unforgiven" (Leftfield Hard mix) – 8:58

== Charts ==
Chart (1993)	Peak position
Europe (Eurochart Hot 100)	65
Portugal (AFP)	10
UK Singles (Official Charts)	29
UK Airplay (ERA)	51
UK Dance (Music Week)	4
UK Club Chart (Music Week)	7

== Release history ==
Region	Date	Format(s)	Label(s)	Ref.
United Kingdom	19 July 1993	7-inch vinyl; 12-inch vinyl; CD; cassette	Magnet; FXU	
Australia	27 September 1993	CD; cassette	Magnet; FXU	
