= Take Me Away (D:Ream song) =

1994 single by D:Ream

Single by D:Ream

from the album D-Ream On Volume 1
- Released: 6 June 1994
- Studio: The Blue Room (London, England)
- Genre: Dance; house
- Length: 3:37
- Label: Magnet; FXU
- Songwriter: Peter Cunnah
- Producer: Tom Frederikse

D:Ream singles chronology
"U R the Best Thing" (Perfecto remix) (1994)	"Take Me Away" (1994)	"Blame It on Me" (1995)

Music video
- "Take Me Away" on YouTube

"Take Me Away" is a song by Northern Irish musical group D:Ream, released in June 1994 by FXU and Magnet Records as the fifth single from the group's debut album, D-Ream On Volume 1 (1993). The song is written by frontman Peter Cunnah and produced by Tom Frederikse, and features female vocals by Linda Duggan. It peaked at number 18 on the UK Singles Chart as well as numbers six and nine on the Music Week Dance Singles chart and the UK Club Chart.

== Critical reception ==
Alan Jones from Music Week gave the song a score of four out of five, writing, "Less of an anthem, and, indeed, less of a song than any of D:Ream's bigger hits, this is nevertheless stirring stuff." James Hamilton from the Record Mirror Dance Update named it a "wailing True Faith-ish girl prodded breezy bounder" in his weekly dance column. Alex Kadis from Smash Hits also gave it four out of five, saying, "Anyone who saw Take That's last tour will have seen Peter Cunnah bringing the roof down with this excellent singalongable dance song. But, there's a bit of a done-that-seen-that vibe to this too. Peter can do even better."

== Track listing ==
- 7-inch vinyl single, UK (1994)

A. "Take Me Away" (Brothers In Rhythm Radio Edit)
B. "Take Me Away" (Love To Infinity Edit)

- 12-inch single, UK (1994)

A1. "Take Me Away" (Brothers In Rhythm Club Mix)
A2. "Take Me Away" (Classic Paradise Mix)
B1. "Take Me Away" (Club 4 Life Mix)
B2. "Take Me Away" (Lifeapella)
B3. "Take Me Away" (Deep Dub)

- CD single, Europe (1994)
1. "Take Me Away" (Brothers In Rhythm Radio Edit) — 3:37
2. "Take Me Away" (Love To Infinity Edit) — 3:32
3. "Take Me Away" (Classic Paradise Mix) — 9:18
4. "Take Me Away" (Club 4 Life Mix) — 7:26
5. "Take Me Away" (Brothers In Rhythm Club Mix) — 6:37
6. "Take Me Away" (Lifeapella) — 2:09
7. "Take Me Away" (Electric Blue Mix) — 7:12
- Cassette single, UK (1994)

A. "Take Me Away" (Brothers In Rhythm Radio Edit)
B. "Take Me Away" (Love To Infinity Edit)

== Charts ==
Chart (1994)	Peak position
Australia (ARIA)	52
Europe (Eurochart Hot 100)	60
Europe (European Dance Radio)	16
Ireland (IRMA)	30
Israel (Israeli Singles Chart)	13
Scotland (OCC)	30
UK Singles (OCC)	18
UK Airplay (Music Week)	19
UK Dance (Music Week)	6
UK Club Chart (Music Week)	9

== Release history ==
Region	Date	Format(s)	Label(s)	Ref.
United Kingdom	6 June 1994	12-inch vinyl; CD; cassette	Magnet; FXU	
Australia	11 July 1994	CD; cassette	Magnet; FXU	
