= Shoot Me with Your Love =

1995 single by D:Ream

Single by D:Ream

from the album World
- Released: 26 June 1995
- Genre: Eurodance; disco; house
- Length: 3:51
- Label: Magnet; FXU
- Songwriters: Peter Cunnah; Tim Hegarty
- Producers: D:Ream; Tom Frederikse

D:Ream singles chronology
"Blame It on Me" (1994)	"Shoot Me with Your Love" (1995)	"Party Up the World" (1995)

Music video
- "Shoot Me with Your Love" on YouTube

"Shoot Me with Your Love" is a song by Northern Irish music group D:Ream, released in June 1995 by Magnet and FXU as the first single from their second album, World (1995). Co-written by frontman Peter Cunnah with Tim Hegarty, and produced by the group with Tom Frederikse. Upon its release, it received favorable reviews from music critics, and peaked at number seven on the UK Singles Chart as well as number three on the UK Dance Singles Chart. The follow-ups, "Party Up the World" and "The Power (Of All the Love in the World)", reached number 20 and 40, respectively.

== Critical reception ==
John Bush from AllMusic felt the song "mixes a disco style with more familiar house and pop elements, with Peter Cunnah's stronger-than-usual vocals." Larry Flick from Billboard magazine wrote, "Ebullient disco/house spinner that sparks with optimistic lyrics and a joy-ful vocal by front man Peter Cunnah. The chorus builds to anthemic proportions in the context of the track's rattling percussion and rolling piano lines." He also remarked "the tireless and oh-so-contagious tone" of the album version. Music & Media stated that the singer "writes songs which will still be played in five years time. It's like George Michael's 'Freedom II'. Additional piano is played by Jools Holland." Chris Moore, head of music on Red Dragon/Cardiff gave it 36-40 plays a week. He said, "After all those rereleases and remixes of singles off their first album, it's good to finally get something new from D:Ream. It's a great pop record, bound to be top 5 in the UK."

Music Week gave the song three out of five, calling it "a rather unimaginative effort from Peter Cunnah, but it's got just enough of the feel-good factor to get arms waving and fans buying." Roger Morton from NME wrote, "There is no clutter here, just a vapour trail of elation like a U2 plastic gospel chorus stretching beyond the horizon to the place where ABC and Boney M would have moved to if they'd known about Italian house." He concluded, "B:Rilliant." In a retrospective review, Pop Rescue stated, "This is an extremely up-beat track and one that's very catchy. Its mid-section choral breaks harks back to 'Things Can Only Get Better'." James Hamilton of the Record Mirror Dance Update described it as a "'Na Na Hey Kiss Him Goodbye'-ishly chanted soaring, wukka-wukking, jangling and thumping joyous strider". Smash Hits named it a "fantastically energetic pop-dance single that will see D:Ream back where they belong - at the top of the charts." Smash Hits editor Gina Morris gave it four out of five, writing, "There's always been a.. erm, futuristic cheesy flavour to D:Ream. This, you may be pleased to hear, won't disappoint, it's another dose of kitschy, energetic BIG POP!"

== Chart performance ==
"Shoot Me with Your Love" peaked at number seven during its first week on the UK Singles Chart, on 2 July 1995, and stayed within the chart for a total of eight weeks. In Scotland, it charted higher, peaking at number six. On the UK Dance Singles Chart, it reached number three the same week. Additionally, the single was a top-20 hit in Finland and Ireland, a top-50 hit in Switzerland, and a top-80 hit in Germany. On the Eurochart Hot 100, it peaked at number 26 during its second week on the chart on 22 July, after debuting as number 44 the week before. On the European Dance Radio Chart, "Shoot Me with Your Love" reached number three during the same period. Outside Europe, it charted in Israel, peaking at number 19 and in Australia, peaking at number 73 on the ARIA Singles Chart.

== Track listings ==
- 12-inch, UK (1995)
1. "Shoot Me with Your Love" (Loveland's 12-inch Pop'd Up mix) – 6:49
2. "Shoot Me with Your Love" (Loveland's Full Metal Jacket dub mix) – 7:00
3. "Shoot Me with Your Love" (Re:Deamix) – 6:49
4. "Shoot Me with Your Love" (Daydreemer mix) – 8:25
- 12-inch single, US (1995)
1. "Shoot Me with Your Love" (Loveland's 12-inch Pop'd Up mix) – 6:55
2. "Shoot Me with Your Love" (Loveland's Full Metal Jacket dub mix) – 7:02
3. "Shoot Me with Your Love" (Re:deam mix) – 6:50
4. "Shoot Me with Your Love" (Junior's 12-inch club mix) – 8:50
- CD single, UK and Europe (1995)
1. "Shoot Me with Your Love" (Loveland's 7-inch Pop'd Up mix) – 3:51
2. "Shoot Me with Your Love" (D:Reamix) – 3:46
3. "Shoot Me with Your Love" (Re:Deamix) – 6:49
4. "Shoot Me with Your Love" (Loveland's Full Metal Jacket mix) – 7:00
5. "Shoot Me with Your Love" (Junior's 12-inch club mix) – 8:50

== Charts ==
Chart (1995)	Peak position
Australia (ARIA)	73
Europe (Eurochart Hot 100)	26
Europe (European Dance Radio)	3
Europe (European Hit Radio)	16
Finland (IFPI)	13
Germany (GfK)	73
Ireland (IRMA)	16
Israel (Israeli Singles Chart)	19
Scottish Singles Sales (Official Charts)	6
Switzerland (Schweizer Hitparade)	45
UK Singles (Official Charts)	7
UK Dance (Official Charts)	3
UK Airplay (Music Week)	5
UK Pop Tip Club Chart (Music Week)	15
US Dance Club Play (Billboard)	4
US Maxi-Singles Sales (Billboard)	34

== Release history ==
Region	Date	Format(s)	Label(s)	Ref.
United Kingdom	26 June 1995	12-inch vinyl; CD; cassette	Magnet; FXU	
Australia	14 August 1995	CD; cassette	Magnet; FXU	
United States	10 October 1995	Contemporary hit radio	Sire; Magnet	
