= U R the Best Thing =

1992 single by D:Ream

- Standard artwork for the 1994 reissue

Single by D:Ream

from the album D:Ream On Volume 1
- Released: 22 June 1992
- Genre: Dance-pop; house
- Length: 4:09 (1992 version); 4:08 (1993 version); 4:05 (1994 Perfecto radio mix)
- Label: FXU (all releases); Rhythm King (1992); Magnet (1993, 1994)
- Songwriter: Peter Cunnah
- Producers: D:Ream; Tom Frederikse; David Morales; Sasha; Paul Oakenfold; Steve Osborne

D:Ream singles chronology
"U R the Best Thing" (1992)	"Unforgiven" (1993)
"Things Can Only Get Better" (1993)	"U R the Best Thing" (Perfecto mix) (1994)	"Take Me Away" (1994)

Music videos
- "U R the Best Thing" (1993 version) on YouTube
- "U R the Best Thing" (1994 version) on YouTube

"U R the Best Thing" is a song by Northern Irish musical group D:Ream, included on their first album, D:Ream On Volume 1 (1993), and released as their debut single. Originally a club hit released in 1992, the song has been remixed and re-released twice: in 1993 and in 1994. The 1994 version, also known as the Perfecto mix (by Paul Oakenfold and Steve Osborne), was most successful peaking at number three in Scotland, number four on the UK Singles Chart and number six in Ireland. It also peaked at number 13 on the Eurochart Hot 100. The 1993 version reached number one on the Billboard Dance Club Play chart in the US. There were made three different music videos to promote the single; the 1994 version was directed by Marcus Nispel and filmed in New York City. It received a nomination at the 1994 Billboard Music Video Awards.

The track was voted Pete Tong's 'Essential Tune' of 1992, voted the "#1 Single of the Year" by BBC Radio in 1993 and in 1996, British magazine Mixmag ranked it number 96 in their "100 Greatest Dance Singles of All Time" list.

== Critical reception ==
=== 1992 version ===
In 1992, British Lennox Herald named 'U R the Best Thing' a "house track with hypnotic song and certain club smash." Paul Mathur from Melody Maker wrote, "This sounds like nobody's business, has voices to turn nightingales green and according to the press release is, "as hard and stunning as a barren stepmother's slap". As metaphors go, that one is pretty Himalayan." Mixmag named it a "heart-stopping, piano pounding epic."

A reviewer from Music Week praised it as "excellent", noting that it "mates well-crafted lyrics with some of this year's most essential samples and breaks". James Hamilton from the Record Mirror Dance Update stated that the track is "featuring some soaring support by D'borah Asher but made most exciting by its rippling vibes breaks, husky pop singer Peter Cunnah and DJ Al McKenzie's thumping and surging jangly house bounder".

=== 1993 version ===
In 1993, Larry Flick from Billboard magazine wrote, "The element that sets this record apart from the pack of wolves vying for recognition is that there is a real song tucked beneath the barrage of studio tricks and house beats. Here is one that doesn't lose any of its appeal once you stop twirling; the melody and lyrics stay with long after daylight. Props to the group's masterminds, Peter Cunnah and M Mackenzie, for going the extra mile and giving us something to feel and whistle to." Dave Sholin from the Gavin Report felt "the pair blends a house sound with a just a taste of alternative." In his weekly UK chart commentary, James Masterton said, "More dance crossover only it is hard to describe it as such this time, with such a strong pop chorus and vocal. This one may well emulate the current success of Robin S. and climb slowly and gradually into the 10." Paul Mathur from Melody Maker wrote that "the original of this was always guaranteed to send any end-of-night dancefloor into such a frenzy". He added, "One to fall in love to."

Andy Beevers from Music Week gave the song a top score of five out of five and named it Pick of the Week in the category of Dance, complimenting the "superb new Morales mixes which have been getting a great dancefloor reaction". Roger Morton from NME stated, "No doubt this one, which falls somewhere between Inner City and The Tyrrel Corporation, with its marshmallow groove and flyaway female vocal, will also have both suits and longhairs piling onto the polished bit of the ballroom. There's a million remixes, of which Sasha's is the jumpiest. This is as undeniable as a waxed Porsche." James Hamilton from the Record Mirror Dance Update described it as a "wriggling jangly canterer". Tim Southwell from Smash Hits gave the '93 version three out of five, noting that it "brings together flutes, piano and a drumbeat that shuffles along, creating a wobbly wah-wah effect." He also highlighted its "impressive and powerful" backing singer.

=== 1994 version ===
In 1994, Scottish Dundee Courier named 'U R the Best Thing' a "standout" track from the album. Ian Gittens from Melody Maker stated, "D:Ream are the best E-shaped pop band to emerge from the dance explosion to date." A reviewer from Music & Media wrote, "Yep, it's them again with their umpteenth rerelease. Remixed by Paul Oakenfold and Steve Osborne, it's another step up the stairs to stardom for the pop dance duo." The magazine's Maria Jimenez constated that the track's "longevity is assisted by this wide spectrum of new remixes". Alan Jones from Music Week rated the remix four out of five, naming it Pick of the Week and "a bankable follow up" to their number one hit, 'Things Can Only Get Better'. John Kilgo from The Network Forty commented, "Looking for a flavorful uptempo dance track? Look no further than this techno jammer that has scored the #1 position on the dance charts." Paul Moody from NME commented, "Peter Cunnah has come up with something here that will assail you in supermarkets, unnerve you when it bursts from car stereos and scare the charts rigid. Love it from the off and your life will be a whole lot easier."

Tim Jeffery from the Record Mirror Dance Update said, "These new Perfecto mixes keep the attractive flute part while adding strings and a distictive [sic] piano sound to make the song an anthem once again. Stylish, commercial and probably a hit second time around." Another Record Mirror editor, James Hamilton, named it an "attractive huskily crooned throbbing 122.9bpm" Perfecto remix. Adam Higginbotham from Select described it as a "perfect feelgood pop-dance record" and felt it "left no one in any doubt about where they were coming from." Pete Stanton from Smash Hits gave it four out of five, writing, "It's as good now as it was then with its anthem-like chorus and plinkety pianos. This is even better than 'Things Can Only Get Better'." Darren Ressler from Vibe named it a "buoyant" smash.

== Music video ==
There were made three different music videos for the song, one for each year; in 1992, 1993 and 1994. The latter version was directed by German director and producer Marcus Nispel and filmed in New York City, on Royalton New York Hotel. It features Peter Cunnah and the band performing the song at a rooftop, in an urban setting, surrounded by skyscrapers. Sometimes Cunnah performs while hanging from a crane, other times he sends paper planes. Soap bubbles are bubbling in the air and occasionally old newspapers are seen blowing by in the wind over the rooftop. The video was nominated for Best New Artist Clip of the Year in the category for Dance at the 1994 Billboard Music Video Awards. "U R the Best Thing" received "prime break out" rotation on MTV Europe in June 1994. Later, it was C-listed on German music television channel VIVA in July 1994.

=== Personnel ===
- Director: Marcus Nispel
- Director of photography: Jamie Rosenberg:
- Producer and executive-producer: Anouk Frankel
- Producer and executive-producer: Brendan Heath
- Supervising producer: Shelly Bloch

== Track listings ==
- CD maxi, Europe (1992)
1. "U R the Best Thing" – 4:09
2. "U R the Best Thing" (D:Ream dub) – 6:33
3. "U R the Best Thing" (Sasha full mix) – 7:55
4. "U R the Best Thing" (12-inch mix) – 6:18
5. "U R the Best Thing" (a cappella) – 4:57
6. "U R the Best Thing" (Slow Hand Super Summer Disco mix) – 6:20
- CD maxi, Europe (1993)
1. "U R the Best Thing" – 4:08
2. "U R the Best Thing" (D:Ream extended 12-inch mix) – 6:13
3. "U R the Best Thing" (Sasha full edit) – 6:52
4. "U R the Best Thing" (Def Klub mix) – 7:56
5. "U R the Best Thing" (Mo Bass Part II) – 11:12
6. "U R the Best Thing" (Def radio mix) – 3:37
- CD maxi, Europe (1994)
1. "U R the Best Thing" (Perfecto radio mix) – 4:05
2. "U R the Best Thing" (Original 7-inch mix) – 4:05
3. "U R the Best Thing" (Perfecto mix) – 6:43
4. "U R the Best Thing" (Sasha full mix) – 7:58
5. "U R the Best Thing" (Mo Bass Pt II) – 11:13
6. "U R the Best Thing" (D·Ream extended mix) – 5:50

== Charts ==
=== Weekly charts ===
Chart (1992)	Peak position
UK Singles (OCC)	72
UK Dance (Music Week)	4
UK Club Chart (Music Week)	21

Chart (1993)	Peak position
Australia (ARIA)	117
Belgium (Ultratop Flanders)	50
Europe (Eurochart Hot 100)	62
Europe (European Dance Radio)	11
Ireland (IRMA)	6
Israel (Israeli Singles Chart)	13
UK Singles (OCC)	19
UK Airplay (Music Week)	15
UK Dance (Music Week)	1
UK Club Chart (Music Week)	1
US Dance Club Play (Billboard)	1
US Maxi-Singles Sales (Billboard)	5

Chart (1994)	Peak position
Australia (ARIA)	9
Belgium (Ultratop 50 Flanders)	46
Europe (Eurochart Hot 100)	13
Europe (European Hit Radio)	19
Finland (IFPI)	18
Germany (GfK)	65
Ireland (IRMA)	6
Netherlands (Dutch Top 40)	26
Netherlands (Single Top 100)	25
Scotland (OCC)	3
Switzerland (Schweizer Hitparade)	35
UK Singles (OCC)	4
UK Airplay (Music Week)	1
UK Dance (Music Week)	7
UK Club Chart (Music Week)	7

=== Year-end charts ===
Chart (1993)	Position
UK Club Chart (Music Week)	69
US Dance Club Play (Billboard)	34

Chart (1994)	Position
Australia (ARIA)	86
UK Singles (OCC)	62
UK Airplay (Music Week)	26

== Certifications ==
Region	Certification	Certified units/sales
United Kingdom (BPI)	Silver	200,000^{‡}
^{‡} Sales+streaming figures based on certification alone.

== Release history ==
Region	Version	Date	Format(s)	Label(s)	Ref.
United Kingdom	Original	22 June 1992	7-inch vinyl; 12-inch vinyl; CD; cassette	FXU; Rhythm King	
United Kingdom (re-release)	Original	12 April 1993	7-inch vinyl; 12-inch vinyl; CD; cassette	Magnet; FXU	
Australia	Original	21 June 1993	CD; cassette	Magnet; FXU	
United Kingdom	Perfecto mix	14 March 1994	7-inch vinyl; 12-inch vinyl; CD; cassette	Magnet; FXU	
Australia	Perfecto mix	25 April 1994	CD; cassette	Magnet; FXU	
