= Blame It on Me (D:Ream song) =

1994 single by D:Ream

Single by D:Ream

from the album D-Ream On Volume 1
- Released: 30 August 1994
- Genre: Pop; gospel; soul
- Length: 3:47
- Label: Magnet; FXU; Warner UK
- Songwriter: Peter Cunnah
- Producer: Tom Frederikse

D:Ream singles chronology
"Take Me Away" (1994)	"Blame It on Me" (1994)	"Shoot Me with Your Love" (1995)

Music video
- "Blame It on Me" on YouTube

"Blame It on Me" is a song by Northern Irish musical group D:Ream, released in August 1994 by Magnet, FXU and Warner Music UK as the sixth and last single from the group's debut album, D-Ream On Volume 1 (1993). The song is written by frontman Peter Cunnah and features backing vocals by Jamie Petrie and Linda Duggan. Produced by Tom Frederikse, "Blame It on Me" received favorable reviews from music critics, peaking at number 25 on the UK Singles Chart and number 15 on the UK Dance Singles Chart.

== Critical reception ==
In his weekly UK chart commentary, James Masterton wrote, "The new single clams things down a little from the rampant dance pop of their previous hits with an almost gospelly [that's not even a word] ballad which may well under-perform in the charts, despite being another example of a song well sung." Jennifer Nine from Melody Maker said, "Thing is, Peter Cunnah is starting to look cuter. And this song, darn it, despite being not nearly as overblown as it should be in the gospel-chorus department, is the silky, upful piano-and-twiddly-synth soul business. I played it over and over." Pan-European magazine Music & Media commented, "While George Michael spends all his time in court, Peter Cunnah takes his chance to fill the gap in the market. Here he's like a young Joel singing the 'River of D:Reams'."

Alan Jones from Music Week gave "Blame It on Me" a score of four out of five and named it Pick of the Week, saying, "Quite different from previous D:Ream singles, this mid-tempoed pop nugget is dominated by piano and soft percussion, which allow Peter Cunnah to weave in and out with rather more room for expression than some of the group's other material." James Hamilton from the Record Mirror Dance Update described it as a "pop crooner Peter Cunnah's huge singalong chroused and piano plonked shuffling jiggly 0-97.8-0bpm [track]". Sylvia Patterson from Smash Hits also gave the song four out of five, writing, "This one's almost a ballad — but it's got big soul, vicar, it's got a choir of gospel angels, a celebration piano, a frolicin' bass and the whole thing whisks you away to a pulpit in Louisiana". Darren Ressler from Vibe complimented it as a "tender, gospel-tinged pop ballad".

== Track listing ==
- 7-inch single, UK (1994)
1. "Blame It on Me"
2. "Heart of Gold"
- 12-inch, UK (1994)
1. "Blame It on Me" (A Club Dub by Tin Tin Out)
2. "Blame It on Me" (original version)
3. "Blame It on Me" (The Herbal mix)
- CD single, UK (1994)
1. "Blame It on Me" — 3:47
2. "Heart of Gold" — 3:43
3. "U R the Best Thing" (acoustic) — 4:16
4. "Blame It on Me" (A Club Dub by Tin Tin Out) — 8:06

== Charts ==
Chart (1994)	Peak position
Europe (Eurochart Hot 100)	74
Scotland (OCC)	19
UK Singles (OCC)	25
UK Airplay (Music Week)	19
UK Dance (OCC)	15
UK Dance (Music Week)	15
UK Club Chart (Music Week)	27
