= Things Can Only Get Better (D:Ream song) =

1993 single by D:Ream

Single by D:Ream

from the album D:Ream On Volume 1
- Released: 18 January 1993
- Studio: Roundhouse
- Genre: Dance-pop; house; gospel
- Length: 4:03
- Label: Magnet; FXU
- Songwriters: Peter Cunnah; Jamie Petrie
- Producers: D:Ream; Tom Frederikse

D:Ream singles chronology
"Unforgiven" (1993)	"Things Can Only Get Better" (1993)	"U R the Best Thing" (1993)
"Star" / "I Like It" (1993)	"Things Can Only Get Better" (1993)	"U R the Best Thing (Perfecto Mix)" (1994)

Music video
- "Things Can Only Get Better" on YouTube

"Things Can Only Get Better" is a song by Northern Irish musical group D:Ream, released in January 1993 by Magnet Records and FXU as the second single from the group's debut album, D:Ream On Volume 1 (1993). It was written by Peter Cunnah and Jamie Petrie, and was a sleeper hit. The single was remixed and re-released in December 1993 to coincide with the band's supporting Take That on their UK tour, spending four weeks at number one on the UK singles chart in early 1994. In the US, it peaked at number seven on the Billboard Dance Club Play chart later the same year.

The song's accompanying music video was directed by James Lebon and was nominated for the International Viewer's Choice Award at the 1994 MTV Europe Music Awards. At the same event, D:Ream earned a nomination for Best Dance Act. "Things Can Only Get Better" was also nominated in the category for Tune of the Year at the International Dance Awards 1995.

== Background and release ==
"There used to be this idea that rock music was intellectual and dance music was just a totally physical thing. I think we're one of the bands that has succeeded in breaking that down. If people just want to dance to our music, that's fine. If they want to sit down and take in some of the serious points addressed by the lyrics, that's also fine. If they want to listen to it on both levels, that's even better."

— Peter Cunnah of D:Ream.

Peter Cunnah's inspiration for the song came while living in London following his previous group's breakup, working an office job and being told by a co-worker, "Don't worry. Things can only get better." Cunnah soon after started work on the track but did not complete it.

Two years later, after Cunnah started D:Ream, he resumed work on the track, alongside producer Tom Frederikse. While the initial version of the track was an instrumental with a reggae break, the final version of the track was described as sounding like a "stadium full of people singing". The single was released in January 1993.

== Critical reception ==
Scottish Aberdeen Evening Express complimented the song as "incredibly catchy". Larry Flick from Billboard magazine described it as a "radio-friendly ditty that blends an insinuating groove with rollicking gospel chants and a wildly infectious pop melody. Track builds to a fitting, anthemic musical climax that is complemented by choir vocals and heartfelt lead belting." Simon Warner from The Guardian declared it as "the sort of insistent pop anthem that comes along only once in a while." Irish Evening Herald named it a "prophetic anthem". Tom Ewing of Freaky Trigger described it as "tune-heavy, hands-high dance-pop". Ian Gittins from Melody Maker declared it as an "infectious, euphoric anthem". Pan-European magazine Music & Media called it a "poppy rave anthem" and concluded that "this optimistic perspective on life deserves your support." Andy Beevers from Music Week named it a "stand-out tune" and a "tuneful, epic house track". John Kilgo from The Network Forty felt the house approach gives this tune "a cutting edge feel." He explained, "D:Ream sends a positive message to disenchanted youth. Featuring powerful vibes flavored by techno bass thumps as well as Peter Cunnah's searing harmonies, this record will stir up the request lines for months. Encompassing the best of dance, rock, and alternative, D:Ream hits a home run."

Iestyn George from NME found that D:Ream's "Hammond-driven lead track 'Things Can Only Get Better' is supremely uplifting stuff, crossing melody lines from Elton John's 'Song for Guy', Yello's 'The Race' and (gulp) The Farm's 'All Together Now'. More, please." Another NME editor, Mandi James, praised its "hallelujah chorus of good vibrations, positive power and disco magic gift wrapped in gospel glory." In a retrospective review, Pop Rescue complimented its "funky saxophone, a relentlessly thumping bass drum, house piano and Peter's strong vocals." The reviewer stated that "it's still a bloody good song". James Hamilton from the Record Mirror Dance Update described it as a "infectious" and "jiggly chugger" in his weekly dance column. Adam Higginbotham from Select deemed it a "perfect feelgood pop-dance record". Leesa Daniels from Smash Hits gave it a full score of five out of five, stating that D:Ream "are the best dance act this side of the moon and it's a crime that they're not as big as M People already with all their fab dancey tunes. Stick it on, stick it out and let 'em down. Just watch the elastic on your knickers burst with the sheer excitement of it all. Bloomin' marvellous."

== Chart performance ==
"Things Can Only Get Better" was originally a club hit, reaching number 24 in the UK in January 1993. A remixed version was released in December 1993 while the group were supporting Take That on their UK tour; this version reached number one on the UK singles chart on 16 January 1994, spending four weeks atop the chart, and also peaked at number one on the UK Dance Singles Chart. In Europe, the song entered the top 10 in Belgium, Finland, Iceland, Ireland and Sweden. Additionally, it was a top-20 hit in Denmark, Germany and the Netherlands. On the Eurochart Hot 100, "Things Can Only Get Better" reached number five in February 1994. Outside Europe, the song peaked at number three in Israel, number nine in Australia and number 46 in New Zealand. In the US, the 1994 version peaked at number seven on the Billboard Dance Club Play chart. It was awarded a platinum record in the UK and also received a gold record in Australia after 35,000 units were shipped.

== Music video ==
The music video for "Things Can Only Get Better" was directed by British film and music video director James Lebon. It depicts the band performing the song in front of a backdrop of various scenes and images, such as art, burning flames and skies, prominently including Hieronymus Bosch's "The Garden of Earthly Delights". In between, they are performing on stage in front of a dancing audience. A young female sometimes appears. The chorus scenes shows Cunnah in front of a large white-clad choir in a heaven-like setting, singing and clapping in unison. Both the opening and the closing depicts a stage curtain that opens and closes in front of Cunnah. The video was a Box Top on British music television channel The Box in the beginning of February 1994. One month later, it received active rotation on MTV Europe and was A-listed on Germany's VIVA. The video was nominated for the International Viewer's Choice Award for MTV Europe at the 1994 MTV Europe Music Awards, where D:Ream also was nominated for Best Dance Act.

== In popular culture ==
=== As a campaign song ===
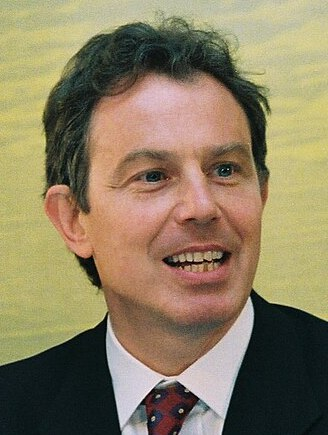
"Things Can Only Get Better" was frequently used by the Labour Party, then led by Tony Blair (pictured), in their successful 1997 campaign.

During the 1997 general election, the Labour Party adopted the song as their campaign theme (the title claiming that things "cannot get worse"). Having spent eighteen years as the Opposition, the song was seen as reflective of the new direction of the party under Tony Blair. In an attempt to appear more relevant to voters the Labour Party stopped using the campaign song used by previous leaders, "The Red Flag". The song's usage returned it to the chart, reaching number 19 in May 1997, when Labour returned to power with Blair as Prime Minister.

In 2024, the song was unexpectedly played by the political activist Steve Bray as Prime Minister Rishi Sunak announced the date of the 2024 general election outside 10 Downing Street. This led to the song entering the top 10 on the iTunes Charts within 24 hours. The band later stated they regretted permitting the song to be used in political campaigns following the UK's involvement in the Iraq War and would not grant permission for it to be used in future campaigns.

=== Other uses ===
In February 1998, the song was featured in an episode of Top Gear, during the review of the Toyota Avensis, with a voice-over by presenter Jeremy Clarkson.

In 2013, the song was adopted as a chant by fans of Sunderland, after the team's revival under manager Gus Poyet. On 3 March 2014, following a campaign by Sunderland Fans, the song re entered in the UK Dance Chart at number 19. D:Ream member, Al Mackenzie described the resurgence to a Sunderland website as "a bit bizarre" but he was "revelling in it".

A running gag on The Infinite Monkey Cage, which D:Ream's former keyboardist Brian Cox co-presents, highlights that the lyric "Things Can Only Get Better" violates the second law of thermodynamics.

The song was covered in a choral style in episode six ("Ruritania") of the sixth season of The Crown, in which Tony Blair (Bertie Carvel) was crowned King, during the Queen's (Imelda Staunton) nightmare.

The song was played by Brian Cox in an end-credits scene cameo in the 2019 film A Shaun the Sheep Movie: Farmageddon.

During the COVID-19 pandemic, the song was used in Nottingham as part of the Clap for Carers campaign.

== Track listings ==
- CD maxi, Europe (first 1993 release)
  1. "Things Can Only Get Better" (7-inch D:reamix) – 3:23
  2. "Things Can Only Get Better" (12-inch D:reamix) – 7:10
  3. "Things Can Only Get Better" (12-inch vocal dub) – 8:00
  4. "Things Can Only Get Better" (12-inch instrumental) – 6:10
  5. "Things Can Only Get Better" (12-inch Danny Rampling mix) – 5:55
- CD maxi, Europe (second 1993 release)
  1. "Things Can Only Get Better" (D·Reamix edit) – 4:01
  2. "Things Can Only Get Better" (12-inch D·Reamix) – 7:04
  3. "Things Can Only Get Better" (Cleveland City Style) – 6:15
  4. "Things Can Only Get Better" (Superfly Development vocal) – 5:58
  5. "Things Can Only Get Better" (Cleveland Main Vocal) – 6:32
  6. "Things Can Only Get Better" 8Cleveland Euro Style) – 5:58
- CD maxi, Europe (1997)
  1. "Things Can Only Get Better" (D:reamix edit) – 3:59
  2. "Things Can Only Get Better" (D:reamix '97 edit) – 4:06
  3. "Things Can Only Get Better" (12-inch D:reamix) – 7:03
  4. "Things Can Only Get Better" (12-inch D:reamix '97) – 8:14
  5. "Things Can Only Get Better" (Cleveland City Style) – 6:14
  6. "Things Can Only Get Better" (Superfly Development vocal) – 5:59
- Digital download (2014)
  1. "Things Can Only Get Better" (D·Reamix edit) – 4:01

== Charts ==
=== Weekly charts ===
1993 weekly chart performance for "Things Can Only Get Better"
Chart (1993)	Peak position
Australia (ARIA)	128
Europe (Eurochart Hot 100)	96
UK Singles (OCC)	24
UK Airplay (Music Week)	39
UK Dance (Music Week)	1
UK Club Chart (Music Week)	15

1994 weekly chart performance for "Things Can Only Get Better"
Chart (1994)	Peak position
Australia (ARIA)	9
Austria (Ö3 Austria Top 40)	23
Belgium (Ultratop 50 Flanders)	10
Denmark (IFPI)	19
Europe (Eurochart Hot 100)	5
Europe (European AC Radio)	15
Europe (European Dance Radio)	22
Europe (European Hit Radio)	5
Finland (Suomen virallinen lista)	2
Germany (GfK)	20
Iceland (Íslenski Listinn Topp 40)	4
Ireland (IRMA)	2
Israel (Israeli Singles Chart)	3
Netherlands (Dutch Top 40)	21
Netherlands (Single Top 100)	20
New Zealand (Recorded Music NZ)	46
Sweden (Sverigetopplistan)	7
Switzerland (Schweizer Hitparade)	11
UK Singles (Official Charts)	1
UK Airplay (Music Week)	1
UK Dance (Music Week)	1
UK Club Chart (Music Week)	14
US Dance Club Play (Billboard)	7

1997 weekly chart performance for "Things Can Only Get Better"
Chart (1997)	Peak position
Scottish Singles Sales (Official Charts)	17
UK Singles (Official Charts)	19
UK Dance (Official Charts)	30

=== Year-end charts ===
Year-end chart performance for "Things Can Only Get Better"
Chart (1994)	Position
Australia (ARIA)	32
Belgium (Ultratop 50 Flanders)	64
Europe (Eurochart Hot 100)	32
Europe (European Hit Radio)	30
Germany (Media Control)	77
Iceland (Íslenski Listinn Topp 40)	71
Netherlands (Dutch Top 40)	155
Sweden (Topplistan)	100
Switzerland (Schweizer Hitparade)	50
UK Singles (OCC)	9
UK Airplay (Music Week)	13

== Certifications ==
Certifications and sales for "Things Can Only Get Better"
Region	Certification	Certified units/sales
Australia (ARIA)	Gold	35,000^{^}
United Kingdom (BPI)	Platinum	600,000^{‡}
^{^} Shipments figures based on certification alone.^{‡} Sales+streaming figures based on certification alone.

== Release history ==
Release dates and formats for "Things Can Only Get Better"
Region	Version	Date	Format(s)	Label(s)	Ref.
United Kingdom	Original release	18 January 1993	7-inch vinyl; 12-inch vinyl; CD; cassette	Magnet; FXU	
Australia	Original release	19 April 1993	CD; cassette	Magnet; FXU	
United Kingdom	First re-release	29 December 1993	12-inch vinyl; CD; cassette	Magnet; FXU	
Australia	First re-release	21 February 1993	Cassette	Magnet; FXU	
United Kingdom	Second re-release	21 April 1997	12-inch vinyl; CD; cassette	Magnet; FXU	
