= Tyrell Corporation =

Tyrell Corporation may refer to:

- Fictional company in the film Blade Runner that develops replicants
- Tyrrell Racing Organisation, a Formula 1 team that raced from 1968 to 1998
- Tyrrells (crisps), a British manufacturer of potato crisps
- The Tyrrel Corporation, a 1990s English recording group
