= Blame It on Me =

Blame It on Me may refer to:

- Blame It on Me (album), a 1997 album by Alana Davis
- "Blame It on Me" (Chrisette Michele song), 2009
- "Blame It on Me" (D:Ream song), 1994
- "Blame It on Me" (George Ezra song), 2014
- "Blame It on Me", a 1992 song by Barenaked Ladies from the album Gordon
- "Blame It on Me", a 2018 song by Post Malone from the album Beerbongs & Bentleys
- "Blame It on Me", a 2023 song by Twice from the EP Ready to Be
