= Steve Bray =

British anti-Brexit activist (born 1969)

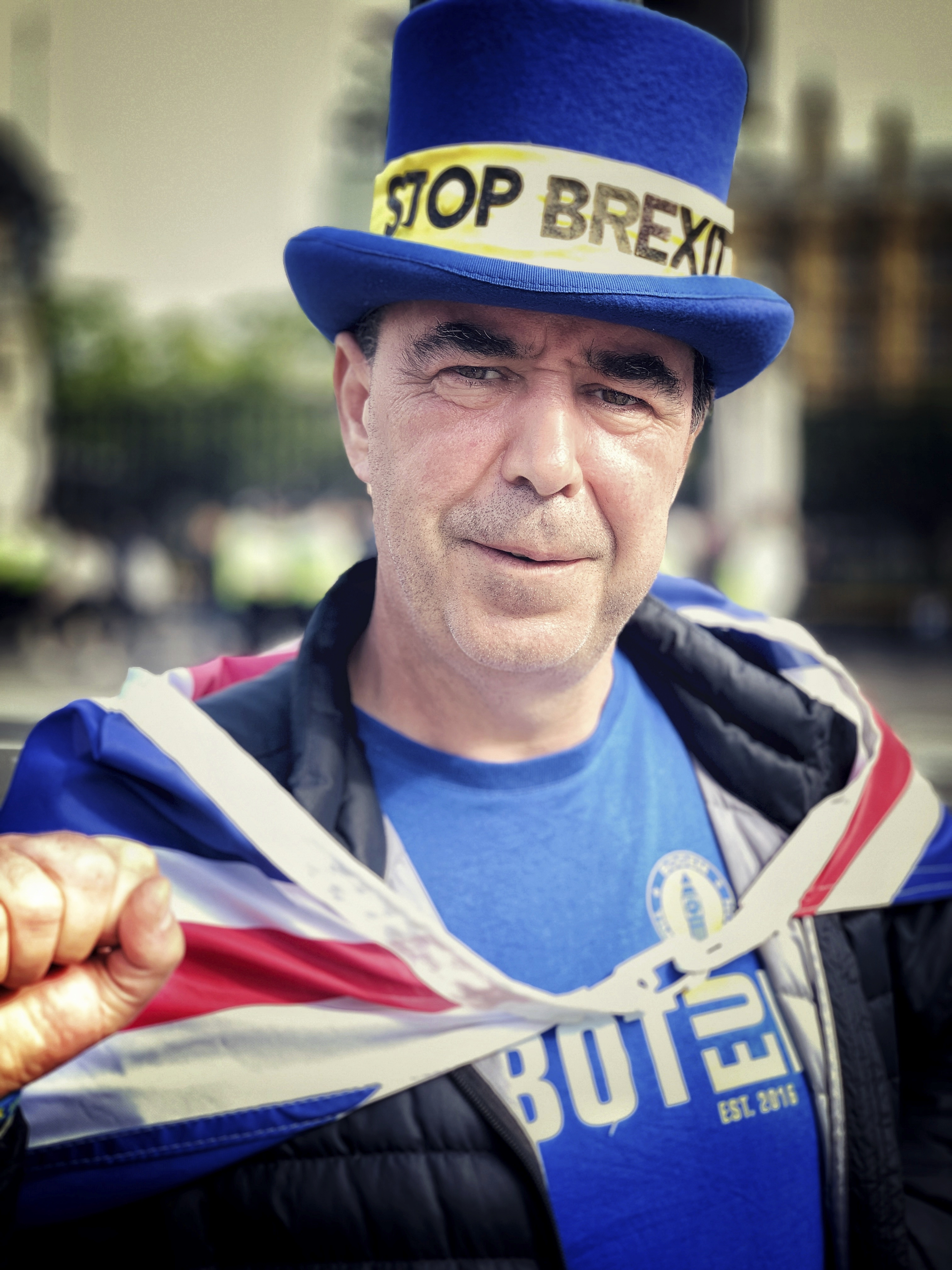
- Bray in 2019

Leader of SODEM
- Incumbent
- Assumed office September 2017
- Preceded by: Position founded

Personal details
- Born: Steven Nicholas Bray; 26 June 1969 (age 57) Splott, Cardiff, Wales
- Party: Liberal Democrats
- Other political affiliations: SODEM
- Occupation: Activist
- Known for: Protesting against Brexit

Steven Nicholas Bray (born 26 June 1969) is a British Liberal Democrat activist from Port Talbot in South Wales who, in 2018 and 2019, made daily protests against Brexit in College Green, Westminster. He is variously known as Stop Brexit Man, Mr Stop Brexit, or the Stop Brexit guy. He currently serves as leader of the Stand of Defiance European Movement, a pro-European Union movement.

Bray was often heard during TV broadcasts from College Green at Westminster shouting anti-Brexit statements or seen quietly walking into the background of live TV interviews, wearing a colourful blue outfit and carrying placards with a simple 'Stop Brexit' or anti-government message. After Brexit, he protested against the incumbent Conservative government more generally. In May 2024, Bray disrupted Prime Minister Rishi Sunak's announcement of a July election with D:Ream's song "Things Can Only Get Better", a song used extensively by the Labour Party during its 1997 election campaign. He was subsequently banned from every street around Whitehall and Parliament.

British broadcaster ITV has referred to him as a notable figure, both for the length of his continuing protest and for the technique he used to disrupt multi-camera interviews. The Huffington Post described him as the "ultimate Brexit protester", while Labour MP Ben Bradshaw has called him an international personality. In late 2020 he changed his trademark EU-blue outfit for a full Soviet-era Russian general's uniform, complete with medals, as he called for the Government to investigate alleged Russian interference in the 2016 Brexit referendum. Bray was the unsuccessful Liberal Democrat candidate for the Cynon Valley constituency in the 2019 general election.

== Before the Brexit referendum ==
Steve Bray was born in June 1969, and was originally from Splott in Cardiff, South Wales. As a child, he moved home frequently while his father served at RAF bases in Germany. Before becoming involved in political activism, Bray himself served in the British Army, and was a self-employed numismatist, working in Port Talbot, South Wales. Bray is divorced, with a daughter and grandson.

When Brexit became a major political issue, Bray found himself at odds with many of his friends. In his own words, "I fell out with all my friends. They were all leavers and I binned the lot of them." His opposition to Brexit was in part due to a belief in the benefits European Union funding had provided to Port Talbot, and a sense that the leave campaigns were misrepresenting the benefits of Brexit.

== Dress and style of protest ==
Bray shouting outside the Palace of Westminster

Bray has worn a European Blue jacket, and a blue top-hat with a yellow hat-band. He has a cape made up from a Union Jack sewn into an EU flag. He carried two double-sided, burgundy-coloured, A2-sized placards with the messages "Stop the BREXIT mess", "We want a people's vote", and "Things have changed, it is time to reassess".

== 2017 to 2019 ==
In March 2017, Prime Minister Theresa May triggered Article 50 of the Lisbon Treaty, formally initiating Britain's withdrawal from the European Union, following the result of the 2016 referendum on the UK's EU membership. Bray was incensed, leaving Port Talbot and travelling to London to protest. He later said he had never attended a demonstration prior to beginning his Brexit protest. Bray paid £8,500 to have a float carrying a larger than life size model of May's head with a pistol marked with the word "Brexit" in its mouth to be brought to the UK. Following the 2017 general election and the Conservative–DUP agreement, Bray lived on the streets in London, refusing to spend money or pay taxes, for a week in protest, during which time he began protesting outside the Houses of Parliament. During the first year of his protest, Bray and allies were present outside Parliament five days a week. When May announced her resignation in July 2019, Bray shouted "Stop Brexit!"

Camera teams from all news sources interview politicians on College Green, outside the Houses of Parliament. When Bray spotted a team arriving, he walked over, and as the live interview began, appeared in the background of the shot, displaying his posters. As the camera moved, so did he, remaining in the frame. He then walked off before the team could ask the police to remove him. With a two-camera interview, he knew which camera was live and moved from one to the other. In an incident on 14 November 2018, with Brexit expert Georgina Wright being interviewed by BBC News presenter Annita McVeigh, the camera-hopping lasted over two minutes.

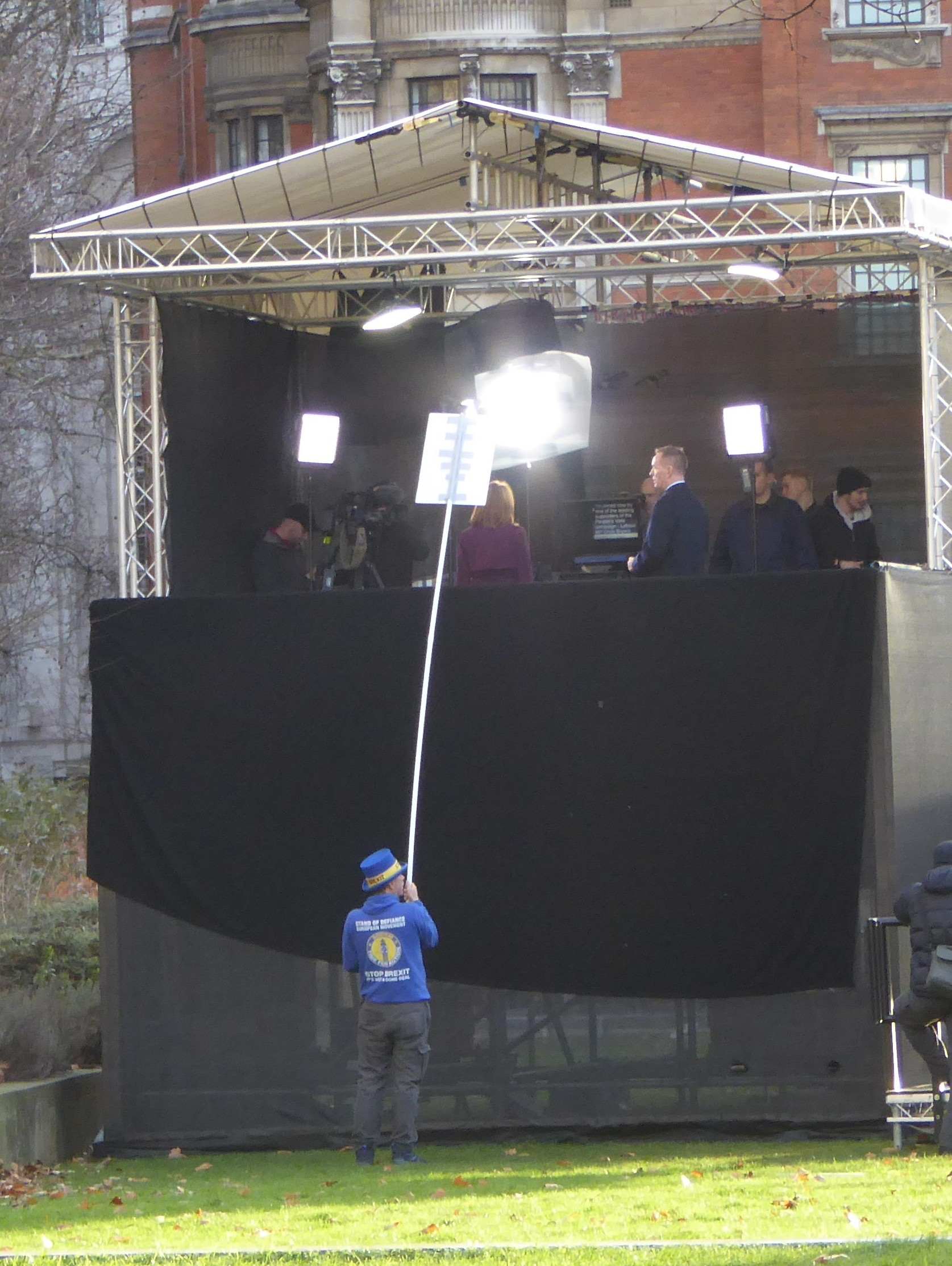
Bray standing in front of the Sky TV media tent during an interview between Kay Burley and Labour MP Chris Bryant, on the day that Jeremy Corbyn called a vote of no confidence in the government.

When the camera team chose to film against the door of the Palace, Bray used another tactic. He stood close by and shouted "Stop Brexit" over a loudhailer, interfering with the soundtrack.

The BBC tried to circumvent Bray's disruption by building a five-metre-high (16 ft) platform on which to conduct interviews. Bray was not deterred, and raised the EU flag on a 5-metre-high pole, which could be seen waving behind the presenter.

Every evening at around 6 pm he performed a ritual, approaching the Palace and shouting "Stop Brexit, it's not a done deal", before leaving. He returned at 11 am the following morning and stated he would continue to do so until another referendum were called.

In January 2019, Bray moved into an apartment opposite the Westminster home of Conservative Brexiteer Jacob Rees-Mogg. To rent the property in Westminster's Cowley Street for two months, he raised more than £12,000 from the public. In response to the news of his new neighbour, Rees-Mogg said: "Should he wish to borrow a cup of sugar, he would be very welcome."

== 2019 general election ==
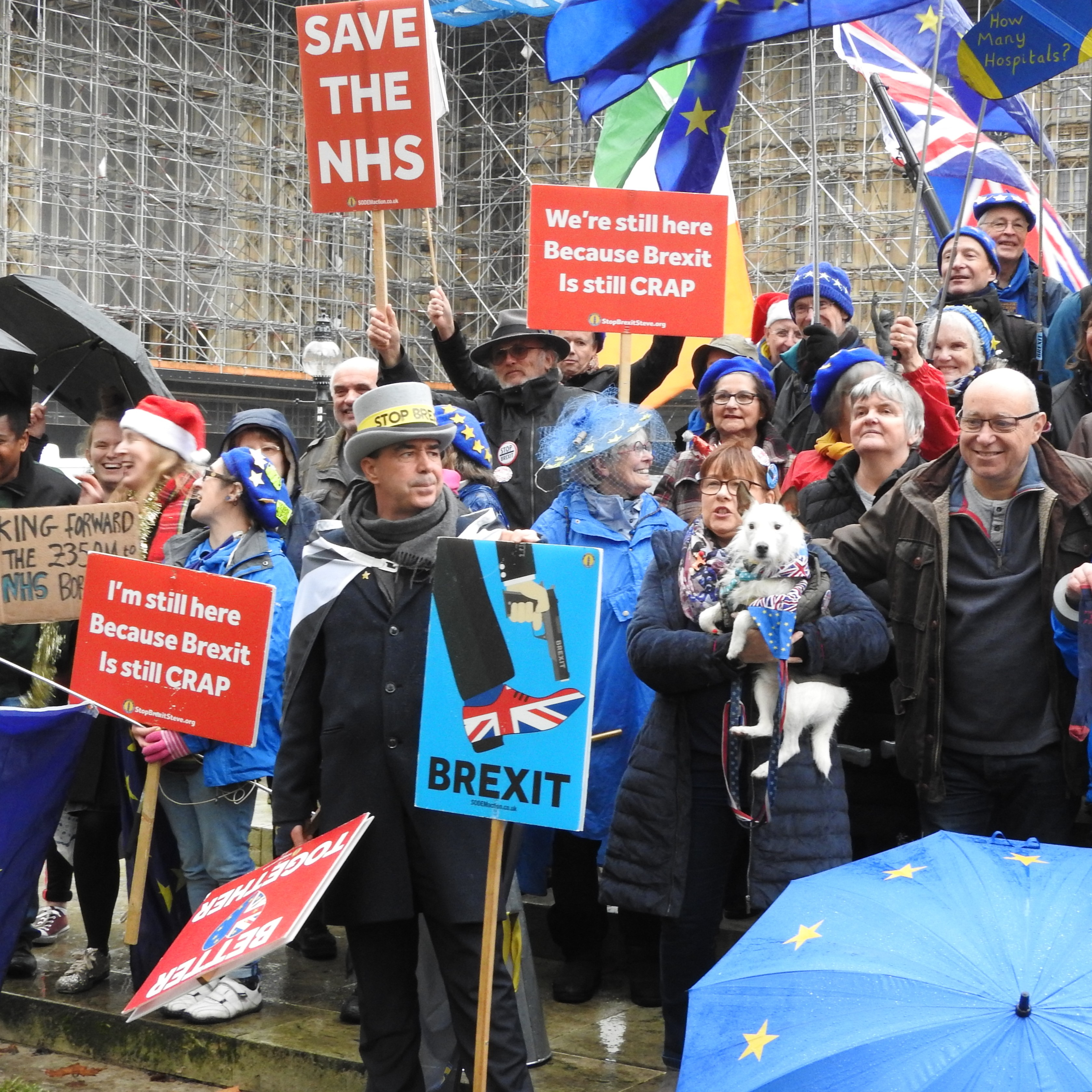
Regular SODEM protestors; Steve Bray in his post election grey attire, December 2019

Steve Bray was the Liberal Democrat candidate for the Cynon Valley constituency in the 2019 general election. The then Liberal Democrat leader, Jo Swinson, noted that Bray was a passionate campaigner and should not be seen as a joke candidate. He came sixth of seven candidates with 949 votes, 3.1% of the total, and lost his deposit. Madeline Grant, writing in The Daily Telegraph, argued that the Liberal Democrats' decision to run Bray, whom she did not see as a serious candidate, was part of their disastrous campaign.

Bray described the Conservative victory in the 2019 general election as "devastating". Shortly after the result, he acknowledged that the chances of the UK remaining in the EU were "tiny" and offered that "we are all going to end up in hell after Brexit happens." Bray decided to end his daily protests after 847 days. However, he vowed to keep protesting, ditching his message of stopping Brexit in favour of an anti-Boris Johnson slogan.

== 2020 onwards ==
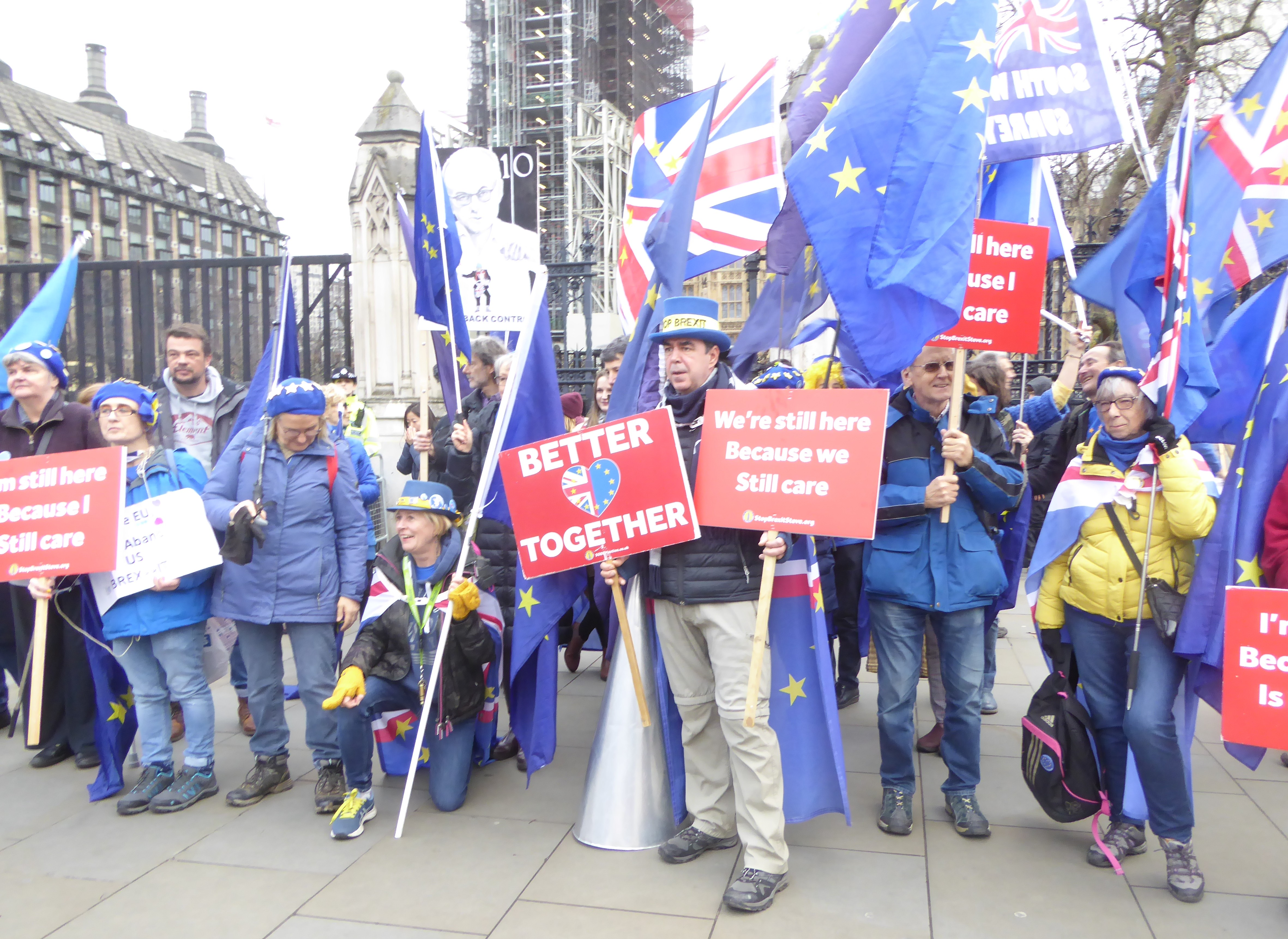
January 2020, in support of EU Commission President, Ursula von der Leyen on the occasion of her London visit

On 31 January 2020, the United Kingdom became the first member state to leave the EU. In response, Bray vowed to continue protesting outside Parliament, noting that he would "not give up" until the UK rejoined the EU.

On 18 January Bray was tripped up and assaulted in central London, suffering minor injuries. He described the alleged assailants as "unpleasant thugs masquerading as Brexit zealots" and noted that "they're not real Brexiteers or leavers." No arrests were made at the time.

To highlight the report on alleged Russian interference in the Brexit referendum, in the autumn of 2020 Bray discarded his anti-Brexit top hat and cape in favour of a Soviet tank general's parade dress. Armed with a portable stereo, Bray took to blaring out the national anthem of the former USSR along Whitehall. However, by December 2020, Bray was back in usual anti-Brexit attire and attempting to heckle the Prime Minister by means of a megaphone, some distance from 10 Downing Street.

In June 2021, Bray spotted the then Conservative MP Lee Anderson having a drink seated outside the Red Lion pub in Westminster. Bray asked Anderson: "Have you got to be a Conservative MP to lie to people?" After some words were exchanged, Anderson said "You're nothing but a parasite, a malingerer and a scrounger. Now clear off."

At the Labour Party Conference in September 2021, a complaint was filed with Brighton and Hove City Council about the noise Bray was making in playing the Anthem of Europe on his speaker system outside the conference.

On 26 October 2021, Bray demonstrated, with a toilet, outside the gates of Downing Street after MPs voted down an attempt by the House of Lords to toughen up the approach to the discharge of raw sewage into rivers and coastal waters.

In May 2022, Conservative MP Marco Longhi called for Bray to be "locked up in the Tower [of London] with a loudspeaker playing "Land of Hope and Glory" on repeat at maximum volume" because of the disruption he causes. He added that staff in his Westminster office could not hear "distressed constituents on the phone" because of the loud music that Bray played.

While protesting near Parliament on 28 June 2022, Bray had his amplification equipment seized by police under the Police, Crime, Sentencing and Courts Act, which had come into force earlier that day. Bray described the police powers introduced in the Act as "fascist" and an attack on the right to protest. His liberty to protest has been defended by Gus Carter in The Spectator who considered that his post-Brexit protests were a joke and as ineffective as a Japanese soldier fighting on many years after the end of World War II but nonetheless in the tradition of English political eccentricity.

On 6 July 2022, Bray played a rendition of "Bye Bye Baby" by the Bay City Rollers on Good Morning Britain that was changed to say "Bye Bye Boris", this same song was played on 7 July upon Boris Johnson's resignation as Prime Minister of the United Kingdom. On 7 July, at the request of actor Hugh Grant, Bray played the Benny Hill theme tune "Yakety Sax" following the announcement by Boris Johnson that he was resigning as prime minister. In an interview in The Guardian in July 2022, Bray said Brexit had been "the start of something far bigger" and had indicated wider flaws in the British political system. In September 2022, Bray told foreign secretary James Cleverly that "your party is finished – the sooner you're out of the UK the better", which Cleverly perceived as a racist "go home" comment. Bray denied the claim and posted a video of the full exchange online, saying that he had previously made the same comment to Jacob Rees-Mogg and Dominic Raab.

On 26 October 2022, Bray played "I Predict a Riot" by the Kaiser Chiefs during Liz Truss's resignation speech as Prime Minister.

In October 2023, Bray attended the Conservative Party Conference in Manchester while wearing a shirt bearing pro-EU slogans to ask attendees "Where are the Brexit benefits?". He then had a physical altercation with an attendee and was escorted off the premises while continuing to protest.

On 20 March 2024, after repeated warnings, the Metropolitan Police seized Bray's amplifying equipment as he was using the equipment in an area where its use was prohibited, namely Parliament Square. Bray was subsequently charged with failing to comply with police directions for having continued his protest after being told by officers it was prohibited. He was acquitted of the charge following a trial in 2025 during which he represented himself.

In May 2024, Bray disrupted Prime Minister Rishi Sunak's announcement of a July election with D:Ream's song "Things Can Only Get Better", a Labour Party theme song during its 1997 election campaign. He was subsequently banned from every street around Whitehall and Parliament. In a statement Bray later said: "Police just served an order on me and banned me from every street around Whitehall and Parliament.

In June 2026, Bray again disrupted a Downing Street statement, Prime Minister Keir Starmer's resignation by playing the European Union anthem Ode to Joy, which Bray said was "not disrespectful". Bray also disrupted the first speech as Prime Minister of Starmer's successor, Andy Burnham by singing the EU anthem.

== SODEM ==
SODEM is a grassroots movement founded by Steve Bray in September 2017. It is an acronym for Stand of Defiance European Movement, and its colours are yellow on blue. It was responsible for secretly placing the European flag on an empty flagpole outside the Neath Port Talbot County Borough Council offices, on 19 August 2018. Elspeth Williams, who shared a flat in London with Bray and other protestors, ran SODEM's social media output. SODEM was dissolved as a company in January 2021, though it continues to exist as a grassroots movement.

== See also ==
- Brian Haw, a Parliament Square anti-war protestor
