= Across the Bridge of Hope =

Compilation album by Various artists
- Released: July 13, 1999
- Genre: Rock
- Label: White Records

Across the Bridge of Hope is a compilation album created and recorded in support of victims of the Omagh bombing, by Tim Hegarty and Ross Graham. The album was released on July 13, 1999, by White Records. The album included various songs by Irish artists, as well as two poem recitations by actor Liam Neeson. The album draws its name from a line from the second of these two poems, written by twelve-year-old Sean McLaughlin, who wrote it shortly before he was killed in the bombing. The album also includes a song with the title "Across the Bridge of Hope", written and produced by B. A. Robertson, and sung by the Omagh Community Youth Choir.

The first track features a recitation of Seamus Heaney's poem "A Cure at Troy" by Liam Neeson. The second track is a Sinéad O'Connor cover of "Chiquitita". Van Morrison recorded an acoustic version of "The Healing Game" for this album. Also included were "Please" sung by the group U2, "The Island", by Paul Brady, and a version of "Silent Night", sung by Enya.

The money raised by the sales from the album were donated to the Omagh Fund, which supported the victims of the bombing.

== Track listing ==
No.	Title	Writer(s)	Length
1.	"The Cure at Troy (poem)"	Seamus Heaney	0:54
2.	"Chiquitita"	Björn Ulvaeus, Benny Andersson	4:21
3.	"Sunrise"	Neil Hannon	3:17
4.	"Words"	Barry Gibb, Robin Gibb, Maurice Gibb	4:02
5.	"What Can I Do?"	The Corrs	4:18
6.	"Beyond the Great Divide"	Daniel O'Donnell	3:22
7.	"The Healing Game (Alternative Acoustic Version)"	Van Morrison	5:16
8.	"I'm Gonna Fall"	Ash	5:13
9.	"Please"	U2	5:10
10.	"Broken Things"	Julie Miller	3:11
11.	"The Island"	Paul Brady	5:28
12.	"The Bridge (poem)"	Sean McLaughlin	0:13
13.	"Across the Bridge of Hope"	B. A. Robertson	4:48
14.	"Silent Night"	Franz Gruber, John Young	3:45
