= D Ream =

Irish-English pop group

D:Ream
- Origin: Manchester, England
- Genres: Pop, dance, soul
- Years active: 1991–1997; 2008–present
- Labels: Magnet/FXU; Sire/Giant/Warner Bros.
- Members: Peter Cunnah; Al Mackenzie
- Past members: Alex Leam
- Website: d-ream.co.uk

D:Ream are a Northern Irish pop and dance group. They achieved a UK No. 1 hit with "Things Can Only Get Better" in 1994. Eight further top 40 hits followed, including "U R the Best Thing", "Take Me Away" and "Shoot Me with Your Love". Their two 1990s studio albums both reached the UK top five.

The group had a line-up that varied in number but was centred on lead singer and instrumentalist Peter Cunnah. Live and session keyboard player Brian Cox became an academic and science broadcaster on television.

== Early career ==
In 1992, D:Ream released the single "U R the Best Thing", a piano-house track that did not chart, but due to a Sasha remix, it was Pete Tong's Essential Tune of 1992. "Things Can Only Get Better", released in the spring of 1993, gave the group their first chart success. "U R the Best Thing" was eventually re-released in April 1993 and became the group's second chart hit. In 1994, they were nominated for Best Dance Act at the MTV Europe Music Awards, and then for Best Single at the 1995 BRIT Awards.

The band's first album, D:Ream on Volume 1, which was promoted for almost two years, produced seven singles ("Star" and "I Like It" were issued together as a double A-side). It was the track "Things Can Only Get Better" that brought them UK success and international recognition. After supporting Take That on their tour, "Things Can Only Get Better" topped the UK Singles Chart in early 1994. Originally released in early 1993, when the track reached No. 24 in the UK, it was later adopted by the Labour Party as their theme for the 1997 UK general election, and consequently released for a third time, this time reaching No. 19 on the UK chart. In May 2024, the same song was played during Rishi Sunak's announcement of a general election in July 2024 by Steve Bray.

The band released two studio albums, D:Ream on Volume 1 (1992) and World (1995), ten different singles, two of which were released three times, and an official greatest hits album, The Best of D:Ream. In 1997, the group's record label issued their first compilation, The Best of D:Ream. In 2006, a second collection appeared as part of The Platinum Collection series.

When D:Ream broke through into the charts, the band's main touring line-up consisted of core members Peter Cunnah (vocalist, songwriter) and Al Mackenzie (musician). Brian Cox was a live and session keyboardist for several years while working towards his physics PhD, before being replaced by Simon Ellis. Other players included Derek Chai on bass, Alex Leam on triangle, Nick Shaw on vocals and drummer Mark Roberts. The group also used a number of guest vocalists, such as T.J. Davis, who is featured as co-lead vocalist on "The Power (Of All the Love in the World)", one of the singles from their second album.

== Reunion, and split-up ==
In 2008, D:Ream reformed after a chance meeting between Cunnah and Mackenzie. Their single "All Things to All Men" was released on 7 September 2009 on their own label, User Records. They released the album In Memory Of... in 2011 and also planned concert dates to follow. Meanwhile, Cox became a physics professor and science broadcaster who has worked on the Large Hadron Collider project. In late 2010 he announced that he would provide some keyboard work for the new album, but would not be joining the band full-time. As part of their 2012 commitments, the band played main support to Wheatus at the LeeStock Music Festival in Sudbury, Suffolk.

On 23 July 2021, Cunnah and Mackenzie released a new studio album, Open Hearts Open Minds.

The band stated in June 2024 that they regretted the use of the song "Things Can Only Get Better" in political campaigns and would not grant permission for it to be used in future campaigns.

== Discography ==
=== Studio albums ===
Year	Album title	UK	AUS	GER
1993	D:Ream on Volume 1	5	12	69
1995	World	5	155	—
2011	In Memory Of...	—	—	—
2021	Open Hearts Open Minds	—	—	—
2025	Do It Anyway	—	—	—
"—" denotes releases that did not chart or were not released.

=== Compilations ===
Year	Album title
1997	The Best of D:Ream
2006	The Platinum Collection
2011	Things Can Only Get Better: The Very Best of D:Ream
2023	Broken Hearts & Messed Up Minds – The Remix Album
2023	The Best Thing

=== Extended plays ===
Title	EP details
4 Things 2 Come	Released: 26 October 1992; Label: FXU; Formats: 12" vinyl

=== Singles ===
Year	Title	Chart positions										Album
Year	Title	UK	UK Dance	AUS	BEL (FL)	EUR	EDR	GER	IRE	SWI	US Dance	Album
1992	"U R the Best Thing"	72	4	–	–	–	–	–	–	–	–	D:Ream On Vol. 1
1993	"Things Can Only Get Better"	24	1	–	–	–	–	–	–	–	7	D:Ream On Vol. 1
1993	"U R the Best Thing" (re-release)	19	1	–	50	62	11	–	6	–	1	D:Ream On Vol. 1
1993	"Unforgiven"	29	4	–	–	65	–	–	–	–	–	D:Ream On Vol. 1
1993	"Star / I Like It"	26	2	–	–	88	–	–	–	–	–	D:Ream On Vol. 1
1993	"Things Can Only Get Better" (re-release)	1	1	9	10	5	22	20	2	11	–	D:Ream On Vol. 1
1994	"U R the Best Thing (Perfecto Remix)"	4	7	9	46	13	–	65	6	35	–	D:Ream On Vol. 1
1994	"Take Me Away"	18	6	52	–	60	16	–	30	–	–	D:Ream On Vol. 1
1994	"Blame It on Me"	25	15	–	–	74	–	–	–	–	–	D:Ream On Vol. 1
1995	"Shoot Me with Your Love"	7	3	73	–	26	3	73	16	45	4	World
1995	"Party Up the World"	20	–	122	–	–	–	–	24	–	–	World
1995	"The Power (Of All the Love in the World)"	40	–	150	–	–	–	–	–	–	–	World
1997	"Things Can Only Get Better" (re-release)	19	30	–	–	–	–	–	–	–	–	The Best of D:Ream Vol. 1
2009	"All Things to All Men"	–	–	–	–	–	–	–	–	–	–	In Memory Of...
2010	"Drop Beatz Not Bombs"	–	–	–	–	–	–	–	–	–	–	In Memory Of...
2011	"Gods in the Making"	–	–	–	–	–	–	–	–	–	–	In Memory Of...
2011	"Sleepy Head"	–	–	–	–	–	–	–	–	–	–	In Memory Of...
2014	"Things Can Only Get Better" (re-release)	66	–	–	–	–	–	–	–	–	–	D:Ream On Vol. 1
2021	"Meet Me at Midnight"	–	–	–	–	–	–	–	–	–	–	Open Hearts Open Minds
2021	"Many Hands"	–	–	–	–	–	–	–	–	–	–	Open Hearts Open Minds
2021	"I Used to Believe in Love"	–	–	–	–	–	–	–	–	–	–	Open Hearts Open Minds
2022	"Pedestal"	–	–	–	–	–	–	–	–	–	–	Do It Anyway
2025	"Do It Anyway"	–	–	–	–	–	–	–	–	–	–	Do It Anyway
"—" denotes releases that did not chart or were not released.

== See also ==
- List of number-one dance hits (United States)
- List of artists who reached number one on the US Dance chart
