= The Tyrrel Corporation =

English band

- Origin: Redcar, England
- Genres: Downtempo, house, pop, soul
- Years active: 1990–1995
- Labels: Cooltempo, Chrysalis
- Members: Joe Watson; Tony Barry

The Tyrrel Corporation were an English recording duo, composed of members Joe Watson (vocals/keyboards) and Tony Barry (keyboards). The group took their (misspelled) name from a fictional company in the 1982 film Blade Runner.

== Career ==
Between 1992 and 1995, five of the group's singles charted on the UK Singles Chart. Their most successful release was 1995's "Better Days Ahead", which reached the top 30. The group recorded two albums, North East of Eden (1992), and Play for Today (1995).

== Discography ==
=== Albums ===
- North East of Eden (1992) – AUS No. 273
- Play for Today (1995)

=== Singles ===
Year	Single	Peak chart positions			Album
Year	Single	UK	AUS	US Dance	Album
1991	"Six O'Clock"	—	161	—	North East of Eden
1992	"The Bottle"	71	199	—	North East of Eden
1992	"Going Home"	58	182	—	North East of Eden
1992	"Waking with a Stranger"/"One Day"	59	—	—	North East of Eden
1994	"You're Not Here"	42	225	—	Play for Today
1995	"Better Days Ahead"	29	—	31	Play for Today
"—" denotes releases that did not chart or were not released in that country.
