= Tom Frederikse =

Tom Frederikse is an electronic music producer who produced remixes for Sasha in the early 1990s on Sasha's single "Appolonia" as well as working with him on records including The Qat Collection. He has also done work for D:Ream other large labels such as Atlantic Records and Virgin Records UK. He also co-authored "How to DJ : The Insider's Guide to Success on the Decks".
