= Peter Cunnah =

British musician (born 1966)

- Born: 30 August 1966 (age 59); Derry, Northern Ireland
- Genres: Pop; synthpop; dance
- Occupation: Musician
- Instruments: Vocals; keyboards; guitar
- Years active: 1982–present
- Label: Magnet
- Member of: D:Ream
- Formerly of: Tie the Boy; Shane

Peter Cunnah (born 30 August 1966) is a Northern Irish musician and lead singer of the dance-pop duo D:Ream.

== D:Ream ==
Prior to forming D:Ream, he was lead guitarist with Belfast-based band Tie the Boy, who formed in 1982 and were briefly signed to the Mother Records label, owned by U2. When that deal foundered soon after the band's move from Belfast to London, in-fighting amongst the members led rapidly to its split.

Finding himself in the heart of London's clubland, Cunnah, already a producer, originally conceived D:Ream as a way of re-using songs from his previous band. With little by way of support in London, he teamed up with DJ Al Mackenzie on a series of dance records by a 'faceless' dance act which would be fronted live and on-record by a diva, leaving Cunnah free to concentrate on songwriting and production and Mackenzie on building a DJ reputation.

However, after a live date when Cunnah stepped up to sing, he found himself enjoying the experience and rapidly remodelled the D:Ream concept around his own vocals. Initially performing as a duo, they received acclaim in clubs and found management and record and publishing deals.

== Solo work ==
Cunnah subsequently developed solo and collaborative material while working as a writer and producer behind the scenes, including singles and album tracks for the pop groups Steps and A1. He sang lead vocals on Chicane's 2003 single "Love on the Run", which reached No.33 in the United Kingdom and No.43 in Ireland. A song cowritten by Cunnah for Australian singer Sophie Monk, "Come My Way", was subsequently covered by Japanese singer Namie Amuro and used as an opening song for the anime InuYasha.

Cunnah returned to live performances with guitar-based band Shane, whose debut single "The Weight of This" was released in May 2006. Shane sees Cunnah going back to his roots. He has two old friends in the band – Paul Greendale on guitar and Mark Roberts on drums. Cunnah knew Roberts from their time in the rock band Tie The Boy. Cunnah has also produced the YouTube star Ben Kelly, a contestant on The Voice UK.

== Personal life ==
In 2026, it was reported by BBC News that Cunnah had met his biological father, Patrick Hanna, after a decades-long search for his birth parents. The report also stated that he met his half-brother, musician Stuart Zender, a former bass player with Jamiroquai, and his half-sister, singer and songwriter Philippa Hanna.
