= Magnet Records =

British record label

Magnet Records logo

Magnet Records was a British record label, started in 1973 by Michael Levy and Peter Shelley. It was acquired by Warner Bros. Records in 1988 for an estimated £10m.

Artists on the label included Alvin Stardust, Stevenson's Rocket, Matchbox, Adrian Baker, Silver Convention, Guys 'n' Dolls, Darts, Kissing the Pink, Bad Manners, David D'Or, Blue Zoo and Chris Rea, who all achieved success during the 1970s and 1980s. Successful 1990s band D:Ream were signed to a later incarnation of the label.

Music management expert Kim Glover began her music career working for Michael Levy in the radio promotions department, and eventually ended up as Head of TV and Radio for Magnet, creating campaigns for all the artists signed to the label. Pete Waterman also worked for the label during the mid-1970s, as his first break in the recording business.

The unrelated British reggae label Magnet Records was started in 1971 by R. A. Coke, and was based in Stoke Newington, North London.
