= Madness discography =

Discography of English band Madness

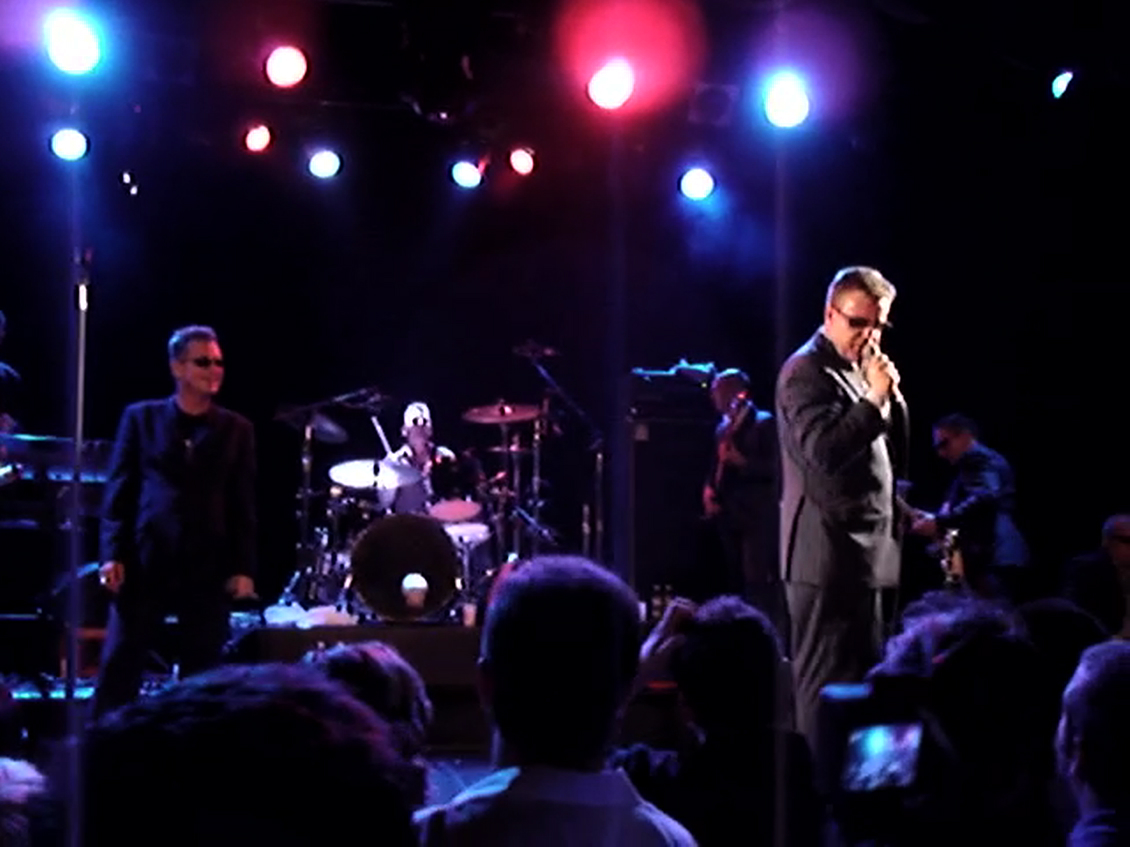
- Madness performing at Bimbos in 2005
- Studio albums: 13
- Extended plays: 3
- Soundtrack albums: 2
- Live albums: 4
- Compilation albums: 19
- Singles: 43
- Video albums: 5
- Music videos: 37
- Box sets: 4

The discography of Madness, a British pop/ska band, comprises 13 studio albums, 19 compilation albums, four live albums, two soundtrack albums, four box sets, three extended plays, 43 singles, five video albums and 37 music videos.

== Albums ==
=== Studio albums ===
Title	Album details	Chart positions											Certifications (sales thresholds)
Title	Album details	UK	AUS	BEL	CAN	GER	IRE	NED	NZ	NOR	SWE	US	Certifications (sales thresholds)
One Step Beyond...	Released: 19 October 1979; Label: Stiff	2	29	—	—	14	—	22	27	24	12	128	BPI: Platinum; SNEP: Gold
Absolutely	Released: 26 September 1980; Label: Stiff	2	56	—	—	21	—	2	31	26	15	146	BPI: Platinum
7	Released: 2 October 1981; Label: Stiff	5	35	—	—	—	—	5	—	—	41	—	BPI: Gold
The Rise & Fall	Released: 5 November 1982; Label: Stiff	10	28	—	—	15	—	—	29	34	1	—	BPI: Gold
Keep Moving	Released: 20 February 1984; Label: Stiff	6	94	—	66	47	—	—	—	—	29	109	BPI: Silver
Mad Not Mad	Released: 30 September 1985; Label: Zarjazz	16	66	—	—	—	—	—	—	—	42	—	BPI: Silver
The Madness (as The Madness)	Released: 3 May 1988; Label: Virgin	65	—	—	—	—	—	—	—	—	—	—	
Wonderful	Released: 1 November 1999; Label: Virgin	17	—	—	—	—	—	—	—	—	—	—	BPI: Silver
The Dangermen Sessions Vol. 1	Released: 1 August 2005; Label: V2	11	—	39	—	81	39	59	—	—	—	—	
The Liberty of Norton Folgate	Released: 18 May 2009; Label: Lucky Seven	5	—	70	—	—	31	52	—	—	47	—	BPI: Gold
Oui Oui, Si Si, Ja Ja, Da Da	Released: 29 October 2012; Label: Lucky Seven	10	—	140	—	—	25	37	—	—	—	—	BPI: Gold
Can't Touch Us Now	Released: 28 October 2016; Label: Lucky Seven	5	—	141	—	—	25	—	—	—	—	—	BPI: Silver
Theatre of the Absurd Presents C'est la Vie	Released: 17 November 2023; Label: BMG	1	—	172	—	40	73	88	—	—	—	—	

=== Live albums ===
Title	Album details	Chart positions
Title	Album details	UK
Dance Craze	Released: 1981; Label: 2-Tone / Chrysalis; Formats: LP	5
Madstock!	Released: November 1992; Label: Go! Discs; Formats: LP, CD	22
Universal Madness	Released: 1999; Label: Golden Voice; Formats: CD	—
Madness Live: To the Edge of the Universe and Beyond (Inlay in The Mail on Sunday)	Released: 2006; Label: The Mail on Sunday; Formats: CD	—

=== Soundtrack albums ===
Title	Album details	Chart positions	Certifications (sales thresholds)
Title	Album details	UK	Certifications (sales thresholds)
Our House	Released: October 2002; Label: Virgin; Formats: CD	45	BPI: Silver
Take It or Leave It	Released: October 2013; Label: Union Square; Formats: CD/DVD	77	
The Get Up!	Released: November 2022; Label: Union Square; Formats: CD/DVD	97	

=== Compilation albums ===
Title	Album details	Chart positions									Certifications (sales thresholds)
Title	Album details	UK	AUS	CAN	FRA	IRE	NED	NZ	NOR	US	Certifications (sales thresholds)
Complete Madness	Released: April 1982; Label: Stiff	1	2	—	—	—	7	11	—	—	BPI: Platinum; ARIA: Platinum
Madness	Released: January 1983; Label: Geffen	—	—	48	—	—	—	—	—	41	
Utter Madness	Released: November 1986; Label: Zarjazz/Virgin	29	—	—	—	—	—	24	—	—	BPI: Gold
It's... Madness	Released: September 1990; Label: Virgin	—	—	—	—	—	—	—	—	—	BPI: Gold
It's... Madness Too	Released: October 1991; Label: Virgin	—	—	—	—	—	—	—	—	—	BPI: Gold
Divine Madness	Released: February 1992; Label: Virgin	1	37	—	1	—	56	7	—	—	BPI: 3× Platinum; SNEP: 2× Gold
Total Madness	Released: September 1997; Label: Geffen	—	—	—	—	—	—	—	—	—	
The Heavy Heavy Hits	Released: June 1998; Label: Virgin	19	—	—	—	—	—	—	20	—	BPI: Gold
Complete Madness (re-issue)	Released: April 2009; Label: Union Square	38	—	—	—	—	—	—	—	—	
Total Madness	Released: October 2009; Label: Union Square	11	—	—	—	62	—	—	—	—	BPI: Platinum
Ultimate Madness	Released: June 2010; Label: Union Square	27	—	—	—	—	—	—	—	—	BPI: Silver
Forever Young: The Ska Collection	Released: September 2012; Label: Union Square	99	—	—	—	—	—	—	—	—	
The Very Best of Madness	Released: April 2014; Label: Union Square	—	—	—	—	—	—	—	—	—	BPI: Gold
Full House: The Very Best of Madness	Released: 17 November 2017; Label: Union Square	23	—	—	—	—	—	—	—	—	BPI: Platinum
I Do Like to Be B-Side the A-Side	Released: Record Store Day 2018; Label: Union Square	—	—	—	—	—	—	—	—	—	
Our House: The Very Best of Madness	Released: March 2021; Label: BMG	—	—	—	—	—	—	—	—	—	
I Do Like to Be B-Side the A-Side Volume 2	Released: Record Store Day 2021; Label: Warner Music/ADA	—	—	—	—	—	—	—	—	—	
I Do Like to Be B-Side the A-Side Volume 3	Released: Record Store Day 2023; Label: BMG/Union Square	—	—	—	—	—	—	—	—	—	
Hit Parade	Released: 21 November 2025; Label: Stirling Holdings/West Village Music Management	8	—	—	—	—	—	—	—	—	BPI: Silver

=== Box sets ===
Title	Album details	Certifications (sales thresholds)
The Business – the Definitive Singles Collection	Released: 1993; Label: Virgin; Formats: CD	
The Lot (Box Set: First 6 studio albums)	Released: 1999; Label: Virgin; Formats: CD	
The Singles Box: Vol. 1	Released: 2003; Label: Virgin; Formats: CD	
A Guided Tour of Madness	Released: 2011; Label: Union Square / Salvo; Formats: CD/DVD	BPI: Gold

== Extended plays ==
Title	EP details	Chart positions
Title	EP details	UK
Work Rest and Play	Released: March 1980; Label: Stiff; Formats: 7", 12", CD	6
The Peel Sessions	Released: 1986; Label: Strange Fruit; Formats: 12", CD	—
Theatre of the Absurd Introduces C'est La Vie	Released: October 2023; Label: BMG; Formats: CD	— (Note: Did not enter the Official Singles Chart, but peaked at number 1 on the Official Physical Singles Chart.)

== Singles ==
Year	Single	Chart positions										Certifications	Album
Year	Single	UK	AUS	BEL	CAN	FRA	IRE	NED	NZ	SWI	US	Certifications	Album
1979	"The Prince"	16	—	—	—	—	—	—	—	—	—		One Step Beyond...
1979	"One Step Beyond"	7	—	—	—	1	28	29	—	3	—	BPI: Gold; SNEP: Gold	One Step Beyond...
1980	"My Girl"	3	—	—	—	—	3	—	46	—	—	BPI: Silver	One Step Beyond...
1980	"Night Boat to Cairo"	6	—	25	—	—	12	29	—	—	—	BPI: Silver	One Step Beyond...
1980	"Baggy Trousers"	3	30	23	—	30	5	6	3	—	—	BPI: Gold	Absolutely
1980	"Embarrassment"	4	—	11	—	—	4	4	—	—	—	BPI: Gold	Absolutely
1981	"The Return of the Los Palmas 7"	7	—	—	—	—	13	—	—	—	—	BPI: Silver	Absolutely
1981	"Grey Day"	4	82	28	—	—	4	18	—	—	—	BPI: Silver	7
1981	"Shut Up"	7	—	38	—	—	3	25	—	—	—	BPI: Silver	7
1981	"It Must Be Love"	4	6	—	—	—	5	43	—	—	33	BPI: Platinum	Complete Madness
1982	"Cardiac Arrest"	14	—	24	—	—	4	26	—	—	—		7
1982	"House of Fun"	1	5	—	—	—	1	34	23	—	—	BPI: Silver	Complete Madness
1982	"Driving in My Car"	4	20	—	—	—	3	—	—	—	—	BPI: Silver	stand-alone single
1982	"Our House"	5	17	15	1	—	3	—	49	4	7	BPI: Platinum	The Rise & Fall
1983	"Tomorrow's (Just Another Day)"/ "Madness (Is All in the Mind)"	8	98	—	—	—	2	—	—	—	—		The Rise & Fall
1983	"Wings of a Dove"	2	72	32	—	41	1	—	—	—	—	BPI: Silver	stand-alone single (UK); Keep Moving (US version)
1983	"The Sun and the Rain"	5	—	—	—	—	8	—	—	—	72		stand-alone single (UK); Keep Moving (US version)
1984	"Michael Caine"	11	—	—	—	—	3	—	—	—	—		Keep Moving
1984	"One Better Day"	17	—	—	—	—	8	—	—	—	—		Keep Moving
1985	"Yesterday's Men"	18	54	28	—	—	7	41	38	—	—		Mad Not Mad
1985	"Uncle Sam"	21	—	—	—	—	17	—	—	—	—		Mad Not Mad
1986	"Sweetest Girl"	35	—	—	—	—	29	—	—	—	—		Mad Not Mad
1986	"(Waiting For) The Ghost Train"	18	—	—	—	—	9	—	—	—	—		Utter Madness
1992	"It Must Be Love" (re-issue)	6	48	—	—	—	14	—	21	—	—		Divine Madness
1992	"House of Fun" (re-issue)	40	73	—	—	—	27	—	—	—	—		Divine Madness
1992	"My Girl" (re-issue)	27	145	—	—	—	—	—	—	—	—		Divine Madness
1992	"The Harder They Come"	44	136	—	—	—	—	—	—	—	—		Madstock!
1993	"Night Boat to Cairo" (re-issue)	56	—	—	—	—	—	—	—	—	—		Divine Madness
1999	"Lovestruck"	10	—	—	—	—	—	—	—	—	—		Wonderful
1999	"Johnny the Horse"	44	—	—	—	—	—	—	—	—	—		Wonderful
2000	"Drip Fed Fred" (with Ian Dury)	55	—	—	—	—	—	—	—	—	—		Wonderful
2005	"Shame & Scandal"	38	—	56	—	12	—	100	—	69	—		The Dangermen Sessions Vol. 1
2005	"Girl Why Don't You"	—	—	—	—	—	—	—	—	—	—		The Dangermen Sessions Vol. 1
2007	"Sorry"	23	—	—	—	—	—	—	—	—	—		Non-album single
2008	"NW5"	24	—	—	—	—	—	—	—	—	—		The Liberty of Norton Folgate
2009	"Dust Devil"	64	—	—	—	—	—	—	—	—	—		The Liberty of Norton Folgate
2009	"Sugar and Spice"	—	—	—	—	—	—	—	—	—	—		The Liberty of Norton Folgate
2010	"Forever Young"	199	—	—	—	—	—	—	—	—	—		The Liberty of Norton Folgate
2012	"Our House" (digital re-entry)	—	—	—	—	132	—	—	—	—	—		Divine Madness
2012	"My Girl 2"	— (Note: "My Girl 2" didn't enter the Official Singles Chart, but it peaked at number 42 on the Official Independent Singles Chart.)	—	—	—	—	—	—	—	—	—		Oui Oui, Si Si, Ja Ja, Da Da
2013	"Never Knew Your Name"	88	—	—	—	174	—	—	—	—	—		Oui Oui, Si Si, Ja Ja, Da Da
2013	"How Can I Tell You"	—	—	—	—	—	—	—	—	—	—		Oui Oui, Si Si, Ja Ja, Da Da
2013	"Misery"	—	—	—	—	—	—	—	—	—	—		Oui Oui, Si Si, Ja Ja, Da Da
2013	"La Luna"	—	—	—	—	—	—	—	—	—	—		Oui Oui, Si Si, Ja Ja, Da Da
2016	"Mr Apples"	—	—	—	—	—	—	—	—	—	—		Can't Touch Us Now
2016	"Can't Touch Us Now"	—	—	—	—	—	—	—	—	—	—		Can't Touch Us Now
2017	"Another Version of Me"	—	—	—	—	—	—	—	—	—	—		Can't Touch Us Now
2019	"The Bullingdon Boys"	— (Note: "The Bullingdon Boys" didn't enter the Official Singles Chart, but it peaked at number 78 on the Official Singles Downloads Chart.)	—	—	—	—	—	—	—	—	—		Non-album single
2023	"C'est La Vie"	— (Note: "C'est La Vie" didn't enter the Official Singles Chart, but it peaked at number 94 on the Official Singles Downloads Chart.)	—	—	—	—	—	—	—	—	—		Theatre of the Absurd Presents C'est la Vie
2023	"Baby Burglar"	—	—	—	—	—	—	—	—	—	—		Theatre of the Absurd Presents C'est la Vie
2024	"Round We Go"	—	—	—	—	—	—	—	—	—	—		Theatre of the Absurd Presents C'est la Vie
2024	"No Reason"	—	—	—	—	—	—	—	—	—	—		Theatre of the Absurd Presents C'est la Vie
2024	"Hour of Need"	—	—	—	—	—	—	—	—	—	—		Theatre of the Absurd Presents C'est la Vie

== Videography ==
=== Video albums ===
- 1982: Complete Madness
- 1986: Utter Madness
- 1992: Divine Madness
- 1992: Madstock!
- 1998: Madstock! 4

=== Music videos ===
Year	Title	Album
1979	"The Prince" (single version & Top of the Pops performance clip)	One Step Beyond...
1979	"One Step Beyond"	One Step Beyond...
1979	"Bed and Breakfast Man"	One Step Beyond...
1979	"My Girl"	One Step Beyond...
1980	"Night Boat to Cairo"	One Step Beyond...
1980	"Baggy Trousers"	Absolutely
1980	"Embarrassment"	Absolutely
1981	"The Return of the Los Palmas 7"	Absolutely
1981	"Grey Day"	7
1981	"Shut Up"	7
1981	"It Must Be Love"	non-album
1982	"Cardiac Arrest"	7
1982	"House of Fun"	Complete Madness
1982	"Driving in My Car"	non-album
1982	"Our House"	The Rise & Fall
1983	"Tomorrow's (Just Another Day)"	The Rise & Fall
1983	"Wings of a Dove"	Keep Moving (US)
1983	"The Sun and the Rain"	Keep Moving (US)
1984	"Michael Caine"	Keep Moving (UK)
1984	"One Better Day"	Keep Moving (UK)
1985	"Yesterday's Men"	Mad Not Mad
1985	"Uncle Sam"	Mad Not Mad
1986	"Sweetest Girl"	Mad Not Mad
1986	"(Waiting For) The Ghost Train"	Utter Madness
1988	"I Pronounce You"	The Madness
1999	"Lovestruck"	Wonderful
1999	"Johnny the Horse"	Wonderful
2000	"Drip Fed Fred" (with Ian Dury)	Wonderful
2005	"Shame & Scandal" (2 versions)	The Dangermen Sessions Vol. 1
2007	"Sorry"	Non-album single
2008	"NW5"	The Liberty of Norton Folgate
2009	"Dust Devil"	The Liberty of Norton Folgate
2009	"Sugar and Spice"	The Liberty of Norton Folgate
2012	"Never Knew Your Name"	Oui Oui, Si Si, Ja Ja, Da Da
2016	"Mr Apples"	Can't Touch Us Now
2019	"The Bullingdon Boys"	Non-album single
2022	"The Prince" (album version)	One Step Beyond... (both with footage taken from the 1981 documentary movie Take It or Leave It)
2022	"Madness"	One Step Beyond... (both with footage taken from the 1981 documentary movie Take It or Leave It)
2023	"C'est la Vie"	Theatre of the Absurd Presents C'est la Vie
2023	"Baby Burglar"	Theatre of the Absurd Presents C'est la Vie
2023	"Round We Go"	Theatre of the Absurd Presents C'est la Vie

== See also ==
- Suggs#Discography
