= A Guided Tour of Madness =

Box set by Madness
- Released: 19 September 2011
- Recorded: 1979–2011
- Genre: Ska; pop; two-tone; new wave
- Length: 232:19
- Label: Salvo/Union Square
- Producer: Clive Langer; Alan Winstanley; Steve Dub; Segs; Charlie Andrew

Madness chronology
Ultimate Madness (2010)	A Guided Tour of Madness (2011)	Forever Young: The Ska Collection (2012)

A Guided Tour of Madness is a 3-CD/1-DVD anthology box set by the English band Madness, released in 2011 on Union Square Music's collector's label Salvo. It features 70 singles and album tracks (from 1979’s One Step Beyond... to 2009’s The Liberty of Norton Folgate) and an exclusive DVD of the band's comeback concert at the Madstock festival in August 1992. It also includes a booklet with interviews with the band, photos, the cartoon Nutty Comic (1981) and the Madness Map of Camden, the band's historic stomping ground. With the exception of "Sweetest Girl," "Sorry," and "The Harder They Come," every one of the band's 34 singles to date is represented.

The compilation is notable as containing the first (and, until Record Store Day 2022, only) official physical release of the track "Le Grand Pantalon", which closes the collection. This slower, waltz version of "Baggy Trousers", complete with accordion and double bass, as well as French lyrics, was originally created as part of Madness' participation in Kronenbourg Brewery's 'Slow the Pace' ad campaign. However, its popularity led to the band recording a full version, initially available only as a free download.

== Critical reception ==
Professional ratings
Review scores
Source	Rating
AllMusic	4/5 stars

AllMusic rated the box set 4 stars out of 5, saying, "A cut above most hastily assembled retrospectives, A Guided Tour of Madness is a cleverly selected affair which should satisfy anyone wishing to investigate more than their more ubiquitous commercial hits." The Super Deluxe Edition website wrote, "The care and attention in the included booklet, combined with the overall quality of the packaging, makes this an easy box set to recommend, even for the casual listener."

== Track listing ==
Disc 1
No.	Title	Writer(s)	Original release	Length
1.	"The Prince" (single version)	Lee Thompson	Non-album single, 1979	2:32
2.	"Madness" (single version)	Cecil Campbell	B-side of "The Prince"	2:25
3.	"Mistakes"	John Hasler, Mike Barson	B-side of "One Step Beyond"	2:40
4.	"Bed and Breakfast Man"	Barson	One Step Beyond..., 1979	2:33
5.	"One Step Beyond"	Campbell	One Step Beyond...	2:19
6.	"The Young and the Old"	Graham McPherson, Barson	Work Rest and Play EP, 1980	2:06
7.	"Deceives the Eye"	Mark Bedford, Chris Foreman	Work Rest and Play EP	2:01
8.	"My Girl"	Barson	One Step Beyond...	2:45
9.	"Believe Me"	Hasler, Barson	One Step Beyond...	2:29
10.	"In the Middle of the Night"	McPherson, Foreman	One Step Beyond...	3:02
11.	"Night Boat to Cairo"	McPherson, Barson	One Step Beyond...	3:32
12.	"On the Beat Pete"	Thompson, Madness	Absolutely, 1980	3:05
13.	"Not Home Today"	McPherson, Bedford	Absolutely	2:44
14.	"Baggy Trousers"	McPherson, Foreman	Absolutely	2:46
15.	"Disappear"	McPherson, Bedford	Absolutely	2:59
16.	"You Said"	McPherson, Barson	Absolutely	2:35
17.	"Embarrassment"	Thompson, Barson	Absolutely	3:11
18.	"Take It or Leave It"	Thompson, Barson	Absolutely	3:28
19.	"The Return of the Los Palmas 7"	Barson, Bedford, Daniel Woodgate	Absolutely	2:05
20.	"Grey Day"	Barson	7, 1981	3:40
21.	"Tomorrow's Dream"	Thompson, Barson	7	3:56
22.	"Mrs. Hutchinson"	Barson	7	2:17
23.	"Shut Up"	McPherson, Foreman	7	2:51
24.	"Sign of the Times"	McPherson, Barson	7	2:44
25.	"It Must Be Love"	Labi Siffre	Non-album single, 1981	3:18
26.	"In the City"	McPherson, Barson, Chas Smash, Foreman, Bill Crutchfield, Daisuke Inoue	B-side of "Cardiac Arrest", 1982	3:26
27.	"Cardiac Arrest"	Smash, Foreman	7	2:51
Total length:				77:51

Disc 2
No.	Title	Writer(s)	Original release	Length
1.	"House of Fun" (fairground ending version)	Thompson, Barson	Non-album single, 1982	2:49
2.	"Don't Look Back"	Foreman	B-side of "House of Fun"	4:52
3.	"Primrose Hill"	McPherson, Foreman	The Rise & Fall, 1982	3:23
4.	"Driving in My Car"	Barson	Non-album single, 1982	3:17
5.	"Calling Cards"	Thompson, Foreman	The Rise & Fall	2:20
6.	"Blue Skinned Beast"	Thompson	The Rise & Fall	3:23
7.	"Our House"	Cathal Smyth, Foreman	The Rise & Fall	3:23
8.	"Madness (Is All in the Mind)"	Foreman	The Rise & Fall	2:53
9.	"Tomorrow's (Just Another Day)"	Smyth, Barson	The Rise & Fall	3:11
10.	"Wings of a Dove"	Smyth, McPherson	Non-album single, 1983	3:01
11.	"March of the Gherkins"	Thompson, Barson	Keep Moving, 1984	3:30
12.	"Keep Moving"	Smyth, Foreman, McPherson	Keep Moving	3:32
13.	"The Sun and the Rain"	Barson	Non-album single, 1983	3:30
14.	"Samantha"	Thompson, Barson	Keep Moving	3:14
15.	"Prospects"	Smyth, McPherson	Keep Moving	4:14
16.	"One Better Day"	McPherson, Bedford	Keep Moving	4:06
17.	"Michael Caine"	Smyth, Woodgate	Keep Moving	3:30
18.	"Victoria Gardens" (remix)	Smyth, Barson	Keep Moving	4:32
19.	"Yesterday's Men"	McPherson, Foreman	Mad Not Mad, 1985	4:09
20.	"All I Knew"	McPherson	B-side of "Yesterday's Men"	3:08
21.	"I'll Compete"	Thompson, Woodgate	Mad Not Mad	3:21
22.	"Uncle Sam"	Thompson, Foreman	Mad Not Mad	4:16
Total length:				76:35

Disc 3
No.	Title	Writer(s)	Original release	Length
1.	"(Waiting For) The Ghost Train"	McPherson	Non-album single, 1986	3:46
2.	"The Wizard"	Smyth	Wonderful, 1999	3:28
3.	"The Communicator"	McPherson, Smyth	Wonderful	3:20
4.	"Lovestruck"	Thompson, Barson	Wonderful	3:50
5.	"Elysium"	Thompson, Woodgate	Wonderful	3:53
6.	"Drip Fed Fred" (feat. Ian Dury)	Thompson, Barson	Wonderful	4:31
7.	"Saturday Night, Sunday Morning"	McPherson	Wonderful	4:15
8.	"Johnny the Horse"	Smyth	Wonderful	3:20
9.	"Sarah's Song"	Thompson, Barson	Our House: The Original Songs, 2002	3:47
10.	"Girl Why Don't You?"	Campbell	The Dangermen Sessions Vol. 1, 2005	3:05
11.	"Lola"	Ray Davies	The Dangermen Sessions Vol. 1	3:22
12.	"I Chase the Devil a.k.a. Ironshirt"	Max Romeo, Lee Perry	The Dangermen Sessions Vol. 1	3:21
13.	"Shame & Scandal"	Lord Melody, Lancelot Pinard	The Dangermen Sessions Vol. 1	2:53
14.	"You Keep Me Hanging On"	Brian Holland, Lamont Dozier, Eddie Holland	The Dangermen Sessions Vol. 1	3:10
15.	"NW5"	Thompson, Barson	The Liberty of Norton Folgate, 2009	4:15
16.	"Forever Young"	McPherson	The Liberty of Norton Folgate	4:36
17.	"That Close"	McPherson, Foreman	The Liberty of Norton Folgate	4:10
18.	"Dust Devil"	Thompson, Woodgate	The Liberty of Norton Folgate	3:45
19.	"On the Town" (feat. Rhoda Dakar)	Woodgate, Barson	The Liberty of Norton Folgate	4:33
20.	"Sugar and Spice" (single version)	Barson	The Liberty of Norton Folgate	2:52
21.	"Le Grand Pantalon"	McPherson, Foreman	Non-album download single, 2011	4:33
Total length:				77:53

Disc 4: Madstock DVD - recorded at Finsbury Park 8 August 1992
No.	Title	Writer(s)	Length
1.	"One Step Beyond" (live)	Campbell	2:47
2.	"The Prince" (live)	Thompson	3:06
3.	"Embarrassment" (live)	Thompson, Barson	3:13
4.	"My Girl" (live)	Barson	3:01
5.	"The Sun and the Rain" (live)	Barson	4:06
6.	"Land of Hope and Glory" (live)	Thompson	3:49
7.	"Grey Day" (live)	Barson	5:27
8.	"Razor Blade Alley" (live)	Thompson	3:01
9.	"It Must Be Love" (live)	Siffre	3:50
10.	"Tomorrow's (Just Another Day)" (live)	Smyth, Barson	3:24
11.	"Take It or Leave It" (live)	Thompson, Barson	4:03
12.	"Shut Up" (live)	McPherson, Foreman	4:01
13.	"Driving in My Car" (live)	Barson	3:48
14.	"Bed and Breakfast Man" (live)	Barson	3:07
15.	"Close Escape" (live)	Thompson, Foreman	4:56
16.	"Wings of a Dove" (live)	McPherson, Smyth	5:21
17.	"Our House" (live)	Smyth, Foreman	3:47
18.	"Night Boat to Cairo" (live)	McPherson, Barson	3:32
19.	"Madness" (live)	Campbell	4:23
20.	"Swan Lake" (live)	Pyotr Ilyich Tchaikovsky; arranged by Barson	2:36
21.	"House of Fun" (live)	Thompson, Barson	3:11
22.	"Rockin' in A♭" (live)	Willy Wurlitzer	2:53
23.	"Baggy Trousers" (live)	McPherson, Foreman	2:54
24.	"The Harder They Come" (live)	Jimmy Cliff	8:16
Total length:			102:27

== Certifications and sales ==
Region	Certification	Certified units/sales
United Kingdom (BPI)	Gold	100,000^{‡}
^{‡} Sales+streaming figures based on certification alone.

== Personnel ==
See individual albums for full personnel credits.

Madness

- Graham "Suggs" McPherson – vocals
- Cathal Smyth – vocals, trumpet
- Mike Barson - piano, keyboards
- Chris Foreman – guitar
- Mark Bedford – bass
- Lee Thompson – saxophone, vocals
- Daniel Woodgate – drums

Additional musicians on bonus track "Le Grand Pantalon"

- Rachael Lander – strings
- Kirsty Mangan – strings
- Natalie Holt – strings
- Stephanie Benedetti – strings
- Louis Vause – accordion
- Lester Allen – banjo

Technical

- Clive Langer – producer (disc 1: 1-27 / disc 2: 1-22 / disc 3: 1-9, 15-21)
- Alan Winstanley – producer (disc 1: 3-27 / disc 2: 1-22 / disc 3: 1-9, 15-20), DVD sound mix
- Steve Dub – producer (disc 3: 10-14)
- John "Segs" Jennings – producer (disc 3: 10-14)
- Charlie Andrew – producer (disc 3: 21)
- Tim Turan – mastering
- Mark Brennan – compilation
- Daryl Smith – compilation
- Martin "Cally" Callomon – box theme, art direction, design
- Eric Watson – front cover photograph
- Clare Muller – black and white band photographs
- Paul Rider – band photographs
- Gavin Martin – booklet interviews

DVD

- Meedja – DVD authoring
- Juliet De Valero-Wills – executive producer
- Malcolm Gerrie – executive producer
- Dione Orram – producer
- Rocky Oldham – producer
- Gavin Taylor – director
