= Forever Young: The Ska Collection =

Compilation album by Madness
- Released: 2 April 2012
- Recorded: 1979–2009
- Genres: Ska; two-tone; pop
- Length: 78:28
- Label: Salvo/Union Square
- Producers: Clive Langer; Alan Winstanley; Madness

Madness chronology
A Guided Tour of Madness (2011)	Forever Young: The Ska Collection (2012)	Oui Oui Si Si Ja Ja Da Da (2012)

Forever Young: The Ska Collection is a compilation album by the English band Madness, released in 2012 by Salvo/Union Square Music as part of their re-issues of the Madness back catalogue. The album consists of a selection of the band's ska sounding songs, including singles, b-sides and album tracks. In addition to the classic Madness tracks, the album contains two previously unreleased covers: Jimmy Cliff's "Vietnam" and Edvard Grieg's "In the Hall of the Mountain King". Both of these bonus tracks were originally recorded for the 2005 Madness album The Dangermen Sessions Vol. 1. The album includes a fold-out poster booklet with liner notes by Record Collector's Ian McCann, including new interviews with guitarist Chris Foreman and saxophonist Lee Thompson. Foreman said of the album: "It was our take on ska, and the songs on this album have ska as their basis. Not all are full-on; I wanted it to be called The Ska and Reggae Collection, but The Ska Collection it is."

== Critical reception ==
Professional ratings
Review scores
Source	Rating
AllMusic	3.5/5 stars
Record Collector	4/5 stars

AllMusic wrote, "While they were never strictly a ska band, Madness had more than their share of skanky moments, many of which can be found on this 24-track compilation." AllMusic felt that while longtime fans will appreciate the collection's "quirky" set list, listeners looking for "something with "Our House" on it" would be better off with a greatest hits album.

== Track listing ==
No.	Title	Writer(s)	Original release	Length
1.	"One Step Beyond"	Cecil Campbell	One Step Beyond..., 1979	2:19
2.	"Forever Young"	Graham McPherson	The Liberty of Norton Folgate, 2009	4:35
3.	"My Girl"	Mike Barson	One Step Beyond...	2:41
4.	"Baggy Trousers"	McPherson, Chris Foreman	Absolutely, 1980	2:28
5.	"House of Fun"	Lee Thompson, Barson	Complete Madness, 1982	2:47
6.	"Grey Day"	Barson	7, 1981	3:38
7.	"Tarzan's Nuts"	Chas Smash, Barson	One Step Beyond...	2:25
8.	"Don't Quote Me on That"	Barson, Mark Bedford, Foreman, McPherson, Cathal Smyth, Thompson, Daniel Woodgate (Note: Credited on the Work Rest and Play EP to: Peter Tosh, Chas Smash. Guitarist Chris Foreman said in 2010, "There was some confusion over the writer of the tune we had been "inspired" by [ripped off] for the music and someone thought Peter Tosh had written the original version, which was a long way from the truth, he had nothing to do with it.")	Work Rest and Play EP, 1980	4:33
9.	"Take It or Leave It"	Thompson, Barson	Absolutely	3:19
10.	"Victoria Gardens"	Smyth, Barson	Keep Moving, 1984	4:33
11.	"The Prince"	Thompson	One Step Beyond...	3:19
12.	"Day on the Town"	McPherson, Foreman	7	3:22
13.	"Dust Devil"	Thompson, Woodgate	The Liberty of Norton Folgate	3:44
14.	"In the Rain"	McPherson, Madness	Absolutely	2:46
15.	"Not Home Today"	McPherson, Bedford	Absolutely	2:44
16.	"Prospects"	Smyth, McPherson	Keep Moving	4:13
17.	"In the City'"	McPherson, Barson, Smyth, Foreman, Bill Crutchfield, Daisuke Inoue	B-side of "Cardiac Arrest" single, 1982	2:58
18.	"Madness"	Campbell	One Step Beyond...	2:38
19.	"Mistakes"	John Hasler, Barson	B-side of "One Step Beyond" single	2:54
20.	"The Communicator"	McPherson, Smyth	Wonderful, 1999	3:21
21.	"Swan Lake"	Pyotr Ilyich Tchaikovsky; arranged by Barson	One Step Beyond...	3:28
22.	"Night Boat to Cairo"	McPherson, Barson	One Step Beyond...	3:25
23.	"Vietnam"	Jimmy Cliff	Previously unreleased	4:15
24.	"In the Hall of the Mountain King"	Edvard Grieg; arranged by Madness	Previously unreleased	2:39
Total length:				78:28

== Charts ==
Chart (2009)	Peak position
UK Albums (Official Charts)	99

== Personnel ==
See individual albums for full personnel credits.

Madness

- Graham "Suggs" McPherson – vocals
- Cathal Smyth – vocals, trumpet
- Mike Barson – piano, keyboards
- Chris Foreman – guitar
- Mark Bedford – bass
- Lee Thompson – saxophone
- Daniel Woodgate – drums

Technical

- Clive Langer – producer (1-22)
- Alan Winstanley – producer (1-22)
- Madness – producer (23, 24)
- Kerstin Rodgers – cover photo
- Ian McCann – liner notes
