= Ultimate Madness =

Greatest hits album by Madness
- Released: 7 June 2010
- Recorded: 1979–2008
- Genre: Ska; pop
- Label: Union Square
- Producer: Clive Langer and Alan Winstanley

Madness chronology
Total Madness (2009)	Ultimate Madness (2010)	A Guided Tour of Madness (2011)

Ultimate Madness is a compilation album by the band Madness, consisting of 21 of their singles. It reached 27 in the UK charts and was an exclusive Tesco release.

== Track listing ==
1. "The Prince" - 2:29
2. "One Step Beyond" - 2:20
3. "My Girl" - 2:44
4. "Night Boat to Cairo" - 3:30
5. "Baggy Trousers" - 2:46
6. "Embarrassment" - 3:10
7. "The Return of the Los Palmas 7" - 2:33
8. "Grey Day" - 3:39
9. "Shut Up" - 2:51
10. "It Must Be Love" - 3:17
11. "Cardiac Arrest" - 2:56
12. "House of Fun" - 2:48
13. "Driving in My Car" - 3:17
14. "Our House" - 3:22
15. "Tomorrow's Just Another Day" - 3:10
16. "Wings of a Dove" - 3:01
17. "The Sun and the Rain" - 3:30
18. "Michael Caine" - 3:38
19. "NW5"
20. "Dust Devil"
21. "Forever Young"

== Charts ==
Chart (2010)	Peak position
Scottish Albums (OCC)	23
UK Albums (OCC)	27
UK Independent Albums (OCC)	3

== Certifications and sales ==
Region	Certification	Certified units/sales
United Kingdom (BPI)	Silver	60,000^{*}
^{*} Sales figures based on certification alone.
