= Can't Touch Us Now =

Studio album by Madness
- Released: 28 October 2016
- Recorded: 2016
- Studios: Toe Rag Studios, London; Iguana Studio, London; Liquidator Studios, London (demos)
- Genres: Ska; pop; reggae
- Length: 58:59
- Label: Lucky 7
- Producers: Clive Langer; Liam Watson; Charlie Andrew; Madness

Madness chronology
Oui Oui, Si Si, Ja Ja, Da Da (2012)	Can't Touch Us Now (2016)	Theatre of the Absurd Presents C'est la Vie (2023)

Singles from Can't Touch Us Now
- 1. "Mr. Apples" Released: 7 September 2016; 2. "Herbert" Released: 14 October 2016; 3. "Can't Touch Us Now" Released: 16 December 2016; 4. "Another Version of Me" Released: 24 February 2017; 5. "(Don’t Let Them Catch You) Crying" Released: 6 July 2017

Can't Touch Us Now is the eleventh studio album by the British band Madness, released on their Lucky 7 Records label through Universal Music Catalogue (UMC) on 28 October 2016. The album marked the return of founder member Mark Bedford but the departure of Cathal Smyth (Chas Smash).

The album received supportive reviews from a variety of publications. For example, critic Jon Dennis of The Guardian labelled the group "legends" and described them as being "as entertaining as ever" in the release. The song "Pam the Hawk" was highlighted in particular for its lyrical themes.

A special collector's edition box set version of Can't Touch Us Now was released simultaneously with the album under the title "The Greatest Show on Earth". This version was packaged to resemble a board game complete with a playable card game. It also contained a second disc consisting of demos, some which dated back to the early 1990s, such as "Soul Denying", "I Believe", and "Whistle In the Dark".

== Singles ==
Professional ratings
Aggregate scores
Source	Rating
Metacritic	75/100
Review scores
Source	Rating
AllMusic	3.5/5 stars
Financial Times	3/5 stars
The Guardian	4/5 stars
The Independent	3/5 stars

The first single from the album, "Mr. Apples", was released in September 2016 and A-listed on BBC Radio 2. For the first time since Sugar And Spice in 2009 a scripted video was released. The song "Herbert" was released as a teaser on 14 October 2016, two weeks prior to the album. It was accompanied by an animated lyric video in the style of the album's artwork. On Friday 18 November, at the start of the 2016 "House of Fun Weekender" at Butlin's, the band announced title track "Can't Touch Us Now" as the second single from the album, accompanied by a brand new video which contained a performance by the band and footage from the album's ad.

== Track listing ==
No.	Title	Writer(s)	Length
1.	"Can't Touch Us Now"	Chris Foreman, Lee Thompson	4:13
2.	"Good Times"	Daniel Woodgate, Nick Woodgate	2:53
3.	"Mr. Apples"	Graham McPherson	3:38
4.	"I Believe"	Mike Barson, Thompson	3:44
5.	"Grandslam"	Foreman, McPherson	2:35
6.	"Blackbird"	Foreman, McPherson	4:03
7.	"You Are My Everything"	Barson	4:08
8.	"Another Version of Me"	D. Woodgate, N. Woodgate	2:40
9.	"Mumbo Jumbo"	Thompson, Keith Finch	3:23
10.	"Herbert"	Barson, McPherson	3:57
11.	"Don't Leave the Past Behind You"	D. Woodgate, N. Woodgate	2:45
12.	"(Don't Let Them) Catch You Crying"	Foreman, Thompson	4:10
13.	"Pam the Hawk"	Barson, McPherson	4:37
14.	"Given the Opportunity"	Foreman, Thompson	3:31
15.	"Soul Denying"	Barson, Thompson	5:13
16.	"Whistle in the Dark"	Barson, Thompson	3:29
Total length:			58:59

=== The Greatest Show on Earth (Can't Touch Us Now special edition) ===
Disc 1
- The first disc contains the sixteen tracks from the original album version.

Disc 2
No.	Title	Writer(s)	Length
1.	"Mr. Apples" (alternate version)	McPherson	3:30
2.	"Grandslam" (instrumental demo)	Foreman, McPherson	2:04
3.	"Mumbo Jumbo" (demo)	Thompson, Finch	3:10
4.	"Good Times" (demo)	D. Woodgate, N. Woodgate	3:04
5.	"You Are My Everything" (demo)	Barson	4:45
6.	"Another Version of Me" (demo)	D. Woodgate, N. Woodgate	3:58
7.	"Blackbird" (instrumental demo)	Foreman, McPherson	3:04
8.	"Herbert" (demo)	Barson, McPherson	3:50
9.	"I Believe" (demo)	Barson, Thompson	3:33
10.	"Don't Let Them (Catch You Crying)" (demo)	Foreman, Thompson	3:27
11.	"Pam the Hawk" (demo)	Barson, McPherson	3:51
12.	"Soul Denying" (demo)	Barson, Thompson	5:33
13.	"Whistle in the Dark" (demo)	Barson, Thompson	3:11
14.	"Last Rag and Bone Man" (demo)	Barson, McPherson	4:15

== Personnel ==
Credits are adapted from the album's liner notes.

Madness

- Graham "Suggs" McPherson – lead and backing vocals, tambourine, brass arrangements
- Mike Barson – upright piano, organ, harpsichord, electric piano, glockenspiel, celesta, Mellotron, guitar, saw, backing vocals, string and brass arrangements
- Chris Foreman – guitar, Mellotron, Roland Juno-60, brass arrangements
- Mark Bedford – bass, double bass, tuba
- Lee Thompson – saxophone, lead vocals on track 9, backing vocals, Jew's harp, brass arrangements
- Daniel Woodgate – drums, programming, brass arrangements

Additional personnel

- Mike Kearsey – trombone, brass arrangements
- Steve Hamilton – baritone saxophone, brass arrangements
- Joe Auckland – trumpet, banjo, brass arrangements
- Mez Clough – percussion
- Ade Omotayo – backing vocals
- Spider J. – backing vocals
- London Community Gospel Choir – backing vocals
- Elise De Villaine – backing vocals
- Jo Archard – violin
- Kirsty Mangan – violin, string arrangements
- Amy May – viola
- Sarah Chapman – viola
- Rachael Lander – cello
- Clive Langer – production
- Liam Watson – production
- Charlie Andrew – production, mixing, electric piano
- Madness – production, string arrangements
- Katie Earl – assistant mixing engineer
- Paul Agar – design, layout
- Perou – photography

The Greatest Show on Earth - disc 2

- Madness – vocals (1)
- Ade Omotayo – backing vocals (1)
- Lee Thompson – vocals (3, 9, 10, 12, 13), production (3, 9, 13), mixing (3, 9, 13)
- Nick Woodgate – vocals (4, 6)
- Mike Barson – vocals (5), all instruments (9), production (5, 8, 9, 11-14), mixing (5, 8, 11-14)
- Mark Bedford – bass (6)
- Graham "Suggs" McPherson – vocals (8, 11, 14)
- Clive Langer – production, mixing (1)
- Liam Watson – production, mixing (1)
- Chris Foreman – production, mixing (2, 7, 10)
- Keith Finch – production (3)
- Daniel Woodgate – production, mixing (4, 6)

== Charts ==
=== Weekly charts ===
Chart (2016)	Peak position
Belgian Albums (Ultratop Flanders)	141
Belgian Albums (Ultratop Wallonia)	78
Irish Albums (IRMA)	25
Scottish Albums (Official Charts)	6
UK Albums (Official Charts)	5

=== Year-end charts ===
Chart (2016)	Position
UK Albums (OCC)	99

== Certifications and sales ==
Region	Certification	Certified units/sales
United Kingdom (BPI)	Silver	60,000^{‡}
^{‡} Sales+streaming figures based on certification alone.
