= Forever Young =

Forever Young may refer to:

== Film, television and radio ==
- Forever Young, a 1981 American documentary directed by Robin Lehman
- Forever Young (1983 film), a British television film directed by David Drury
- Forever Young (1992 film), an American film directed by Steve Miner
- Forever Young (2014 film), a Chinese film directed by Lu Gengxu
- Forever Young (2015 film), a Chinese film directed by He Jiong
- Forever Young (2016 film), an Italian film directed by Fausto Brizzi
- Forever Young (2018 film), a Chinese film directed by Li Fangfang
- Forever Young (2022 film), a French film directed by Valeria Bruni Tedeschi
- Forever Young (2023 film), a British film directed by Henk Pretorious
- Forever Young (American TV series), a 2013 American reality TV series
- Forever Young (2014 TV series), a 2014–2017 Vietnamese and South Korean drama TV series
- Forever Young (2024 TV series), a 2024 Philippine drama TV series
- Forever Young, a South African TV program on Vuzu
- "Forever Young" (Grey's Anatomy), an episode of Grey's Anatomy
- Pepper Young's Family, previously Forever Young, a 1932–1959 American radio program

== Music ==
- Alphaville (band), originally Forever Young, a German synth-pop band

=== Albums ===
- Forever Young (Alphaville album) or the title song (see below), 1984
- Forever Young (Jacob Young album), 2014
- Forever Young (James Young album), 1988
- Forever Young (Kaysha album), 2009
- Forever Young (Kitty Wells album), 1974
- Forever Young (EP), by Sam Concepcion, 2011
- Forever Young: The Ska Collection or the title song (see below), by Madness, 2012

=== Songs ===
- "Forever Young" (Alphaville song), 1984; covered by Interactive (1994), Youth Group (2006), David Guetta and Ava Max (2024), and others
- "Forever Young" (Blackpink song), 2018
- "Forever Young" (Bob Dylan song), 1974; covered by Joan Baez (1974), Louisa Johnson (2015), and others
- "Forever Young" (Madness song), 2010
- "Forever Young" (Rod Stewart song), 1988
- "Forever Young", by Bananarama from Masquerade, 2022
- "Forever Young", by Carol Parks from the film Care Bears Movie II: A New Generation, 1986
- "Forever Young", by Felix Jaehn, featuring Lxandra, from I, 2018
- "Forever Young", by Lil Yachty from Teenage Emotions, 2017
- "Forever Young", by Sparks from Introducing Sparks, 1977
- "Forever Young", by Tyketto, 1991
- "Forever Young", from Dracula, the Musical

== Sports ==
- Forever Young (horse) (foaled 2021), a Japanese thoroughbred racehorse

== See also ==
- Forever Malcolm Young, an album by Frenzal Rhomb, or the title song, 2006
- Young Forever (disambiguation)
- Eternal youth
- Immortality
