= Theatre of the Absurd Presents C'est la Vie =

Studio album by Madness
- Released: 17 November 2023
- Recorded: 2023
- Genre: 2-tone; baroque pop
- Length: 56:46 (standard edition); 101:45 (enhanced edition)
- Label: BMG
- Producer: Matt Glasbey; Clive Langer; Alan Winstanley

Madness chronology
Can't Touch Us Now (2016)	Theatre of the Absurd Presents C'est la Vie (2023)

Singles from Theatre of the Absurd Presents C'est la Vie
- 1. "C'est la Vie (radio release)" Released: 28 September 2023; 2. "Baby Burglar" Released: 27 October 2023; 3. "Round We Go (radio release)" Released: 16 February 2024; 4. "No Reason" Released: 25 April 2024; 5. "Hour Of Need (radio release)" Released: 17 May 2024

Theatre of the Absurd Presents C'est la Vie is the twelfth studio album by British band Madness. It was released on 17 November 2023 through BMG Rights Management.

The album was Madness's first studio release in seven years, following Can't Touch Us Now (2016). It became their first ever number-one studio album in the UK.

== Background ==
Madness recorded the album in Cricklewood in early 2023. Matt Glasbey is credited with producing and mixing all tracks, except "In My Street", which was produced by the long-time Madness production team of Clive Langer and Alan Winstanley. The creation of the record was spurred by the principle "Let Madness be Madness". In a statement, Madness described the recording process as "the perfect antidote to the chaos of the past few years" and referred to their current form as "properly in the zone". The result was understood as "their most harmonious recording experience to date". The band announced the album on 27 September 2023 and premiered the lead single "C'est la Vie" on The Radio 2 Breakfast Show. Accompanying the announcement, the band let British actress Helen Mirren give a "dramatic reading" of some of the lyrics.

It became Madness' first ever number one studio album in the UK. The album also made the album charts in Ireland, Germany and The Netherlands.

On 11 December a full version of the "C'est La Vie" video was released. Follow by "Baby Burglar" on 23 January 2024.

In February it was announced that "Round We Go" would be released as the official new single. A full video was released on 6 February, followed by a single edit on 16 February. On 23 February the song was added to BBC Radio 2's New Music Playlist.

In April 2024 the enhanced version of Theatre Of The Absurd Presents C'est La Vie was announced, featuring 5 new songs and 7 unreleased live songs from the December tour, including the band's version of The Specials' "Friday Night Saturday Morning". "No Reason" - written by Suggs - was made available directly.

On 17 May, just before the band went on their first US tour in 12 years, "Hour Of Need" was released as a single and went straight to the BBC Radio 2 playlist. The release was accompanied by the announcement of the 'Hour Of Need' Award, for which fans could honour an unsung hero in their lives.

== Critical reception ==
Professional ratings
Aggregate scores
Source	Rating
Metacritic	81/100
Review scores
Source	Rating
Classic Rock	4/5 stars
Mojo	4/5 stars
The Observer	3/5 stars
Uncut	4/5 stars

Theatre of the Absurd Presents C'est la Vie received a score of 81 out of 100 on review aggregator Metacritic based on four critics' reviews, indicating "universal acclaim". Mojo's Ian Harrison called it "floridly titled, slow burning" and wrote that "on record alone, there's plenty to intrigue. [...] Madness have made an album that is among their absolute best." Phil Mongredien of The Observer described the album as "a fairly sedate mix of uplift and melancholy" and felt that "it doesn't quite match the standard of late-career high point The Liberty of Norton Folgate (2009), but the album is not without its moments". Classic Rock wrote that "the roaring 20s has finally arrived", and Peter Watts of Uncut remarked that while "the songs are written from multiple perspectives, they share a common mood – essentially life and its general absurdity". Watts additionally found that "the most distinctive Madness traits are all present" and the "biggest spiritual influence is the Kinks, another band adept at exploring London's darker undercurrents".

== Track listing ==
Theatre of the Absurd Presents C'est la Vie track listing
No.	Title	Writer(s)	Arranger(s)	Length
1.	"Prologue: "Mr Beckett Sir...""			0:11
2.	"Theatre of the Absurd"	Graham McPherson	Michael Barson; Tina Jacobs-Lim; Mike Kearsey	4:13
3.	"If I Go Mad"	McPherson	Kearsey	4:36
4.	"Baby Burglar"	Barson; Lee Thompson	Barson; Kearsey	4:05
5.	"Act One: "Surrounded on All Sides..""			0:10
6.	"C'est la Vie"	Barson	Barson; Kearsey	3:10
7.	"What on Earth Is It (You Take Me For?)"	Christopher Foreman; Thompson		3:07
8.	"Hour of Need"	Barson	Barson; Jacobs-Lim; Kearsey	4:07
9.	"Act Two "The Damsel in Distress..""			0:12
10.	"Round We Go"	Daniel Woodgate	Kearsey	4:18
11.	"Act Three: "The Situation Deteriorates..""			0:20
12.	"Lockdown and Frack Off"	Foreman	Foreman; Kearsey	3:12
13.	"Beginners 101"	Barson	Barson; Will Gardner	4:21
14.	"Is There Anybody Out There?"	Foreman; Thompson	Foreman; Kearsey	3:22
15.	"The Law According to Dr. Kippah"	Barson; Thompson	Barson	5:35
16.	"Epilogue: "And So Ladies and Gentlemen..""			0:17
17.	"Run for Your Life"	Foreman	Kearsey	4:00
18.	"Set Me Free (Let Me Be)"	Foreman		3:39
19.	"In My Street"	McPherson	David Arnold; Nicholas Dodd	3:38
20.	"Fin.: "Ladies and Gentlemen..""			0:13
Total length:				56:46

Enhanced edition – bonus tracks
No.	Title	Written by	Length
21.	"I'd Do Anything (If I Could)"	Foreman	3:53
22.	"No Reason"	McPherson	3:09
23.	"Hello Sun"	Woodgate	3:21
24.	"Long Goodbye"	Woodgate	3:23
25.	"Culture Vulture"	Barson; Thompson	3:36
26.	"Theatre of the Absurd" (live)	McPherson	3:49
27.	"C'est la Vie" (live)	Barson	3:12
28.	"Hour of Need" (live)	Barson	4:19
29.	"Round We Go" (live)	Woodgate	4:31
30.	"Run for Your Life" (live)	Foreman	4:08
31.	"In My Street" (live)	McPherson	3:51
32.	"Friday Night, Saturday Morning" (live)	Terry Hall	3:48
Total length:			44:59

== Personnel ==
Madness

- Mike Barson – keyboards (tracks 1, 5–7, 9, 11, 12, 14–16, 20), piano (2–4, 6, 7, 10, 12, 13, 15, 17, 19), programming (2–4, 6, 8, 13, 15), percussion (2), organ (3, 7, 10, 12–14, 19), marimba (3), electric piano (4, 6), Vox organ (4, 6, 8), tubular bells (6), bells (13), clavinet (17)
- Mark Bedford – bass guitar (2–4, 6–8, 10, 12, 13, 15, 17–19), double bass (2, 4, 14)
- Chris Foreman – guitar (2–4, 6–8, 10, 12, 13–15, 17–19) programming (7, 12, 14, 17), brass arrangement (17)
- Suggs – lead vocals (2–4, 6–8, 10, 12, 13–15, 17–19), backing vocals (2–4, 6–8, 10, 12, 13, 18, 19); percussion (6, 8, 14)
- Lee Thompson – tenor saxophone (2–4, 6–8, 10, 12–15, 17, 19), spoken word vocals (2), backing vocals (3, 4, 7, 19), lead vocals (7, 15), percussion (15), brass arrangement (18)
- Dan Woodgate – drums (2–4, 6–8, 10, 12–15, 17–19), programming (10)

Additional musicians

- Martin Freeman – spoken word vocals (1, 5, 9, 11, 16, 20)
- Mez Clough – backing vocals (2–4, 10, 12–14, 17, 19), percussion (2–4, 6–8, 10, 12–15, 19)
- Steve Hamilton – baritone saxophone (2–4, 6–8, 10, 12, 14, 17, 19)
- Richard Phillips – cello (2, 8)
- Matt Glasbey – programming (2–4, 7, 8, 10, 12–15, 17), synthesizer (3, 10, 14, 15), percussion (15)
- Ruth Elder – string arrangement, violin (2, 8)
- Mike Kearsey – trombone (2–4, 7, 8, 10, 12, 14, 17, 19)
- Joe Auckland – trumpet (2–4, 7, 8, 10, 12, 14, 17, 19)
- Sam Kennedy – viola (2, 8)
- Tina Jacobs-Lim – violin (2, 8)
- Spider J – backing vocals (3, 4, 6, 8, 13, 15, 17, 18)
- Darren Fordham – backing vocals (4, 15)
- Buster the Dog – vocals (4)
- G. V. Fairchild – backing vocals (10)
- Rachel Lander – cello (13)
- Will Gardner – conductor (13)
- Rachel Robson – viola (13)
- Dan Oates – violin (13)
- Kit Massey – violin (13)
- Matthew Ward – violin (13)
- Noel Watson – programming (17)
- Helen Downham – cello (19)
- Helen Fitzgerald – cello (19)
- Michael Nowland – cello (19)
- Nicholas Dodd – conductor (19)
- Alexis Barbera – double bass (19)
- Jonny Gee – double bass (19)
- Antonia Finch – viola (19)
- Bruce Wilson – viola (19)
- Helen Goatley – viola (19)
- Sarah Chapman – viola (19)
- Alison Gordon – violin (19)
- Caroline Bodimead – violin (19)
- Daniel Peev – violin (19)
- Hannah Paterson – violin (19)
- Kate Scrivens – violin (19)
- Katrina McWilliams – violin (19)
- Mathias Svenson – violin (19)
- Richard Smith – violin (19)
- Stelios Chatziiosifidis – violin (19)

Technical

- Matt Glasbey – production (1–18, 20), engineering (2–4, 6–8, 10, 12–15, 17–19), additional production (19)
- Alan Winstanley – production (19)
- Clive Langer – production (19)
- Dick Beetham – engineering
- Andy Coules – engineering (1–6, 8, 11, 20)
- Ada Binaj – engineering (13)

== Charts ==
Chart performance for Theatre of the Absurd Presents C'est la Vie
Chart (2023)	Peak position
Belgian Albums (Ultratop Flanders)	172
Belgian Albums (Ultratop Wallonia)	151
Dutch Albums (Album Top 100)	88
German Albums (Offizielle Top 100)	40
Irish Albums (IRMA)	73
Scottish Albums (OCC)	1
UK Albums (OCC)	1
UK Independent Albums (OCC)	1
