= Heda =

Heda may be:

== Places ==
- Heda, Shizuoka, Japan

== People ==
- Antoni Heda (1916–2008), Polish military commander
- Willem Claeszoon Heda (1594–1680), Dutch painter of still lives
- Heda Margolius Kovály, Czech author

== Other uses ==
- Heda (schooner), a Russi-Japanese ship
- Heda, an honorific for the Commander of the 12 clans (e.g., Lexa, her predecessors, and her successors) in the CW series The 100; in season 3, Clarke is widely referred to as "Wanheda" (Commander of Death)
- Harmonically Enhanced Digital Audio (HEDA)
