= Sorry (Madness song) =

2007 single by Madness

- The sleeve is printed as if it was a very old second hand release, it has fake tear and wear, a Music and Goods Exchange price tag and moist stains.

Single by Madness
- Released: 5 March 2007
- Recorded: 2006
- Genre: Ska; pop
- Length: 3:02 (Radio edit); 3:36 (featuring Sway & Baby Blue); 2:32 (Original)
- Label: Lucky 7
- Songwriter: Malone/Liken/Madness
- Producer: Clive Langer/ Alan Winstanley/ Liken

Madness singles chronology
"Girl Why Don't You" (2005)	"Sorry" (2007)	"NW5" (2008)

"Sorry" is a single by the English ska band Madness, released in March 2007 as a stand-alone single, not included on any album. Unusually for Madness, it is a song that was written for them by outside writers—all previous Madness singles had been either original compositions by the band, or covers of previously existing tunes. "Sorry" was given to them by their new management group to fill the gap between The Dangermen Sessions Vol. 1 (2005) and The Liberty of Norton Folgate (2009); Madness themselves worked on the song enough to gain a co-writer credit on the finished track.

In an attempt to gain more air play from a variety of radio stations, two different versions of the song were issued. One version featured just the band, while a second featured an interlude from UK rap artists Sway DaSafo and Baby Blue.

The band brought it out via their own label Lucky 7 Records, entering the UK chart at #23 on Sunday 11 March 2007, their highest UK chart single entry since "Lovestruck" in 1999. The single also went to #3 on the UK Indie Chart. At the time, guitarist Chris Foreman had left Madness, and does not feature on the single or the video. This is the only Madness track Foreman does not appear on.

== Track listing ==
7" vinyl single

Side one
No.	Title	Length
1.	"Sorry" (Featuring Sway & Baby Blue)

Side two
No.	Title	Length
1.	"Sorry"

CD single

No.	Title	Length
1.	"Sorry" (Radio Edit)	3:02
2.	"Sorry" (Featuring Sway & Baby Blue)	3:36
3.	"Sorry" (Original)	2:32
4.	"Sorry" (Live In Manchester 13.12.06)	2:35

== Chart performance ==
Chart (2007)	Peak position	Total weeks
UK Singles Chart	23	1
UK Indie Chart	3	4
