= Sugar and Spice (Madness song) =

Madness song

Single by Madness

from the album The Liberty of Norton Folgate
- Released: 3 August 2009
- Recorded: 2008
- Genre: Pop, ska
- Length: 2:57
- Label: Lucky 7 Records
- Songwriter(s): Mike Barson
- Producer(s): Clive Langer; Alan Winstanley

Madness singles chronology
"Dust Devil" (2009)	"Sugar and Spice" (2009)	"Forever Young" (2010)

"Sugar and Spice" is a single by the band Madness, released on 3 August 2009. It is the third single from the album The Liberty of Norton Folgate and is the first ever Madness single to be released only digitally.

The version of Sugar and Spice featured in the single release differs slightly from the version included in the album, as it has a different opening verse and words differ throughout the song.

The B-side included in the release is the demo version of Sugar and Spice featuring keyboard player Mike Barson on vocals; it also includes an extra verse. This is the second time a Madness release has featured Mike Barson on vocals after a demo version of My Girl was released on the 12-inch version of "The Return of the Los Palmas 7" in 1981.

The song was written by Mike Barson on the subject of his separation from his now ex-wife Sandra.

In addition, an extended remix of the track Africa by Ashley Beedle is also included.

== Track listing ==
1. "Sugar and Spice (Radio Edit)" (Barson) - 2:57
2. "Sugar and Spice (Demo Version)" (Barson) - 3:47
3. "Africa (Ashley Beedle's Going Home Edit)" (Barson) - 8:05

== Video ==
The video for "Sugar and Spice" featured the band, minus Chas Smash, playing the song in a traditional music hall venue. The video shows the band playing invisible instruments, performing magic tricks and acting out various scenes from the song against a digitalised background.

This marks a return to form for Madness videos, as the previous singles "NW5" and "Dust Devil" featured clips of live performances and actors respectively.
