= Rudy Mills =

Reggae musician

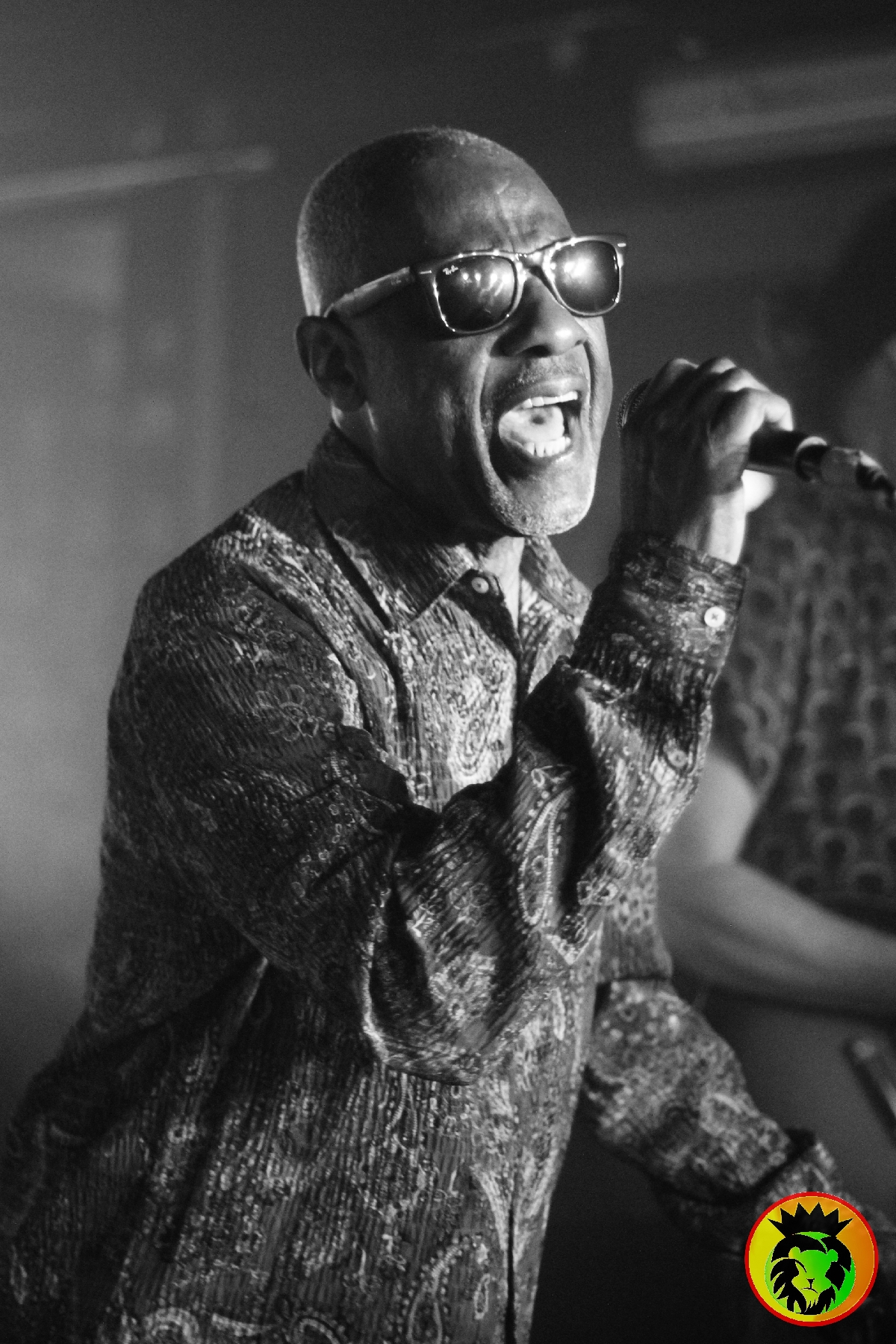
- Mills performing live at Le Molotov, Marseille, France in May 2022.

Background information
- Birth name: Rudolph Methaian Mills
- Genres: Reggae
- Occupation: Singer
- Labels: Island; Rhino; Trojan; Jamaican Gold; Heartbeat; BMG; Universal
- Formerly of: Progressions

Rudolph "Rudy" Methaian Mills is a reggae musician known for his releases during the rock steady era in the 1960s. He was discovered by producer Derrick Harriott who released his hit song "A Long Story". Versions of the song were later used by other artists including Bongo Herman & Bingy Bunny sampling it in an instrumental rendition.

Mills released singles with Island Records, and his music has been featured on over 20 compilations, including releases from Rhino Entertainment, Trojan Records, Jamaican Gold, Heartbeat, BMG and Universal Music TV.

Mills was in a band called Progressions.

Mills' song "John Jones" was a hit among the skinhead subculture in England. It was released on Trojan Records / B & C Records label Big Shot and was one of their hits. Mills song "A Place Called Happiness" was the B side. "John Jones" was also released on the Tighten Up Volume 2 compilation LP.

"John Jones" was used on the British comedy series Plebs and was released on its soundtrack.

In 2019, Mills released the single "Lonely".
