= Oui Oui, Si Si, Ja Ja, Da Da =

2012 studio album by Madness

Oui Oui Si Si Ja Ja Da Da

Studio album by Madness
- Released: 29 October 2012
- Recorded: 2011–2012
- Studios: Assault & Battery 2, London; Air Edel, London; Iguana Studio, London; Metropolis, London; The Premises Studios, London; Toe Rag Studios, London; The Yard, London; Brando's Paradise, San Gabriel; Additional studios (bonus tracks): The Crypt, London; Sonic Vista Studios, Ibiza
- Genres: Ska; pop; 2 Tone; reggae
- Length: 47:18
- Label: Lucky 7/Cooking Vinyl
- Producers: Owen Morris; Charlie Andrew; Stephen Street; Clive Langer; Liam Watson; John Avila Additional producers (bonus tracks): Anthony Leung; Madness

Madness chronology
The Liberty of Norton Folgate (2009)	Oui Oui Si Si Ja Ja Da Da (2012)	Can't Touch Us Now (2016)

Singles from Oui Oui Si Si Ja Ja Da Da
- 1. "Death of a Rude Boy" Released: 12 August 2012 (pre-release give away download); 2. "My Girl 2 (official first single)" Released: 30 September 2012 (download only); 3. "Never Knew Your Name" Released: January 2013 (MP3 from album); 4. "How Can I Tell You" Released: 8 April 2013 (download only)

Alternative cover
- 2013 deluxe edition

Oui Oui Si Si Ja Ja Da Da is the tenth studio album by the English ska and pop band Madness, released on their own Lucky 7 Records label through Cooking Vinyl in the United Kingdom on 29 October 2012 and in the United States on 13 November 2012. The album does not feature founding member and bassist Mark Bedford, who was on hiatus from the band at the time. The album cover is by Peter Blake and features rejected titles for the album crossed out. The album was preceded by a 'teaser' song, "Death of a Rude Boy", available as a digital download from 12 August 2012 (along with a remix by Andrew Weatherall).

Oui Oui Si Si Ja Ja Da Da debuted at number No. 10 on the UK Albums Chart on 4 November 2012, becoming Madness' seventh studio album out of ten to reach the top 10 in the UK. It received favourable reviews in Q, Mojo, The Arts Desk and London evening newspaper Evening Standard amongst others, the notable exception being a poor review in the NME.

== Critical reception ==
Professional ratings
Aggregate scores
Source	Rating
Metacritic	71/100
Review scores
Source	Rating
AllMusic	4/5 stars
Daily Express	3/5 stars
The Independent	3/5 stars
Metro	4/5 stars
The Montreal Gazette	3.5/4 stars
NME	1/5 stars
The Observer	3/5 stars
Punknews.org	3.5/5 stars
The Scotsman	3/5 stars
State	3/5 stars

The review aggregating website Metacritic gave Oui Oui Si Si Ja Ja Da Da a "generally favorable" rating of 71% based on eight reviews. Among the most positive reviews were those from AllMusic and Metro, giving the album 4 stars out of 5. AllMusic called the album a "mini latter-day gem," while Metro wrote, "If you wondered if this could be a classic Madness album, the answer's in the affirmative." AllMusic described the album as a "clever and confident collection of savvy pop and ska, tunes that are effervescently melodic, lyrically nimble, and giddy with their dexterity."

Rating it 3 stars out of 5, the Daily Express called it a "rather good new album" that "may lack a little of the energy of the early albums." The Punknews.org website gave it 3½ stars out of 5, writing that it is "a perfect example of the band's ability to mix a wide array of styles held together by ska and reggae rhythms." They added, "Oui Oui Si Si Ja Ja Da Da isn't a perfect Madness album, but it is indeed a solid and fun listen." In a 1-star review in the NME, the reviewer felt that Madness is "half-arseing" their way through "a thick slurry of clod-hopping ska-by-numbers", and that it is "time to hang it up for good".

== Singles ==
The first single from the album – "My Girl 2" – was released in September 2012.

"Never Knew Your Name" was the second single off the album, released in January 2013. It became their biggest airplay hit since 1999's Top 10 hit "Lovestruck", reaching the UK Airplay Chart Top 25 and No. 88 in the UK Singles Chart. After the song was performed on The Jonathan Ross Show on 19 January, the album re-entered the UK Album Top 75 at No. 16 on 27 January.

On 22 February 2013, radio DJ Chris Evans played "How Can I Tell You", the third single from the album, during his Breakfast Show on which lead singer Suggs was his guest. The single was released on Monday 8 April on iTunes with an extra live version and a demo version by second singer Cathal Smyth.

The fourth single off the album – "Misery" – was released in July 2013.

== Deluxe 3-CD version ==
Guitar player Chris Foreman mentioned a planned box set version of the album, expected to be released in May 2013. On 28 February 2013, it was revealed that the album would be re-released in a deluxe version, with an extra CD containing 20 songs, including various original tracks not included on the album, a series of band demos and remixes and a John Lennon cover. This second CD's demo versions do not all feature Suggs on vocals, with "Black and Blue", "My Girl 2" and "Never Knew Your Name" having Mike Barson on vocals, "Death of a Rude Boy", "Misery" and "So Alive" featuring Cathal Smyth, and "Rules of Deolali" and "Check Mate La Luna" being instrumentals. The final demo, "I Got You (Kitchen Floor)" features Daniel Woodgate's brother Nick on vocals and a variety of instruments instead of regular band members. A DVD of the band's performance of the album at the Butlins "House of Fun" Weekender from 2011, along with a live CD of the following year's gig is also included. The latter CD also features Foreman's karaoke version of the Beastie Boys' "(You Gotta) Fight for Your Right (To Party!)" and Ian Dury's "Sex & Drugs & Rock & Roll".

The deluxe version features new artwork, featuring the band in various fancy dress costumes representing the different rejected titles for the album, in a similar vein to the cover of their The Rise & Fall album from 1982.

== BMG version ==
On 10 May 2024, BMG reissued Oui Oui, Si Si, Ja Ja, Da Da as an expanded edition over 2 CDs, which features the original album along with the bonus tracks and Misfit Mixes from the 2013 deluxe edition. BMG reissued the album along with another expanded version of an album originally issued on their Lucky 7 Records label, Can't Touch Us Now.

== Track listing ==
Oui Oui, Si Si, Ja Ja, Da Da track listing
No.	Title	Writer(s)	Producer(s)	Length
1.	"My Girl 2"	Mike Barson	Liam Watson	2:51
2.	"Never Knew Your Name"	Barson	Stephen Street	3:28
3.	"La Luna" (a.k.a. "La Luna el Mariachi")	Graham McPherson, Chris Foreman	John Avila, Charlie Andrew	3:38
4.	"How Can I Tell You?"	McPherson, Cathal Smyth	Street	3:18
5.	"Kitchen Floor"	Daniel Woodgate, Nick Woodgate	Owen Morris	3:21
6.	"Misery"	Smyth	Morris	3:16
7.	"Leon"	D. Woodgate, N. Woodgate	Andrew	3:48
8.	"Circus Freaks"	Lee Thompson, D. Woodgate	Morris	3:15
9.	"So Alive"	Smyth	Morris	2:58
10.	"Small World"	D. Woodgate	Andrew	3:46
11.	"Death of a Rude Boy"	Smyth	Street	3:50
12.	"Powder Blue" (bonus track)	Barson, McPherson	Andrew, Clive Langer	3:47
13.	"Black and Blue" (bonus track)	Barson	Andrew	3:01
14.	"My Girl 2" (alternative version; bonus track)	Barson	Langer, Andrew	3:01
Total length:				47:18

- Note that tracks 12–14 appear on all versions of the album, but are nonetheless promoted as bonus tracks.

=== 2013 deluxe edition ===
Disc 1 – Oui Oui Si Si Ja Ja Da Da

- The first disc contains the fourteen tracks from the original album.

Disc 2 – Bonus tracks +

No.	Title	Writer(s)	Producer(s)	Length
1.	"Deolali"	Thompson, Foreman	Andrew	3:40
2.	"1978"	McPherson	Anthony Leung	3:56
3.	"My Obsession"	Thompson, Foreman	Andrew	3:44
4.	"Big Time Sister"	Thompson, Foreman	Andrew	2:46
5.	"Oh My Love"	John Lennon, Yoko Ono	Madness, Leung	4:02
6.	"Crying"	Thompson, Keith Finch	Madness, Andrew	3:02
7.	"(You) Can't Keep a Good Thing Down"	Thompson, Foreman	Madness, Andrew	2:34

The Misfit Mixes
No.	Title	Writer(s)	Producer(s)	Length
8.	"Never Knew Your Name" (LA Discotheque Mix)	Barson	Andrew, Langer	4:24
9.	"La Luna" (Mix 6)	McPherson, Foreman	Morris	4:34
10.	"Circus Freaks" (Amy Mix)	Thompson, D. Woodgate	Andrew, Morris	3:13
11.	"Powder Blue" (Rehearsal Room Mix)	McPherson, Barson	Madness, Andrew	6:02

Band demos
No.	Title	Writer(s)	Length
12.	"Death of a Rude Boy"	Smyth	4:11
13.	"My Girl 2"	Barson	3:01
14.	"Never Knew Your Name"	Barson	3:21
15.	"I've Got You (Kitchen Floor)"	D. Woodgate, N. Woodgate	3:13
16.	"Misery"	Smyth	2:46
17.	"Black and Blue"	Barson	4:10
18.	"So Alive"	Smyth	2:49
19.	"Check Mate La Luna"	McPherson, Foreman	3:27
20.	"Rules of Deolali"	Thompson, Foreman	2:29
Total length:			71:25

Disc 3 – Live from the House of Fun Weekender November 23rd 2012

- Recorded live at Butlin's Minehead, Minehead, Somerset, England.

No.	Title	Writer(s)	Length
1.	"Intro" (introduction)		1:43
2.	"My Girl 2"	Barson	2:51
3.	"Never Knew Your Name"	Barson	3:49
4.	"La Luna"	McPherson, Foreman	4:03
5.	"How Can I Tell You"	McPherson, Smyth	3:54
6.	"Kitchen Floor"	D. Woodgate, N. Woodgate	3:51
7.	"Misery"	Smyth	3:47
8.	"Leon"	D. Woodgate, N. Woodgate	4:13
9.	"Circus Freaks"	Thompson, D. Woodgate	3:52
10.	"So Alive" (false start)	Smyth	1:13
11.	"So Alive"	Smyth	3:19
12.	"Small World"	D. Woodgate	4:03
13.	"Death of a Rude Boy"	Smyth	4:20
14.	"Black and Blue"	Barson	4:12
15.	"Fight for Your Right To Party"	Adam Horovitz, Adam Yauch, Michael Diamond, Rick Rubin	4:05
16.	"Big Time Sister"	Thompson, Foreman	3:21
17.	"Deolali"	Thompson, Foreman	3:59
18.	"Powder Blue"	Barson, McPherson	5:25
19.	"Sex and Drugs and Rock n Roll"	Ian Dury, Chaz Jankel	3:49
20.	"Our House"	Smyth, Foreman	4:17
21.	"It Must Be Love"	Labi Siffre	3:59
Total length:			78:08

DVD disc 4 – Live from the House of Fun Weekender November 25th 2011

- Filmed live at Butlin's Minehead, Minehead, Somerset, England.

No.	Title	Writer(s)	Length
1.	"Death of a Rude Boy"	Smyth
2.	"Black and Blue"	Barson
3.	"Big Time Sister"	Thompson, Foreman
4.	"Deolali"	Thompson, Foreman
5.	"My Girl 2"	Barson
6.	"La Luna"	McPherson, Foreman
7.	"(You) Can't Keep a Good Thing Down"	Thompson, Foreman
8.	"Kitchen Floor"	D. Woodgate, N. Woodgate
9.	"Never Knew Your Name"	Barson
10.	"Misery"	Smyth
11.	"1978"	McPherson
12.	"Crying"	Thompson, Finch
13.	"So Alive"	Smyth
14.	"How Can I Tell You"	McPherson, Smyth
15.	"Powder Blue"	McPherson, Barson
16.	"House of Fun"	Thompson, Barson
Total length:			55:51

== Personnel ==
Credits are adapted from the album's liner notes.

Madness

- Graham "Suggs" McPherson
- Cathal Smyth
- Mike Barson
- Chris Foreman
- Lee Thompson
- Daniel Woodgate

Additional personnel

- Bass guitar – Graham Bush
- Brass – Mike Kearsey, Joe Auckland, Steve Turner
- Percussion – Charlie Andrew (2, 4, 11, 13, 14), Lenny Edwards (5, 6, 8, 9), Spider L (1)
- Backing vocals – Charlie Andrew (7, 10, 14), James Porter (6, 9), Chris Schrier (6, 9), Frank Marshall (6, 9), Bob Walker (6, 9), Vanessa Contenay-Quinones (12, 14), Siobhan Fitzpatrick (10), Spider L (1), John Avila (3), Ray Suen (3)
- Trumpet – Brad Magers (3), Keith Douglas (3), Joe Auckland (10)
- Guitar – Joby Ford (3)
- Guitar andjarana – Ray Suen (3)
- Guitarron – Vincent Hidalgo (3)
- Cocktail drum kit – Jorma Vik (3)
- Melodica – Seamus Beaghen (11)
- Programming – Daniel Woodgate (10)
- Violin – Kirsty Mangan (5, 8, 10), Stephanie Benedetti (5, 8), Ellie Fagg (5, 8), Vicky Lyon (5, 8), Martin Lissola (5, 8), Amyn Merchant (7, 12), David Juritz (7, 12), Julian Leaper (7, 12), Yuri Kalnits (7, 12), Kerenza Peacock (2), Hayley Pomfrett (2), Jenny Sacha (2), Deborah Widdup (2), Anna Croad (2), Ray Suen [3]
- Viola – Natalie Holt (5, 8), Nick Barr (5, 8), Garfield Jackson (7, 12), Jon Thorn (7, 12), Emma Owens (2), Simon Tandree (2)
- Cello – Rachael Lander (5, 8), Nick Cooper (7, 12), Tim Gill (7, 12), Rosie Danvers (2)
- Harp – Camilla Pay (2)
- Brass arrangements – Madness, Mike Kearsey
- String arrangements – Daniel Woodgate (5, 7, 8), Mike Kearsey (5, 8), Simon Hale (12), Rosie Danvers (2), Kirsty Mangan (7), Mike Barson (5)
- Mariachi trumpet and string arrangements – William V. Malpede, John Avila (3)
- Strings conductor – Mike Kearsey (5, 8), Simon Hale (7, 12)

Technical personnel

- Cenzo Townshend – mixing (1, 2, 4, 6, 9, 11)
- Charlie Andrew – pre-production (2, 4, 5, 6, 8, 9, 11)
- Owen Morris – vocal production (3)
- Peter Blake – cover art
- Tony McGee – photography
- Luke Insect – design

Deluxe edition

- Mark Bedford – bass (2, 5)
- Baluji Shrivastav – sitar (2)
- Mike Kearsey, Joe Auckland, Steve Turner, Steve Hamilton – brass (3–9)
- Simon Hale, Julian Leaper, Amyn Merchant – string arrangements and conductors (11)
- Nick Woodgate – vocals, piano, keyboards, guitar (15)
- Daniel Woodgate – drums, programming (15)
- Michael McEvoy – bass (15)
- Charlie Brown, Sali-Wyn Ryan, Sarah Chapman, Nerys Richards – strings (15)
- Charlie Andrew – pre-production and additional tracking (2, 9), mixing (8)
- Louis Henry Sarmiento II – additional tracking (2)
- Anthony Leung – mixing (3–7, 10, 11), additional tracking (3, 4, 6, 7, 10), recording (5), additional recording (11), mixing (disc 3)
- Madness – mixing, recording (5)
- Clive Langer – mixing (8)
- John Avila – additional tracking (9)
- Peter Miles – audio mixing (DVD)
- John Davies – mastering
- Peter Blake – album title text
- Paul Agar – design, layout
- Perou – photography

== Chart positions ==
Chart performance for Oui Oui, Si Si, Ja Ja, Da Da
Chart (2012–2013)	Peak position
Belgian Albums (Ultratop Flanders)	171
Belgian Albums (Ultratop Wallonia)	140
Dutch Albums (Album Top 100)	37
French Albums (SNEP)	94
UK Albums (Official Charts)	10
UK Independent Albums (Official Charts)	1

== Certifications and sales ==
Certifications and sales for Oui Oui, Si Si, Ja Ja, Da Da
Region	Certification	Certified units/sales
United Kingdom (BPI)	Gold	100,000^{^}
^{^} Shipments figures based on certification alone.
