= Sonic Vista Studios =

Sonic Vista Studios is a recording studio located in Ibiza, Spain. Sonic Vista offers services such as: audio recording, mixing, mastering, remote recording, music production, voice-overs and overdubs.

== Background ==
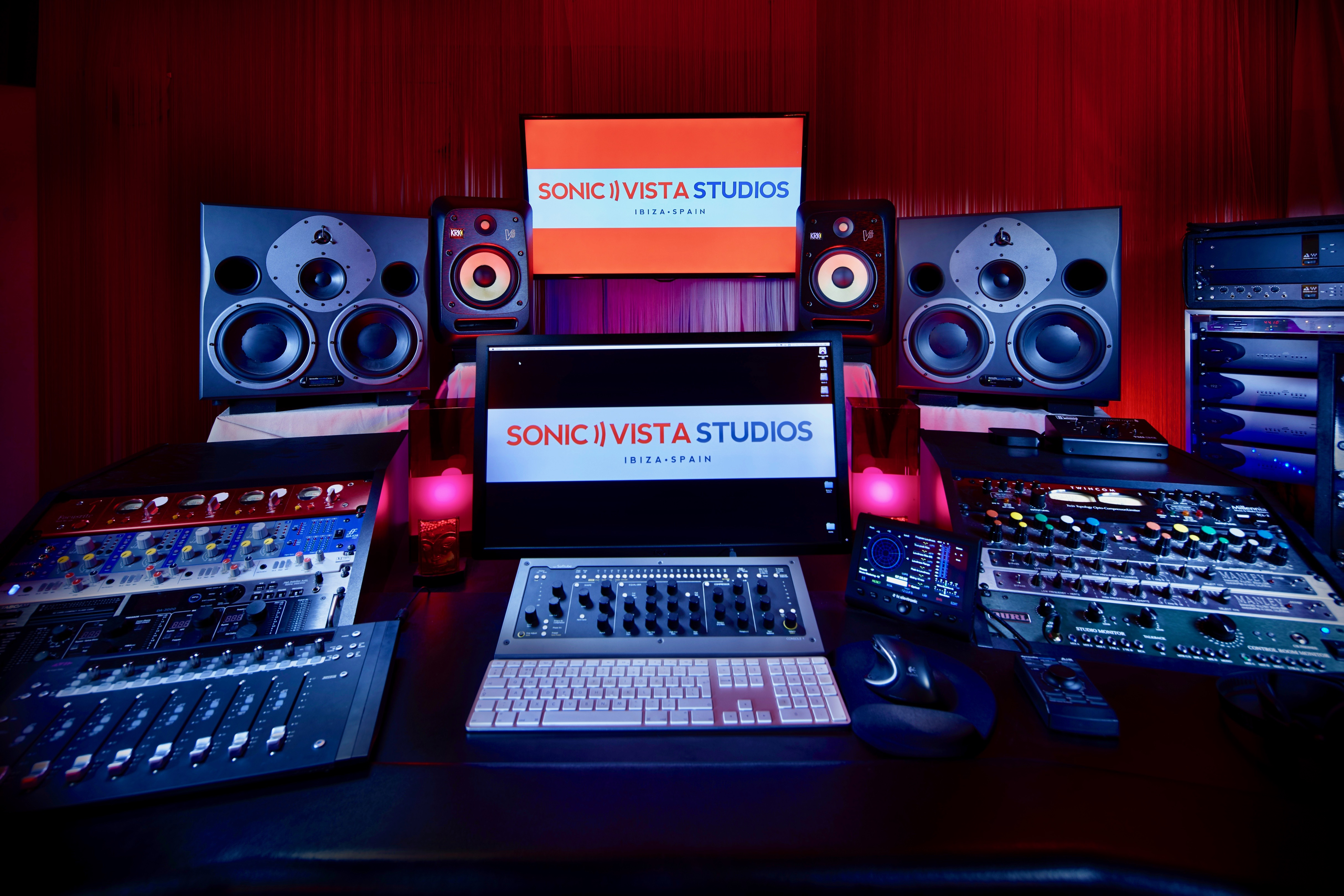
Sonic Vista Studios (Studio A)

Founded by L. Henry Sarmiento II, Sonic Vista Studios officially opened in November 2004. Conceptually, the studio was created around two main influences: Chris Blackwell's Compass Point Studios in Nassau, Bahamas and Rick Rubin's "The Mansion" in Laurel Canyon, Los Angeles. The objective was to offer artists an escape from the noisy city life as well as an inspiring location to create music.

The studio's first client was Hideo Kobayashi from Tokyo, Japan in 2004 who needed mastering for his album "Yellow Diamond".

In 2004 Apple's iTunes needed mastering services for their "iTunes Exclusive" releases and with a list of songs that needed to be polished before releasing them on iTunes Store. These songs were written and performed at Bad Habit Recordings (formally Sy Klopps Studios) in San Francisco, California by artists such as Goldfrapp, Bloc Party, Flaming Lips, Cat Power and Nouvelle Vague.

That same year was when the Pacha Group also became an official client.

In 2007, Ms. Dynamite wrote and recorded a record with Rez Safinia and Niara Scarlett.

In 2008 when Ibiza Rocks Hotel began hosting live music bands and Dj's, Sonic Vista put together a high-end remote rack for the occasion and has been recording their live performances ever since. Live recording and then mixing back at Sonic Vista for the Ibiza Rocks show on MTV England. Artist include: Ellie Goulding, Dizzie Rascal, Jake Bugg, Florence and the Machine, Calvin Harris and Biffy Clyro to name a few.

In 2009, Lady Gaga went to Ibiza accompanied by her producer RedOne for a show at Eden Club in San Antonio. Whilst on the Island they booked a songwriting/recording session with Sonic Vista and recorded the song Alejandro.

A few songs from Sounds from Nowheresville by the Ting Tings were written/recorded at Sonic Vista Studios in 2011. Other A-list artists also include Swedish House Mafia, David Guetta, Akon, Taio Cruz, Ne-Yo, Mousse T, Ms. Dynamite, Idris Elba, 50 Cent, Ester Dean and Priyanka Chopra.

In 2011, Eva Herzigová recorded a Voice over for a Dolce & Gabbana commercial.

Redfoo from LMFAO worked on his remix for Carly Rae Jepsen's song This Kiss in 2012 and David Guetta, Akon recorded the song Play Hard at Sonic Vista in July 2012.

Sander Kleinenberg worked on remixes for Katy Perry and Robin Thicke at Sonic Vista in 2013.

That same year, Sonic Vista mastered the official aftermovie for Ultra Music Festival in Miami.

Also in 2013, Lena Headey of HBO Game of Thrones recorded a voice over for their DVD collection.

It was the first studio to bring Pro Tools HD to Ibiza in 2004 and is the first to have a Pro Tools HDX system on the Island.

In 2014, Sonic Vista Studios became a writer for the music business column of "Headliner", a music technology lifestyle magazine.

== Equipment ==
The first piece of equipment that entered the studio was Pro Tools HD system and a special Roland digital chorus DC-50 previously owned by the Grateful Dead. Today, Sonic Vista Studios is the most equipped studio on the island having the very best of analogue and digital technology: Avid Pro Tools HDX, Burl Audio, Millennia, GML, Manley, Thermionic Culture, Elysia, Solid State Logic, Crane Song, Argosy Console, TC Electronic, Akai, Softube, Waves, Kush Audio, sE Electronics, Dynaudio, Monkey Banana, Yamaha, Modulus and many other brands.

== Louis Henry Sarmiento II ==
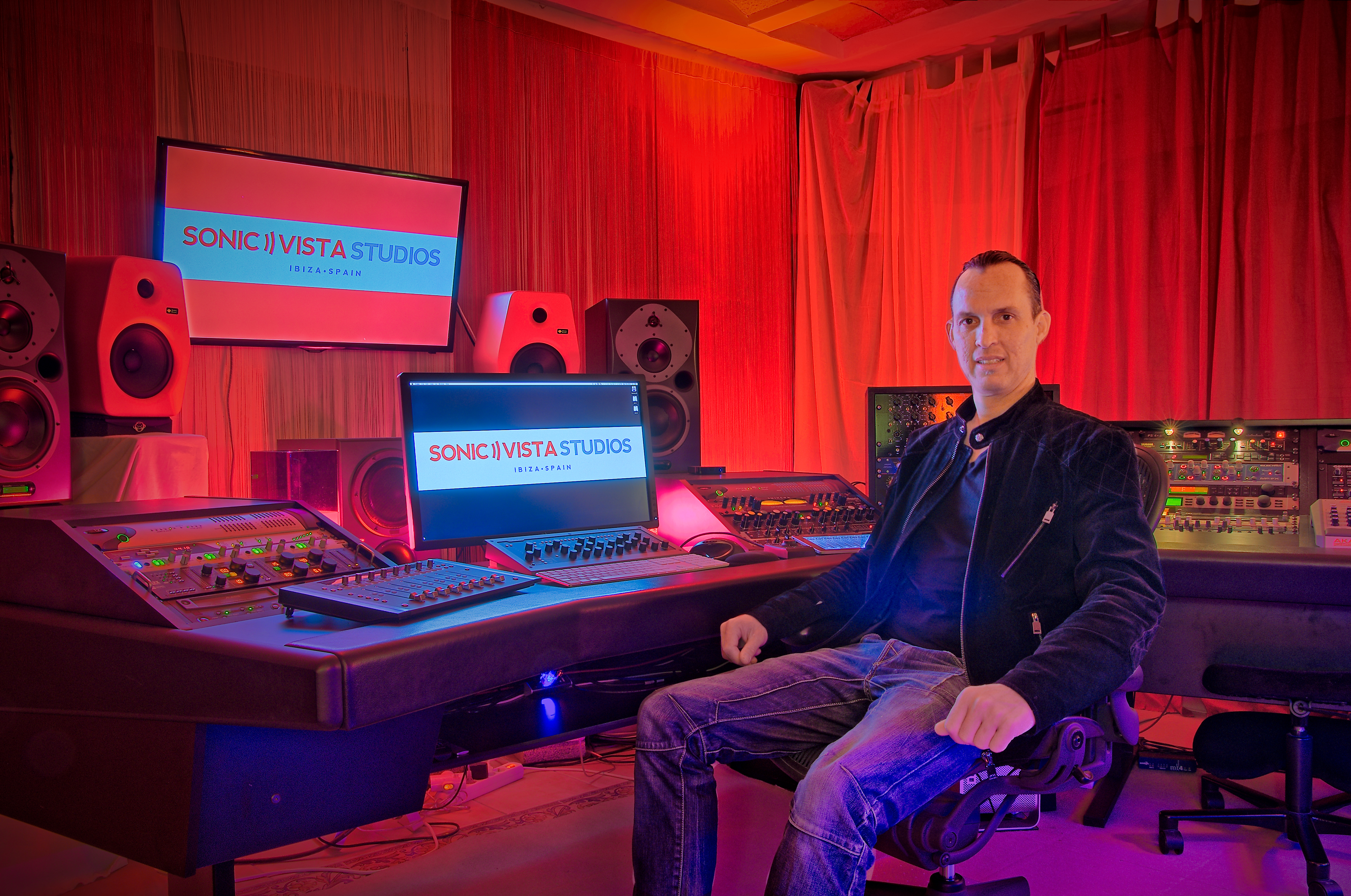
Louis Henry Sarmiento II (founder)

Louis Henry Sarmiento II was born in October 1971 of a Swedish mother and Colombian father. Growing up in New York, his musical endeavors started in 1988 when he hitchhiked to a Max Creek show and suddenly accompanied the band on the road as their roadie for a few shows. The experience was so enriching that the following year, during the summer of 1989, he decided to gather the remaining $200 in his pocket and drive west towards California to pursue a career in the music industry. After numerous trips across the country, he finally got offered his first official job as a roadie for the reggae group Strictly Roots in 1991 at the age of nineteen years. From roadie he went on to become the band's mixing engineer in 6 weeks, this attracted the attention of other groups such as Inka Inka, a band for which he engineered until 1996.

In 1997 he got involved with a Dot-com start-up company by the name of muzic.com. This new adventure encouraged him to move to San Francisco where the upcoming company would be housed at Herbie Herbert's warehouse with Sy Klopps Studios and Nocturne Productions. The company's reputation grew and got the attention of key figures in the music industry; doing demonstrations at MIDEM, Cannes as well as partnering up with Liquid Audio technology, the new start-up was one of the first to materialize the notion of digital distribution, a model that is now the main reference to how music is discovered, purchased and listened to by audiences today. muzic.com was at the forefront of the digital music revolution just waiting around the corner but never skyrocketed to success because of the Dot-com bubble that was soaring at the time.

However Herbie Herbert saw something special in Sarmiento and decided to keep him as Studio Executive/Engineer of Sy Klopps Studios. Before he knew it, Sarmiento was already recording significant bands such as Tower of Power, Starship and Trichromes (led by Bill Kreutzmann of the Grateful Dead and Herbie Herbert). He worked at Sy Klopps until 2004, the year he decided to leave to Ibiza to found Sonic Vista Studios.

His first experience in Ibiza was actually in 2003, when he came on holiday with friend/producer Miguel Migs who was doing a show at Pacha. At the time he felt that the music scene in San Francisco was becoming stale and thought about relocating to an Island. In 2003 Ibiza was already an important destination for music tourism but lacked in professional studios services. Sarmiento hence saw an opportunity and founded Sonic Vista Studios one year later. The first session being held on 29 November 2004. He is also the first person to bring a Pro Tools HDX system to the Island.

In 2016, Henry Sarmiento was featured on Billboard (magazine)'s story "The Real Ibiza".

== Clients ==
Artists	Studio Session	Description
Lady Gaga	Vocal Recording	Lady Gaga and Red One wrote Alejandro
50 Cent	Vocal Recording	Songwriting for G-Unit Inc.
Akon	Vocal Recording	Writing Play Hard with David Guetta
Ne-Yo	Vocal Recording	Songwriting Session
Taio Cruz	Vocal Recording	Writing for Def Jam
David Guetta	Engineering	Writing for 2U (song) with Jason "Poo Bear" Boyd
David Guetta	Vocal Recording	Producing Play Hard with Akon
Swedish House Mafia	Vocal Recording	Producing Session
Ting Tings	Recording	Recording songs for Sounds from Nowheresville
Priyanka Chopra	Vocal Recording	Recording New Album with RedOne Team and Ester Dean
Kelis	Vocal Recording	Songwriting Session
Idris Elba	Mixing	Remix of Something Really Bad
Redfoo	Production and Mixing	Remix for This Kiss for Carly Rae Jepsen
Lena Headey	Vocal Recording	Voice Over Sessions for Game of Thrones DVD
Eva Herzigová	Vocal Recording	Voice Over Sessions for Dolce & Gabbana Commercial
Plan B	Remote Recording	Live at Ibiza Rocks
Goldfrapp	Mastering	Mastered for iTunes Exclusive
Yeah Yeah Yeahs	Mastering	Mastered for iTunes Exclusive
No Doubt	Mixing	Anthony Gorry Remix of Settle Down
Dizzee Rascal	Remote Recording	Live at Mallorca Rocks Hotel
