= Young Forever (disambiguation) =

"Young Forever" is a 2009 song by Jay-Z.

Young Forever may also refer to:

- Young Forever (Aberfeldy album) or the title song, by Aberfeldy, 2004
- Young Forever (Nessa Barrett album), an album by Nessa Barrett, 2022
- "Young Forever" (The Ready Set song), 2011
- "Young Forever", a song by Eric Paslay, 2018
- "Young Forever", a song by JR JR, 2019
- "Young Forever", a song by Nicki Minaj from Pink Friday: Roman Reloaded, 2012

== See also ==
- The Most Beautiful Moment in Life: Young Forever, an album by BTS, 2016
- Forever Young (disambiguation)
