= Lucky 7 Records =

British record label

- Founded: 2007
- Founder: Madness
- Status: Active
- Genre: Ska; pop
- Country of origin: United Kingdom

Lucky Seven Records were founded by the British band Madness.

The launch of this new record label enabled them to release their new material. So far the label has released six Madness singles including "Sorry", "NW5", "Dust Devil", "Sugar and Spice", "Forever Young", "My Girl 2" and the albums The Liberty of Norton Folgate, which returned Madness to the top ten of the UK Albums Chart, Oui Oui Si Si Ja Ja Da Da and Can't Touch Us Now.

Lucky Seven Records is not the first Madness label to be set up. Zarjazz Records, a sub label of Virgin Records released the Madness album, Mad Not Mad, music from the Fink Brothers along with Feargal Sharkey's first single. Another Virgin sub-label, Live & Intensified, existed solely to release The Dangermen Sessions Vol. 1 and its associated singles.

It is presently uncertain whether Lucky Seven Records will sign any other talents, despite Zarjazz having signed other musicians.
