= Embarrassment (song) =

1980 single by Madness

Single by Madness

from the album Absolutely
- B-side: "Crying Shame"
- Released: 14 November 1980
- Recorded: 1980
- Genre: New wave; pop
- Length: 3:10
- Label: Stiff
- Composer: Mike Barson
- Lyricist: Lee Thompson
- Producers: Clive Langer; Alan Winstanley

Madness singles chronology
"Baggy Trousers" (1980)	"Embarrassment" (1980)	"The Return of the Los Palmas 7" (1981)

Music video
- "Embarrassment" on YouTube

"Embarrassment" is a song recorded by ska/pop band Madness, predominantly written by Lee Thompson, but partially credited to Mike Barson. The band first began performing the song at live shows in April 1980, and it was featured on their second studio album, Absolutely.

The song was released as a single on 14 November 1980 and spent 12 weeks in the UK singles chart, reaching a high of number 4. The song was remixed for issue as a single, which is different from the album version, although they both have the same running time.

== Lyrical content ==
The meaning behind the song was particularly dark, considering the band's previous material. Primarily written by Lee Thompson, the plot of the song reflected the unfolding turmoil following the news that his teenage sister, Tracy, had become pregnant and was carrying a black man's child. The subsequent rejection by her family, and the shame felt, was reflected in the song.

As Thompson was on the road with the band, he only heard snippets of the story, through phone calls and letters, but this was enough for him to piece the story together. The song is a clear indication of changing attitudes (see miscegenation). The real-life story had a happy ending, however; Thompson later stated that when her daughter Hayley was born, the antipathy of Tracy's relatives dissolved.

== Music video ==
Suggs at the Embassy Club Bar.

The music video for the single was filmed in Embassy Club, London, on 7 and 8 November 1980. The music video was particularly dark for Madness, corresponding to the lyrical content of the song. The video mainly features Suggs at a gloomy bar, interspersed with shots of the band playing various brass instruments.

== Appearances ==
In addition to its single release and appearance on the album Absolutely, "Embarrassment" also appears on the Madness collections Divine Madness (a.k.a. The Heavy Heavy Hits), Complete Madness, It's... Madness, The Business, Our House and the US compilation Ultimate Collection.

The single was reissued on 12" vinyl for Record Store Day in 2024.

== Track listing ==
7" single

1. "Embarrassment" (Barson/Thompson) - 3:10
2. "Crying Shame" (Barson) - 2:36

12" single (Record Store Day 2024)

1. "Embarrassment (Original 7" mix)" (Barson/Thompson) - 3:04
2. "Not Home Today" (McPherson/Bedford) - 2:44
3. "E.R.N.I.E." (Thompson/McPherson) - 2:09
4. "Embarrassment (Instrumental)" (Barson/Thompson) - 3:06
5. "Crying Shame" (Barson) - 2:40
6. "You Said" (McPherson/Barson) - 2:34

== Charts ==
=== Weekly charts ===
Chart (1980–81)	Peak position
Belgium (Ultratop 50 Flanders)	11
Ireland (IRMA)	4
Netherlands (Dutch Top 40)	2
Netherlands (Single Top 100)	4
UK Singles (Official Charts)	4

=== Year-end charts ===
Chart (1981)	Position
Netherlands (Dutch Top 40)	33
Netherlands (Single Top 100)	36

== Certifications and sales ==
Region	Certification	Certified units/sales
United Kingdom (BPI)	Gold	500,000^{^}
^{^} Shipments figures based on certification alone.
