= Jamaican Gold =

Jamaican Gold is an independent record label from Netherlands specialized in Jamaican music reissues.

Aad Van Der Hoek founded the label in 1992 and has since been working closely with Jamaican producers and sound engineers, transferring usually the music directly from the original mastertape in Jamaica.

All the albums are compilations with new liner notes based on interviews done with the artists or producers highlighted. Byron Lee, Alvin Ranglin, Derrick Harriott, Clancy Eccles, Lloyd Daley, Bunny Lee, Lee Perry or Clement Dodd among others.

== See also ==
- List of record labels
