= Our House: The Original Songs =

Our House: the Original Songs

Greatest hits album by Madness
- Released: 21 October 2002
- Recorded: 1979–2002
- Genres: Ska; pop; reggae
- Label: V2 Records

Madness chronology
| Wonderful (1999) | Our House: the Original Songs (2002) | The Dangermen Sessions Vol. 1 (2005) |

Professional ratings
Review scores
| Source | Rating |
|---|---|
| AllMusic | link |

Our House: the Original Songs is a greatest hits album by the English ska-pop group Madness, released in 2002. It was released as a result of the stage show Our House, and comprises the tracks which were included in the musical. The album features two new songs: "Simple Equation" and "Sarah's Song".

== Track listing ==
1. "House of Fun" 2:49
2. "Our House" 3:20
3. "Simple Equation" 4:00
4. "My Girl" 2:41
5. "Baggy Trousers" 2:46
6. "Prospects" 4:13
7. "Embarrassment" 3:10
8. "Driving in My Car" 3:18
9. "Grey Day" 3:38
10. "Shut Up" 3:26
11. "The Return of the Los Palmas 7" 2:01
12. "The Sun and the Rain" 3:30
13. "Tomorrow's (Just Another Day)" 3:12
14. "Night Boat to Cairo" 3:30
15. "Wings of a Dove" 3:01
16. "One Better Day" 4:06
17. "The Rise & Fall" 3:15
18. "Sarah's Song" 3:45
19. "White Heat" 3:48
20. "Michael Caine" 3:39
21. "It Must Be Love" (2002 Mix) 3:25

== Certifications and sales ==
| Region | Certification | Certified units/sales |
|---|---|---|
| United Kingdom (BPI) | Silver | 60,000^{^} |
^{^} Shipments figures based on certification alone.
