= NW5 =

2008 single by Madness

Single by Madness

from the album The Liberty of Norton Folgate
- Released: 14 January 2008
- Recorded: 2007
- Genre: Pop, ska
- Length: 3:49
- Label: Lucky 7 Records
- Songwriters: Mike Barson; Lee Thompson
- Producer: Clive Langer

Madness singles chronology
"Sorry" (2007)	"NW5" (2008)	"Dust Devil" (2009)

"NW5" is a song by the band Madness, which was debuted live at the Brixton Academy in December 2006. The single was released in January 2008 on the band's own label, Lucky 7 Records, and entered the chart at No. 24 on 20 January 2008, and at No. 1 on the UK Independent Chart. It was very well received by fans and critics alike.

The song was subsequently included on their critically acclaimed 2009 album The Liberty of Norton Folgate and has become a regular at Madness concerts.

The song's title is a reference to the UK postal code area for the north London district of Kentish Town, from where the band originated. It was written by saxophone player Lee Thompson and pianist Mike Barson, who also wrote some of the band's other hits including "House of Fun".

The B-side "Bittersweet" is a cover of the Undertones song, recorded for the Dangermen Sessions.

== Formats and track listings ==
These are the formats and track listings of major single releases of "NW5".

7" single

1. "NW5" (Barson/Thompson) – 4:14
2. "Bittersweet" (O'Neil) – 2:43

CD single

1. "NW5" (radio edit) (Barson/Thompson) – 3:49
2. "NW5" (Barson/Thompson) – 4:14
3. "Bittersweet" (O'Neil) – 2:43
4. "NW5" (Man Like Me remix) – 3:29

DVD single

1. "NW5" (video) (Barson/Thompson) – 3:49
2. "Night Boat to Cairo" (video) (Barson/McPherson) – 2:38
3. "My Girl" (video) (Barson) – 2:43
4. "It Must Be Love" (video) (Siffre)- 2:21

iTunes download

1. "NW5" (radio edit) (Barson/Thompson) – 3:49
2. "NW5" (Barson/Thompson) – 4:14
3. "NW5" (Man Like Me remix) – 3:29
4. "NW5" (instrumental) – 4:14

== German release ==
"NW5"

Single by Madness
- Released: 30 March 2007
- Recorded: 2007
- Genre: Pop
- Length: 3:34
- Label: Sony BMG
- Songwriters: Mike Barson; Lee Thompson
- Producers: Clive Langer; Liam Watson

The track "NW5" was originally released as a single in Germany (titled "NW5 (I Would Give You Everything)") after appearing in the film Neues vom Wixxer, a sequel to Der Wixxer (2004). The 2007 version of "NW5" is different to the 2008 Lucky Seven Records version, with the earlier recording having a darker tone. This version also featured guitarist Kevin Burdette instead of original Madness guitarist Chris Foreman who had left the group in mid-2005. Foreman re-joined Madness later in 2007 and can be heard on the 2008 release.

The B-side for the German release was a new recording of "It Must Be Love".

Two promo videos were made for "NW5" and the new "It Must Be Love", featuring Suggs, Carl Smyth, Daniel Woodgate, stand-in guitarist Kevin Burdette, and members of the film's cast. Oliver Kalkofe, leading actor, co-writer and co-producer of the film, had been a fan of Madness since the 1980s and was responsible for the collaboration, which he described as a "dream come true" for him. The new video for "It Must Be Love" featured in the film's credits.

=== German track listing ===
- CD single
1. "NW5 (I Would Give You Everything)" (radio edit) (Barson/Thompson) – 3:34
2. "It Must Be Love" (Wixx-Mixx 2007) (Siffre) – 4:00
3. "NW5 (I Would Give You Everything)" (album version) (Barson/Thompson) – 4:14
4. "NW5 (I Would Give You Everything)" (Live@Wembley Arena 12/06) - 3:54
5. "It Must Be Love (2007)" (video)
6. "NW5 (I Would Give You Everything)" (video)
7. "Making of NW5 Video"

== Chart performance ==
Chart (2008)	Peak position	Total weeks
UK Singles Chart	24	2
UK Indie Chart	1	9
