= Dust Devil (song) =

Single by Madness

Single by Madness

from the album The Liberty of Norton Folgate
- Released: 11 May 2009
- Recorded: 2008
- Genre: Ska
- Length: 3:22
- Label: Lucky 7 Records
- Songwriters: Daniel Woodgate; Lee Thompson
- Producers: Clive Langer; Alan Winstanley

Madness singles chronology
| "NW5" (2008) | "Dust Devil" (2009) | "Sugar and Spice" (2009) |

"Dust Devil" is a single by the ska/pop band Madness, released 11 May 2009, precisely one week before their album The Liberty of Norton Folgate.

The B-side, "The Roadette Song" was originally recorded by Ian Dury with his band, Kilburn and the High Roads. The Madness cover version was originally intended to be on their 2005 album The Dangermen Sessions Vol. 1.

The somewhat arcane lyrics have been explained in an online posting:

"Dust Devil by Madness paints a vivid portrait of a young woman who defies convention, moving through life with a rebellious energy that feels both chaotic and magnetic. The song captures her as a free-spirited figure, unbound by societal expectations, and the speaker’s longing to connect with her.

The lyrics are steeped in imagery that hints at a life lived on the fringes, where rules are ignored and individuality is celebrated.

The chorus returns to the plea, “Come down, I am missing you,” with a sense of desperation and affection. The speaker imagines the girl’s fingers painting or drawing her into a picture, a metaphor for wanting to capture her essence or bring her into his world. These lines highlight a deep emotional pull, a yearning to bridge the gap between the speaker and the girl’s untamed existence. The lyrics dig into the girl’s defiance, from keeping a “gizmo under her pillow” to “writing the landlord out another open cheque.” These details signal a life lived outside the boundaries of traditional behavior, one that is both rebellious and self-sufficient. The repeated lines about the “little dust devil” whipping up a storm reinforce her role as a force of nature, unafraid to disrupt the status quo. The song ends with the certainty that “they surely would” - a nod to the inevitability of the girl’s impact, even if she remains just out of reach."

== Music video ==
The music video for "Dust Devil" was released onto YouTube on 20 April 2009. It features Jaime Winstone and her then-boyfriend Alfie Allen.

== Chart ==
The single reached #64 in the UK singles chart and #1 in the UK Independent music chart on 17 May 2009.

== Formats and track listings ==
These are the formats and track listings of major single releases of "Dust Devil".

CD Single

1. "Dust Devil" (Radio Edit) - 3:22
2. "Dust Devil" (Ashley Beedle Warbox Remix) - 5:09
3. "The Roadette Song" (Hardy/Dury) - 3:36
4. "Dust Devil" (Practice Makes Perfect Reggae Style) - 3:47

7" Single

1. "Dust Devil" (7" Mix)
2. "The Roadette Song" (Hardy/Dury) - 3:36

10" Single

1. "Dust Devil" (Original Version) - 3:43
2. "Dust Devil" (Ashley Beedles Warbox extended dubplate special)

== Chart performance ==
| Chart (2009) | Peak position | Total weeks |
|---|---|---|
| UK Singles Chart | 64 | 1 |
| UK Indie Chart | 1 | 6 |
