= Harmonically enhanced digital audio =

Class of digital recordings

Harmonically Enhanced Digital Audio (HEDA) is a class of digital recordings created by using modern digital harmonic enhancement technology. With the proliferation of harmonic enhancement algorithms, pioneered by Crane Song's Dave Hill, a new class of harmonic enhancement algorithms have emerged.

Examples of algorithms used to create HEDA include the HEAT feature (available on Pro Tools HD 8.1 and later) and the multi-platform plug-ins Universal Audio's Studer A800, Slate Digital's Virtual Console Collection, Waves Non-Linear Summer, and Crane Song HEDD-192.

== History ==
Development of harmonic enhancement was in its first stages in 1999 when Antares, developer of Autotune, noticed that the tube emulation feature in its microphone simulator was used more than its other features. In response, Antares created a specific plug-in, called Antares Tube, which implemented tube emulation. The algorithms for harmonic enhancement were just beginning and market interest was shown to be present. During its development period, harmonic exciters and harmonic enhancement plug-ins were looked down upon by most of the pro-audio industry.

== Modern Harmonic Enhancement ==
HEAT (Harmonic Enhancement Algorithm Technology), released in 2010, is a plug-in featured on each track of HD editions of Pro Tools. Avid, developer of Pro Tools, enlisted the help of Dave Hill of Crane Song for its creation. Dave Hill's harmonic enhancement algorithms have been viewed as top-of-the-line by many professionals for years. Before Pro Tools 8.1, no Digital Audio Workstation (DAW) featured harmonic enhancement on each track.

Alternatives available on other platforms are Universal Audio's Studer A800 plug-in (released in late 2010), Slate Digital's Virtual Console Collection (VCC), Sonimus Satson, and Waves' Non-Linear Summer (NLS).
