= Forever Young (Madness song) =

2010 single by Madness

Single by Madness

from the album The Liberty of Norton Folgate
- Released: 18 January 2010
- Recorded: 2008
- Genre: Ska, pop
- Length: 3.13
- Label: Lucky 7
- Songwriter(s): Graham McPherson
- Producer(s): Clive Langer; Alan Winstanley

Madness singles chronology
"Sugar and Spice" (2009)	"Forever Young" (2010)	"My Girl 2" (2012)

"Forever Young" is a single by the band Madness, released on 18 January 2010. It was the fourth and last single to be taken from the album The Liberty of Norton Folgate, peaking at #199 in the UK.

Unlike the previous single "Sugar and Spice", "Forever Young" was released both physically on CD and on 7 inch vinyl, as well as digitally.

The single version of "Forever Young" (the "Melt Music Edit") is shorter and slightly faster than the album version, having been remixed by drummer Daniel Woodgate's company Melt Music. There is also the "Future Cut Remix", which is also faster but resembles older Madness tracks. The B-side is a cover of the Billy Ocean song "Love Really Hurts Without You", recorded in the sessions leading up to Madness's 2006 album The Dangermen Sessions Vol. 1.

== Formats and track listings ==
These are the formats and track listings of major single releases of "Forever Young".

- CD single
1. "Forever Young (Melt Music Radio Edit)" (McPherson) – 3:13
2. "Forever Young (Future Cut Remix)" (McPherson) – 3.28
3. "Forever Young (J Star Mr Wallace Dub" (McPherson) – 3:35
4. "Forever Young (Live From Later With Jools Holland)" (McPherson) – 3:52
5. "Love Really Hurts" (Charles Leslie Sabestian/Findon Benjamen David) – 3.18
- 7" single
1. "Forever Young (Original Version)" (McPherson) – 4.38
2. "Forever Young (J Star Mr. Wallace Dub" (McPherson) – 3:35
