= RaVen Quartet =

Former British string quartet

- Origin: Soho
- Genres: Classical, rock
- Years active: 2007-2014
- Members: Stephanie Benedetti (violin); Natalie Holt (viola); Rachael Lander (cello); Kirsty Mangan (violin)

RaVen Quartet was a London-based string quartet that performed arrangements of both classical and rock music. The quartet performed with Madness during the 2012 London Olympics closing ceremony. The group separated in 2014.

== Members ==
=== Stephanie Benedetti ===
Stephanie Benedetti was one of the group's violinists. Her sister is Scottish classical violinist Nicola Benedetti. Stephanie is currently a member of British pop group Clean Bandit.

=== Natalie Holt ===
The group's viola player, Natalie Holt, is a British classical musician and film composer. She hit the headlines in 2013 after interrupting the final of the seventh series of Britain's Got Talent.

=== Rachael Lander ===
Rachael Lander was the group's cellist.

=== Kirsty Mangan ===
Kirsty Mangan was one of the group's violinists.
