= The Liberty of Norton Folgate =

Studio album by Madness
- Released: 18 May 2009
- Recorded: 2006–2008
- Studios: The Yard; Miloco; Toe Rag (London)
- Genres: Ska; pop; reggae
- Length: 60:56
- Labels: Lucky Seven; Yep Roc (US)
- Producers: Clive Langer; Alan Winstanley

Madness chronology
The Dangermen Sessions Vol. 1 (2005)	The Liberty of Norton Folgate (2009)	Oui Oui, Si Si, Ja Ja, Da Da (2012)

Singles from The Liberty of Norton Folgate
- 1. "NW5" Released: January 2008; 2. "Dust Devil" Released: May 2009; 3. "Sugar and Spice" Released: August 2009; 4. "Forever Young" Released: January 2010

The Liberty of Norton Folgate is the ninth studio album by the English band Madness, released on 18 May 2009. The band worked on the album for close to three years and it was their first album of new material since 1999's Wonderful.

== Content ==
The 10-minute title track recounts the social history of a corner of east London that until 1900 was controlled by St Paul's Cathedral. As a "liberty" it was not legally independent, but the rights of the Crown over the land had been waived. A shortened version of the track "The Liberty of Norton Folgate" was made available on YouTube in mid May 2008. In December a boxset of the album was offered for pre-order on the Madness website; those who ordered were entitled to a digital download of the album on 20 December. Twenty-three tracks were recorded for the album, of which fifteen made it on to the album to be released in May. The twelve tracks issued in the digital download leaked onto the internet on 25 December 2008. During concerts in Sydney, Melbourne and Adelaide at the end of March 2009, lead singer Suggs stated that "Dust Devil" would be the second single off the new album; second when accounting for the 2008 release of "NW5". It was released on 11 May, one week before the album. A third single, "Sugar and Spice" (with slightly different lyrics and intro to the album version) was released to radio in July, and on 21 July it was confirmed that it would be made available as a download single from 2 August on iTunes and 3 August from other retailers.

In November 2009 the band announced the release of a fourth single scheduled for 11 January 2010: "Forever Young", a favourite of both fans and band. Apart from several remixes, one of the single formats contains "Love Really Hurts (Without You)", a Dangermen era cover of the Billy Ocean classic. The release was put back one week and the single was released on 18 January, becoming the second single from the album to fail to chart.

It was produced by Clive Langer and Alan Winstanley, who have worked with Madness on all but one of their albums. Initial recording sessions began at Toe Rag Studios in spring 2006 with Liam Watson, who engineered and mixed Elephant by the White Stripes. The band recorded sporadically, now without Watson, until early 2008.

The band showcased a number of songs from the new album during three concerts at London's Hackney Empire in June 2008.

== Reception ==
Professional ratings
Review scores
Source	Rating
AllMusic	link
BBC	(favourable) link
The Daily Telegraph	link
Evening Standard	link
Financial Times	link
Hot Press	(4/5)
The Independent	link
Mojo	4/5 stars
MusicOMH	link
PopMatters	link
Rolling Stone	link
Scotland on Sunday	link
The Times	link
Uncut	link

Critical reception to The Liberty of Norton Folgate was highly positive, with most critics hailing it as Madness' best album in their thirty-year career. The Financial Times, in a five-star review, lauded that "[at] a stage of life when they might be endlessly revisiting "Our House" and "Baggy Trousers" on the 1980s nostalgia circuit, the much-loved ska-pop band, 30 years after their debut, have ripped up the form book and delivered a knockout album." The BBC described it as a "magnificent magnum opus" and "the most sophisticated and satisfying album of their career." Uncut and Mojo both gave the album four out of five stars, with Uncut calling the concept album "refreshingly, unexpectedly excellent", and observing that "everything seems to gel – the arrangements are the best ever." Online music magazine MusicOMH said it "may just be the best thing they have ever recorded" and "it is everything you would expect of Madness and more." The Word described it as "Peter Ackroyd writing for the Kinks, it's Sherlock Holmes in Albert Square, it's a Mike Leigh movie of Parklife, it's Passport To Pimlico meets Brick Lane, and it is Madness's masterpiece."

The album also made 3rd and 9th place, respectively, in the BBC's and Mojo's "Best albums of 2009" lists (category rock & pop).

== Track listing ==
=== Standard edition ===
This edition was released on 18 May 2009.

No.	Title	Writer(s)	Length
1.	"Overture"	Mike Barson	1:07
2.	"We Are London"	Cathal Smyth	3:40
3.	"Sugar and Spice"	Barson	2:52
4.	"Forever Young"	Graham McPherson	4:36
5.	"Dust Devil"	Lee Thompson, Daniel Woodgate	3:44
6.	"Rainbows"	Thompson, Woodgate	3:22
7.	"That Close"	McPherson, Chris Foreman	4:10
8.	"MK II"	McPherson, Smyth	2:22
9.	"On the Town" (with guest vocals by Rhoda Dakar)	Woodgate, Barson	4:32
10.	"Bingo"	Thompson, Barson	4:06
11.	"Idiot Child"	Thompson, Barson	3:18
12.	"Africa"	Barson	4:19
13.	"NW5"	Thompson, Barson	4:14
14.	"Clerkenwell Polka"	Smyth	4:20
15.	"The Liberty of Norton Folgate"	McPherson, Barson, Smyth	10:10
Total length:			60:56

=== Special edition boxed set ===
This edition was made available for pre-order in late 2008 and was released on 23 March 2009. It contains a 2-CD version of the album and an additional CD of rehearsal recordings, demos and live recordings. Also included is a Madness "M" pin, a poster, and access to an online area that will contain additional material.

All of disc 3 contains material exclusive to this release. The seven tracks marked with a (*) on disc 2 are also exclusive to this release.

Disc 1

The Liberty of Norton Folgate
No.	Title	Writer(s)	Length
1.	"Overture"	Barson	1:07
2.	"We Are London"	Smyth	3:40
3.	"Sugar and Spice"	Barson	2:52
4.	"Forever Young"	McPherson	4:36
5.	"Dust Devil"	Thompson, Woodgate	3:44
6.	"Rainbows"	Thompson, Woodgate	3:22
7.	"That Close"	McPherson, Foreman	4:10
8.	"MK II"	McPherson, Smyth	2:22
9.	"On the Town"	Woodgate, Barson	4:32
10.	"Clerkenwell Polka"	Smyth	4:20
11.	"The Liberty of Norton Folgate"	McPherson, Barson, Smyth	10:10
Total length:			45:04

Disc 2

The Liberty of Norton Folgate
No.	Title	Writer(s)	Length
1.	"Let's Go" (*)	McPherson, Barson	3:30
2.	"Idiot Child"	Thompson, Barson	3:18
3.	"Mission From Hell" (*)	Thompson, Barson	3:49
4.	"Seven Dials" (*)	McPherson, Barson	2:53
5.	"Hunchback of Torianno" (*)	Thompson, Woodgate	3:11
6.	"Fish & Chips" (*)	Smyth	2:41
7.	"Bingo"	Thompson, Barson	4:06
8.	"NW5"	Thompson, Barson	4:14
9.	"One Fine Day" (*)	McPherson, Foreman	3:58
10.	"The Kiss" (*)	McPherson, Barson	4:06
11.	"Africa"	Barson	4:19
Total length:			40:14

Disc 3

Practice Makes Perfect
No.	Title	Writer(s)	Length
1.	"Dust Devil (Version 1)" (rehearsal)	Thompson, Woodgate
2.	"Let's Go" (rehearsal)	McPherson, Barson
3.	"Clerkenwell Polka" (rehearsal)	Smyth
4.	"Forever Young" (rehearsal)	McPherson
5.	"Seven Dials" (rehearsal)	McPherson, Barson
6.	"On the Town" (rehearsal)	Woodgate, Barson
7.	"Fish & Chips Parade" (rehearsal)	Smyth
8.	"Idiot Child" (rehearsal)	Thompson, Barson
9.	"We Are London" (Cathal Smyth demo)	Smyth

Hackney Live & Correct
No.	Title	Writer(s)	Length
10.	"We Are London" (live)	Smyth
11.	"Idiot Child" (live)	Thompson, Barson
12.	"Bingo" (live)	Thompson, Barson
13.	"NW5" (live)	Thompson, Barson
14.	"On the Town" (live)	Woodgate, Barson
15.	"MK II" (live)	McPherson, Smyth
16.	"Sugar and Spice" (live)	Barson
17.	"Dust Devil" (live)	Thompson, Woodgate
18.	"Clerkenwell Polka" (live)	Smyth
19.	"Forever Young" (live)	McPherson
20.	"The Liberty of Norton Folgate" (live)	McPherson, Barson, Smyth

- Tracks 1–8 are rehearsal recordings, April 2007.
- Tracks 10–20 recorded live at Hackney Empire, London, June 2008.

Vinyl LP

Side A
No.	Title	Writer(s)	Length
1.	"We Are London"	Smyth	3:40
2.	"Forever Young"	McPherson	4:36
3.	"Dust Devil"	Thompson, Woodgate	3:44
4.	"Sugar and Spice"	Barson	2:52
5.	"The Liberty of Norton Folgate"	McPherson, Barson, Smyth	10:10

Side B
No.	Title	Writer(s)	Length
6.	"Clerkenwell Polka"	Smyth	4:20
7.	"Bingo"	Thompson, Barson	4:06
8.	"Rainbows"	Thompson, Woodgate	3:22
9.	"That Close"	McPherson, Foreman	4:10
10.	"MK II"	McPherson, Smyth	2:22
11.	"Idiot Child"	Thompson, Barson	3:18
12.	"On the Town"	Woodgate, Barson	4:32
Total length:			51:17

== Film ==
A 64-minute-long concert film, also titled The Liberty of Norton Folgate was directed by Julien Temple. It screened at the London Independent Film Festival on 17 April 2009.

== Chart performance ==
The Liberty of Norton Folgate reached No. 5 in the UK album charts on 24 May 2009, their highest charting studio album since 7 in 1981. The album also charted on the UK independent album chart, lasted on the chart up until the following February which they topped twice on May and June of 2009. The album was certified gold in the UK in October 2009.

Chart (2009)	Peak position	Total weeks
Belgian Albums Chart (Vl)	70	2
Belgian Albums Chart (Wa)	78	2
Dutch Albums Chart	52	4
European Hot 100 Albums Chart	?	3
French Albums Chart	110	3
German Albums Chart	80	1
Irish Album Chart	31	3
Swedish Albums Chart	47	2
UK Albums Chart	5	13
UK Independent Albums Chart	1	37

== Certifications and sales ==
Region	Certification	Certified units/sales
United Kingdom (BPI)	Gold	100,000^{^}
^{^} Shipments figures based on certification alone.

== Personnel ==
Madness

- Graham "Suggs" McPherson – vocals
- Cathal Smyth – vocals
- Mike Barson – piano, keyboards
- Chris Foreman – guitar
- Mark Bedford – bass
- Lee Thompson – saxophone
- Daniel Woodgate – drums

Additional personnel

- Graham Bush – additional bass
- Rhoda Dakar – vocals on "On the Town"
- Amber Jolene – backing vocals on "Forever Young", "Dust Devil" and "Mission From Hell"
- Sasha Paul – backing vocals on "Forever Young", "Dust Devil" and "Mission From Hell"
- Jim Parmley – percussion
- Joe Auckland – trumpet
- Steve Turner – saxophone
- Michael Kearsey – trombone
- Mark Brown – clarinet
- Dave Powell – tuba
- Sirish Kumar – tabla
- Andy Findon – Turkish clarinet, zorna, duduk
- Simon Hale – string arrangements, conductor, additional piano and keyboards on "MKII", "Fish & Chips" and "One Fine Day"
- Julian Leaper – violin
- Emil Chakalov – violin
- Martin Burgess – violin
- Sue Briscoe – violin
- Chris Pitsilledes – viola
- Nick Holland – cello
- Millennia Strings – strings
- The London Session Orchestra led by Gavyn Wright – strings

Technical

- Clive Langer – production, mixing, initial production
- Alan Winstanley – production, mixing
- Liam Watson – initial production
- Finn Eiles – engineer
- Werner Freistätter – assistant engineer on "Forever Young"
- Tim Young – mastering engineer
- Paul Rider – photography
- Martin 'Cally' Callomon – art direction, design
- Nik Rose – retouching, assembly
