= The Dangermen Sessions Vol. 1 =

The Dangermen Sessions, Vol. 1

Studio album by Madness
- Released: 16 August 2005
- Recorded: 2004–2005
- Studios: Livingston Recording Studios; Whitfield Street Studios; Fallout Shelter; Miloco Studios (London)
- Genres: Ska; reggae; 2 tone
- Length: 37:22
- Labels: Live and Intensified (an imprint of V2 Records)
- Producers: Dennis Bovell; Steve Dub; Segs; Madness

Madness chronology
Wonderful (1999)	The Dangermen Sessions, Vol. 1 (2005)	The Liberty of Norton Folgate (2009)

Singles from The Dangermen Sessions Vol. 1
- 1. "Shame & Scandal" Released: 25 July 2005; 2. "Girl Why Don't You?" Released: 28 November 2005

Professional ratings
Aggregate scores
Source	Rating
Metacritic	63/100
Review scores
Source	Rating
AllMusic	3/5 stars
Drowned in Sound	6/10 stars
The Guardian	2/5 stars
PopMatters	6/10 stars
Uncut	1.5/5 stars

The Dangermen Sessions, Vol. 1 is a cover album and the eighth studio album by the English ska band Madness, released in 2005. The album reached No. 11 in the UK which at the time was their highest chart position in the UK since 1984's Keep Moving.

== The Dangermen ==
Prior to recording the album, Madness played a series of low-key gigs under the alias the Dangermen, performing mostly cover versions which they had performed in their early days as the Invaders. A selection from the set list was then chosen to be recorded for the album. Some songs which were played live but not included on the album included "Skylarking" and "Dreader Than Dread" (both released as B-sides on the "Shame and Scandal" single), "Wonderful World, Beautiful People", "Papa's Got a Brand New Pigbag" and "It Miek", as well as the Prince Buster numbers "One Step Beyond" and "Madness", both of which the group had already released in 1979. The live concerts also included Dangermen "covers" of a few of Madness' more ska-influenced original compositions, such as "Night Boat to Cairo" and "The Prince".

Singer Suggs said of some of the song choices: "The irony is that many of the songs had already been recorded in reggae form, such as "You Keep Me Hanging On" or even "Lola". So even though they ended up a little Madness-ified, we based our version on the reggae cover version, not the original song itself."

Guitarist Chris Foreman appeared on most of the album, but he left the group during the sessions and was therefore not a member of the group at the time of the album's release and did not take part in promotion for the album. He would later re-join the group. Co-producer John "Segs" Jennings filled in on guitar on the remaining tracks.

The album booklet contains both serious sleeve notes in which the various members of the group discuss their choice of songs, and fictional notes concerning the history of the group "the Dangermen", who are claimed to have been an influential reggae group formed in Havana in the 1960s, and who have reformed after 35 years to record the album.

Each member of Madness has an alter ego in the Dangermen:

- Mark Bedford – Lester Bernham, born at sea and washed-up on the shores of Cuba with a bass guitar made of driftwood.
- Cathal "Chas Smash" Smyth – Jimmy Oooh, an itinerant singer.
- Daniel Woodgate – Daniel Descartes, experimental percussionist born in Paris and leader of touring band, the Daniel Descartes Collective.
- Mike Barson – Professor Psykoticus, a Hungarian-born musician (his supposed birthplace being the small town of Mezőhegyes) who worked in sonic weapons research in the USSR before being introduced to the music of the Daniel Descartes Collective, which led to the formation of the Dangermen.
- Suggs – Robert Chaos "The Poet", found in a Gladstone bag at the feet of Miles Davis by Dexter Gordon, and a founding member of the Dangermen.
- Chris Foreman – Christofos Formantos, of whom nothing is known.
- Lee Thompson – "Unnamed", atmospheric scientist and part-time sax player.

== Reception ==
The Guardian called the album "modestly agreeable listening", adding that "the translation from raucous pub to sober recording studio has squeezed out much of the combo's spontaneous lunacy." Although reggae classics such as "Shame & Scandal" and "The Israelites" are faithfully reproduced, according to the Entertainment.ie website, they also felt that the album lacks the band's trademark quirky sense of humour. MusicOMH wrote that most of the tracks could easily be a single, but felt that on some of the ska tracks, the production is "a little too clean". PopMatters wrote, "All the songs bop along at about the same pace, all interpreted in the same rocksteady style, and this makes the proceedings a bit wearisome towards the end. But when Madness does it right it's clear they're still very much in possession of the skills that made them so unique."

== Track listing ==
No.	Title	Writer(s)	Original artist	Length
1.	"This Is Where"	Cathal Smyth, Mike Barson, Mark Bedford, Graham McPherson	Madness	0:30
2.	"Girl Why Don't You?"	Cecil Campbell	Prince Buster	3:05
3.	"Shame & Scandal" (aka "Shame and Scandal in the Family")	Lord Melody, Lancelot Pinard	Lord Melody / Sir Lancelot	2:52
4.	"I Chase the Devil" (aka "Ironshirt")	Max Romeo, Lee Perry	Max Romeo	3:20
5.	"Taller Than You Are"	Joseph Abraham Gordon	Lord Tanamo	2:27
6.	"You Keep Me Hanging On"	Brian Holland, Lamont Dozier, Eddie Holland	The Supremes	3:08
7.	"Dangerman" (aka "High Wire")	Edwin Astley	Edwin Astley & His Orchestra	2:42
8.	"Israelites"	Desmond Dekker, Leslie Kong	Desmond Dekker & the Aces	3:03
9.	"John Jones"	Rudy Mills, Derrick Harriott	Rudy Mills	3:28
10.	"Lola"	Ray Davies	The Kinks	3:21
11.	"You'll Lose a Good Thing"	Barbara Lynn Ozen	Barbara Lynn	2:42
12.	"Rain"	José Feliciano, Hilda Feliciano	José Feliciano	2:56
13.	"So Much Trouble in the World"	Bob Marley	Bob Marley and the Wailers	3:44

== Chart performance ==
Chart (2005)	Peak position	Total weeks
Belgian Albums Chart (Vl)	93	1
Belgian Albums Chart (Wa)	39	8
Dutch Albums Chart	59	3
European Hot 100 Albums Chart	?	3
French Albums Chart	17	15
German Albums Chart	81	2
Swiss Albums Chart	67	4
UK Albums Chart	11	4

== Personnel ==
Madness

- Graham "Suggs" McPherson – lead vocals
- Mike Barson – keyboards
- Chris Foreman – guitar
- Mark Bedford – bass
- Lee Thompson – saxophones
- Daniel Woodgate – drums
- Cathal Smyth – backing vocals, spoken intro (4)

Additional musicians

- Steve Dub – additional programming and synthesizer
- John "Segs" Jennings – additional guitar, additional drums (3), backing vocals (3, 11)
- Ingo Vauk – programming
- Steve Turner – saxophone
- Joe Auckland – trumpet
- Mike Kearsey – trombone
- Dennis Bovell – timbales (2)
- Jade Greaves – steel pan (3)
- Simon Wilcox – trumpet (12)
- Ellie Hajee – backing vocals (11)
- Carole Thompson – backing vocals (13)
- Janet Kay – backing vocals (13)
- David Bedford – musical direction, string arrangements (10, 12)
- Isobel Griffiths – string contractor (10, 12)
- Gavyn Wright – violin (10, 12)
- Perry Montague-Mason – violin (10, 12)
- Julian Leaper – violin (10, 12)
- Warren Zielinski – violin (10, 12)
- Boguslaw Kostecki – violin (10, 12)
- Jackie Shave – violin (10, 12)
- Chris Tombling – violin (10, 12)
- Patrick Kiernan – violin (10, 12)
- Jamie, Timothy and Joey Barson – backing vocals

Technical

- Dennis Bovell – production (1–7, 9, 11, 13)
- Steve Dub – production (1, 10, 12), additional production (2–9, 11, 13), engineering, mixing
- John "Segs" Jennings – production (1, 10, 12), additional production (2–9, 11, 13)
- Madness – production (1, 8)
- Ben Thackeray – engineering
- Steve Masters – engineering
- Jason Olliffe – assistant engineering
- Jill Furmanovsky – photography
- Tony McGee – photography
