= Mark Bedford =

English musician, songwriter and composer

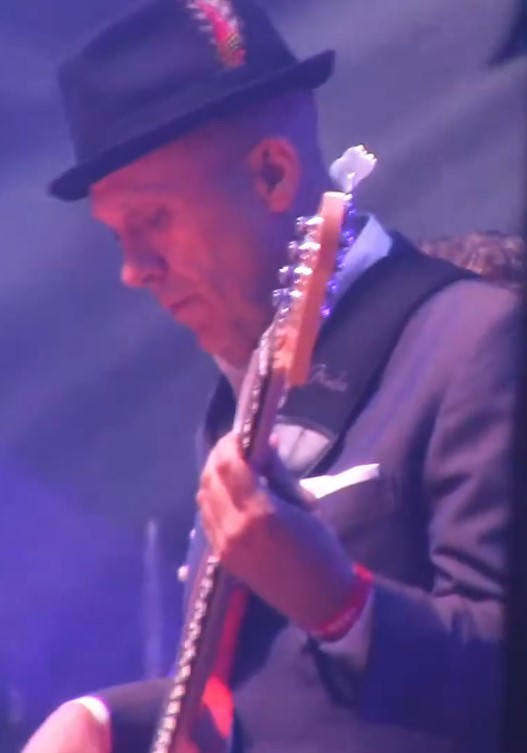
- Bedford performing live with Madness

Background information
- Also known as: Bedders
- Born: Mark William Bedford; 24 August 1961 (age 65); Islington, London, England
- Genres: Ska; pop; new wave; two-tone
- Occupations: Musician; songwriter; composer
- Instrument: Bass guitar
- Years active: 1978–present
- Member of: Madness; The Lee Thompson Ska Orchestra
- Formerly of: Voice of the Beehive

Mark William Bedford (born 24 August 1961), nicknamed Bedders, is an English musician, songwriter and composer. Bedford came to prominence in the late 1970s as the bassist for the ska and pop band Madness.

== Early life ==
Mark Bedford was born on 24 August 1961, in Islington, London, England. He started to buy records at the age of 11 or 12. Around this time, he listened to music in the charts and North American artists such as Neil Young. He began to play bass guitar at the age of 13 in order to accompany friends who played the guitar.

Bedford worked as at a silk screen printing business before Madness.

== Career ==
=== Madness ===
Bedford attended William Ellis School in Kentish Town, where he played in his first band at thirteen years old. In 1978, Bedford met members of the North London Invaders at one of their gigs. He was asked to a band rehearsal and was impressed by the musicianship on display, as well as the determination of keyboardist Mike Barson. Bedford was friends with the Invaders' drummer Gary Dovey, but after a confrontation with saxophonist Lee Thompson, Dovey left the band. Bedford brought Dan Woodgate into the band, and he was introduced as the final member of the then six-piece group which became Madness.

Although not a major songwriter in Madness, Bedford co-wrote one of the band's more emotive songs "One Better Day" with Suggs. He was also responsible for co-writing "Not Home Today", "Disappear", "Return of the Los Palmas 7", "Deceives the Eye", "Stepping into Line" and "Maybe in Another Life". The only song he wrote entirely on his own was "Mummy's Boy", which appeared on the band's debut album One Step Beyond... The most recent song he wrote for Madness was "Maybe In Another Life", which was the B-side of their 1986 farewell single, "(Waiting For) The Ghost Train".

Madness reformed in 1992 with all seven original members. Bedford was briefly inactive from the band in 1995 and 1996, with Norman Watt-Roy of The Blockheads stepping in for him.

Bedford's stage performances with Madness became more sporadic after 2009; he did not tour with the band in Australia in the early part of that year, though he did feature as a full member of the band on their album The Liberty of Norton Folgate released that May. Suggs stated: "It’s like the Eagles song ['Hotel California']. You can check out any time you like, but you can never leave...There’s a lot of flexibility, allowing people to be what they want to be, and do what they want."

During his hiatus from Madness, he did appear alongside the band for a few one-off occasions. Bedford took no part in the recording of Oui Oui, Si Si, Ja Ja, Da Da but he appeared in a TV advert with the group, promoting a popular beer. He also performed with the band on the roof of Buckingham Palace in June 2012 as part of Queen Elizabeth II Diamond Jubilee Concert and for the band's appearance in August at the 2012 Summer Olympics closing ceremony. The following year, he appeared with the band on The Jonathan Ross Show on 19 January 2013 and again on 22 March 2013 when the group performed at the official closing ceremony of BBC Television Centre in London. Bedford's hiatus from the band ended after four years in 2013, when he returned full-time, and remains a permanent member.

=== Other musical work ===
Bedford played double bass on Robert Wyatt's recording of the Elvis Costello song "Shipbuilding" in 1982.

After Madness split for the first time in 1986, Bedford briefly played bass with Voice of the Beehive, and in 1991 played bass on Morrissey's second studio album Kill Uncle. He played double bass on some tracks on the album. He later teamed up with ex-Higsons brass supremo Terry Edwards, and they formed Butterfield 8 along with various members of the jazz scene at the time. They released a single "Watermelon Man" and an album called Blow! This was re-released in 2001 on the Sartorial Records label.

Since 2011, Bedford has been part of The Lee Thompson Ska Orchestra, a band he put together with Madness saxophonist Lee Thompson. The Lee Thompson Ska Orchestra released their debut album The Benevolence of Sister Mary Ignatius in 2013. They released a single "Fu Man Chu" featuring Bitty McLean from this album, and in February 2014, released a second single "Bangarang" featuring Dawn Penn and Sharon Shannon.

The Near Jazz Experience (NJE), a new band with Terry Edwards, released the album Afloat in 2017.

Mark currently co-hosts the monthly Top Marks Music Podcast on Shoreditch Radio with musician Mark Anthony.

=== Design ===
Bedford trained at the London College of Printing. During a break from Madness, he re-trained there, and then founded his own design studio, Mar Mar Co., who have worked with galleries including Victoria and Albert Museum and the Imperial War Museum. They also designed and produced products for the Tate Modern.

== Personal life ==
In 1987, Bedford started a relationship with Cressida, his long-term partner. They have two daughters, born in 1993 and 1997. He is 5'10" tall.

== Discography ==
Madness

The Near Jazz Expericne

- 2017: Afloat
- 2021: Nought To 60
- 2023: Live in London
- 2025: Tritone

Other

- 1982: "Shipbuilding" – single by Robert Wyatt
- 1988: Blow! – album by Butterfield 8
- 1991: Kill Uncle – album by Morrissey
- 2013: The Benevolence of Sister Mary Ignatius – album by The Lee Thompson Ska Orchestra
- 2016: Bite the Bullet – album by The Lee Thompson Ska Orchestra
