= Dan Woodgate =

English musician, songwriter, composer and record producer

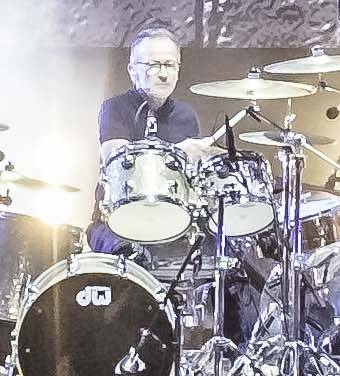
- Woodgate in 2024

Background information
- Also known as: Woody Woodgate
- Born: Daniel Mark Woodgate; 19 October 1960 (age 65); Kensington, London, England
- Genres: Ska; pop; reggae; new wave; alternative rock; pop rock; 2-tone
- Occupations: Musician; songwriter; composer; engineer; record producer
- Instruments: Drums; keyboards; percussion
- Years active: 1978–present
- Labels: London; DW; Stiff Records
- Member of: Madness
- Formerly of: Voice of the Beehive; Magic Brothers
- Website: woodywoodgate.co.uk

Daniel Mark "Woody" Woodgate (born 19 October 1960) is an English musician, songwriter, composer and record producer. In a career spanning 45 years, Woodgate came to prominence in the late 1970s as the drummer for the English ska band Madness and went on to become a member of the Anglo-American alternative rock band Voice of the Beehive in the late 1980s. Woodgate began his solo career in 2015, while still a member of Madness, releasing the album In Your Mind.

== Early years ==
Daniel Mark Woodgate was born on 19 October 1960, in Kensington, west London, England. His mother was an actress and his father was a photographer. Both of his grandfathers were conductors; one had his own band and did variety shows and worked with Shirley Bassey, the other formed the BBC Choral Singers.

His mother left the family home when he was four years old. As children, he and his younger brother Nick lived with their father in Camden Town, north London. They were looked after by nannies and Au pairs. Woodgate attended Haverstock School from 1972–1978. After leaving school, he worked for a time as a graphic designer, sign writer/printer and then as a building work/labourer.

Woodgate received his first drum kit when he was 12 years of age. When he was 14, he and Nick started their first band called Steel Erection. Interviewed by the Daily Express in 2013, Woodgate recalled: "We were really close and spent every hour of every day together. When Nick was about 10, dad realised he had a real talent for playing the guitar. I couldn't play a thing so I took up the drums and we formed a band together called Steel Erection." The two went on to play in other bands. Nick and Dan Woodgate continued to have associated music careers.

== Career ==
=== Madness ===
Woodgate encountered Madness after being introduced at a rehearsal by their bass guitarist Mark Bedford. In 1978 he joined the band, replacing Gary Dovey. After briefly changing their name from Invaders to Morris and the Minors, the band renamed itself as Madness in 1979.

Madness went on to achieve most of their success in the early to mid-1980s. The band spent 214 weeks on the UK Singles Chart during that decade, holding the record for most weeks spent by a group in the 1980s UK Singles Chart. Since forming, Madness have had 15 singles reach the UK Top 10. One of these is the UK number-one single ("House of Fun") and two were number-ones in Ireland, "House of Fun" and "Wings of a Dove". Woodgate's brother Nick is credited as a co-writer on the Madness songs "No Money", "Kitchen Floor", "Leon" "Good Times", "Don't Leave the Past Behind You" and "Another Version of Me".

Woodgate is one of the less regular songwriters in the band, but is credited as co-writer on the hits "The Return of the Los Palmas 7" and "Michael Caine", as well as on the 2009 single "Dust Devil", which reached #64. He is the sole credit on "Sunday Morning" from The Rise & Fall album, and "Small World" on Oui Oui Si Si Ja Ja Da Da. Most recently, he was the sole writer of "Round We Go", "Hello Sun" and "Long Goodbye" for the band's 2023 album, Theatre of the Absurd Presents C'est la Vie.

=== Voice of the Beehive ===
Woodgate also played drums with Voice of the Beehive. American sisters Tracey Belland (vocals/guitar) and Melissa Belland (vocals) formed the band in 1986 with Woodgate and fellow British members Martin Brett (bass guitar) and Mike Jones (guitar). Woodgate's Madness bandmate Mark Bedford also participated in the group during its formative stages. The band had initial success in the UK, US and Australia, releasing five Top 40 singles from two albums in the UK.

Their biggest commercial success was with the singles, "Don't Call Me Baby", "Monsters and Angels", "I Think I Love You", "I Walk The Earth" and "I Say Nothing" from their first two albums Let It Bee and Honey Lingers. Woodgate left the band in 1992 when Madness reformed, with the band continuing without him. In 1996, the band released a third album Sex & Misery and then disbanded. The band reformed in 2003 and played a two-week UK tour. In 2008 they released tracks from the tour on a live CD titled "Don't Call Me Baby."

=== Later career ===
From 1992–95 Woodgate worked with his own band Fat, playing clubs in England, France and the US. He signed to London Records and released the single "Downtime."

In 2014, the Magic Brothers, Woodgate's duo with his brother Nick, released an album titled The Magic Line on Woodgate's DW Records label. The album was dedicated to the brothers' father Crispin Woodgate.

On 1 June 2015, Woodgate released a solo debut In Your Mind on the DW Records label. The album began life as the second release for the Magic Brothers but eventually became more of a solo project for Woodgate. Guest vocalists on the album include the Velveteen Orkestra's singer Dan Shears.

== Personal life ==
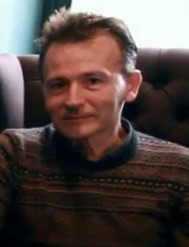
Woodgate in 2012

Woodgate grew up in Camden and was previously married to Jane Crockford of the Mo-dettes, and remarried in 1997 to Siobhan Fitzpatrick with whom he had one daughter, Mary. In 2009, he completed the London Marathon in a time of 3 hours and 37 minutes. Woodgate is 5'6 tall.

Woodgate's brother Nick has struggled with schizophrenia since his teens, after taking LSD, and in 2013 Woodgate became an ambassador for the charity Rethink Mental Illness.

== Discography ==
Studio album

- In Your Mind (2015)

Single

- "In Your Mind" (2015)
