= Clive Langer =

English record producer and songwriter (born 1954)

- Born: Clive William Langer; 19 June 1954 (age 72); Hampstead, London, England
- Genres: Rock; pop; new wave
- Occupations: Record producer; songwriter
- Years active: 1970s–present

Clive William Langer (born 19 June 1954) is an English record producer and songwriter, active from the mid-1970s onwards.

He usually works with Alan Winstanley. He composed the music for the films Still Crazy (1998) and Brothers of the Head (2005).

== Biography ==
Langer was born in 1954, to a Jewish Polish father who had fled Poland to escape the Nazis, before later settling in England and enlisting in the Royal Air Force. Having grown up in London, Langer studied at art school in Canterbury and at the Liverpool College of Art.

Prior to his record producing career he was a guitarist with the British cult band Deaf School.

Langer sometimes performed under the alias of 'Cliff Hanger', and his production work was sometimes attributed to 'Clanger'. After Deaf School, in mid 1977, Langer joined Big in Japan which he suggested to his friend Bill Drummond (later founder of Zoo Records and member of The KLF) to form, but Langer quit shortly afterwards and began a new band, Clive Langer and the Boxes. Their releases were I Want the Whole World, a 12" EP released in 1979 on Radar Records. and Splash!, an album released in 1980 on F-Beat Records.

Langer co-wrote the song "Shipbuilding" with Elvis Costello, and played organ on the version by Robert Wyatt which was a Top 40 hit in the UK.

As of 2025, he lives in Hackney, London and is tee-total.

== Albums produced by Langer and Winstanley ==
- One Step Beyond ... – Madness (1979)
- Absolutely – Madness (1980)
- Kilimanjaro – The Teardrop Explodes (1980)
- 7 – Madness (1981)
- Rhythm Breaks The Ice – Bette Bright and the Illuminations (1981)
- Wilder – The Teardrop Explodes (1981)
- Too-Rye-Ay – Dexys Midnight Runners (1982)
- The Rise & Fall – Madness (1982)
- Punch the Clock – Elvis Costello and the Attractions (1983)
- Keep Moving – Madness (1984)
- Goodbye Cruel World – Elvis Costello and the Attractions (1984)
- Despite Straight Lines – Marilyn (1985)
- Easy Pieces – Lloyd Cole and the Commotions (1985)
- Mad Not Mad – Madness (1985)
- What Price Paradise – China Crisis (1986)
- People – Hothouse Flowers (1988)
- Flood – They Might Be Giants (1990)
- Bona Drag – Morrissey (1990)
- Home – Hothouse Flowers (1990)
- Kill Uncle – Morrissey (1991)
- The Rockingbirds – The Rockingbirds (1992)
- Sixteen Stone – Bush (1994)
- Frestonia – Aztec Camera (1995)
- Local – Ho-Hum (1996)
- Wonderful – Madness (1999)
- The Science of Things – Bush (1999)
- Paper Scissors Stone – Catatonia (2001)
- Mink Car – They Might Be Giants (2001)
- Jealous God – Nathan Larson (2001)
- Lifelines – a-ha (2002)
- The First Drop – Fireapple Red (2004)
- Oh No! – Crackout (2004)
- Please Describe Yourself – Dogs Die in Hot Cars (2004)
- So This Is Great Britain? – The Holloways (2007)
- The Liberty of Norton Folgate – Madness (2009)

== Albums produced by Langer ==
- Brothers of the Head (soundtrack) (2006)
- Oui Oui, Si Si, Ja Ja, Da Da (2012)
- Can't Touch Us Now (2017)
