= Unreleased Madness album =

Studio album by Madness
- Released: Summer 1987 (unreleased)
- Recorded: July–September 1986 (demos) September–November 1986 (final production cancelled)
- Studio: Liquidator Studios, London
- Genre: Ska; world; soul; pop rock; synthpop; reggae; jazz fusion
- Length: Unknown
- Label: Zarjazz (UK)
- Producer: Clive Langer, Alan Winstanley (Initially); Madness (Thereafter)

Madness chronology
Utter Madness (1986)	Unreleased Madness album (1987)	The Madness (1988)

Singles from Unreleased Madness Album
- 1. "Waiting for the Ghost Train" Released: 27 October 1986

The unreleased Madness album was to be the seventh studio album by the English ska/pop band Madness. In early July 1986, they returned from a long, grueling tour incorporating Australia and America culminating with some European and UK festivals. Between July and early September they recorded demos for this new album at their Liquidator Studios in North London. From these demos they selected a sequenced track listing of 11 songs to be produced for the finished album. At least one other track ("Gabriel's Horn") was also demoed, indicating there may have been others additionally recorded.

The chosen album was announced with its track listing displayed in Issue XIV (14) of the official Madness "MIS" Nutty Boys fanzine (published during August 1986). However, after Issue XIV was printed and before it was posted out to members, the band decided to split up due to musical differences. They announced their break up in September 1986. Consequently, they abandoned the album before it was about to become finally produced between September and November that year, to then be released the following summer.

Another prominent reason why the album was not completed was because four of the members (Carl, Suggs, Lee and Chris) wished to use the tracks they had written for the next band they were forming. Nonetheless, the full six remaining members of the band did manage to record two tracks, "(Waiting For) The Ghost Train" and its B-Side "Maybe in Another Life". These tracks became the group's farewell single. The Unreleased Madness Album was quickly substituted with a rush-released second compilation album titled Utter Madness.

The band officially split in November following the release of their last single, which reached a high of number 18 in the UK.

== Producers ==
The recorded tracks were produced by Madness stalwarts Clive Langer and Alan Winstanley who, for the first time in the band's history, were drastically dropped. In the meanwhile, Madness subsequently continued to produce themselves. The released track "Maybe In Another Life" was produced with assistance of Liquidator engineers Ian Horne and Mark Saunders. The Nutty Boys fanzine mentioned that Stuart Levine might produce the album as "the band were getting stale and needed a new direction and some fresh ideas".

== Musical style ==
After the heavily polished studio production incorporating drum machines on Madness's previous album, Mad Not Mad (1985), the 1986 demos seemed to indicate a more organic back to basics approach towards song writing as with their earlier works. Nonetheless, the songs remained only demos at this stage and perhaps therefore lack a sufficiently comprehensive indication as to how they may or may have not developed in terms of finished studio production.

== Album cover design ==
The band ran a competition in Issue XIV (14) of Nutty Boys for MIS members to design gatefold album cover. The issue stated: "The theme will be ghosts, hocus pocus, hubble bubble, forests and streams, witching hour, creatures of the night, etc." Entries were expected to be received by 13 October 1986. Some results were posted in Nutty Boys Issue 15 (titled 'The End'); although due to the band subsequently splitting up before Issue XIV was released no winner was chosen.

In John Reed's book House of Fun: The Story of Madness, Madness sleeve designer Paul Clewley mentioned that the band had wished to "photographed sitting in front of a blazing fire in a large, dark and gloomy room. The only illumination was to be the flames with the shot being taken from the actual fireplace, looking through the flames out at the bands faces". He goes on to reveal "I think the idea was they were telling ghost stories to each other".

== Singles ==
Issue XIV of Nutty Boys stated that "11th Hour", "Waiting for the Ghost Train", "Be Good Boy" and "Natural Act" were "being tipped at this very moment as potential singles (wow) for the summer release". As already mentioned, only "Waiting for the Ghost Train" was actually released.

== The Madness ==
In 1988, four members of the band – Suggs, Chas Smash, Lee Thompson and Chris Foreman – continued under the name The Madness. They used several of the unreleased album's recorded demo tracks towards their own album and subsequent single releases. The other tracks remain unreleased to this day in studio form, although some demos and live recordings have appeared on bootlegs as well as official single releases during the 1990s. After one self-titled album and two singles that failed to make the top 40, this band also split.

== Legacy ==
According to John Reed's book House of Fun: The Story of Madness, the tracks "continue to be the subject of conjecture among their fans, fuelled by subsequent investigation".

== Track listing ==
No.	Title	Writer(s)	Length
1.	"11th Hour"	Graham McPherson; Chris Foreman	Unknown
2.	"(Waiting For) The Ghost Train"	Graham McPherson	3:45
3.	"Be Good Boy"	Chris Foreman; Lee Thompson	Unknown
4.	"Natural Act"	Cathal Smyth; Graham McPherson	Unknown
5.	"Maybe in Another Life"	Cathal Smyth; Graham McPherson	3:00
6.	"Precious One"	Cathal Smyth; Lee Thompson	Unknown
7.	"Patience" (full vocal version)	Cathal Smyth; Graham McPherson	3:42
8.	"Remember the Day"	Graham McPherson	Unknown
9.	"Perfect Place"	Graham McPherson; Chris Foreman	3:13
10.	"4.B.F. (For Bryan Ferry)"	Lee Thompson	Unknown
11.	"It's for the Best"	Lee Thompson	3:10

Notes

1. "Precious One" (live version) was released on the 1992 CD single version of "My Girl".
2. "Perfect Place" was released as excerpts by the official Madness site in 2004. The site stated that this song was recorded in early 1985 (during the Mad Not Mad sessions) with other tracks such as "Yesterday's Men". This brings into question whether some other tracks were also recorded before July 1986.

Miscellaneous tracks

No.	Title	Writer(s)	Length
1.	"Gabriel's Horn" (demo)	Cathal Smyth	3:47
2.	"Winter in Wonderland"	Graham McPherson	3:35
3.	"The Alligator Song" (a.k.a. "Alligator with a Stanley Knife")	Cathal Smyth	2:11
4.	"Ghost of Reverend Greene"	Lee Thompson	Unknown
5.	"The Harder They Come"	Jimmy Cliff	Unknown

Notes

1. The above songs may have (then) later become incorporated as part of the album, used as B-sides or later projects.
2. Track 1 Madness version did not transpire until the 1992 version of the CD single "House of Fun".
3. Tracks 2 and 3 were performed live in 1986 (where the track timings are taken from). No demos have surfaced.
4. The lyrics to track 2 were resurrected during 2000 on Cathal Smyth's band the Velvet Ghost website (now defunct).
5. The lyrics to track 4 were printed in the official MIS Nutty Boys fanzine XIV. No recorded version has ever surfaced.
6. Track 5 was performed live by Madness at Glastonbury in 1986. It was released as a single in 1992 recorded live from their re-union concert at Finsbury Park.

== Details of tracks subsequently re-recorded or re-worked by The Madness ==
As with numerous other groups (for example, the Beach Boys previously unreleased Smile and subsequent Smiley Smile albums), some tracks were eventually re-recorded or reworked onto succeeding releases by the Madness.

- "11th Hour" (Original 'Madness' demo version has not surfaced).
- "4BF" (Original 'Madness' demo version has not surfaced). A similar uptempo version was performed live on the 'Mad Not Mad' tour in late 1985. A re-recorded version was made available on the B-Side of "I Pronounce You" single. Only minimal changes were made to the structure and words of the song.
- "Be Good Boy" (Original 'Madness' instrumental synthesizer & drum machine demo has surfaced. It was also performed live in 1986). A re-recorded version was released on the B-Side of "What's That" single.
- "Remember the Day" (reworked / changed into "Nightmare Nightmare"). As no recorded version of this song has surfaced, comparisons cannot be made. However, guitarist Chris Foreman stated that the song was "changed because it was an African type thing, sort of bubbly. I really didn't like it so I worked the chords out like a reggae song. Suggs wrote some different lyrics [for it to become Nightmare Nightmare]"
- "Patience" (re-recorded instrumental version). Released on B-side of "I Pronounce You" single.

Additional tracks:

- "Winter in Wonderland" (dramatically reworked / changed to "In Wonder" with additional lyrics. The melodies within each song bear little resemblance to one another).
- "Gabriel's Horn" (both the song structure & the lyrics remained largely unaltered in the re-recorded version compared to the original).

According to John Reed, in his 2010 Madness biography House of Fun: The Story of Madness, "Song in Red" was originally another reworked Madness song.

== Personnel ==
=== Madness ===
- Suggs (Graham McPherson) – lead vocals
- Chris Foreman – guitars
- Mark Bedford (Bedders) – bass guitars
- Lee Thompson – saxophones
- Daniel Woodgate (Woody) – drums
- Chas Smash (Cathal Smyth) – backing vocals; lead vocals
- Seamus Beaghen – keyboards
