= Utter Madness =

1986 compilation album by Madness

Greatest hits album by Madness
- Released: 24 November 1986
- Recorded: 1982–1986
- Genres: Ska; new wave; soul; pop; calypso
- Length: 54:51
- Labels: Zarjazz; Virgin
- Producers: Clive Langer; Alan Winstanley

Madness chronology
The Peel Sessions (1986)	Utter Madness (1986)	The Madness (1988)

Singles from Utter Madness
- 1. "(Waiting For) The Ghost Train" Released: 27 October 1986

Utter Madness is a greatest hits album by the English pop and ska band Madness, released on their own Zarjazz label through Virgin Records on 24 November 1986 shortly after the group's original break-up. It picks up from where the band's first greatest hits album Complete Madness left off, running from "Driving in My Car" (the first single after Complete Madness's release) to the last Madness single before their break-up, "(Waiting For) The Ghost Train".

== Content ==
As with Complete Madness, the compilation includes a couple of album tracks that were never released as singles, namely "I'll Compete" and "Victoria Gardens". In the liner notes for Utter Madness the group's guitarist Chris Foreman revealed that "Victoria Gardens" was earmarked as a possible single, and it had been remixed and artwork done for the sleeve before "One Better Day" was chosen as the second single from the Keep Moving album instead, using the photograph originally taken for "Victoria Gardens" on its sleeve.

The album booklet also notably contains a photograph of all seven members of the original lineup of the band, including former keyboardist Mike Barson, his first appearance with the band in over 2 years. The setup of the photo also mirrored the band's album cover for their 1982 compilation Complete Madness.

"Seven Year Scratch", only available on the CD version of the album as a bonus track, is a vinyl remix featuring numerous Madness songs. Although this track features on other Madness compilations in edited form, this full length mix is only available on Utter Madness.

== Critical reception ==
Professional ratings
Review scores
Source	Rating
AllMusic	3/5 stars
Record Mirror	5/5 stars
Sounds	5/5 stars

Reviews of Utter Madness in the band's native UK were universally positive. In Melody Maker, Will Smith said, "Suffice to say, they leave a whole heap of fond memories and a mammoth void. They were a national bloody asset and they spoilt us rotten. Madness. Yesterday's men, tomorrow's inspiration." In NME, John McCready observed that in hindsight, previous studio album Mad Not Mad sounded like the end of the band, but that "Utter Madness isn't just an ending. It gives us a chance to look back to the time when Madness began to grow out of their bastard blue-beat shorts; to the times when the things they'd learned began to fall into place". He concluded, "Utter Madness is a very necessary compilation. It shows us that there is much to celebrate and precious little to complain about." John Barron of Sounds noted that while the front cover depicted the band in their "nutty train" formation, each member was also wearing newspaper print suits with the headline "Soweto Bloodbath" prominently displayed, stating that this demonstrated that to the end the group were masters of mixing humour with serious social comment: "Utter Madness is ample proof that their heavy heavy monster sound didn't so much dilute over the years as progress... Their particular genius lay in their ability to project their vision of our life and times in Britain through that normally most banal of mediums, pop music." Jane Wilkes of Record Mirror said that after the band's split "the release of a greatest hits album was inevitable, though necessary. Complete [Madness] appeared in what was still an initial burst of fervour. Utter is a far more concise and accurate reflection of their career, encompassing all their elements – the humour, the sadness and the cynicism."

== Track listing ==
1. "Our House" (Carl Smyth, Chris Foreman) – 3:25
2. "Driving in My Car" (Mike Barson) – 3:21
3. "Michael Caine" (Smyth, Dan Woodgate) – 3:40
4. "Wings of a Dove" (Smyth, Graham McPherson) – 3:03
5. "Yesterday's Men" (McPherson, Foreman) – 4:12
6. "Tomorrow's (Just Another Day)" (Smyth, Barson) – 3:12
7. "I'll Compete" (Lee Thompson, Woodgate) – 3:23
8. "(Waiting For) The Ghost Train" (McPherson) – 3:46
9. "Uncle Sam" (Foreman, Thompson) – 3:05
10. "The Sun and the Rain" (Barson) – 3:31
11. "Sweetest Girl" (Green Gartside) – 5:48 (4:20 on original 1986 release)
12. "One Better Day" (McPherson, Mark Bedford) – 4:07
13. "Victoria Gardens" (Smyth, Barson) – 4:34 (3:51 on original 1986 release)
14. "Seven Year Scratch" (CD only) (Madness, Cecil Campbell) – 8:38

The timings for each track were a few seconds shorter on the album's original release in 1986 as each track began over the fade-out of the previous one. The 2003 reissue restored each track to its full length with a short interval between tracks. When originally issued in 1986 the single version of "Sweetest Girl" and the remixed version of "Victoria Gardens" were used: these were replaced with the album versions when Utter Madness was remastered and reissued in 2003.

== Charts ==
Chart (1986)	Peak position
New Zealand Albums (RMNZ)	24
UK Albums (Official Charts)	29

== Certifications ==
Region	Certification	Certified units/sales
United Kingdom (BPI)	Gold	100,000^{^}
^{^} Shipments figures based on certification alone.
