= The Harder They Come (song) =

1972 single by Jimmy Cliff

- German vinyl single picture sleeve

Single by Jimmy Cliff

from the album The Harder They Come
- B-side: "Many Rivers to Cross" (release 1); "Trapped" (release 2)
- Released: 1972
- Genre: Reggae
- Length: 3:05
- Label: Island
- Songwriter: Jimmy Cliff
- Producer: Jimmy Cliff

Jimmy Cliff singles chronology
"Sitting in Limbo" (1972)	"The Harder They Come" (1972)	"Struggling Man" (1972)

"The Harder They Come" is a reggae song by the Jamaican singer Jimmy Cliff. It was first recorded for the soundtrack of the 1972 movie of the same name, in which it is supposed to have been written by the film's main character, Ivanhoe Martin.

"The Harder They Come" has been covered by many artists and was ranked number 350 on Rolling Stone magazine's list of "500 Greatest Songs of All Time".

== Jimmy Cliff recording ==
In 1969, singer Jimmy Cliff met film director Perry Henzell, who was intending to make a film about a musician who turned to crime. Cliff agreed to take the lead role, and the film was shot over the next two years. During filming, Cliff came up with the line "the harder they come". Henzell thought it would make a good title for the film, and asked Cliff to write and record a theme song for it.

The actual recording of the track, at Dynamic Sounds, was filmed for inclusion in the movie. Cliff wrote the melody, and improvised the lyrics. The musicians were Gladstone Anderson (piano), Winston Wright (organ), Winston Grennan (drums), Linford "Hux" Brown (lead guitar), Ranford "Ranny Bop" Williams (rhythm guitar), and Clifton "Jackie" Jackson (bass).

== Joe Jackson version ==
"The Harder They Come"

Single by Joe Jackson Band
- B-side: "Out of Style", "Tilt"
- Released: June 1980
- Genre: Reggae, rock
- Length: 3:50
- Label: A&M
- Songwriter: Jimmy Cliff
- Producer: Joe Jackson

Joe Jackson Band singles chronology
"Kinda Kute" (1980)	"The Harder They Come" (1980)	"Mad at You" (1980)

Joe Jackson recorded "The Harder They Come" with his band and released it as a single in 1980. It did not make an appearance in the UK singles chart, but did reach number 67 on the Record Business magazine's Singles Chart.

=== Track listing ===
Side one
No.	Title	Writer(s)	Length
1.	"The Harder They Come"	Jimmy Cliff	3:50

Side two
No.	Title	Writer(s)	Length
2.	"Out of Style"	Joe Jackson	2:55
3.	"Tilt"	Jackson	2:41

=== Charts ===
Chart (1980)	Peak position
Dutch GfK chart	34
Dutch Top 40	35
Swedish Singles Chart	18
UK The Singles Chart (Record Business)	67

== Rockers Revenge version ==
"The Harder They Come"

Single by Rockers Revenge featuring Donnie Calvin
- Released: 1983
- Genre: Electro
- Length: 3:37
- Label: London
- Songwriter: Jimmy Cliff
- Producer: Arthur Baker

"The Harder They Come" was recorded by the group Rockers Revenge in 1983 after their successful cover version of the Eddy Grant song "Walking On Sunshine" the previous year. The single peaked at number 13 in the US Dance Chart and at number 30 in the UK and Irish Singles Chart.

=== Chart performance ===
Chart (1983)	Peak position
US Billboard Club Play Singles	13
Irish Singles Chart	30
UK Singles Chart	30

== Madness version ==
"The Harder They Come"

Single by Madness

from the album Madstock!
- Released: 16 November 1992
- Recorded: 8 or 9 August 1992
- Venue: Finsbury Park
- Length: 3:27
- Label: Go! Discs
- Songwriter: Jimmy Cliff
- Producers: Clive Langer, Alan Winstanley

Madness singles chronology
"What's That" (1988)	"The Harder They Come" (1992)	"Lovestruck" (1999)

"The Harder They Come" was released as a single by English ska band Madness in November 1992 after a successful reunion concert held at London's Finsbury Park. The single was recorded live at the event along with its B-sides. Although in 1992 Madness had success with reissues of "It Must Be Love" and "My Girl", their version of "The Harder They Come" failed to make the top 40 in the UK Singles Chart, peaking at number 44.

However, this single was notable as Madness performed it on Top of the Pops from Red Square in Moscow, Russia by satellite, with bassist Mark Bedford and saxophonist Lee Thompson being absent from this performance.

=== Track listings ===
CD single 1
No.	Title	Writer(s)	Length
1.	"The Harder They Come"	Jimmy Cliff	3:27
2.	"Land of Hope and Glory" (live)	Chris Foreman, Lee Thompson	3:33
3.	"Tomorrow's (Just Another Day)" (live)	Mike Barson, Carl Smyth	3:23
4.	"Take It or Leave It" (live)	Barson, Thompson	3:51

CD single 2
No.	Title	Writer(s)	Length
1.	"The Harder They Come"	Cliff	3:27
2.	"Embarrassment" (live)	Barson, Thompson	3:12
3.	"Grey Day" (live)	Barson	4:53
4.	"Baggy Trousers" (live)	Graham McPherson, Foreman	2:42

=== Charts ===
Chart (1992)	Peak position
Australia (ARIA)	136
UK Singles (OCC)	44
