= What's That =

Single by The Madness

from the album The Madness
- B-side: "Be Good Boy"; "Flashings"
- Released: 16 May 1988
- Recorded: 1987
- Studio: Liquidator Studios (London)
- Genre: Pop
- Length: 3:34
- Label: Virgin
- Songwriter: Cathal Smyth (music/lyrics)
- Producer: The Three Eyes

The Madness singles chronology
"I Pronounce You" (1988)	"What's That" (1988)	"The Harder They Come" (1992)

Official audio
- "What's That" on YouTube

"What's That" is a single by the English band the Madness, the second from their 1988 eponymous studio album. It was released on 16 May 1988 in the UK only by Virgin Records on 7" and 12" vinyl, and also as a 10" vinyl picture disc.

The single was a commercial failure, peaking at No. 92 on the UK singles chart and lasting two weeks on the chart, dropping to No. 98 the following week after its debut. It was the first release by Madness or any of its spin-off bands not to reach the top 75 in the UK.

== Background ==
The music and the lyrics were written by Cathal Smyth in an attempt to emulate Bob Dylan's 1965 song "Subterranean Homesick Blues", with lyrics being about Smyth's state of mind at the time. It was the only song on the album to feature an actual drummer, Simon Philips, while the rest of the tracks used drum machines.

However, on release, the single proved commercially unsuccessful. As such, Virgin refused to finance a music video for the single, being the first time since 1979's "The Prince" that a Madness single was without a promotional video. This caused severe acrimony between the band and the label. While the band considered recording a follow-up to The Madness, Virgin instead demanded new demos with a month's time if the band were to stay on the label.

The band started to work on new songs, such as "Magic Carpet" (later used on the 1990 album Crunch!), but musical differences arose between the band once again, with these final sessions proving unsuccessful. As such, the band were dropped by Virgin and disbanded in over the summer.

== Critical reception ==
Upon its release, Lesley O'Toole of Record Mirror considered "What's That" to be so different from its predecessor "I Pronounce You" that it "might as well be the work of a different collective entirely". She concluded, "Jaunty nursery rhyme scansion meets rumbustious techno-noises in a characteristically off the wall offering." Jerry Smith of Music Week noted, "The revitalised Madness are having a few problems regaining the hit trail with their new, more reflective sound, but this moody number is real grower and could set them right." Ian Gittins of Melody Maker was critical, describing it as "a boring stick of nothing" and Madness "scrap[ing] the barrel". He wrote, "They open up like Raw Sex, bouncing a finger off a Hammond organ, then kind of... stay there, refusing all options open to them."

== Track listing ==
- 7"
1. "What's That" (Cathal Smyth) – 3:34
2. "Be Good Boy" (Lee Thompson, Chris Foreman) – 4:26
- 12"/CD
1. "What's That" (Smyth) – 3:34
2. "Be Good Boy" (Thompson, Foreman) – 4:26
3. "Flashings" (Smyth, Graham McPherson) – 3:21

There were also two 5" interlocking vinyl picture discs issued; one featured "Be Good Boy" on the B-side, the other "Flashings".
