= The Madness (The Madness album) =

1988 studio album by the Madness

Studio album by The Madness
- Released: 25 April 1988
- Recorded: March–November 1987
- Studios: Liquidator Studios, London
- Genres: Ska; pop rock; reggae
- Length: 43:15 (LP version); 58:16 (CD version)
- Label: Virgin
- Producer: The Three Eyes

The Madness chronology
Mad Not Mad (1985)	The Madness (1988)	Madstock! (1992)

Singles from The Madness
- 1. "I Pronounce You" Released: 7 March 1988; 2. "What's That" Released: 16 May 1988

The Madness is a studio album by English ska/pop band the Madness, which was a spinoff quartet of Madness consisting of Suggs, Carl Smyth, Chris Foreman, and Lee Thompson. It was originally released on April 25th, 1988 on Virgin Records.

With the demise of Madness and their own label Zarjazz, The Madness were directly recruited to Virgin. The album was recorded and self-produced by the group throughout 1987. When the album was released in late April 1988, it received dismissive reviews and peaked at No. 66 in the UK, lasting within the Top 100 for only one week. The Madness split up soon after the album's release.

Much like Mad Not Mad, the band hold negative views about the album. Thompson called it their "'Shitting Bricks' period" in reissued liner notes and Smyth said it was "not exactly a bright or clever move." In an interview with MOJO in March 2017, Suggs said, "[It was] a very tragic thing, and not something I'm proud of, at all. We should have knocked it on the head. It seemed like the last nail in the coffin. At the time you think, "This all seems perfectly reasonable!" Ha! But it wasn't."

== Background ==
"But the four of us who are continuing the band, I think we all feel that we're continuing Madness. Madness hasn't really ended yet. The name'll be different but... it can't sound that different because of the people writing the songs."

— Carl Smyth, NME, December 1986

After Madness's 1985 album Mad Not Mad, they attempted to record a new album, and eleven demo tracks were recorded. However, musical differences arose between band members, and in September 1986 the band announced that they were to split. Following the breakup of the original Madness, four of the original members (lead vocalist Suggs, saxophonist Lee Thompson, guitarist Chris Foreman and vocalist Cathal Smyth) continued working together. When originally trying to find a new name for the group, such titles as the Wasp Factory, the One, More and the Earthmen were considered, and at one point BBC Radio 1 listeners were even invited to write in with suggestions. Eventually, the band settled on the title of The Madness.

=== Production and recording ===
The album began with 32 songs and ideas, whittled down to 20 tracks, then tightened to the 15 that were released. Some of the songs that appeared on the album were re-recorded from the demos of the 1986 Madness sessions. In "I Pronounce You" the lyrics concern a bride's feelings on the eve of her arranged marriage. To add a Middle Eastern feel to the song, Foreman (in addition to his usual guitar) played sitar, an instrument he had used on previous Madness albums; the track also features tabla. The track "Song in Red" was reportedly written by Smyth about a cousin who died young. "Gabriel's Horn" was recorded in 1986 when the group were working on the never-completed Lost in the Museum album, and this demo version appeared as a track on the 1992 re-issue of the Madness single "House of Fun".

The band recorded The Madness at Liquidator Studios from March to November 1987; it was mixed at the Townhouse Studios in London. Liquidator Studios had been the band's own studio since 1983, located on Caledonian Road in north London, in what was once the premises of their fan club office. They built the 24-track professional studio in the basement; the first floor has always been an office and chill-out area, and there was a room upstairs for song mixing. They originally planned to produce the album by themselves, so the costs would be cheap. This initially worked until Virgin wanted control over the mixing, sending a producer that cost about £1,500 a day for over a week. The production was credited to "the Three Eyes", which was actually Suggs, Smyth, and Foreman, whilst Thompson was usually away skiing.

Unlike any previous Madness album, the lead vocals on The Madness were almost evenly shared between Suggs and Smyth. Suggs performed lead vocals on "In Wonder", "Nightmare Nightmare", "Thunder & Lightning", "Beat the Bride", "11th Hour", "Be Good Boy" and "4.B.F.", while Smyth sang on "Nail Down the Days", "What's That", "Song in Red", "Gabriel's Horn" and "Flashings". Both Smyth and Suggs performed lead vocals on "I Pronounce You" and "Oh". Smyth also wrote a majority of the album, writing five songs on his own and co-writing another three.

The new band did not include a bassist or drummer; guest musicians (mostly Bruce Thomas) played bass, while a drum machine was used in place of a live drummer on most tracks. UB40's Earl Falconer contributed bass to three tracks, and then Bruce Thomas (bass) and Steve Nieve (keyboards) from Elvis Costello's the Attractions were recruited. On "What's That", drummer Simon Philips added some brushes to help lend a jazzy feel, and also played on "Song In Red". Jerry Dammers (ex-the Specials) re-appeared to add keyboards to a couple of numbers, and the ska connection was further strengthened by ska band the Potato 5 who supplied the horn section.

In an interview for Guitarist & Scootering at the time of the release of "I Pronounce You", Foreman described the new album as "brilliant". Foreman added "Some of it is very recognizably us and some of it isn't. Carl has doing a lot of singing. He's been doing a lot of writing as well, he's written well over half the album as well, which is good because he's always got loads of ideas for songs and it's good to get them out of him. When we were doing the album, Suggs and myself programmed all the drum machines. But it's sort of done me out of a job really, because I used to write the tunes and they'd write the lyrics, but now they're writing their own tunes and their own lyrics, so I'm redundant." Speaking of trying to become a more serious band, Foreman used the "I Pronounce You" video as an example, stating "We are what we are really. On the one video we've just done we tried to be serious, but Lee's got a Mohican haircut and in a bit of it we dyed his face red and things like that, so it hard to be... we don't want to be a serious, cheeks sucked-in arty farty band, but the subject matter of a lot of our songs has always been serious."

The band were pleased with the album upon completion as it took a long time to complete and for the first time in their career they worked without the Clive Langer/Alan Winstanley production team, choosing instead to produce it themselves.

=== Aborted second album and breakup ===
The Madness' existence was revealed to the public at the start of 1988. Leading up to the release of their album in April, the band saw their debut album as only the start of a new beginning, with the members being very optimistic about the future. They were even considering a set of live dates to play for a summer tour. However, due to the lack of commercial success from the album and singles, plans for a tour were abandoned. Virgin Records' lack of faith in the band also became increasingly evident, notably when they refused to do a music video for "What's That?", which caused significant acrimony between the band and label.

While the band opted to work on another album, Virgin instead demanded that unless they come up with some new demos within a month, they would be dropped by the label. They then started writing and rehearsing some new songs. Notably, one of these last songs written was "Magic Carpet", later used by Thompson and Foreman's spin-off band's debut album, Crunch!. According to Foreman, the rest of the material written for the intended follow-up to The Madness were eventually used as Madness B-sides. However, these last sessions ultimately proved unsuccessful, with musical differences arising between the band members. Chris wanted to further use technology in their songs, Carl wanted to record with a live band, while Thompson usually wasn't present.

Meanwhile, Suggs was unsure of the direction of the band. He had wanted to leave for a while, and had saw Virgin's ultimatum as a way out. And during the last session, Suggs told the band that he wanted to end the project, and nobody objected. As such, The Madness let their contract with Virgin expire and quietly dissolved in the summer of 1988. Suggs talked about the split in an interview with Melody Maker in July 1989:

"It seemed like a good time to take a break from the band. About a year ago, Madness made an album for Virgin. They wanted us to do some demos before we did the next album, and that didn't make us much feel like doing it. Having gone all the way, only for them to ask us to do demos...It was a timely moment to give it a rest."

After the band's breakup, the members pursued different careers. Lee & Chris continued performing as The Nutty Boys, Carl became the Head of A&R at Go! Discs, and Suggs pursued television presenting, acting, and became the producer and co-manager for Liverpool band The Farm. Madness reformed with its original members for a reunion tour in 1992 and they have remained together since, playing live and recording new material.

== Cover artwork ==
The album's sleeve was designed by Dave Gibbons and Rian Hughes. On the rear sleeve, each song listed was accompanied with a small drawing in similar style to the album's cover – resembling a face. Both "I Pronounce You" and "What's That" featured their own drawing as the main sleeve design when they were issued as singles. The album was respectfully dedicated to the memory of Roy Davies (1940–1987), who played keyboards on the Mad Not Mad album as well as The Madness, on the song "I Pronounce You".

== Release ==
The album was originally issued on CD and vinyl LP via Virgin Records in the UK and Europe, including France, Germany, Italy and Spain. On 21 July 1988 a CD edition was also issued in Japan. Since its initial release, the album has remained out-of-print on CD and today second-hand copies are often listed for sale for £50 or more.

The vinyl version of the album featured ten tracks, however the CD edition added four other tracks; "11th Hour", "Be Good Boy", "Flashings" and "4.B.F." However, there was one remaining track released by the group that did not appear on the CD edition; an instrumental track titled "Patience". This was the B-side to the "I Pronounce You" single. A vocal version of the song later appeared on the unofficial Madness release The Lost Album. Also included on The Lost Album were demo versions of "What's That" and "Beat the Bride".

Beginning in 2009, Madness albums were remastered and expanded via Union Square Music and Salvo. All of the band's original albums were released in this series by Union Square Music/Salvo, except for the Mad Not Mad album which was released by Virgin Records as a remastered and expanded edition in 2010. Each Union Square Music/Salvo release contained a page of Madness albums soon to be made available as part of the series. The Madness was listed as one of these upcoming releases, however as of 2017 this remains the only Madness album not to receive such a release. In late 2012, as part of the Ask Chris Foreman (Chrissy Boy) section on Madness' official website, one fan asked about the remastered version of the album and if it was due for release as promised. Foreman responded "I am not sure if we own the rights to that album."

== Promotion ==
Upon release, the "I Pronounce You" single had a music video created to promote it. It later appeared as part of the 1992 VHS compilation Divine Madness, which was later issued on DVD in 2002 and as a CD+DVD set in 2005. "What's That" had no video, as Virgin Records chose not to commission one.

In promoting to the album and lead single, the one and only TV appearance of The Madness was on Friday Night Live, a cult late-night comedy show hosted by Ben Elton. On the show the band performed "I Pronounce You" and the album track "Beat the Bride". On the show, John Hasler, the ex-Madness drummer and manager, helped out on drums. He also appeared on the drums in the "I Pronounce You" music video. During the performance, the band initially stressed that they were not "the Nutty Boys" the public knew and loved, as they attempted to become a more serious group.

In January 1989, months after The Madness split, an impostor claiming to be Suggs kept phoning various radios and studios to promote band activity, such as phoning Bruno Brookes to announce a forthcoming album, single, tour, film, and T-shirt, or phoning to promote a one-off gig in Newcastle. Suggs denounced the rumours, confirming that The Madness were not active by that point.

== Critical reception ==
Professional ratings
Review scores
Source	Rating
AllMusic	2/5 stars
Number One	3/5 stars
Smash Hits	6/10 stars
Record Mirror	2.5/5 stars

Upon release, the album received mixed-to-negative reviews, with Tony Beard of Record Mirror calling it "the schoolboy struggles of a band emerging into maturity." Graeme Kay of Smash Hits described the album as "something of a hit and miss affair". He highlighted the tracks "Nail Down the Days", "What's That" and "Beat the Bride", but felt "the rest of the LP tries too hard to be clever". He concluded: "Not a great LP by any means, but not bad". Max Bell of Number One wrote: "Songwise, the Camden crooners continue to delve into sombre waters. The Madness is still reminiscent of a nightmare in a funfair on occasions but it's that very stylised sound which makes the Mad ones matter."

Darryl Cater of AllMusic retrospectively stated: "The tinny, muddled pop sound proves what a big contribution producers Clive Langer and Alan Winstanley had made to the polished, resonant Madness records. There are flashes of trademark Madness melody, but too much of the album is an indistinguishable blur of drum machines, keyboards and '80s pop guitar. Exceptions include the reggae-flavoured "Beat the Bride" and the sitar-savvy single "I Pronounce You." These former British skinheads have always been better at the wacky than the meaningful, and the lyrical emphasis on social issues feels strained."

== Track listing ==
Side one
No.	Title	Writer(s)	Lead vocals	Length
1.	"Nail Down the Days"	Cathal Smyth	Smyth	4:34
2.	"What's That"	Smyth	Smyth	3:34
3.	"I Pronounce You"	Lee Thompson; Smyth	Smyth and Suggs	4:38
4.	"Oh"	Smyth	Smyth and Suggs	3:57
5.	"In Wonder"	Graham McPherson	Suggs	4:58

Side two
No.	Title	Writer(s)	Lead vocals	Length
6.	"Song in Red"	Smyth	Smyth	3:39
7.	"Nightmare Nightmare"	McPherson	Suggs	4:30
8.	"Thunder and Lightning"	McPherson; Chris Foreman	Suggs	3:13
9.	"Beat the Bride"	Thompson; Smyth	Suggs	3:57
10.	"Gabriel's Horn"	Smyth	Smyth	6:15

Bonus tracks on compact disc release
No.	Title	Writer(s)	Lead vocals	Length
11.	"11th Hour" (also on "I Pronounce You" 12")	McPherson; Foreman	Suggs	4:31
12.	"Be Good Boy" (also on "What's That" 7" and 12")	Thompson; Foreman	Suggs	4:26
13.	"Flashings" (also on "What's That" 12")	Smyth; McPherson	Smyth	3:21
14.	"4 B.F." (also on "I Pronounce You" 12")	Thompson	Suggs	2:54

== Chart performance ==
Chart (1988)	Peak position	Total weeks
UK Albums Chart	65	1

When the album was released in late April 1988, it received dismissive reviews and peaked at No. 66 in the UK, lasting within the Top 100 for only one week. Two singles, "I Pronounce You" and "What's That", were released from the album, although like the album these were less successful than the original band releases.

"I Pronounce You" was the lead single, released in the UK and Portugal. Receiving lukewarm reception from the music press, it peaked at No. 44 in the UK, lasting on the charts for four weeks after originally debuting at No. 48.

"What's That", the album's second and final single, was released in the UK only. It was the first release by Madness or any of its spin-off bands not to reach the Top 75 in the UK. It peaked at No. 92 and lasted two weeks on the chart, dropping to No. 98 the following week after its debut.

== Personnel ==
Credits are adapted from the album's liner notes.

The Madness

- Graham "Suggs" McPherson – lead vocals (3–5, 7–9, 11, 12, 14), backing vocals (1, 2, 7, 13), piano (9, 13), timbales (9), bongos (14)
- Cathal Smyth – lead vocals (1–4, 6, 10, 13), backing vocals (7, 9, 11, 14), acoustic guitar (3), keyboards (1)
- Chris Foreman – guitar (1–12, 14), sitar (3), synthaxe (5), piano solo (9), synthesizer effects (14)
- Lee Thompson – saxophones (1, 4–12, 14), flute (3), backing vocals (3)

Additional musicians

- Steve Nieve – keyboards (1, 2, 4, 5, 12, 14), piano (6, 8)
- Roy Davies – keyboards (3)
- Ian Prince – Hammond organ (7), piano solo (7), piano (10), synthesizer (10)
- Jerry Dammers – piano (7), electronic organ (7), Hammond organ (9), hi hat (9)
- Seamus Beaghen – accordion (4), keyboards (8, 11), Hammond organ (6, 8)
- Bruce Thomas – bass guitar (1, 2, 4–6, 8, 13)
- Earl Falconer – bass guitar (7, 9, 10)
- Big George Webley – bass guitar (12, 14)
- Scotty – bass guitar (3)
- Simon Phillips – drums (2, 6)
- Esmail Sheikh – tablas (3)
- Dick Cuthell – horns (7, 9, 10), cowbell (9)
- Rick Walker – tenor saxophone (1, 2, 13)
- Andy Minnion – baritone saxophone (1, 2, 13)
- Malcolm Buck – tenor saxophone (1, 2, 13)
- Simon Driscoll – trombone (1, 2, 13)
- Lorenzo Hall – backing vocals (8, 11, 12)
- Anthony Lee Brian – backing vocals (8, 11, 12)
- Robbie Ellington – backing vocals (8, 11, 12)

Technical

- The Three Eyes (Suggs, Cathal, Chris) – production
- Steve Chase – co-production; engineer, mixing
- Nick Froome – engineer
- Hugh Padgham – mixing
- Michael H. Brauer – mixing
- Dave Gibbons – sleeve
- Rian Hughes – sleeve
