= Madness (band) =

British ska band

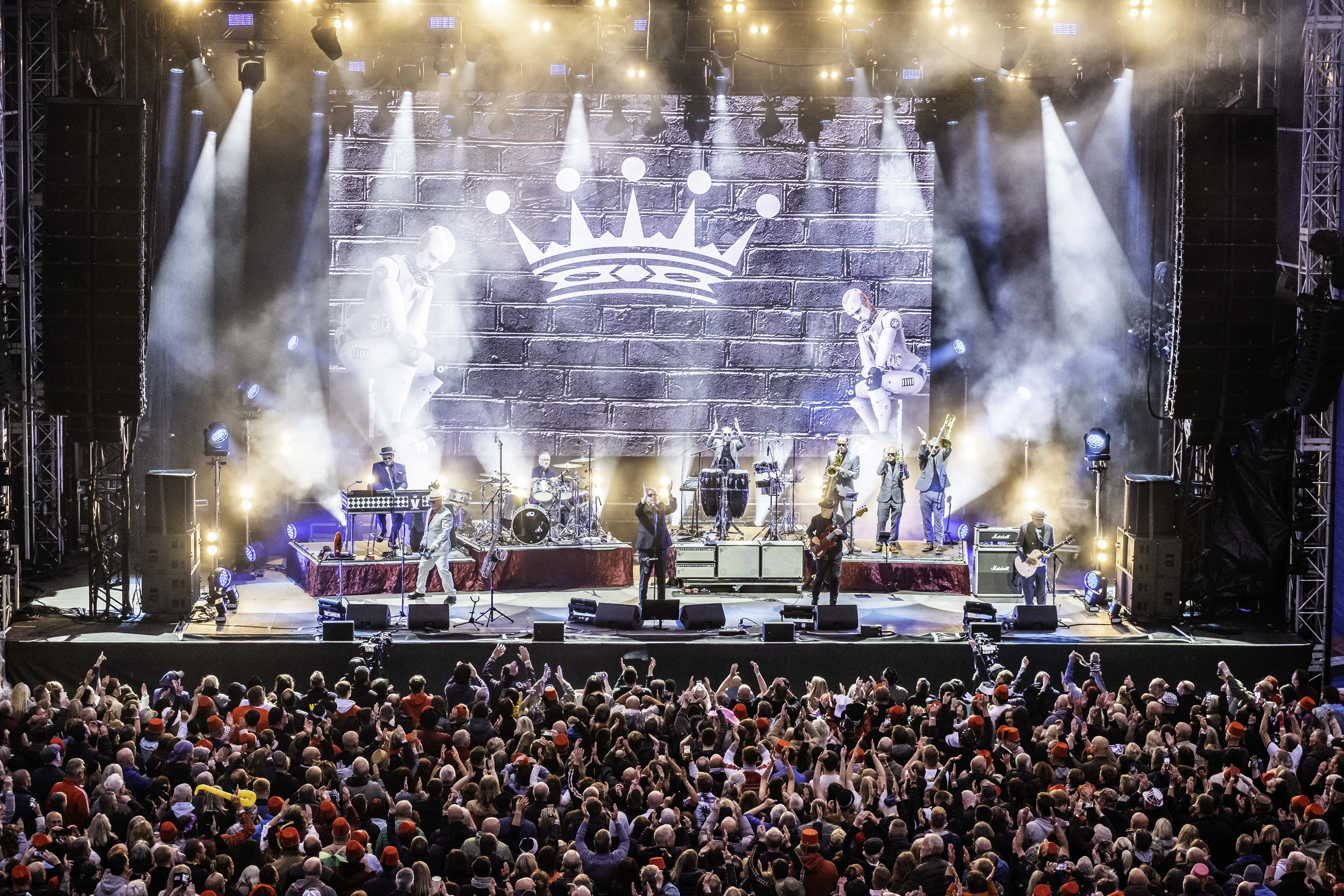
- Madness performing in 2024

Background information
- Origin: Camden Town, London, England
- Genres: Two-tone; ska; pop; new wave; rocksteady
- Years active: 1976–1986; 1992–present
- Spinoffs: The Madness; The Fink Brothers; The Nutty Boys; Crunch!
- Members: Chris Foreman; Mike Barson; Lee Thompson; Graham "Suggs" McPherson; Dan Woodgate; Mark Bedford
- Past members: Cathal "Chas Smash" Smyth; John Hasler; Dikran Tulaine; Gavin Rodgers; Garry Dovey
- Website: madness.co.uk

Madness are an English ska and pop band from Camden Town, north-west London, who formed in 1976. One of the most prominent bands of the late-1970s/early-1980s two-tone ska revival, they continue to perform with six of the seven members of their original line-up. Madness's most successful period was from 1980 to 1986, when the band's songs spent a total of 214 weeks on the UK singles chart, jointly holding the record with English reggae group UB40 for most weeks spent by a group in the UK singles chart during the 1980s.

Madness have had 16 singles reach the UK top ten, including "One Step Beyond", "Baggy Trousers" and "It Must Be Love"; one UK number-one single, "House of Fun"; and two number ones in Ireland, "House of Fun" and "Wings of a Dove". "Our House" was their biggest US hit, reaching number 7 on the Billboard Hot 100. In 2000, the band received the Ivor Novello Award from the British Academy of Songwriters, Composers and Authors for Outstanding Song Collection.

== Career ==
=== 1976–1978: Formation ===
The core of the band formed as the North London Invaders in 1976, and included Mike Barson (Monsieur Barso) on keyboards, Chris Foreman (Chrissy Boy) on guitar and Lee Thompson (Kix) on saxophone. They later recruited John Hasler on drums and Cathal Smyth (better known as Chas Smash) on bass guitar. Later that year they were joined by lead vocalist Dikran Tulaine.

This six-piece line-up lasted until partway through 1977, when Graham McPherson (better known as Suggs) took over the lead vocals after seeing the band perform in a friend's garden. Tulaine went on to be an actor. Smyth, who left after an argument with Barson, was replaced with Gavin Rodgers, Barson's girlfriend's brother. McPherson was kicked out of the band by Barson for choosing too often to watch Chelsea instead of rehearsing. Thompson left the band after Barson criticised his saxophone playing.

By 1978, the band had allowed McPherson to return as a vocalist after he had filled in temporarily for Hasler (who had taken over vocals when McPherson was removed). Thompson returned after patching things up with Barson. Drummer Dan Woodgate (Woody) and bassist Mark Bedford (Bedders) also joined the band, replacing Garry Dovey and Rodgers, respectively, the latter of whom left due to his lack of faith in the band and their organisation. After briefly changing their name to Morris and the Minors, in 1979 the band renamed themselves as Madness, paying homage to one of their favourite songs by ska and reggae artist Prince Buster. The band remained a sextet until late 1979, when Chas Smash rejoined and officially became the seventh member of Madness as a backing vocalist and dancer.

=== 1979–1981: Early success ===
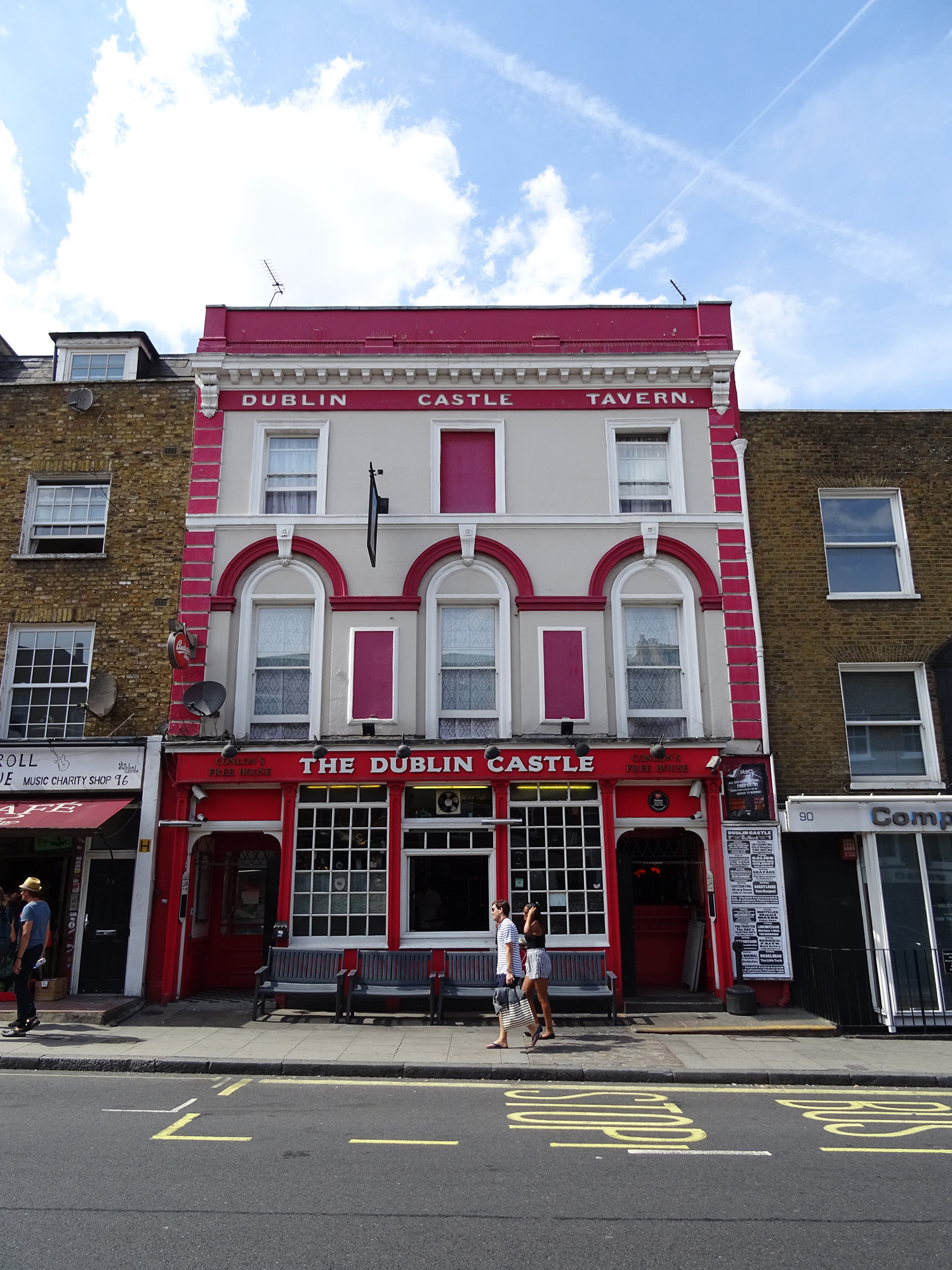
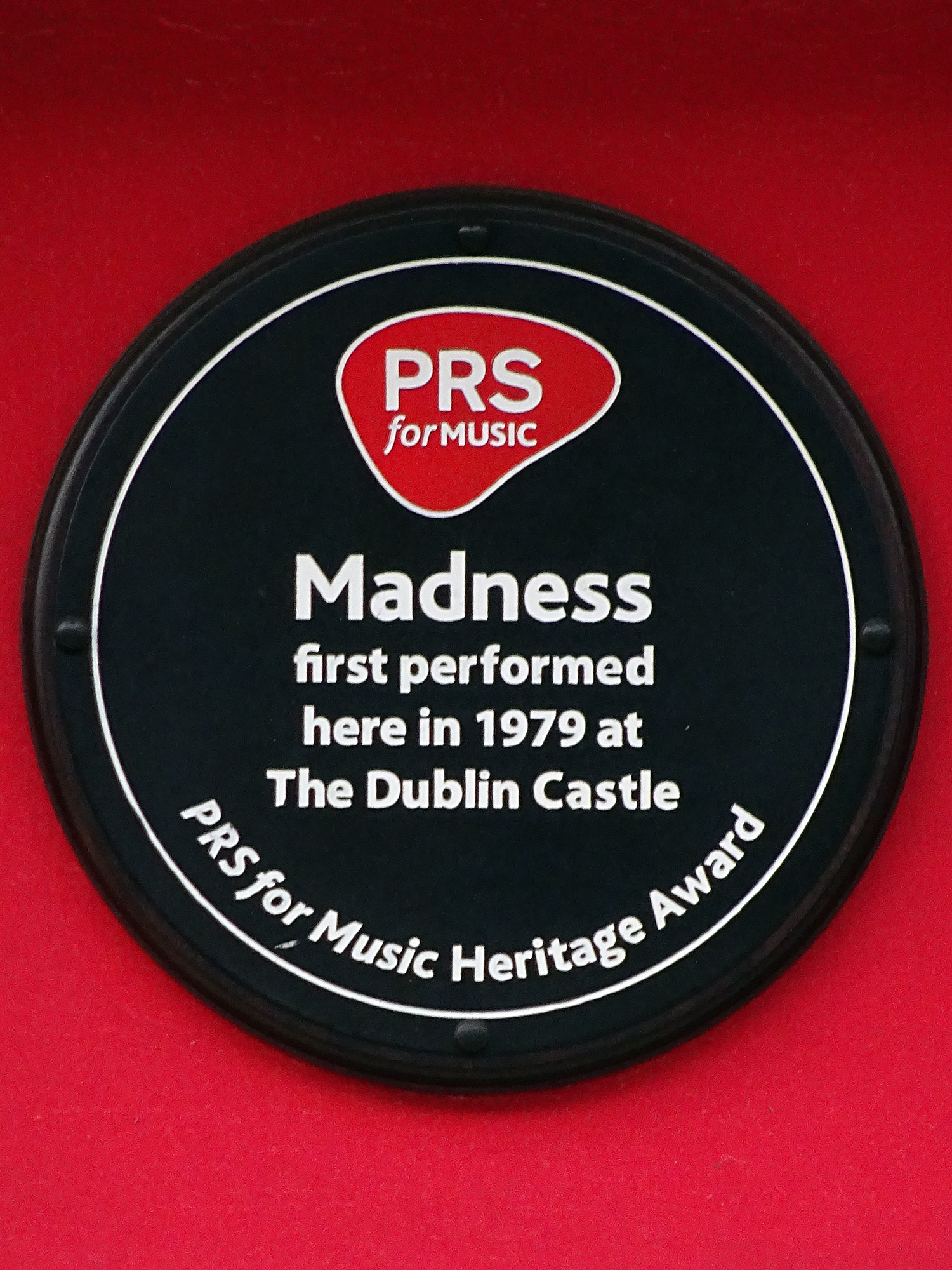
Dublin Castle pub at 94 Parkway, Camden Town, London, with a close-up of the commemorative PRS plaque on the wall

During 1979, the band began to attract a live following in London, being regulars at the Dublin Castle in Camden Town. The band's first commercial recording was the Lee Thompson composition "The Prince". The song, like the band's name, paid homage to their idol, Prince Buster. The song was released through 2 Tone Records, the label of the Specials founder and keyboardist Jerry Dammers. The song was a surprise hit, peaking in the UK music charts at number 16. Madness toured with fellow 2 Tone bands the Specials and the Selecter, before recording their debut studio album.

That debut studio album, One Step Beyond... was released by Stiff Records. The album included a re-recording of "The Prince" and its B-side "Madness", and the band's second and third singles: "One Step Beyond" and "My Girl". The title song was a cover of the B-side of the 1960s Prince Buster hit "Al Capone". The One Step Beyond... album stayed in the British charts for 78 weeks, peaking at number 2. Smyth performed on the album but was not an official member of the band at the time of the album's recording or release. He formally joined Madness a few weeks after One Step Beyond... was issued in October 1979.

After the release of "My Girl", the band felt that they had exhausted the material from One Step Beyond..., and did not want to release any more singles from the album. However, Dave Robinson, head of Stiff Records, disagreed. Eventually, a compromise was made, and the band decided to release an EP featuring one album track and three new tracks. The result was the Work Rest and Play EP, which was headlined by the song "Night Boat to Cairo", from the One Step Beyond album. The EP reached number 6 in the UK Singles Chart.

In 1980, the band's second studio album, Absolutely, reached number 2 on the UK Albums Chart. Absolutely spawned some of the band's biggest hits, most notably "Baggy Trousers", which peaked at number 3 in the UK Singles Chart. "Embarrassment" reached number 4 in the charts, and the instrumental song "The Return of the Los Palmas 7" climbed to number 7. Although the album reviews were generally less enthusiastic than those of One Step Beyond..., they were mostly positive. Robert Christgau gave the album a favourable B− grade, but Rolling Stone awarded the album just one out of five stars. Rolling Stone was particularly scathing of the ska revival in general, stating that "The Specials wasn't very good" and Madness were simply "the Blues Brothers with English accents".

A drama-documentary film titled Take It or Leave It was released in 1981, featuring the band members playing themselves in a re-creation of their early days to the then-current period. Live recordings of Madness performances as well as those by other 2 Tone bands were used in the 1981 documentary film and soundtrack album Dance Craze.

=== 1981–1983: Change of direction ===
In 1981, the band's third studio album, 7, reached number 5 in the UK Albums Chart and contained three hit singles: "Grey Day" (no. 4, April 1981), "Shut Up" (no. 7, September 1981), and "Cardiac Arrest" (no. 14, February 1982). In an article in 1979, Chris Foreman explained that the band's music would move with the times, and change styles as time goes on. This was shown to be the case, as unlike the two ska-filled, fast-paced albums that preceded it, 7 was something of a change in direction. Suggs' vocal performance changed significantly, and his strong accent from the previous studio albums had been watered down. The album strayed from the ska-influenced sound of One Step Beyond... and Absolutely and moved towards a pop sound; a trend that continued with subsequent studio albums.

Near the end of 1981, Madness released one of their most recognised songs: a cover of Labi Siffre's 1971 hit "It Must Be Love". The song climbed to number 4 in the UK, and in 1983, the song peaked at number 33 in the US charts. In 1982, Madness released their only number 1 hit to date, "House of Fun" and also reached number 1 in the album charts with their first compilation, Complete Madness (1982). In this period, the band starred in a series of commercials in Japan for the Honda City hatchback and Honda Motocompo scooter, in which they sang the original composition "In the City" and a modified version of their 1982 single "Driving in My Car"; a full version of "In the City" was released on Complete Madness.

In November 1982, they released their fourth studio album, The Rise & Fall, which was well received in the UK, but did not get an American release. Instead, many of its songs were included on the US compilation Madness (1983), including "Our House", which was their most internationally successful single to date. "Our House" reached number 5 in the UK music charts and number 7 in the US charts; it was also performed on The Young Ones. Many reviewers compared The Rise & Fall to the Kinks' The Village Green Preservation Society (1968), and it is at times retrospectively considered a concept album. The album also featured "Primrose Hill", which was more similar to the Beatles song "Strawberry Fields Forever", containing similar psychedelic imagery and a layered arrangement.

=== 1983–1986: Decline and break-up ===
In 1983, their single "Wings of a Dove" peaked at number 2 in the UK charts, followed by "The Sun and the Rain" (no. 5, November 1983). Their following studio album, Keep Moving, peaked at number 6 in the UK Albums Chart, and two singles from that album reached the top 20 in the UK Singles Chart. The album received some good reviews, with Rolling Stone magazine giving the album four out of five stars, applauding the band's changing sound. This was an improvement as the last album reviewed by the magazine, Absolutely, was heavily criticised.

==== Mike Barson's Departure ====
"Mike Barson has decided to retire from Madness and the wonderful world of pop music. The mild mannered foundation stone will be sorely missed by Madness with sadness."

— "Barson Cops Out", Press Statement for Record Mirror, January 14 1984.

As the musical lynchpin of the band, keyboardist Mike Barson had become increasingly exhausted by the pressure of being in the band by this time. This sentiment started in late 1982 during the production of The Rise and Fall, during which Barson moved to Amsterdam with his wife. Barson also became very reclusive from the band's public image and started to cover his face in photographs. Additionally, while rehearsing songs for Keep Moving, Barson disappeared on a holiday throughout Europe in a camper van with his wife and dog throughout the summer of 1983. This held up the release of "Wings Of A Dove" and fueled rumours that he was planning on leaving the band. He then returned in August before the band filmed the music video for the single.

Later on, on the 4th of October, the band were rehearsing and discussing a possible television series, which was being written for them by Ben Elton and Richard Curtis. Barson then informed the band that he would not be able to take part because he intended to leave the band, as he was tired of the music business and wanted to spend more time with his wife. He had already told their manager, Matthew Sztumpf, of his intent to leave after the band's tour in America in September.

He agreed to finish recording the album Keep Moving and various commitments with the band until the end of the year, and left after playing live for the last time with the band at the Lyceum Ballroom on 21 December 1983. Barson's departure from Madness was made public in January 1984. After leaving the band, Barson returned to the UK for the filming of two music videos as he had played on the tracks, "Michael Caine" and "One Better Day".

James Mackie took Barson's place, appearing with Madness on the US television show Saturday Night Live on 14 April 1984. Paul Carrack took Barson's place whilst the band toured America in early 1984. The six remaining members left Stiff Records and formed their own label, Zarjazz Records, which was a sub-label of Virgin Records.

==== Post-Stiff ====
In 1985, the label released the band's sixth studio album, Mad Not Mad. Barson's usual keyboard parts were filled by an emphasis on synthesisers provided by Steve Nieve of the Attractions. In later years, frontman Suggs has described the album as a "polished turd". The album reached number 16 in the UK charts, which is the band's lowest position on the album charts to date. Despite the poor chart showing, the album was listed as number 55 in NME's "All Time 100 Albums". The singles for the album fared even worse, with "Yesterday's Men" peaking at number 18 in the UK charts. The subsequent singles, "Uncle Sam" and "Sweetest Girl", failed to make the top 20, which was a first for Madness singles.

In July 1986, returning from tours across America and Europe, the band attempted to record a new studio album, and 11 demo tracks were recorded. However, musical differences arose between the band members. The untitled album went unreleased, and in September 1986, the band announced that they were to break up. Barson rejoined the band for a farewell single, "(Waiting For) The Ghost Train", but did not appear in the music video. Following the release of the single, which reached a high of number 18 in the UK, and the release of their second compilation album, Utter Madness, which reached a high of number 29, the band broke up.

=== 1987–1991: Interim period ===
==== The Madness spin-off ====
After the split, four members of the band – Suggs, Carl Smyth, Lee Thompson and Chris Foreman – regrouped at the start of 1987. Signing directly to Virgin Records, they then spent the year recording and producing an album at Liquidator Studios, which Madness still owned. After the album was finished, the group settled on the name, The Madness, having tried several different bandnames, such as The Wasp Factory, Earthmen, and More. In April 1988, they released their eponymous debut album, The Madness, and released two singles, "I Pronounce You", and "What's That". Despite initial optimism about their future and potential live dates for the summer, their releases were commercial failures, with the album only charting at No. 65 in the UK for one week and neither of the singles reaching the top 40, resulting in potential tour plans being abandoned. The band's relations with their label, Virgin Records, were also souring, with Virgin demanding demos for the follow-up album if the band were to stay on the label. As such, the band quietly broke up over the summer of 1988.

"After The Madness, Suggs, Cathal, Lee and I kind of scattered. Lee and I formed a band, The Nutty Boys, and went off on all sorts of adventures, and released an album, Crunch!. Suggs had a solo career. Cathal was working at Go! Discs as an A&R man - he used to come and see Lee and I, but he never signed us up! Bedders and Woody were in Voice Of The Beehive. I never in my wildest dreams thought that Madness would reform."

— Chris Foreman, Wonderful Liner Notes

==== Individual projects ====
Meanwhile, Woodgate found success as the drummer for the band Voice of the Beehive, who had several UK hit singles such as "Don't Call Me Baby", "I Say Nothing", and "Monsters and Angels". Mark Bedford also joined the band alongside Woodgate in its formative stages, but left to study graphic design at the London College of Printing. He remained partially active in the music business, collaborating with Terry Edwards to form the jazz outfit BUtterfield 8 in 1988, as well as playing bass guitar on Morrissey's second solo album Kill Uncle, released in 1991. Thompson and Foreman formed a ska band called The Nutty Boys and released an album Crunch! in 1990. With the album having modest critical and commercial success, they regularly played the pub circuit in London and toured throughout Europe. Some members of Madness, such as Suggs, Carl, Barson, and Bedford, attended their early gigs between 1990 and 1991.

After the split of The Madness, Carl initially tried to start his own band and a publishing company with former bandmate John Hasler. Later, after a period of inactivity, Carl became more involved in the industry side of the music business, becoming an A&R executive for Go! Discs in 1989. During his tenure he signed The Stairs, and worked with The Beautiful South, Paul Weller, and The La's. He also developed a close friendship with Morrissey at that time and introduced Boz Boorer to him, who continued to work with Morrissey for the next three decades. Morrissey even asked Carl to manage him, but he declined the offer. He instead provided backing vocals on Morrissey's cover of The Jam's song "That's Entertainment", which was a B-side for the single "Sing Your Life" (1991).

However, Suggs had difficulty figuring out his life as he initially struggled with paranoia and a breakdown after the split. He was very worried about how he would provide for his family, which caused him to start taking ecstasy and seeing a therapist. Eventually, Suggs started pursuing various endeavours, including acting in The Press Gang, the 1990 indie film The Final Frame, and the 1989 film The Tall Guy. He also tried stand-up comedy for a short period in the summer of 1989, but he was unsuccessful in that field. He also became a TV presenter on the BSB Power Station, hosting his own show Suggs On Saturday from 1990 to 1991. Suggs then became the co-manager and producer for The Farm from 1990 to 1992, producing their 1991 No. 1 album Spartacus, as well their Top 10 UK Hit Singles, "Groovy Train" (1990) and "All Together Now" (1990). Suggs also collaborated with Morrissey, providing backing vocals on some of his singles, such as "Piccadilly Palare" (1990) and "Sing Your Life" (1991).

Throughout this period, the members of the band still stayed in touch and worked together. Thompson, Bedford, and Foreman started playing together in Terry Edward's All Stars in early 1992. Mike Barson, who was still retired in Amsterdam, regularly wrote and produced songs with Lee Thompson and Suggs, who came to visit him; many of these appeared on subsequent Madness albums and on Suggs's 1995 debut solo album The Lone Ranger. Carl also regularly visited Lee and Chris's band The Nutty Boys at gigs and at Liquidator Studios when they were working on Crunch!. Carl also visited Suggs and The Farm at Mayfair Studios during their recording of "All Together Now", and tried to poach the band for Go! Discs, but the band refused to sign to the label.

After the limited release of the compilation albums It's... Madness (1990) and It's... Madness Too (1991), supervised by Foreman, which both found surprising commercial success, the discussion of the potential release of a greatest hits album emerged from Virgin Records. As such, the entire band started keeping in contact with each other regularly again through Carl, who spawned the idea of promoting the greatest hits album and ultimately initiated their comeback, which prompted rumours of a Madness reformation by late 1991.

=== 1992–2003: Reunion and Our House musical ===
In February 1992, "It Must Be Love" was re-released and eventually reached number 6 in the UK Singles Chart in March. Following that, the singles compilation album Divine Madness (1992) was released and peaked at number 1 in the album charts. Madness then announced plans for a reunion concert, Madstock!, which was held at Finsbury Park, London on 8 and 9 August of that year. The original line-up reunited, performing together for the first time since Barson left the band in 1984. Over 75,000 fans attended the weekend festival, and the dancing of the crowd caused some nearby tower blocks to shake perceptibly as they resonated with the frequency of the music.

However, Morrissey's set as a supporting act drew controversy as he came on with a Union Jack and performed in front of a skinhead backdrop. This was met with negative reception and heckling by the audience, who threw various things at the stage, causing him and his band to walk off after only nine songs. The band members had various reactions, but most were unsympathetic to Morrissey, with even Smyth stating in a 1993 interview, "He's a friend of ours and I thought he was good for the bill but he chose to present himself a certain way and he has to live with that."

After the Finsbury Park comeback, a live album was released, and the associated single, "The Harder They Come" (a cover of Jimmy Cliff's 1973 song) reached number 44 in the UK, with the album reaching number 22.

The band continued to reunite for annual UK Christmas season tours (in 1992, 1993, and 1995) and held three more Madstock! festivals; in 1994, 1996 and 1998. Also in 1998, Madness returned to America for their first tour there since 1984. The live album Universal Madness was recorded at the Universal Amphitheatre in L.A. and released the following year. In 1999, Madness released their first studio album since 1986, entitled Wonderful. The album reached number 17 in the UK Albums Chart, and the lead single, "Lovestruck", gave the band their first new top 10 hit in the UK since 1983. Neither of the two subsequent singles from the album, "Johnny the Horse" and "Drip Fed Fred" (featuring Ian Dury on vocals), entered the top 40 of the UK chart.

From 28 October 2002 to 16 August 2003, a musical based on Madness songs, Our House, ran at the Cambridge Theatre in London. Madness played a role in the executive production of the show, and Suggs played a role in the production for a period, playing the central character's father. It won an Olivier Award for best new musical of 2003, and the performance was released on DVD on 1 November 2004. There was also a previous musical based on Madness songs, One Step Beyond!, written by Alan Gilbey. The musical had a brief run at the Theatre Royal Stratford East in 1993 and a run at Putney Arts Theatre, London in 2012.

=== 2004–2010: The Dangermen and The Liberty of Norton Folgate ===
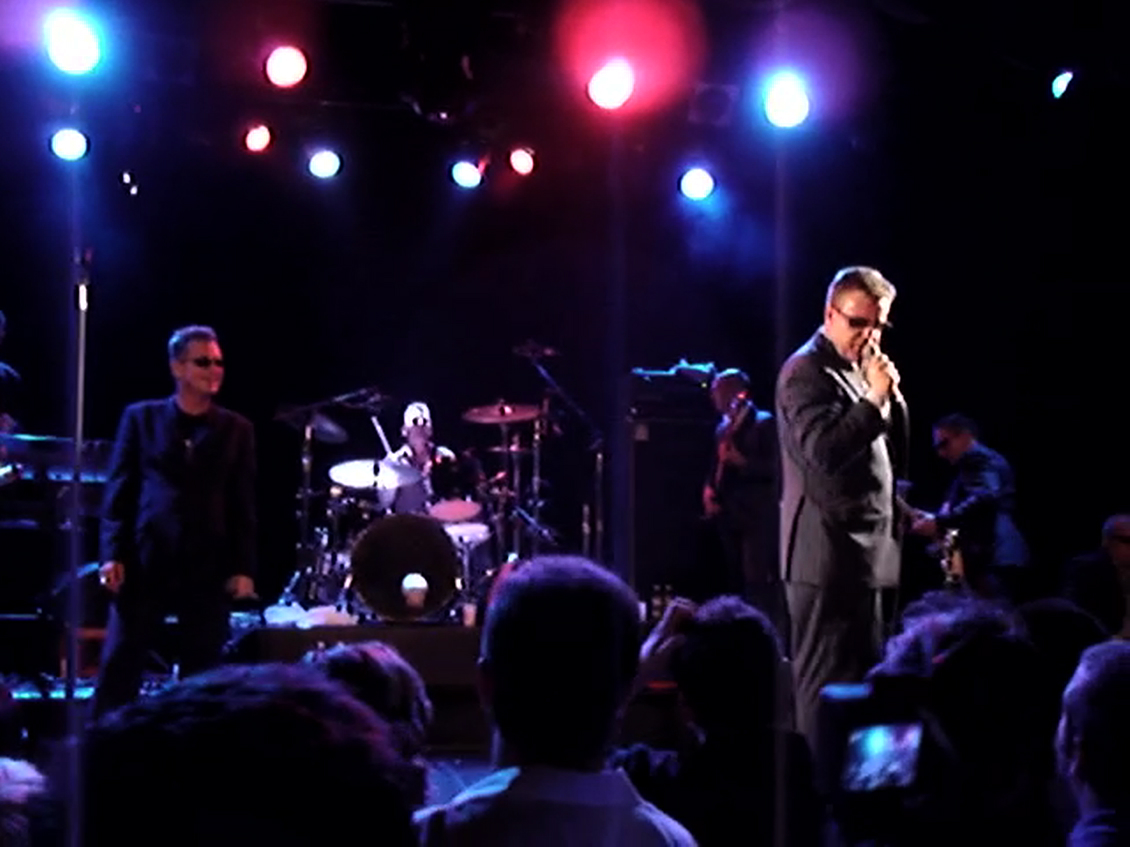
Madness performing live at Bimbos in 2005

In 2004, the band played a series of low-key concerts as the Dangermen, performing covers of classic reggae and ska songs. A lot of the songs were those played by the band when they were first forming, and the band performed the songs as a celebration of their 25th anniversary.

This led to the release of the cover album The Dangermen Sessions Vol. 1 in August 2005 by V2 Records. During the sessions which produced the album, in mid-2005, guitarist Chris Foreman announced his departure, citing "the petty, time consuming bollocks that goes on in the band" as his reason for leaving. The band completed the album without him, and on release, it peaked at no. 11 in the UK Albums Chart, which was the band's highest studio album chart position in 21 years. Although two singles were released, neither was a major success in the UK. The more successful of the two, "Shame & Scandal", reached number 38, but was more successful in France where it peaked at number 12. "Girl Why Don't You" did not chart and the band left the V2 record label shortly after. At this time, Kevin Burdette joined as the band's guitarist for live appearances and also appeared in the videos for both "Sorry" and "NW5" in early 2007.

The six remaining original members of Madness began working on their first original studio album in seven years. In March 2007, the non-LP single "Sorry" was released on the band's own record label Lucky 7 Records, peaking in the UK charts at number 23. The single included a version featuring UK hip-hop artists Sway DaSafo and Baby Blue.

The new Madness song "NW5" (then still titled "NW5 (I Would Give You Everything)") and a re-recorded version of "It Must Be Love" were featured in the German film Neues vom Wixxer. The two songs were released in Germany as a double A-side, and both of them were turned into music videos, which – besides members of the film's cast – featured Suggs, Chas Smash, Woody and stand-in guitarist Burdette. A re-recorded version of "NW5" was released as a single on 14 January 2008 in the UK, reaching no. 24 – this recording featured original Madness guitarist Chris Foreman, who had rejoined the band in time for the 2006 Christmas tour but had not participated in the original recording of the song.

In June 2008, Madness played the majority of their new studio album The Liberty of Norton Folgate at London's Hackney Empire for three nights. The Hackney Empire performances were recorded and sold to fans on USB wristbands as they left the show. Madness played two dates in December 2008, firstly in Manchester on 18 December, and secondly a return gig to The O2 in London on the 19th.

In December 2008, the band also announced that for their thirtieth anniversary in 2009, they would be staging a fifth Madstock Festival in London's Victoria Park on 17 July, 11 years after the last Madstock concert. It was originally rumoured that the newly reformed the Specials would make an appearance after finishing their reunion tour. However, this did not occur, although original Specials keyboardist Jerry Dammers – who was not part of the reunion line-up – was announced as a support act with the Spatial AKA Orchestra shortly before the festival. Dammers supported Madness again during their 2009 Christmas tour when he opened each night with a DJ set.

Through late March and early April 2009, the band played a series of festivals and separate headlining dates across Australia. The lead-up single from their latest studio album, titled "Dust Devil", was released on 11 May on Lucky 7 Records. Actors Alfie Allen and Jaime Winstone co-starred in the music video. The single charted at No. 64 on the UK Singles Chart and at No. 1 on the UK Independent charts on 17 May 2009.

The new studio album, entitled The Liberty of Norton Folgate, was released a week later, on 18 May 2009. It charted at No. 5 in the UK Albums Chart. The band continued to play various festivals, including Pinkpop, Splendour, and Glastonbury. On 27 September 2009, the band also played a free concert on a closed-off Regent Street in association with Absolute Radio.

As in previous years, the band embarked on a Christmas tour of the UK (also playing one concert in Dublin), playing at various medium-sized venues. Mark Bedford took a break from the band and was replaced by Graham Bush for the tour.

Some members of the band appeared in Catherine Tate's Nan's Christmas Carol. They first posed as carol singers, then played "Baggy Trousers" over the credits. On 18 January 2010, Madness released a fourth single, "Forever Young", from The Liberty of Norton Folgate. The single failed to chart.

During an interview with RTÉ 2fm radio host Dave Fanning on 24 May 2010, drummer Daniel Woodgate stated that the members of the band were in the final stages of preparing songs for the follow-up to The Liberty of Norton Folgate. The band hoped to be able to start recording the album later in 2010.

In September 2010, Madness were awarded the Idol Award at the Q Awards in London. Guitarist Chris Foreman stated in his acceptance speech that Madness were recording a new album.

Madness toured the UK throughout November and December 2010 with their final show at London's Earl's Court, where they played a new song from their upcoming album. However, two concerts, in Hull and Sheffield, were cancelled due to heavy snowfall, although they were later rescheduled for 5 and 6 February 2011 respectively.

=== 2011–2015: Oui Oui, Si Si, Ja Ja, Da Da ===
In June 2011, the band performed at Meltdown Festival at the Royal Festival Hall, curated by inspiration Ray Davies of the Kinks, who also introduced the band on stage. The concert served as the premiere of three new songs – "1978", "Can't Keep a Good Thing Down" and "Death of a Rude Boy".

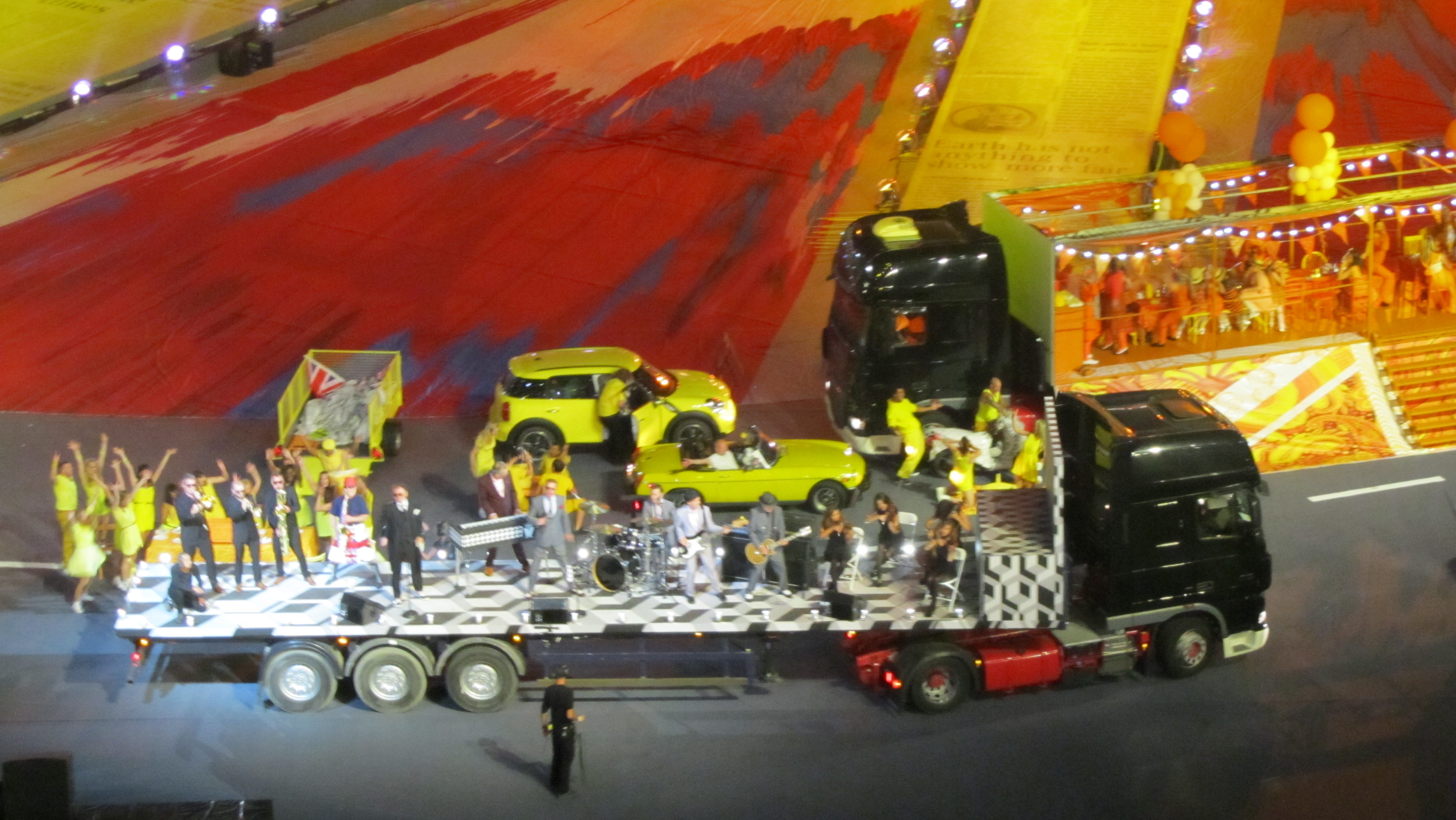
Madness performing at the 2012 Summer Olympics closing ceremony in London

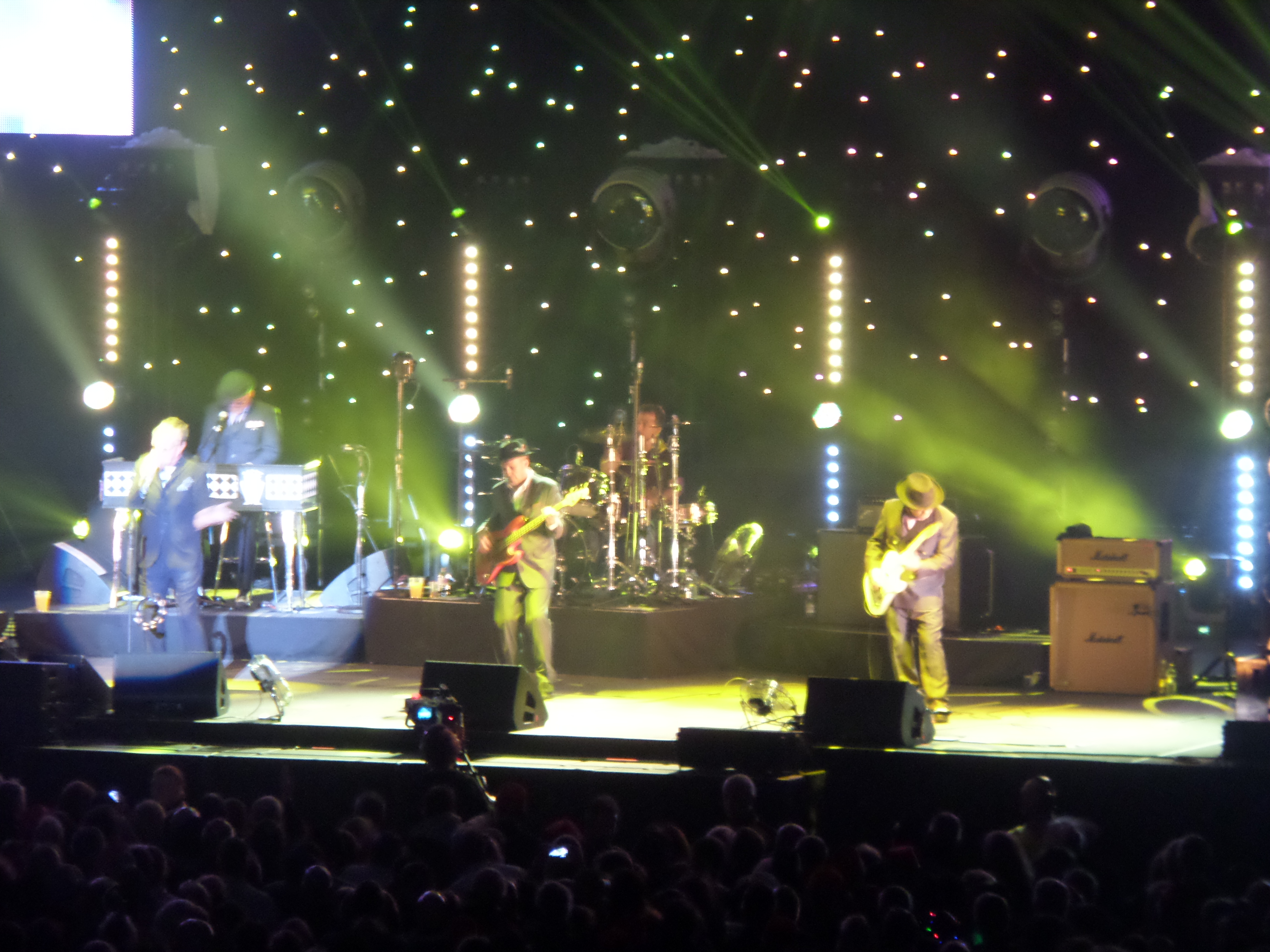
Madness on stage at the Manchester Arena in 2014

The summer of 2012 saw two notable performances. In June, the band performed at the Queen's Diamond Jubilee concert at Buckingham Palace. The band performed "Our House" and "It Must Be Love" from the roof of the palace with accompanying animations projected onto the palace front. In August, the band was the first to perform at the closing ceremony of the London Olympic Games. Departed bassist Bedford rejoined the band for both performances. In August 2012, Madness released "Death of a Rude Boy" as a free teaser track from their new studio album. Madness' tenth studio album Oui Oui, Si Si, Ja Ja, Da Da was released on 29 October 2012 and entered the UK Albums Chart at no. 10. In January 2013 the album re-entered the chart at no. 16 on the back of the airplay success of the single "Never Knew Your Name".

From the start of 2013, Bedford increased his performances with the band, building to his full-time return to the group, which meant a close to the four years Graham Bush had spent with the band.

On 22 March 2013, the band performed outside the BBC Television Centre in a live broadcast for BBC Four. This was followed by Goodbye Television Centre, a celebration of 50 years of the television centre, marking the closure of the building and the last show to be broadcast from it. Following that, the band was the closing act to the new year celebration of 2014 in Dublin, Ireland.

On 22 March 2014, Suggs confirmed that Madness were writing a new studio album, which he stated "the band plan to record in the summer and release by the end of 2014". Mike Barson also moved back to England from the Netherlands in 2014.

==== Departure of Cathal Smyth ====
In October 2014, Cathal Smyth, aka Chas Smash, announced that he had left Madness to pursue a solo career. His debut solo studio album, A Comfortable Man, was released on 11 May 2015 by Phoenix Rising Recording Co. Although Smyth's departure was characterised by him and the band at the time as a 'break' to concentrate on his solo career and not necessarily a permanent departure, Smyth has not rejoined Madness in over a decade since the break was announced.

When asked about the matter in 2026, Suggs said, "Well, he wanted to take a break, and then the break sort of went on. He writes poetry and stuff, but hasn’t felt inclined to write pop music for a while…so I don’t know. That’s in the lap of the gods."

=== 2016–2022: Can't Touch Us Now ===
The band announced their new studio album Can't Touch Us Now in May 2016. In support of the album, the band played the Pyramid Stage at the Glastonbury Festival in June. Lead single "Mr. Apples" was accompanied by a scripted video (first one since 2009) and A-listed by BBC Radio 2. The song "Herbert" was released as a taster accompanied by an animation video. Further singles "Can't Touch Us Now" and "Another Version of Me" were also playlisted by BBC Radio 2. The album itself entered the UK Albums Chart at number 5 in November 2016. The band finished the year on a UK arena tour in December.

Throughout 2017, the band played at several festivals and concerts worldwide, including mainland Europe, Asia, and Australia. In April, their first Australian gig at the Fremantle Arts Centre in Western Australia sold out, necessitating a second gig the following night. In August, the band hosted their own "House of Common Festival" for the second year on Clapham Common. This was the band's only London gig of the year.

In 2018, the band embarked on a summer tour of stately homes in the UK before a Christmas arena tour in December. Madness performed on New Year's Eve through to New Year's Day at "Madness Rocks Big Ben Live". The entire performance was shown on BBC One before and after that year's fireworks.

In March 2019, Madness announced the release of their group autobiography, Before We Was We: Madness by Madness, to be released on hardback that October. The book includes commentary from all seven members telling the story of their early days and childhoods up until their breakthrough as a group. In May 2021, the book was adapted as a three-part TV documentary on AMC, with the first part free on BT's YouTube channel.

The band celebrated 40 years since their debut studio album release with several special live appearances throughout 2019. The band performed at their own "House of Common" festival in August and held a special concert with a full orchestra at Kenwood House. In November, they played at Electric Ballroom in Camden, forty years to the day since one of their first appearances there. The performance was broadcast on Sky Arts in 2020. The band saw the year out with three concerts at The Roundhouse.

In December 2019, the band released a new single, "Bullingdon Boys (Don't Get Bullied by the Bully Boys)". The NME described the song as a 'barbed swipe at Boris Johnson and his Eton cohorts'. In March 2020, Madness were honoured on the Camden 'Music Walk Of Fame' with a stone unveiling, which saw members Suggs, Mike Barson, Mark Bedford, Dan Woodgate, as well as former member Cathal Smyth, in attendance.

In April 2021, following some special videos created during the COVID-19 pandemic, Madness announced their first global live stream, titled "The Get Up!", to be held the next month. It featured live music and comedy from the group and Charlie Higson, pre-recorded at the London Palladium. During the live stream, the band was accompanied by Roland Gift of Fine Young Cannibals and Paul Weller of the Jam and had a cameo by Queen Elizabeth II, played by Mike Barson. They announced their 2021 tour, The Ladykillers Tour, the next day, to be held alongside Squeeze.

=== 2023–present: Theatre of the Absurd Presents C'est la Vie ===
In September 2023, the band announced their thirteenth studio album Theatre of the Absurd Presents C'est la Vie, which was released on 17 November 2023. It was followed by a UK tour with the Lightning Seeds, including stops in Liverpool, Manchester and London.

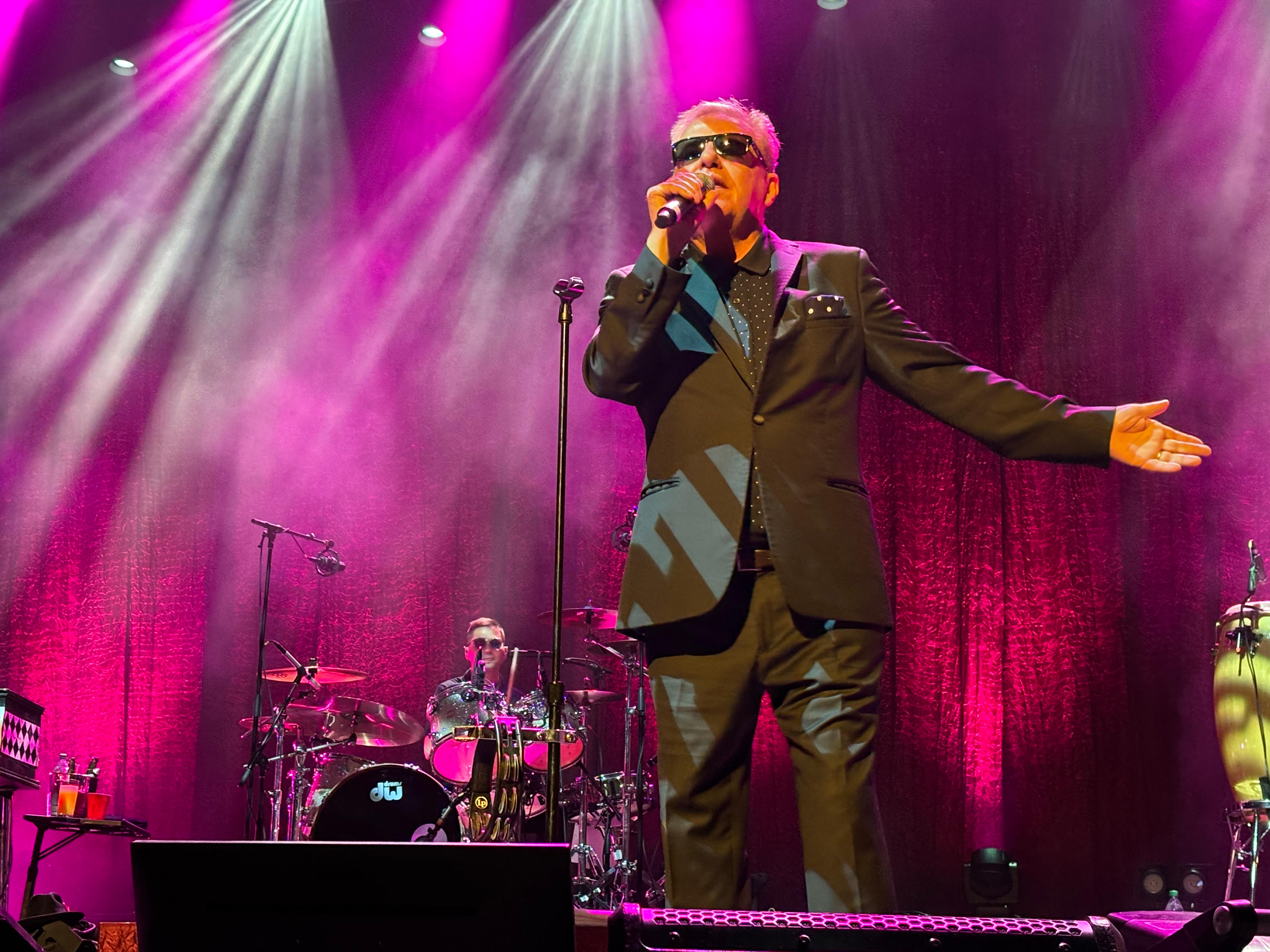
Graham "Suggs" McPherson performs with Madness at MGM Fenway in Boston on the Theatre of the Absurd Presents C'est la Vie tour on 29 May 2024

The album was preceded by the single "C'est La Vie" and "Baby Burglar", a song inspired by the antics of band members in their youth, including breaking into singer-songwriter Lynsey de Paul's house. A new video featured these two singles plus a performance of Round We Go.

It would become Madness' first ever number one studio album in the UK. The album also made the album charts in Ireland, Germany and The Netherlands.

On 11 December, a full version of the "C'est La Vie" video was released, followed by "Baby Burglar" on 23 January 2024.

In February, it was announced that "Round We Go" would be released as the official new single. A full video was released on 6 February, followed by a single edit on 16 February. On 23 February the song was added to BBC Radio 2's New Music Playlist.

In April, the enhanced version of Theatre Of The Absurd Presents C'est La Vie was announced, featuring 5 new songs and 7 unreleased live songs from the December tour, including the band's version of The Specials' "Friday Night Saturday Morning". "No Reason" – written by Suggs – was made available directly.

On 17 May – just before the band would go on their first US tour in 12 years – "Hour Of Need" was released as a single and went straight to the BBC Radio 2 playlist. The release was accompanied by the announcement of the 'Hour Of Need' Award, for which fans could honour an unsung hero in their lives.

In August 2025, guitarist Chris Foreman revealed that he had been diagnosed with myeloma, a treatable but incurable form of blood cancer. He first experienced symptoms earlier that year, including severe pain in his upper back and shoulders, which led to an MRI scan and the discovery of a spinal tumour. Following radiotherapy and a spinal tap procedure, Foreman stated that his kidney function—initially at 14%—had "greatly improved."

He stated that despite recent recovery, he would not be able to participate in the band's upcoming tours for the rest of the year, but expressed hope of achieving remission and returning to performing in 2026. In June 2026, Foreman announced that his cancer had gone into full remission and that he would be returning to play with Madness in further live performances. He made his comeback performance with the band on June 7th at the Summer Fest at the Beach in Weston Super Mare.

== Spinoff acts ==
=== The Fink Brothers ===
The Fink Brothers were a short-lived alter ego created by Madness members Suggs and Chas Smash, working under the aliases Angel and Ratty Fink, using characters from the British science fiction-oriented comic magazine 2000 AD.

Single

Year	Song(s)	Album	UK	Notes
1985	"Mutants in Mega-City One"	Non-LP single	50	This was the only release by the Fink Brothers. It consisted of two songs.

=== The Madness ===
A promotional photograph of The Madness (left to right): Thompson, Foreman, Smash, and Suggs

The Madness was a line-up of Madness without bassist Mark Bedford, drummer Daniel Woodgate and keyboardist Mike Barson, active between 1987 and 1988. Formed by Suggs, Chas Smash, Lee Thompson and Chris Foreman in early 1987, they distinguished this line-up from the previous Madness line-up only by adding the word "The" to the band's name. The band had held a competition to find a new name on BBC Radio 1. They decided on 'The Wasp Factory' after the Iain Banks novel of the same name, but that name had already been taken by another band.

The album is notable for featuring guest performers including the Specials' Jerry Dammers, early Madness member John Hasler and Earl Falconer of UB40. It is also the first studio album produced by the band themselves under the alias 'The Three Eyes', which was Suggs, Carl, and Chris. The band then released their eponymous debut album The Madness and the singles "I Pronounce You" and "What's That" in mid-1988 under Virgin Records.

However, due to a lack of commercial and critical success, potential tour plans for the summer were aborted. As such, The Madness never made any live performances during their brief existence. The group's relationship with Virgin began to sour as they attempted to write a follow-up album to stay on the label, with musical differences arising between the band members. As such, Virgin dropped the band, and The Madness split up soon after.

The Guinness Book of British Hit Singles and many online discographies consider this band to be the same as "Madness". Several of the songs on the album ("4BF", "Be Good Boy", "Gabriels Horn", "In Wonder") were reworked songs from the cancelled 1986 Madness studio album and had been performed live or demoed in 1986 before the band broke up. Lee Thompson and Chris Foreman also alluded to this view on their sole studio album Crunch! (1990), which was dedicated to "the good ship Madness and all who sailed in her (1979 to 1989)".

Studio album

- 1988: The Madness

Singles

Year	Song(s)	Album	UK	Notes
1988	"I Pronounce You"	The Madness	44	The music video shows Thompson playing the flute.
1988	"What's That"	The Madness	92	The first single by Madness or any of its spin-off bands not to make the top 75.

=== The Nutty Boys (Crunch!) ===
The Nutty Boys were Lee Thompson and Chris Foreman of Madness, who formed the band in 1990 and released their only studio album Crunch!. In 1996, the band officially changed their band name to "Crunch!", with "Magic Carpet" being released under the name.

Singles

Year	Title	UK	Notes
1992	"It's OK, I'm a Policeman"	–	Issued as a four-track EP and cassette single. B-Sides – "Fight Amongst Yourselves", "Birthday Girl" and "Magic Carpet"
1996	"Magic Carpet" (by Crunch!)	–	Crunch!'s lone single. Received extremely limited commercial release. B-Sides – "Danger Zone", "Hereditary", "Magic Carpet" (live at the Half Moon, Putney).

Studio album

- 1990: Crunch!

=== The Lee Thompson Ska Orchestra ===
The Lee Thompson Ska Orchestra was formed in 2011 by Thompson, with Mark Bedford on bass and a revolving line-up of musicians, initially playing ska covers before writing original material for their second album.

Studio albums

- 2013: The Benevolence of Sister Mary Ignatius
- 2016: Bite the Bullet

== Collaborations ==
Madness collaborated with Elvis Costello in 1983 on a version of their song "Tomorrow's (Just Another Day)". It was released as a bonus track to the 12" copy of the single. In later years, Barson stated that Costello's "Watching the Detectives" was the main influence on the song "My Girl". They were also asked to participate in Live Aid, but declined as they were in a period of turmoil at the time and were very busy rehearsing songs for Mad Not Mad. However, Suggs, Carl, and Lee did participate in Fashion Aid instead. After the split of The Madness, Suggs and Lee performed with Deaf School during their reunion gigs in June 1988, with Suggs also performing at Deaf School's gig for the Big Beat '89 campaign in July 1989, which raised £750 for the Hillsborough disaster fund.

Several members of the band also collaborated with Morrissey in his early solo career. Having been a Madness fan himself, Morrissey started working with former Madness producers Clive Langer and Alan Winstanley in 1989. Morrissey then recruited Suggs in late 1989 to help him complete a new album, which was scrapped and saw the compilation album Bona Drag released instead in October 1990. Suggs contributed backing vocals on the single "Piccadilly Palare" and its B-side "Get Off The Stage". Morrissey also befriended Cathal during recording sessions for Kill Uncle in late 1990, who introduced him to Boz Boorer, who continued to work with Morrissey for the next 3 decades. Morrissey tried to recruit Cathal as his manager, but instead had him contribute backing vocals to his cover of "That's Entertainment", the B-side to his single "Sing Your Life", which also had Suggs return on backing vocals and Mark Bedford on bass, who had played bass on the entirety of the Kill Uncle album.

For Wonderful in 1999, Ian Dury laid down vocals on the track "Drip Fed Fred" which was released as the last single from the album. It was Dury's last recording before his death. Ill health prevented Dury from actively promoting the single, although he did appear on the National Lottery Show. For a later performance on TFI Friday, the song was reworked to incorporate Phill Jupitus on vocals. Live, Madness have collaborated with artists including UB40 and Prince Buster, notably at their first Madstock concert. They have also played live frequently with members of the other 2 Tone bands, including the Specials. In May 2008, Suggs and Carl performed live with Pet Shop Boys at London's Heaven collaborating on a new arrangement of "My Girl", as part of a tribute evening to their former minder Dainton 'The Bear' Connell, called Can You Bear It?. A few days afterwards, Pet Shop Boys posted their own version of the track on their official website.

In late 2010, the band collaborated in the Cage Against the Machine project, in which numerous artists performed John Cage's 4′33″ for a charity single intended to prevent the winner of The X Factor claiming the Christmas Number 1. The title refers to the previous year's successful campaign to get Rage Against the Machine's "Killing in the Name" to chart above X Factor winner Joe McElderry.

== Lyrical themes ==
Frequent themes in Madness' songs included childhood memories (e.g., "Baggy Trousers", and "Our House") and petty crime (e.g., "Shut Up", and "Deceives the Eye"). Although Madness were seen by some as somewhat of a humorous band with catchy, bouncy songs, many of their songs took a darker tone (such as the singles "Grey Day" and "Tomorrow's (Just Another Day)") and they sometimes tackled what were, at the time, controversial issues in their lyrics. "Embarrassment" (from the Absolutely album) was written by Lee Thompson & Mike Barson, and reflected the unfolding turmoil following the news that his teenage sister had become pregnant and was carrying a black man's child. Madness discussed animal testing in the song "Tomorrow's Dream", which Thompson & Barson also wrote. The band criticised the National Health Service (NHS) in "Mrs. Hutchinson", which told the story of a woman who, after several misdiagnoses and mistreatment, became terminally ill. The story was based on the experiences of Mike Barson's mother. Madness' final single prior to disbanding, "(Waiting For) The Ghost Train", commented on apartheid in South Africa.

== Awards ==
The band's first notable musical award came in 1983 when Chris Foreman and Cathal Smyth won an Ivor Novello Award for Best Song for the international hit "Our House". Madness received another Ivor Novello Award 17 years later for an "Outstanding Song Collection". In 2005, they were awarded the Mojo "Hall of Fame" Award, notably for being "an artist's artist". In 2007, a campaign took place by fans of Madness for the band to be awarded a Brit Award. Many fans and critics feel they have been overlooked over their past 30 years in the music industry. In July 2009, Madness were awarded the 'Silver Clef' Icon Award. In September 2010, Madness were awarded the 'Idol Award' at the 2010 Q Awards in London.

== Members ==
Members of the classic line-up are listed in bold.

Current members

- **Chris Foreman** – guitar, sitar (1976–1986, 1992–2005, 2006–present; not touring during 2025-2026)
- **Mike Barson** – keyboards, piano, percussion, harmonica, backing vocals (1976–1984, 1986, 1992–present)
- **Lee Thompson** – saxophone, percussion, vocals (1976–1977, 1978–1986, 1992–present)
- **Graham "Suggs" McPherson** – vocals, percussion (1977, 1978–1986, 1992–present)
- **Dan Woodgate** – drums, percussion (1978–1986, 1992–present)
- **Mark Bedford** – bass (1978–1986, 1992–2009, 2012, 2013–present; not touring during 1995–1996, 2009–2012, 2012–2013)

Former members

- **Cathal "Chas Smash" Smyth** – bass (1976–1977), vocals, trumpet, dancing (1979–1986, 1992–2014)

Current touring members and regular guests

- Mike Kearsey – trombone (1999, 2004, 2005–present) (live and studio)
- Joe Auckland – trumpet (2005–present) (live and studio)
- Steve Hamilton – saxophone (2011–2012, c. 2016 – present) (live and studio)
- Mez Clough – percussion, backing vocals (2016–present) (live and studio), drums (2017, 2021) (live)

Former touring members and regular guests

- Dick Cuthell – French horn, flugel horn, cornet (1983–1985) (live and studio)
- Nick Parker – violin (1983) (live)
- Jonathan Kahan – violin (1983) (live)
- Suzanne Rosenfeld – viola (1983) (live)
- Caroline Verney – cello (1983) (live)
- Paul Carrack – keyboards (1984) (live)
- James Mackie – keyboards (1984) (live)
- Steve Nieve – keyboards (1985, 1988) (live and studio)
- Terry Disley – keyboards (1985–1986) (live)
- Seamus Beaghan – keyboards (1985–1986, 2009, 2012, 2021) (live and studio)
- Jimmy Helms – backing vocals (1985–1986) (live and studio)
- Jimmy Thomas – backing vocals (1985–1986) (live and studio)
- Lorenza Johnson – backing vocals (1985–1986) (live)
- Bosco De Oliveira – percussion (1985–1986) (live)
- Norman Watt-Roy – bass (1995–1996) (live)
- Terry Edwards – saxophone, trumpet (2003) (live)
- Steve Turner – saxophone (2003, 2005 – c. 2016) (live and studio)
- Kevin Burdett – guitar (2005–2006, 2013, 2025–2026 (standing in for Chris Foreman)) (live and studio)
- John "Segs" Jennings – guitar (2005) (live and studio)
- Graham Bush – bass (2005, 2009–2013) (live and studio)
- Paul Fisher – trombone (2016–2017) (live)
- Neil Waters – trumpet (2017–2019) (live)
- Paul Burton – trombone (2019) (live)

Members of North London Invaders only (band changed name to "Madness" in 1979)

- John Hasler – drums (1976–1977), vocals (1976–1978)
- Dikran Tulaine – vocals (1976)
- Gavin Rodgers – bass (1977–1978)
- Garry Dovey – drums (1977–1978)

== Discography ==
- One Step Beyond... (1979)
- Absolutely (1980)
- 7 (1981)
- The Rise & Fall (1982)
- Keep Moving (1984)
- Mad Not Mad (1985)
- The Madness (1988)
- Wonderful (1999)
- The Dangermen Sessions Vol. 1 (2005)
- The Liberty of Norton Folgate (2009)
- Oui Oui, Si Si, Ja Ja, Da Da (2012)
- Can't Touch Us Now (2016)
- Theatre of the Absurd Presents C'est la Vie (2023)

== Tours ==
- Two Tone Tour (1979)
- Absolutely Tour (1980)
- Seven Tour (1981)
- Complete Madness Tour (1982)
- Rise and Fall Tour (1983)
- Keep Moving Tour (1984)
- Mad Not Mad Tour (1985)
- Christmas Madness (1992)
- The Man in the Mad Suit (1993)
- Mad Dogs (1995)
- The Maddest Show on Earth (1999)
- Welcome to the Wonderful World of Madness (2003)
- To the Edge of the Universe & Beyond (2006)
- On Board the Nutty Express (2007)
- The Liberty of Norton Folgate (2009)
- Do Not Adjust Your Nut (2010)
- Butlin's House of Fun Weekender (Minehead only) (2011–2021, 2025–present)
- Charge of the Mad Brigade (2012)
- Oui Oui, Si Si, Ja Ja, Da Da (2013)
- All for the M.A.D.H.E.A.D. (2014)
- Grandslam Madness (2015)
- Can't Touch Us Now (2016)
- Stately Madness (2018)
- The Sound of Madness (2018)
- Madness XL (2018–2019)
- The Ladykillers Tour (2021)
- The Great European Roadtrip (2022–2023)
- C'est La Vie (2023)

== See also ==
- Take It or Leave It (1981 film)
