= (Waiting For) The Ghost Train =

1986 single from Madness

Single by Madness

from the album Utter Madness
- B-side: "Maybe in Another Life"; "Seven Year Scratch"
- Released: 27 October 1986
- Recorded: September 1986
- Genre: Pop; two-tone
- Length: 3:45
- Label: Zarjazz
- Songwriter: Graham McPherson
- Producers: Clive Langer; Alan Winstanley

Madness singles chronology
"Sweetest Girl" (1986)	"(Waiting For) The Ghost Train" (1986)	"I Pronounce You" (1988)

Music video
- "(Waiting For) The Ghost Train" on YouTube

"(Waiting For) The Ghost Train" is a single by the English ska and pop band Madness. Released on 27 October 1986 shortly after the band announced they were to break-up, it was their last single prior to reforming in 1992. It spent nine weeks in the UK singles chart, peaking at number 18. The song first appeared on an album on the band's 1986's Utter Madness greatest hits compilation, issued one month after its single release.

The song was written by Suggs about apartheid in South Africa, with its chorus "It's black and white, don't try to hide it" and the line "The station master's writing with a piece of orange chalk / One hundred cancellations, still no one wants to walk" (in reference to the South African flag). Former keyboardist Mike Barson reunited with the other members of the band to record this song, although he did not appear in the music video.

A Christmas flexi disc record containing the 'band demo' of the song was sent out to Madness fan club (M.I.S.) members, featuring farewells and thanks from each member of the band (except Barson).

== Critical reception ==
Upon its release, Anna Martin of Number One stated: "Reminiscent of the classic sound of "Grey Day" and "The Sun and the Rain", the chorus follows in the great tradition of sing-a-long-ability and ends in a big, sweeping crescendo that signals the end." Edwin Pouncey of Sounds noted that the "neat enough finale" should "please their loyal fans" as it has "all the hallmarks of a genuine Madness gold record". Simon Mills of Smash Hits related the song to the band's recent material of that time: "Their "farewell single" is more of the same doomy stuff about an unfortunate bunch of folk who are all waiting for this train that never comes. Life's like that isn't it?"

== Track listing ==
=== 7": Virgin / JAZZ 9 (UK) ===
- Side one
1. "(Waiting For) The Ghost Train" – 3:41
- Side two
1. "Maybe in Another Life" – 3:00

=== 12": Virgin / JAZZ 9 12 (UK) ===
- Side one
1. "(Waiting For) The Ghost Train" – 3:41
2. "Maybe in Another Life" – 2:59
- Side two
1. "Seven Year Scratch" – 8:39

== Charts ==
Chart (1986)	Peak position
Irish Singles Chart	9
UK Singles Chart	18
