= Madstock! =

Live album by Madness
- Released: 2 November 1992
- Recorded: 8 and 9 August 1992
- Venues: Finsbury Park, London
- Genres: Ska; 2 tone; pop
- Length: 62:22
- Label: Go! Discs
- Producers: Clive Langer; Alan Winstanley

Madness chronology
The Madness (1988)	Madstock! (1992)	Universal Madness (1999)

Singles from Madstock!
- 1. "The Harder They Come" Released: 1992

Alternative cover
- 2015 reissue by Salvo

Madstock! is the first live album by the ska and pop band Madness, released on 2 November 1992 (see 1992 in music) by Go! Discs. The album includes highlights from Madness' first concerts since their disbanding in 1986, on 8 and 9 August 1992 at Finsbury Park in London. The bill included Flowered Up, Gallon Drunk, Ian Dury and The Blockheads, Morrissey and Madness.

The full concert was released on a corresponding video. Both the album and video are now out of print. However, a DVD of the concert is available in the box set A Guided Tour of Madness. The concert briefly spawned a series of biennial Madstock events (the name sometimes rendered with no exclamation mark) in 1994, 1996, and 1998 (this last Madstock is available on DVD). In December 2008 the band announced that they would be staging a 5th Madstock concert in 2009 to celebrate their 30th anniversary held on 17 July in Victoria Park, East London.

The album reached #22 in the UK album charts. "The Harder They Come", a cover of the Jimmy Cliff song, was released as the only single off this album and reached #44 in the UK charts.

On 9 October 2015, Salvo reissued the album and video as a 1-CD/1-DVD set with four CD bonus tracks.

== Production and album cover ==
Production

Madstock! was recorded on 8 and 9 August 1992 using the Fleetwood Mobile recording studio, and then produced and mixed by Clive Langer and Alan Winstanley at their Westside Studios in London. Seven tracks were chosen from day one and eleven from day two.

Album cover

The cover photographs were taken by rock photographer Jill Furmanovsky in The Hague in the Netherlands, where Madness were playing a warm-up gig for Madstock on 6 August. Wanting to create an action shot, Furmanovsky had the band jump on a beach trampoline and later collaged the individual shots together on a computer.

== Critical reception ==
Professional ratings
Review scores
Source	Rating
All About the Rock	7.5/10
AllMusic	2.5/5 stars
Louder Than War	8/10
The Press	3/5 stars
Record Collector	4/5 stars
Songwriting	4/5 stars

Simon Tucker of the Louder Than War website called the album "musically tight with not a duff note," saying, "This album is a joy, an example of a band not understanding how influential they are or how loved until one magic moment brings it home for them." Trouser Press wrote, "the band sounds tight and in top form; the sing-along enthusiasm of the crowd makes the disc particularly infectious." AllMusic's Evan Cater was less positive, saying, "Suggs' decision to sacrifice vocal quality for exuberance is more excusable than the unimaginative arrangements of the songs, which vary little from the original studio recordings. Moreover, the singles-heavy song selection ... is a little boring for serious fans."

Commenting on the 2015 reissue, Charles Hutchinson of The Press was disappointed that Salvo's CD and DVD package did not match the occasion: "The running order is jettisoned on the CD, with four numbers consigned to bin ends, while the DVD needed to be more of a documentary." Russell Deeks of Songwriting magazine wrote, "They may have been a little bit rough around the edges in places on the day ... but their knockabout humour and unrivaled sense of showmanship were definitely undimished [sic] " Deeks noted that the video quality of the DVD isn't the best, as it has apparently been transferred over from the original VHS release.

== Track listing ==
No.	Title	Writer(s)	Length
1.	"One Step Beyond"	Cecil Campbell	3:29
2.	"The Prince"	Lee Thompson	2:32
3.	"Embarrassment"	Thompson, Mike Barson	3:17
4.	"My Girl"	Barson	2:57
5.	"The Sun and the Rain"	Barson	3:24
6.	"Grey Day"	Barson	4:59
7.	"It Must Be Love"	Labi Siffre	3:38
8.	"Shut Up"	Graham McPherson, Chris Foreman	3:28
9.	"Driving in My Car"	Barson	3:22
10.	"Bed and Breakfast Man"	Barson	2:28
11.	"Close Escape"	Thompson, Foreman	2:52
12.	"Wings of a Dove"	McPherson, Carl Smyth	3:16
13.	"Our House"	Foreman, Smyth	3:31
14.	"Night Boat to Cairo"	McPherson, Barson	3:43
15.	"Madness"	Campbell	3:10
16.	"House of Fun"	Thompson, Barson	2:52
17.	"Baggy Trousers"	McPherson, Foreman	2:38
18.	"The Harder They Come"	Jimmy Cliff	5:44
Total length:			62:22

=== 2015 reissue ===
Disc 1

The first disc contains the eighteen tracks from the original album plus four bonus tracks.
Bonus track 20 is previously unreleased on CD; tracks 19, 21 and 22 have appeared on the single "The Harder They Come".

Bonus tracks
No.	Title	Writer(s)	Length
19.	"Land of Hope and Glory"	Thompson	4:05
20.	"Razor Blade Alley"	Thompson	2:57
21.	"Tomorrow's (Just Another Day)"	Smyth, Barson	3:22
22.	"Take It or Leave It"	Thompson, Barson	3:52
Total length:			76:44

Disc 2

Madstock! DVD
No.	Title	Writer(s)	Length
1.	"One Step Beyond"	Campbell	2:47
2.	"The Prince"	Thompson	3:06
3.	"Embarrassment"	Thompson, Barson	3:13
4.	"My Girl"	Barson	3:01
5.	"The Sun and the Rain"	Barson	4:06
6.	"Land of Hope and Glory"	Thompson	3:49
7.	"Grey Day"	Barson	5:27
8.	"Razor Blade Alley"	Thompson	3:01
9.	"It Must Be Love"	Siffre	3:50
10.	"Tomorrow's (Just Another Day)"	Smyth, Barson	3:24
11.	"Take It or Leave It"	Thompson, Barson	4:03
12.	"Shut Up"	McPherson, Foreman	4:01
13.	"Driving in My Car"	Barson	3:48
14.	"Bed and Breakfast Man"	Barson	3:07
15.	"Close Escape"	Thompson, Foreman	4:56
16.	"Wings of a Dove"	McPherson, Smyth	5:21
17.	"Our House"	Foreman, Smyth	3:47
18.	"Night Boat to Cairo"	McPherson, Barson	3:32
19.	"Madness"	Campbell	4:23
20.	"Swan Lake"	Pyotr Ilyich Tchaikovsky; arranged by Barson	2:36
21.	"House of Fun"	Thompson, Barson	3:11
22.	"Rockin' in A♭"	Willy Wurlitzer	2:53
23.	"Baggy Trousers"	McPherson, Foreman	2:54
24.	"The Harder They Come"	Cliff	8:16
Total length:			105:00

== Personnel ==
Credits adapted from the album's liner notes.

Madness

- Graham "Suggs" McPherson – vocals
- Mike Barson – keyboards
- Lee Thompson – saxophone, vocals
- Chris Foreman – guitar
- Mark Bedford – bass
- Daniel Woodgate – drums, percussion
- Cathal Smyth – vocals, trumpet

Technical

- Clive Langer – producer, mixing
- Alan Winstanley – producer, mixing, DVD audio mixing
- Paul Mortimer – engineer (Westside Studios)
- Andy Rose – engineer (Fleetwood Mobile)
- Peter Jones – engineer (Fleetwood Mobile)
- Ian Bridges – assistant engineer (Fleetwood Mobile)
- Jill Furmanovsky – art direction, photography
- Ryan Art – design
- William Smith – liner notes
- Estuary English – art direction (2015 reissue)
- Piers Allardyce – photography (2015 reissue)
- Ian Gittins – liner notes (2015 reissue)

DVD

- Gavin Taylor – film director
- Dione Orram – producer
- Rocky Oldham – producer
- Juliet De Valero-Wills – executive producer
- Malcolm Gerrie – executive producer
- Meedja – DVD authoring

== Chart performance ==
Chart (1992)	Peak position	Total weeks
UK Albums Chart	22	9
