= I Pronounce You =

Single by The Madness

from the album The Madness
- B-side: "Patience"; "4BF"; "11th Hour"
- Released: 7 March 1988
- Recorded: 1987
- Studio: Liquidator Studios (London)
- Genre: Pop
- Length: 4:38
- Label: Virgin
- Songwriters: Lee Thompson (lyrics); Carl Smyth (music)
- Producer: The Three Eyes

The Madness singles chronology
"(Waiting For) The Ghost Train" (1986)	"I Pronounce You" (1988)	"What's That" (1988)

Music video
- "I Pronounce You" on YouTube

"I Pronounce You" is a single by the English ska and pop band the Madness from their self-titled studio album The Madness. It was released as the lead single from the album on 7 March 1988 by Virgin Records. It was written by their saxophonist Lee Thompson and their co-lead vocalist Carl Smyth. The single features the non-album track "Patience" as the B-side, which is exclusive to this single.

The song was recorded at Liquidator Studios in London, while the mixing of the track was finished at The Townhouse, also in London.

== Cover artwork ==
The single's sleeve was designed by Dave Gibbons and Rian Hughes. The cover features a drawing in a similar style to the album's cover - resembling a face.

== Music and lyrics ==
The song's lyrics refer to a bride's feelings on the eve of her arranged marriage. In addition to his usual guitar, Chris Foreman plays the sitar and the instrumentation used in the song includes the tabla which gives the song a more Middle Eastern sound.

== Chart performance ==
The single peaked at No. 44 in the UK, lasting on the charts for four weeks after originally debuting at No. 48.

== Music video ==
A music video was made for the song. Originally, Virgin wanted The Madness to film with a director the label liked, and screened one of their videos for the band. However, the band went against the label and shot the video on their own. Guitarist Chris Foreman stated, "For the video, Virgin originally wanted us to work with some director they liked and showed us a video he’d done, which was the worst thing I’d ever seen; it had someone dressed as the Hunchback of Notre Dame swinging around. It was so bad I walked out of the screening – that was what our relationship with Virgin was like at that point. Instead, we managed to get a film crew together with the help of Carl’s mate Ronnie and made the video ourselves."

It features an appearance from John Hasler, the ex-Madness drummer and manager. When Foreman was asked about the music video in an interview for Guitarist & Scootering, he said "On the one video we've just done we tried to be serious, but Lee's got a Mohican haircut and in a bit of it we dyed his face red and things like that". It later appeared as part of the 1992 VHS compilation Divine Madness, which was later issued on DVD in 2002 and as a CD+DVD set in 2005. It is notably The Madness's only single to feature a music video.

== Television appearances ==
The one and only TV appearance of The Madness performing this track was on Friday Night Live, a cult late night comedy show hosted by Ben Elton, on March 11th 1988. The band also played the album track "Beat the Bride" on the show.

== Critical reception ==
Upon its release, John Aizlewood of Number One considered "I Pronounce You" to be "well worth the wait" and rated it four out of five stars. He commented, "Suggs tries to sing, there's a tasteful sitar or 20, and they sound suitably mournful." Music & Media, who described it as "good stuff", felt that the "sound [is] much the same" as Madness' previous work but added that the chorus is "very Beatles, circa Sgt. Pepper". Pete Paisley of Record Mirror considered it to be "a quite and gentle marriage song featuring sitars and flutes" and "almost a direct follow on from their 'Sweetest Girl' style". He added, "Not quite the comeback hoped for, but at least they're hatching plans again and intent on not remaining yesterday's men any longer."

Jack Barron of NME was critical of the song, noting that he "detested [it] at first for its sitar pingings and almost formulaic approach". He added, "The picture this tune paints is one of horse carriages, blustery bridesmaids, gormless grooms, apoplectic parents all bent on a marriage made in Hell conducted by a deaf priest. If that sounds like a swell party this record doesn't." Chris Roberts of Melody Maker was also negative in his review, describing it as "nondescript" and "mundane".

== Track listing ==
- 7"
1. "I Pronounce You" (Thompson/Smyth/West) - 4:38
2. "Patience" (McPherson/Smyth) - 3:34
- 12", CD
1. "I Pronounce You" (Thompson/Smyth/West) - 4:38
2. "4BF (Thompson) - 2:54
3. "Patience" (McPherson/Smyth) - 4:40
4. "11th Hour" (McPherson/Foreman) - 4:31

A Limited Edition box set was also released, featuring all four tracks on a 7-inch EP, and including an enamel badge and two postcards.
