= John Hasler (musician) =

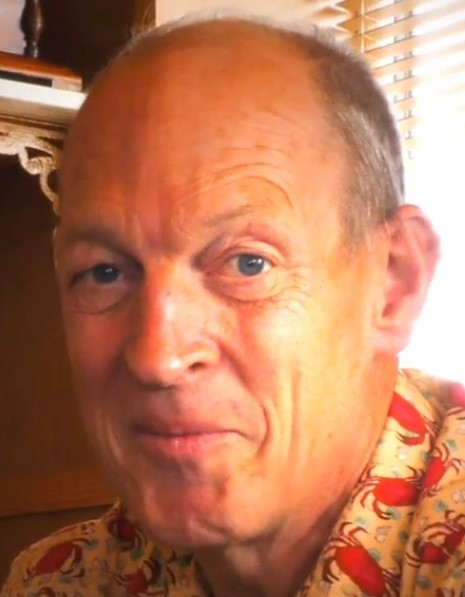
- Hasler in 2022

Background information
- Genres: Ska, punk, celtic
- Occupation: Musician
- Instruments: Drums, vocals
- Years active: 1976–1983
- Formerly of: The North London Invaders, The Pogues

John Hasler is a British musician. He is best known for being the original drummer (and later lead vocalist then manager) for The North London Invaders, who in 1979 became Madness. He was also the original drummer for The Pogues from 1982 to 1983.

== Early life ==
Hasler attended William Ellis School in Highgate with future Madness members Chas Smash and Mark Bedford, and lived across the street from Smash. John was known as "Rockin’ Billy Whizz" as he had his hair styled in a blonde quiff.

== The North London Invaders: 1976–1979 ==
Hasler joined The North London Invaders in 1976, which at the time consisted of Mike Barson (keyboards), Chris Foreman (guitar), Lee Thompson (saxophone), and Cathal Smyth (bass). They were soon joined by Dikran Tulaine on vocals, before he was replaced by Graham "Suggs" McPherson, who was hired by Hasler. Hasler switched from drums to lead vocals in 1978, when Suggs was briefly kicked out of the group. Hasler only played two confirmed gigs as lead singer with The Invaders, both of which Suggs was in attendance of; he had been eager to rejoin the band, and when Hasler went on holiday to France that same year, the band called on Suggs to fill-in, eventually replacing Hasler. Hasler subsequently became their manager.

== Madness: 1979–1988 ==
In 1979, with Hasler as manager, the North London Invaders, now called Madness, signed to Stiff Records, and released their first, "The Prince", in August 1979, taken from their debut album, One Step Beyond..., released in the October alongside a single of the same name. In August 1979, Hasler was squating with others in King's Cross. He hid £350 of the bands savings behind a loose brick, which was stolen by his flatmate Barry Watford, before it was retrieved by Barson and Smyth. Hasler is credited on the bands first album as a "minder", and also co-wrote the track "Believe Me" with Barson.

In November 1979, Hasler stopped managing Madness. A year later, Hasler returns to the band to help run their fan club, the Madness Information Service. In 1986, Madness disbanded, and a year later, Suggs, Smash, Thompson and Foreman formed The Madness. Hasler helped out the band by playing drums with them on Friday Night Live. In 1988, Hasler appeared as the drummer for the music video of Madness' single "I Pronounce You", although he did not play on the recording.

=== Impact on Madness ===
According to Foreman, Hasler "was the drummer – terrible. Then he was the singer – awful. Finally he was the manager – appalling." However, he also called Hasler "pivotal" in the making of Madness, also stating "he was the first to start writing songs, plus he brought a lot of people into the band. In fact he was pivotal really. He’s very important in linking the band, and people forget that. He brought the players together. If (he) hadn’t been around we wouldn’t have had a singer, a drummer or a decent bass player. All I knew was Mike (Barson) and Lee(Thompson)." The band thought it would be funny for Hasler to sing Bed & Breakfast Man for a session track on the Radio 1 John Peel Show seeing as the lyrics were originally written about Hasler himself.

Some of the confirmed ways in which Hasler helped with the making of Madness include:

- Hasler was responsible for hiring Suggs into the band: "We spotted Suggs singing on his way out and he sounded pretty good. John Hasler was pretty savvy and said, ‘I think this guy can sing, you should try him out.’" (Mike Barson)
- He brought Cathal "Carl" Smyth into the band as a bassist (he later became a vocalist/trumpeter), and later on, Hasler sent a postcard to him addressed to Chas Smash, and according to Smyth "the name just stuck."
- In 1978, Hasler suggested his friend, Mark Bedford, to join on bass guitar.

In addition, Hasler was the inspiration behind their song "Bed and Breakfast Man", featured on their One Step Beyond... album. According to Barson, John used to sleep on Chris Foreman's sofa, which inspired Foreman to start writing a song about a man who comes into the narrators home, sleeps on his sofa, and is fed.

== The Pogues: 1981–1983 ==
In 1981, Hasler joined The Nips, led by Shane MacGowan, as a snare drummer. He was also in a punk/ska band called Guns for Hire, which later evolved into Department S. In 1982, Hasler became the first drummer for MacGowan's new band, The Pogues. He was present at their first gig at 100 Club in London on Friday 29 October 1982. By March 1983, the band had signed with Stiff records and he had been replaced by Andrew Ranken.
