= Crunch! =

Studio album by The Nutty Boys
- Released: 8 May 1990
- Recorded: 1989
- Studios: Liquidator Studios; Pavilion Studios; E-Zee Hire Studios
- Genres: Ska; reggae
- Length: 30:04 (LP version); 36:07 (CD version)
- Label: Streetlink
- Producers: The Nutty Boys; Kevin Petrie

Singles from Crunch!
- 1. "It's OK, I’m A Policeman" Released: 7 December 1992; 2. "Magic Carpet" Released: 18 March 1996

Crunch! is the only studio album by the British ska band The Nutty Boys, being originally released on May 8th, 1990, on the label Link Records.

The Nutty Boys were a group consisting of Lee Thompson and Chris Foreman, both former members of Madness. They later recruited several musicians to the band to tour the album, such as Louis Vause on piano, Dave Lazaro on organ, Paul Tadman on bass, ‘Spider’ Johnson on drums, and Steve Annan on saxophone.

In 1996, Foreman formally changed their band name to Crunch!, and Foreman and Thompson started their own label, Magic Carpet Records, with all further releases being under the name and label.

== Background ==
Following the band Madness splitting in late 1986, its short-lived incarnation, The Madness, emerged the following year, consisting of original members Suggs, Cathal Smyth, saxophonist Lee Thompson, and guitarist Chris Foreman. They released their eponymous debut album The Madness in mid-1988. However, the album was hugely unsuccessful and soured relations between the band and the label, Virgin Records, who demanded new demos if the band were to stay on the label. Despite attempts to record a follow-up album, these sessions proved unsuccessful and the band were dropped by the label and dissolved again over the summer.

By late 1988, Thompson and Foreman began writing together as a pair with the intention of creating a new band. Having recorded a three-track demo tape, they sent this demo to major record labels in the hopes of a deal. While initially unsuccessful, they eventually were signed to Link Records. As such, they started recording the album in early 1989 in the Madness-owned Liquidator Studios with engineer and co-producer Kevin Petrie, with extra sessions being recorded at Pavilion Studios and E-Zee Hire Studios. While Thompson took on the role of lead vocals in addition to saxophone, Foreman took on programming and keyboards in addition to guitar.

They recorded 10 songs, including the lead track "Magic Carpet" (co-written by Suggs), which was one of the last songs written by The Madness. An early demo of the track "Whistle" has also surfaced with roughly the same backing track but with different lyrics and vocals by Carl Smyth, unofficially titled "Nice Ice Cream". Whilst working for Go! Discs as an A&R executive, Smyth regularly saw The Nutty Boys at gigs and during their recording of the album, as he also frequented Liquidator Studios at this time. It is unclear whether this demo was from early recording sessions of Crunch!, or from the last sessions of The Madness.

The recording process was relatively inexpensive and quick, using sampling and drum/bass machines. In an interview with Terry Hawton for Madzine (a Madness fanzine) published in April 1990, Foreman explained the recording process in more detail; "I don’t play the guitar much anymore. I write everything on keyboards and a few songs I just worked out on the spot. By using machines, we could do everything at home more or less exactly as it would be in a studio except it’s on 8-track instead of 24. You could change the key of things. If Lee wanted something shuffled around, it’s quite easy. It’s what they call these days ‘preproduction’! Within about two days, we'd done all the backing tracks – the drums, bass, keyboards, just the real structure of the songs. We were able to record it easily within ten days."

== Cover artwork ==
The cover artwork was done by Paul Clewley and Mark Ansell, with photography being done by Gavin Watson. The rear sleeve featured the lyrics to the songs, with "People" having its own sleeve. The album was dedicated to "The good ship Madness (1979–1989 R.I.P.) and all who sailed in her." In the 2002 re-released version, the album is dedicated to Ian Dury (1942–2000), who was a major influence of both Madness and The Nutty Boys.

== Track listing ==
Adapted from the album's liner notes. All original songs were co-written by Thompson and Foreman, with McPherson being credited on "Magic Carpet".

No.	Title	Writer(s)	Length
1.	"Magic Carpet"	Lee Thompson; Graham McPherson; Chris Foreman	3:10
2.	"(Always) The Innocent"	Thompson; Foreman	2:36
3.	"Daydreamers"	Thompson; Foreman	3:14
4.	"Complications"	Thompson; Foreman	3:14
5.	"Pop My Top"	Thompson; Foreman	2:26
6.	"Whistle"	Thompson; Foreman	2:58
7.	"Pipedream"	Thompson; Foreman	2:52
8.	"Für Elise"	Ludwig van Beethoven; arranged by The Nutty Boys	2:41
9.	"People"	Thompson; Foreman	3:01
10.	"You Got It!"	Thompson; Foreman	3:46

Bonus tracks on re-release
No.	Title	Writer(s)	Length
1.	"It's O.K. I'm A Policeman"	Thompson; Foreman	3:39
2.	"Just Dreamin'"	Thompson; Foreman	3:17
3.	"Whistling (Re-Mix)"	Thompson; Foreman	2:52
4.	"Magic Carpet Ridin' (Re-Mix)"	Thompson; Foreman	3:09
5.	"It's O.K. I'm A Policeman (Video Only)"	Thompson; Foreman	4:02
6.	"Magic Carpet (Video Only)"	Thompson; Foreman	4:00

== Singles ==
The album produced three singles:

- "Daydreamers", France, 1990
- "It's O.K. I'm A Policeman", December 7, 1992
- "Magic Carpet" (released as Crunch!), March 18, 1996

== Personnel ==
Credits are adapted from the album's liner notes.

The Nutty Boys

- Lee Thompson – saxes, vocals
- Chris Foreman – guitars, keyboards, programming

Technical

- The Nutty Boys – production, concept
- Kevin Petrie – co-production; engineer, mixing
- Lucy Blundun – engineer on "(Always) The Innocent"
- Paul Clewley – artwork
- Mark Ansell – artwork
- Pen & Inc. – artwork
- Gavin "Acid Skin" Watson – photography

Other individuals thanked include the following:

- Sean Flowerdew (Staccato Records)
- Steve Nieve
- Chris Simpson (Roland U.K.)
- Jim at Project Music
- Pascal Gabriel
- Mark and Laurie (Link Records)
- Yamaha Pulse
- Wendy May (Loco Motion)
- Cass
- Royal Bank of Scotland (Camden)
- Ian McCane (Red Corner)
- Erica Blair (Blue Corner)

== Reception ==
Professional ratings
Review scores
Source	Rating
Q	3/4 stars
AllMusic	3/5 stars
Trouser Press	favourable

Although the album didn't chart, it received moderate commercial and critical success, with many viewing it as superior to its predecessor The Madness and welcoming the album's return to ska and reggae influences.

Q Magazine gave the album 3 out of 4 stars, saying "The latest attempt to revive the nuttiest sound around is a much more satisfactory effort than 1988’s reincarnation as The Madness. They've returned to their ska roots to produce an album of thoroughly likeable songs that recaptures the spirit and humour (if not quite the sheer brilliance) that was the essential part of hits such as "House of Fun", "Night Boat to Cairo" and "Baggy Trousers". With Thompson's rasping sax and vocals mixed well to the fore they skank their merry way through nine original compositions, one of which is a collaboration with Suggs McPherson and a re-run of "Für Elise" which receives a similarly syncopated treatment to the wonderful "Return of the Los Palmas 7". As always the tune is the thing, but a closer inspection of the lyrics – which deal with everything from Bill and Ben to drug abuse – are loaded with wit and homespun wisdom."

Darryl Cater of AllMusic gave the album 3 out of 5 stars, retrospectively stating: "The Nutty Boys are guitarist Chris Foreman and saxophonist Lee Thompson, who were two-sevenths of the popular British pop band Madness. Unfortunately, the music also sounds rather like a fraction of Madness. Their manic, danceable synth-pop has retained the silliness and the ska bounce of their old group, but little else. Thompson's raspy half-singing makes painfully obvious the absence of Madness vocalist Suggs McPherson. Foreman's noisily repetitive drum machines and synthesizers make it equally clear why he stuck to his guitars in the previous band. Occasionally, though, the Nutty Boys capture the melodic wackiness that made Madness special (as on the silly reworking of Beethoven's "Für Elise")."
