= Zarjazz =

- Parent company: Virgin Records
- Founded: 1984
- Founder: Madness
- Defunct: 1986
- Status: Defunct
- Genre: Jazz; ska; pop
- Country of origin: UK
- Location: London, England

Zarjazz was a record label and sub-label of Virgin Records.

Zarjazz was formed in 1984 by Madness, a British ska band. The label's first release was Feargal Sharkey's hit single "Listen to Your Father", on which Madness (minus Suggs) performed as Sharkey's backing band. Zarjazz also achieved success with album and single releases by Madness themselves, and with the charity record "Starvation" (credited as Starvation) featuring members of Madness, UB40, the Pioneers and General Public. The record label dissolved in 1986. Other Zarjazz artists were the Fink Brothers (Suggs and Chas Smash), Charm School, and Tom Morley.

The label was run from an office on Caledonian Road in North London, which also housed Liquidator Studios. Madness still owns the building, but they are currently renting it out as a location for ClueQuest, an escape room company.

== See also ==
- List of record labels
