= Lee Thompson (saxophonist) =

English multi-instrumentalist, songwriter, and composer (born 1957)

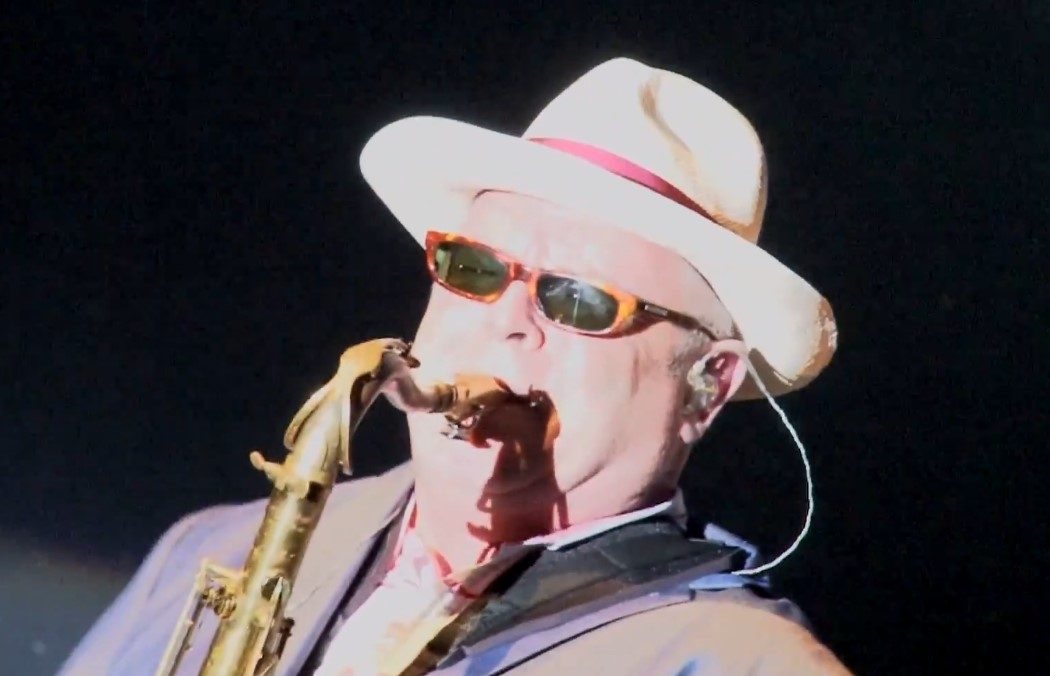
- Thompson performing live with Madness in 2013

Background information
- Born: Lee Jay Thompson; 5 October 1957 (age 69); St Pancras, London, England
- Origin: Finchley, Middlesex, England
- Genres: Ska; pop; new wave; 2-tone
- Occupations: Multi-instrumentalist; singer; songwriter; composer
- Instruments: Saxophone; flute; trumpet; flugelhorn; vocals
- Years active: 1976–present
- Label: RMS
- Member of: Madness; The Lee Thompson Ska Orchestra
- Formerly of: Crunch
- Website: leethompsonska.com

Lee Jay Thompson (born 5 October 1957), nicknamed Kix or El Thommo, is an English multi-instrumentalist, singer, songwriter, and composer. In a career spanning five decades, Thompson came to prominence in the late 1970s as a founder of, and saxophonist with, the English ska band Madness.

== Early years ==
Lee Thompson was born in St Pancras, London. His parents met in Great Yarmouth in post-World War II 1940s, where his mother had moved to so she could work as a waitress. They got married "around the time of the Queen’s coronation, and then they had me a few years later." Thompson's father, Fred, died at fifty-seven years old, and spent twenty-five years of his life in prison. According to Lee, his father being in prison for most of his childhood, combined with his mother's inability to control him, Thompson was "a right naughty boy. I was very cheeky and a bit of a Tasmanian devil, all over the place, no concentration span; I’m still the same, but I’ve sort of refined it a bit."

Thompson was very disruptive at school, and he claims "I just used to turn up, get marked in and go straight down the arcade. I was meant to be at Burleigh school but I didn’t go much." His only interests in school were English and Art, and as a youth had a gardening job, which also pulled him away from attending school.

Thompson lived at Gospel Oak, then to Kentish Town, and then to Holly Lodge estate. It was at Holly Lodge where he met another boy called Robbie Chapman, with whom he used to get into "some pretty serious trouble". From the age nine, he would commit petty crimes, including burgalry, and from ages ten to fourteen, he made thirteen court appearances. Because of his behaviour, most parents, including Mike Barson's parents, told their children to not interact with Lee. On one occasion, he left a window open to Haverstock School, and, with his father as the getaway driver, drove Lee and his cousin to school and stole "two or three dozen boxes of musical instruments." Although all the instruments were sold, Lee claims he only did this to obtain a flute he wanted to learn, but which he then gave up after only six months.

His time committing petty crimes came to a head in October 1971, when on his fourteenth birthday, he stole £200 out of a purse in Whiston Hospital. He was caught five days later and he was sent to numerous youth detention centres, including Stamford House and Chafford School, from November 1971 until January 1973. While at Chafford, he started listening to music, and was inspired by Andy Mackay, saxophonist for Roxy Music. After he left Chafford, he discovered his parents had moved to Luton, so he decided to stay with his uncle Jack in Highgate, and began spending more time with Barson and Chris Foreman, who according to Lee "took me by the hand, pulled me to one side and told me to try music instead of a crowbar – and the rest is history." After leaving school, Thompson resumed his gardening job. He also worked as a painter and decorator.

Prior to forming Madness, Thompson and future Madness keyboardist Mike Barson gained some notoriety as graffiti artists in the mid-1970s. After reading about the emerging New York graffiti scene, they spray-painted their nicknames ("Kix" and "Mr B") along with two friends' names "Cat" and "Columbo" around North London. They managed to spray their nicknames on George Melly's garage door, prompting Melly to write a newspaper article declaring: "If I ever catch that Mr B, Kix and Columbo, I'm going to kick their arses". Thompson chose the name "Kix" from the Adrenaline kicks he would get graffitiing.

== Music career ==
=== Madness ===
Thompson founded Madness as The North London Invaders with Mike Barson and Chris Foreman in 1976. He left briefly in 1977 after Barson criticised his sax playing, but reconciled and rejoined the same year. He wrote the group's debut single, "The Prince". Among the other songs, he wrote or co-wrote the singles "Embarrassment", "House of Fun", and "Uncle Sam". His experiences of being a petty criminal and serving time in borstal in his youth, inspired his lyrics for "Land of Hope and Glory" and "One's Second Thoughtlessness", the latter an unusual diversion into synth-pop for the group. Thompson performed lead vocals on both tracks. He also sang the vocals on his own composition, "Razor Blade Alley", which was a regular inclusion in early Madness shows. "Embarrassment" was written when he heard that his teenager sister, Tracy, was pregnant with a black man's child.

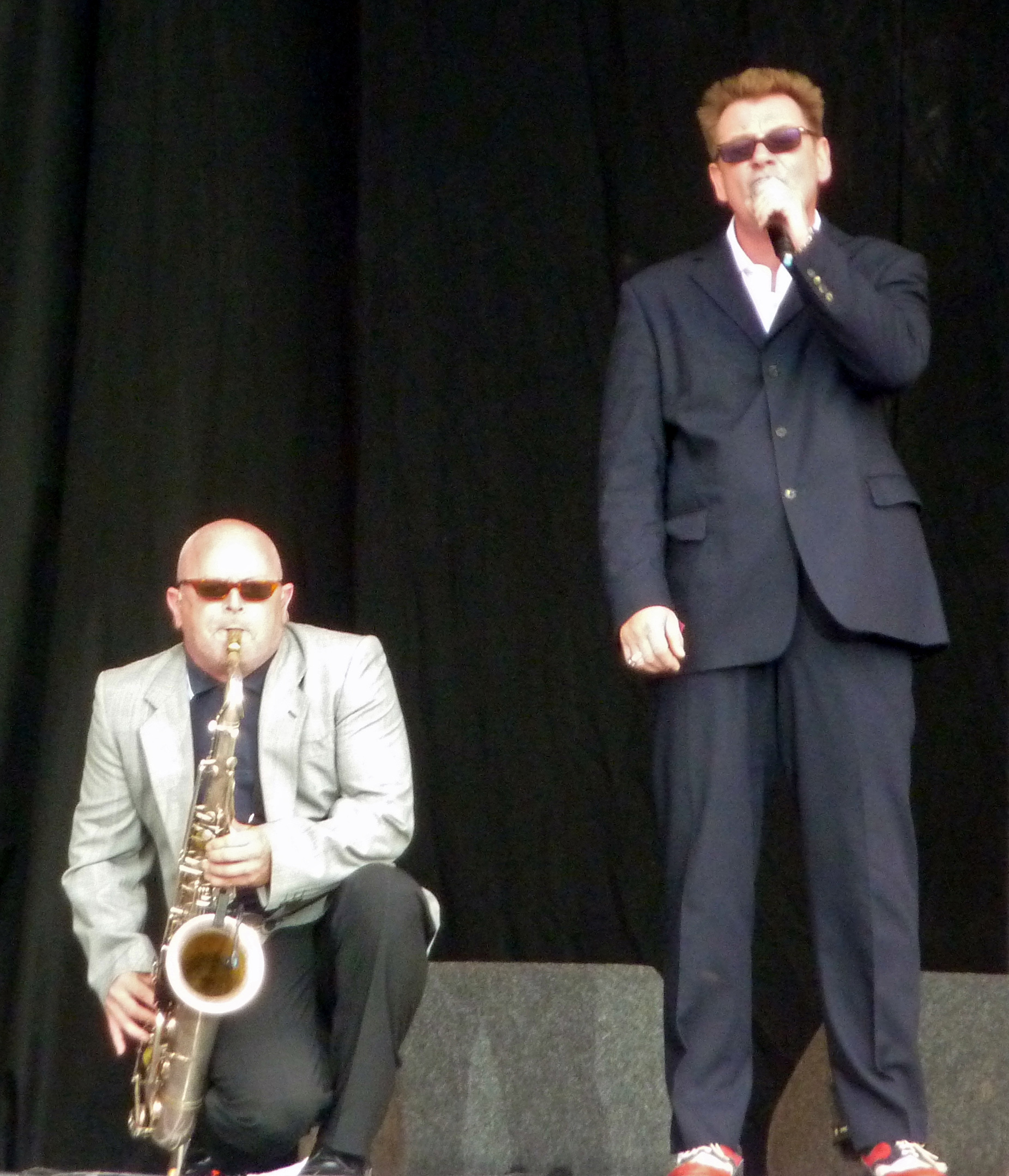
Thompson (left) performing on stage with Madness, next to Chas Smash, in 2009

After Madness disbanded in 1986, Thompson formed a new band The Madness with Foreman, Suggs and Chas Smash, but they broke up after releasing one album in 1988.

Thompson reunited with all seven original Madness members in 1992. Thompson was featured floating while playing a red, white, and blue-colored saxophone while the band performing at the closing ceremonies of the 2012 Summer Olympics, a direct reference to the bands music video for "Baggy Trousers", where he is seen floating in the air during parts of the song.

=== The Nutty Boys/Crunch! ===
After The Madness broke up, Thompson then joined forces with Foreman in late 1988, and the pair began to write songs. They soon recorded an album at Liquidator Studios with Thompson on vocals and saxophone and Foreman playing the other instruments. This album, Crunch!, included the song "Magic Carpet", which was co-written with Suggs and originally intended to be included on the follow up album to The Madness. They then formed a band called "The Nutty Boys" for further live appearances in the early 1990s and since then. In 1996, Foreman formally changed their band name to Crunch!, and Foreman and Thompson started their own label, Magic Carpet Records, with all further releases and gigs being under the name and label.

During this time, Thompson often spent the early hours flyposting in the East End of London with Mark Sexbery, a part-time keyboard player of The Nutty Boys. This nearly got him in trouble with the local authorities, but Thompson stopped once the Madstock concerts in 1992 beckoned. Thompson also regularly visited fellow ex-Madness member Mike Barson in Amsterdam during this time, where they started writing songs during the band's interim period and throughout the rest of the 1990s, most of which ended up on subsequent Madness albums, such as "Lovestruck" and "Drip Fed Fred".

=== The Dance Brigade ===
Thompson founded The Dance Brigade with Keith Finch in 2007, and they were joined by Jennie Matthias of The Belle Stars. The other musicians came from projects that they had all been involved in. He also fronted and played saxophone with a covers band called The Camden Cowboys.

=== The Lee Thompson Ska Orchestra ===
In 2011, Thompson began performing with The Lee Thompson Ska Orchestra, with a lineup that included Madness bandmate Mark Bedford. They released their debut album, The Benevolence of Sister Mary Ignatius, in 2013. They released the single "Fu Man Chu" featuring Bitty McLean from this album and, in February 2014, released the follow-up single "Bangarang" featuring Dawn Penn and Sharon Shannon.

The Silencerz

Since 2013, Thompson has often made guest appearances with 9-piece band The Silencerz with his son Daley on lead vocals. His saxophone can be heard on the band's newly released album.

== Personal life ==
In 1984, Thompson married Debbie (née Fordham). They have three children. Thompson is 5'6 tall.

In 2021 Thompson's autobiography, Growing Out Of It: Machinations Before Madness was released.

== Discography ==
Madness

The Lee Thompson Ska Orchestra

- The Benevolence of Sister Mary Ignatius (2013)
- Bite the Bullet (2016)
