= Total Madness =

Greatest hits album by Madness
- Released: 21 September 2009
- Recorded: 1979–2009
- Genres: Ska; pop
- Length: 71:44
- Label: Union Square
- Producers: Clive Langer; Alan Winstanley

Madness chronology
The Liberty of Norton Folgate (2009)	Total Madness (2009)	Ultimate Madness (2010)

Total Madness is a compilation CD/DVD album by the English ska and pop band Madness, released on 21 September 2009 by Union Square Music. It is principally a singles collection, though it also includes two album tracks from their debut album, One Step Beyond.... On release in the UK it reached #11 in the Official Album Charts, making it Madness' second hit album of 2009, the second being The Liberty of Norton Folgate (#5).

Due to licensing problems, none of the four singles that Madness released on Zarjazz Records in 1985-86 are included.

The album effectively supersedes the now deleted Divine Madness collection. Total Madness should not be confused with the earlier US-only Total Madness — The Very Best of Madness.

== Promotion ==
Union Square put significant effort into the album's promotion. As well as a TV advert campaign, a large billboard featuring the album's cover was erected on Hanger Lane in London. In addition, there was a flyering campaign during the band's performance at Regent Street festival, and also an old AEC Routemaster bus was recommissioned and redecorated to match the vehicle on the album cover. This bus made several appearances on Madness' 2009 Christmas Tour. This makes Total Madness one of the most heavily promoted Madness albums since their reunion in 1992.

== Track listing ==
The collection comprises a CD and DVD sold as a single package.

CD - The hits
No.	Title	Writer(s)	Original release	Length
1.	"One Step Beyond"	Cecil Campbell	One Step Beyond..., 1979	2:19
2.	"Baggy Trousers"	Graham McPherson, Chris Foreman	Absolutely, 1980	2:27
3.	"House of Fun"	Lee Thompson, Mike Barson	Complete Madness, 1982	2:45
4.	"Our House"	Cathal Smyth, Foreman	The Rise & Fall, 1982	3:10
5.	"Embarrassment"	Thompson, Barson	Absolutely	3:04
6.	"My Girl"	Barson	One Step Beyond...	2:41
7.	"It Must Be Love"	Labbi Siffre	Non-album single, 1981	3:20
8.	"Wings of a Dove"	Smyth, McPherson	Non-album single, 1983	2:59
9.	"The Sun and the Rain"	Barson	Non-album single, 1983	3:28
10.	"Grey Day"	Barson	7, 1981	3:38
11.	"NW5"	Thompson, Barson	The Liberty of Norton Folgate, 2009	3:48
12.	"Cardiac Arrest"	Smyth, Foreman	7	2:52
13.	"Tomorrow's Just Another Day"	Smyth, Barson	The Rise & Fall	3:14
14.	"Driving in My Car"	Barson	Non-album single, 1982	3:18
15.	"Bed and Breakfast Man"	Barson	One Step Beyond...	2:31
16.	"Lovestruck"	Thompson, Barson	Wonderful, 1999	3:50
17.	"One Better Day"	McPherson, Mark Bedford	Keep Moving, 1984	4:01
18.	"Michael Caine"	Smyth, Dan Woodgate	Keep Moving	3:34
19.	"The Return of the Los Palmas 7"	Barson, Bedford, Woodgate	Absolutely	2:33
20.	"The Prince"	Thompson	One Step Beyond...	3:20
21.	"Shut Up"	McPherson, Foreman	7	2:51
22.	"Madness"	Campbell	One Step Beyond...	2:38
23.	"Night Boat to Cairo"	McPherson, Barson	One Step Beyond...	3:24
Total length:				71:44

Digital download bonus tracks
No.	Title	Writer(s)	Original release	Length
24.	"Johnny the Horse"	Smyth	Wonderful	3:21
25.	"Drip Fed Fred"	Thompson, Barson	Wonderful	4:31
Total length:				79:36

DVD - The music videos

- The DVD contains the same 23 tracks, and in the same order, as the CD.

== Charts ==
Chart (2009)	Peak position
UK Albums (Official Charts)	11

== Certifications and sales ==
Region	Certification	Certified units/sales
United Kingdom (BPI)	Platinum	300,000^{‡}
^{‡} Sales+streaming figures based on certification alone.
