= Divine Madness (Madness album) =

1992 compilation album by Madness

Greatest hits album by Madness
- Released: 24 February 1992
- Recorded: 1979–1986 (re-release 1979–1999)
- Genres: Ska; pop
- Length: 71:30
- Label: Virgin

Madness chronology
It's... Madness Too (1991)	Divine Madness (1992)	Madstock! (1992)

Divine Madness is a greatest hits album by the English ska/pop band Madness, released by Virgin Records on 24 February 1992. Released more than five years after the band had broken up, the album was a critical and commercial success in the UK, reaching number one on the UK Albums Chart, and the renewed interest in the band led to a Madness reunion and their first concert in six years (which was recorded for their Madstock! album).

== Content ==
The album presents the group's UK single A-sides from 1979 to 1986 in chronological order, although their cover version of "Sweetest Girl" is omitted, being the only Madness single of this era which did not reach the top 30 in the UK. Some tracks are also presented in their LP versions, rather than the single versions. The 1992/1995 Japanese CD versions add the UK B-side "In the City", which was released as a single in Japan, having been used to promote Honda City cars.

== Releases ==
Divine Madness was also released as a video and eventually a DVD with all Madness music videos, including the album track "Bed & Breakfast Man", the omitted single "Sweetest Girl", and the 1988 single "I Pronounce You" (released by four of the band members under the name "The Madness"). The group's Japanese TV adverts for Honda City cars were also included.

The album was re-packaged in 1998 as The Heavy Heavy Hits, with the addition of the single version of "Sweetest Girl", placed in its correct chronological position between "Uncle Sam" and "(Waiting For) The Ghost Train".

In 2000 it was re-issued, under its original title of Divine Madness, with the further 1999 singles "Lovestruck" and "Johnny the Horse" included, but once again omitting "Sweetest Girl". The album versions of "The Prince", "One Step Beyond...", "The Return of the Los Palmas 7", "Cardiac Arrest", "Shut Up" and "Tomorrow's Just Another Day" were replaced with the single versions, although the heavily edited version of "Shut Up" was used, which, at 2:51, fades out more than 30 seconds short of the actual single version.

== Promotion ==
Divine Madness was promoted with television advertisements on the various ITV companies in the UK, advertisements in the music press and national newspapers, and a poster campaign. The single "It Must Be Love" was re-released ahead of the album.

The members of Madness reunited to help promote the record. Bassist Mark Bedford told Select, "Virgin told us they wanted to release it, whatever we said. So we thought, either go nowhere near it, or get really involved so people get something decent. And because of Carl really geeing everyone up, we've decided to be a part of it."

Eventually, although still living in Holland, keyboard player Mike Barson also became involved. In March 1992, he stated in Q Magazine, "The past is gone and I’m looking forward to the future, but I have fond memories of Madness. From the music point of view, I think we did pretty well. The music we were making stayed pretty pure. The only regret I have is that some people saw us as this gross cartoon band. You can appreciate why people may have thought that, but I think that’s missing the subtlety of what we did."

== Critical reception ==
Professional ratings
Review scores
Source	Rating
AllMusic	4/5 stars
Encyclopedia of Popular Music	5/5 stars
NME	9/10
Q	4/5 stars
Select	5/5 stars
Vox	10/10

Terry Staunton of NME stated that "it would be a mistake to think of them as nothing more than jovial popsters", noting that "they grew up, and Madness meaning nuttiness soon became Madness meaning neurosis". Despite this, "the hits kept coming", and he concluded that, "Divine Madness is a perfect legacy to the greatest pop group of the last decade". In Melody Maker David Bennun wrote that after their early ska hits, Madness became "spectacularly good" at writing songs, saying, "There are tracks on here no home should be without ... each one a three-minute marvel". He concluded by saying, "These songs make you feel good. They leave you happier for having heard them... So what price good-humoured melodic genius?" Peter Kane commented in Q that Madness's hits "grew steadily in sophistication while retaining the vernacular drive that was sometimes silly, sometimes sad, often blackly humorous and always very, very English", concluding that although the later songs were not so popular, "their legacy ... can withstand almost any inspection". Andrew Harrison of Select called the album "a great place to watch them grow up" and stating that by the end of the record, "fine pop writing has turned into great pop writing". In Vox, Keith Cameron noted that Divine Madness did not include the album tracks featured on Complete Madness and Utter Madness "and thus barely wastes a single digital nanosecond". He described Madness as "the most prolific, consistent... heck, just the best pop phenomenon of their time" and said that "the bulk of this material hasn't aged a bit".

== Track listing ==
1. "The Prince" from One Step Beyond...
2. "One Step Beyond" from One Step Beyond...
3. "My Girl" from One Step Beyond...
4. "Night Boat to Cairo" from One Step Beyond...
5. "Baggy Trousers" from Absolutely
6. "Embarrassment" from Absolutely
7. "The Return of the Los Palmas 7" from Absolutely
8. "Grey Day" from 7
9. "Shut Up" from 7
10. "It Must Be Love" Single release only
11. "Cardiac Arrest" from 7
12. "House of Fun" from Complete Madness
13. "Driving in My Car" Single release only
14. "Our House" from The Rise & Fall
15. "Tomorrow's Just Another Day" from The Rise & Fall
16. "Wings of a Dove" Single release only
17. "The Sun and the Rain" Single release only
18. "Michael Caine" from Keep Moving
19. "One Better Day" from Keep Moving
20. "Yesterday's Men" from Mad Not Mad
21. "Uncle Sam" from Mad Not Mad
22. "(Waiting for the) Ghost Train" from Utter Madness

== Chart performance ==
Chart (1992)	Peak position
Australian Albums (ARIA)	37
Dutch Albums (Album Top 100)	56
New Zealand Albums (RMNZ)	7
UK Albums (Official Charts)	1

== Certifications and sales ==
Region	Certification	Certified units/sales
France (SNEP)	2× Gold	200,000^{*}
United Kingdom (BPI)	3× Platinum	900,000^{^}
^{*} Sales figures based on certification alone.^{^} Shipments figures based on certification alone.
