= Our House (musical) =

- Music: Madness
- Lyrics: Madness
- Book: Tim Firth
- Productions: 2002 West End; 2006 Japanese tour 2008 UK Tour; 2011 UK Tour; 2012 UK Gala Performance; 2013 New UK Tour; 2017 UK Tour
- Awards: Laurence Olivier Award for Best New Musical

Our House is a musical with music and lyrics by Madness and one song "It Must Be Love" written by Labi Siffre and a book by playwright Tim Firth. Premiering at The Cambridge Theatre in 2002, Our House was the winner of the 2003 Olivier award for Best New Musical and has since gone on to tour both nationally and internationally to great acclaim. Through the music of Madness, writer Tim Firth explores the themes of love, family values, growing up, responsibility and dealing with losing the people that shape us.

== Background ==
Our House has many obvious influences including Willy Russell's Blood Brothers and the 1998 romantic comedy film Sliding Doors. Some critics have even called the show the British answer to Rent, the Jonathan Larson rock opera which follows the lives of a group of 20-something year-olds living in New York. For many years prior to the creation of Our House, Madness had been considering ways that they could turn their songs into a musical. Following the phenomenal success of Mamma Mia!, featuring the music of ABBA, a new interest in so-called 'jukebox musicals' began to develop.

During initial publicity for the show in 2002, The band's lead-singer, Suggs admitted in an interview for the BBC that he was not particularly a fan of musical theatre, saying; "I can't say I'm a huge fan of musicals. I like music, and I like acting. I like Oliver!, I went to see that when I was a kid and West Side Story and maybe a few little bits and pieces over the years, but no, not a huge fan of musicals, no." Tim Firth was approached by producers to write the script for the show, accepting the offer as he was a fan of Madness. Speaking to What's on Stage in 2002, Firth commented; "I'd always thought there was an irony that everyone remembered Madness as the nutty boys, but that was generated largely by the videos. The songs were actually just witty. And moving. And about something. And felt like they were part of a musical already. I still don't think I wrote the book of Our House. I found it.".

== Production history ==
=== World premiere: West End (2002-03) ===
Our House was first staged at the Cambridge Theatre in the West End from 28 October 2002 to 16 August 2003. Michael Jibson made his professional debut as Joe Casey and was nominated for a 2003 Laurence Olivier Award for Best Actor in a Musical. Direction was by Matthew Warchus with choreography by Peter Darling. For a time, the production team struggled to find a performer suitable to play Joe's love interest, Sarah. The problem was solved when Michael Jibson suggested Julia Gay, his classmate at Guildford School of Acting. Madness' lead-singer Suggs was cast for a short period in the role of Joe's Dad, a role which was also played by prolific stage actor Ian Reddington.

The production won the 2003 Laurence Olivier Award for Best New Musical. However, due to poor ticket sales it closed after less than 10 months.

=== UK tour (2008-09) ===
A UK tour began at the Birmingham Repertory Theatre in June 2008 with Chris Carswell playing the lead role of Joe Casey and Steve Brookstein as Joe's Dad. The tour continued ending in Crawley in March 2009.

The touring production changed aspects of the show in reaction to criticism of show's début in the West End. House of Fun was replaced with "Los Palmas 7" as the opening of the show. "Sarah's Song" was also replaced with the new Madness hit "NW5".

=== 10th Anniversary Concert (2012) ===
Our House returned to London's West End on 11 November 2012 for a one off Gala performance at the Savoy Theatre, celebrating the show's 10th anniversary. The performance was directed by Warchus in aid of Help for Heroes. Suggs played the role of Joe's Dad.

=== International productions ===
==== Asia ====
A new production of the show toured Japan in July 2006, starting in Tokyo.

The show was performed in Ramat Gan, Israel, by the Beit Zvi Company in May 2010.

==== Australia ====
In May 2014 it premiered in Australia in a production by the University of Melbourne Music Theatre Association (UMMTA). It was then performed by the Regional Institute of Performing Arts in 2015, from 10 to 12 December at the Newcastle Civic Playhouse.

=== 2013 UK Tour ===
The New Wolsey Theatre Company, based in Ipswich, toured the UK with a production of Our House, starring Alexis Gerred, Daniella Bowen & Steve Dorsett in Autumn 2013.

=== 2015 UK Fringe Production ===
Directed by Michael Burgen at the Union Theatre, London, the musical ran from 19 August – 12 September. Starring Steven France as Joe and Ailsa Davidson as Sarah. Choreography by Will Whelton and musical direction by Richard Baker.

The full 2015 cast: Steve France as Joe Casey, Dom Brewer as Joe's Dad, Ailsa Davidson as Sarah, Sally Samad as Kath Casey, Joseph Giacone as Emmo, Joe Ashman as Lewis, Jay Osborne as Reecey, Rhys Owen as Mr Pressman, Claire Learie as Billie and Chanice Alexander-Burnett as Angie. Other cast members include: Zachary Worrall, Alice Baker, Rachel Capp, Reece Kerridge, Lauren Dinse, Paul Flannigan and Joanna Bird.

=== 2017 UK Tour ===
Directed by James Tobias and produced by Immersion Theatre & Damian Tracey Productions, Our House started touring on 10 August 2017 at the Lyceum Theatre, Crewe and ended on 25 November 2017 at the Wycombe Swan, High Wycombe. The musical called at various towns and cities throughout the UK including Swansea, Portsmouth, Sheffield, Blackpool, Coventry, Hastings, Weymouth, Glasgow and Bromley. This production starred George Sampson as Reecey and Deena Payne as Kath Casey, along with Jason Kajdi as Joe Casey, Sophie Matthew as Sarah and Callum McCardle as Joe's Dad. The show's choreography was by Fabian Aloise.

== Plot ==
This synopsis is based on the 2008 UK Tour version.

=== Act 1 ===
Camden lad Joe Casey arrives to his house, later joined by his best friends Emmo and Lewis, his girlfriend Sarah, and her best friends Billie and Angie, where a party has been organised by his mother, Kath, for his sixteenth birthday ("Our House"). After the party, wanting to impress Sarah, Joe breaks into a building site to show her his street, Casey Street, from above. When the police arrive, Joe convinces Sarah to run away and is left with the decision of whether to run away or give himself up. The story splits into two paths revealed by the ghost of Joe's dead criminal dad: the right path where Joe gives himself up, and the wrong path where he runs away ("Simple Equation").

On the wrong path, Joe escapes the police but is berated by Sarah, and looked down upon by Dad. Joe, Emmo and Lewis drown their sorrows at the pub ("My Girl"). When Joe wakes up, he encounters Reecey, the school hardman, who offers Joe an opportunity to leave school and get involved with a "business idea" he has ("Baggy Trousers"). On the right path, the judge sentences Joe to go to a young offender institution. Joe is subsequently branded an embarrassment by neighbours and family members. Upon his release, Joe tries to get a job, but all of his interviews fail when he reveals that he is a young offender ("Embarrassment").

On the wrong path, Joe accepts Reecey's offer to work for him and they run a scam alarm company. Emmo and Lewis disapprove of Joe and Reecey's business, but are eventually convinced the business is a good idea when they experience some of the perks of Joe's lavish lifestyle ("Embarrassment – Reprise (Encouragement Version)"). On the right path, Joe has gotten a humiliating job wearing a sign pointing to a golf shop. Reecey offers to let Joe borrow one of his stolen cars, which Joe declines but it also gives him an idea; he rents a low quality car which Billie and Angie laugh at but Sarah loves ("Driving in my Car"). Sarah thanks Joe and invites him to a charity ball and offers to pay for a dinner jacket. He declines and Sarah is devastated ("My Girl - Reprise (Ballad Version)").

On the wrong path, Joe has started a building business, as well as a limousine business for Emmo and Lewis. Joe, Emmo and Lewis go out for drinks, and their waiter is Sarah, who they have not seen since school. Sarah criticises Joe's selfishness and his decision to run away from the building site when he asks about the charity ball, but confirms that he can come if he wants to. On the right path, Reecey approaches Joe as he walks home from work and convinces him to attempt to burgle a house ("Simple Equation - Reprise").

On the wrong path, Billie, Angie, Sarah, and her new friend Callum are at the charity ball. Joe arrives at the ball with a large donation, and he and Sarah dance ("The Return of the Los Palmas 7"). On the right path, Joe and Reecey are caught by the police, and each blames the other for the crime ("Shut Up"). Emmo and Lewis call Sarah, who arrives with Callum. The situation escalates, with Joe eventually punching Callum and a policeman. Joe says he wishes he had never met Sarah, causing her to storm off. Joe is sent back to prison. Meanwhile, on the wrong path, Joe and Sarah share a kiss, having rekindled their relationship ("Tomorrow's (Just Another Day)/The Sun and the Rain").

=== Act 2 ===
On the wrong path, Joe and Sarah are on a gondola, on their way to get married in Las Vegas ("Night Boat To Cairo"). While there, Joe encounters Mr Pressman, who gives Joe his business card. Joe and Sarah get married and a paradise wedding party ensues ("Wings of a Dove"). On the right path, Joe is released from prison, but doesn't go home. Kath is worried for him, as she now has two family members who went to prison and never came home ("One Better Day"). Mr Pressman meets with Kath to try and convince her to move out of 25 Casey Street so he can build it up; she refuses. Joe overhears Pressman's plans to get rid of number 25, and is now determined to track down Mr Pressman with a new mission: save 25 Casey Street ("Rise and Fall").

On both paths, Joe arrives at Mr Pressman's office ("House of Fun"). On the wrong path, Mr Pressman explains to Joe his plan to vacate and build up 25 Casey Street. Joe agrees to get Kath out of the house. On the right path, Joe enters Mr Pressman's office to argue against his plans, but Pressman doesn't pay attention to Joe.

On the wrong path, while at dinner, Joe reveals his plans to move Kath out of Casey Street and rebuild it as Casey Boulevard. Lewis disagrees with Joe and leaves dinner. Joe looks to Sarah for support, but she also disagrees with him. Joe angrily leaves and Sarah laments on her feelings about Joe, remembering the night he ran away from the police. Meanwhile, Joe tells Mr Pressman he doesn't want to work on Casey Street anymore ("NW5"). On the right path, Joe looks for a lawyer, revealed to be Sarah, now engaged to Callum ("Embarrassment - Reprise (Law Firm)"). Joe decides he should find a different lawyer and leaves. Sarah realises she misses him and wants him back.

On the wrong path, Joe is waiting for Mr Pressman's demolition expert, who is revealed to be Reecey. Joe tells Reecey to break into 25 Casey Street while Kath is out ("Simple Equation – Reprise"). On the right path, Sarah finds Joe sleeping in the now disheveled Morris Minor and they discuss Joe's while thinking about how much they miss each other. She reveals that 25 Casey Street was gifted to the Casey family. Joe praises her investigative skills and they hug, more in love than ever ("It Must Be Love"). Sarah also reveals she didn't get married. Secretly elated, Joe decides to go home to his mother. On the wrong path, Emmo and Lewis tell Joe that Kath didn't get in the limousine because she wanted to wait for Joe. Realising she'll still be home when Reecey breaks in, Joe runs home ("The Sun and the Rain").

On both paths, Reecey sets fire to 25 Casey Street, and both Joes arrive as the house is burning down. On the right path, Kath is safe, much to the relief of Joe. On the wrong path, Kath dies in the fire. At her funeral, Lewis blames Joe for her death and one by one, the others leave. Joe is charged with arson and manslaughter after Reecey names him as an accomplice.

On the right path, Joe and Sarah get married. Joe talks with Kath, where he says he now understands his dad's situation better. He says he wishes he'd done things differently, to which his dad says that as long as he's with the people he loves, he's done the right thing. For a brief moment, Joe and Dad can finally hear each other. They share a touching moment as Dad leaves. Joe returns to the group for the wedding photo and the party ensues. Suddenly, Joe is thrust back to the night of the party and eventual break in. However, instead of breaking into the building site, he kisses Sarah before taking her out dancing ("Our House – Reprise").

== Original cast ==
Sources: Guide To Musical Theatre Tim Firth

- Michael Jibson – Joe Casey
- Richard Frame – Emmo
- Oliver Jackson – Lewis
- Hannah Tollman – Chemist/Policewoman/Harper
- Julia Gay – Sarah
- Tameka Empson – Billie
- Andrea Francis – Angie
- Peter Caulfield – Chemist/Neighbour/Caribbean Clergyman/Stall Holder
- James Beattie – Miss Clay/Joe's Solicitor/Toy Farm Interviewer/Jaguar Salesman
- Lesley Nicol – Kath Casey
- Paul Kemble – Priest/Mr Jesmond/Stall Holder/Clerk
- Lynden O'Neill – Uncle/London Alarms Boss/Barrister/Stall Holder
- Alison Forbes – Aunt/Guard/Mrs Pressman
- Andrew Spillett – Grandad/Custody Officer/Barman Dave/Lawyer/Ray
- Matt Cross – Reecey
- Ian Reddington – Joe's Dad
- Deborah Bundy – Council Solicitor/Neighbour
- Mark Hilton – Magistrate/Callum
- Mary Doherty – Custody Officer/House of Waffles Interviewer/Massey
- Dean Stobbart – Careers Officer/Weird Bloke
- Mike Scott – Mr Pressman
- Carryl Thomas – Heather/Smith
- Ruth Brown – Julie/Stall Holder
- Darren Smithers – Ensemble
- Oliver Tompsett – Swing

=== Original production team ===
- Director – Matthew Warchus
- Set – Rob Howell
- Effects – Paul Kieve
- Lighting – Mark Henderson
- Sound – Rick Clarke
- Choreography – Peter Darling
- Orchestrations – Steve Sidwell
- Musical Director – Philip Bateman

== Musical numbers ==
=== 2002 West End ===
Act One

- "House of Fun" – Joe, Emmo, Lewis, Sarah, Billie, Angie and Chemist
- "Our House" – Joe and Company
- "Simple Equation" – Joe's Dad
- "My Girl" – Emmo, Joe and Lewis
- "Baggy Trousers" – Reecey, Joe and Company
- "Simple Equation – Reprise" – Joe's Dad
- "Prospects" – Joe, Receey, Sarah and Company
- "Embarrassment" – Joe and Company
- "Embarrassment – Reprise (Encouragement Version)" – Joe and Company
- "Driving in My Car" – Joe, Emmo, Lewis, Billie, Angie and Sarah
- "My Girl – Reprise (Ballad Version)" – Sarah and Joe's Dad
- "Simple Equation – Reprise" – Joe's Dad
- "The Return of the Los Palmas 7" – The Band
- "Shut Up" – Joe and Reecey
- "Tomorrow's (Just Another Day)" / "The Sun and the Rain" – Joe, Sarah, Joe's Dad and Company

Act Two

- "Night Boat to Cairo" – Weird Bloke
- "Wings of a Dove" – The Company
- "One Better Day" – Joe's Dad, Joe and Kath
- "Margate" ("White Heat") – Joe's Dad, Kath and Company
- "Rise and Fall" – Joe and Company
- " My Girl / Rise and Fall – Reprise – Mr Pressman and Company
- "Sarah's Song" – Sarah and Chorus
- "Embarrassment – Reprise (Law Firm)" – Joe and Solicitors
- "Sarah's Song (Reprise) – Sarah
- "Simple Equation – Reprise" – Joe's Dad
- "It Must Be Love"‡ – Sarah and Joe
- "The Sun and the Rain" – Joe and Company
- "Our House – Reprise" – The Company
- "Finale/Encore" – The Company

=== 2008 UK tour ===
- "Opening/Los Palmas 7"
- "Our House"
- "Simple Equation"
- "My Girl"
- "Simple Equation – Reprise"
- "All I Wanted" ("Michael Caine")
- "Baggy Trousers"
- "Embarrassment"
- "Embarrassment – Reprise (Encouragement Version)"
- "Driving in My Car"
- "My Girl – Reprise (Ballad Version)"
- "Simple Equation – Reprise"
- "The Return of the Los Palmas 7"
- "Shut Up"
- "Tomorrow's (Just Another Day)" / "The Sun and the Rain"
- "Night Boat to Cairo"
- "Wings of a Dove"
- "One Better Day"
- "Rise and Fall"
- "House of Fun"
- "NW5"
- "Embarrassment – Reprise (Law Firm)"
- "Simple Equation – Reprise"
- "It Must Be Love"‡
- "The Sun and the Rain"
- "Our House – Reprise"
- "Finale/Encore"

‡ Song originally by Labi Siffre

== Recording and video ==
The recorded original production was telecast on BBC Three in December 2003 and was released on DVD on 1 November 2004.

== Awards and nominations ==
=== Original London production ===
Year	Award	Category	Nominee	Result
2003	Laurence Olivier Award	Best New Musical		Won
2003	Laurence Olivier Award	Best Actor in a Musical	Michael Jibson	Nominated
2003	Laurence Olivier Award	Best Theatre Choreographer	Peter Darling	Nominated
