= Complete Madness =

Greatest hits album by Madness
- Released: 23 April 1982
- Recorded: 1979–1982
- Genre: Ska; pop; 2-tone
- Length: 45:24 (original); 47:24 (reissue)
- Label: Stiff
- Producer: Clive Langer; Alan Winstanley

Madness chronology
7 (1981)	Complete Madness (1982)	The Rise & Fall (1982)

Alternative cover
- Cover of the Virgin Records 1985 CD re-release

Singles from Complete Madness
- 1. "House of Fun" Released: 14 May 1982

Complete Madness is the first greatest hits album by the English ska and pop band Madness. It was released on 23 April 1982 and included Madness' biggest hits from their first three studio albums and the stand-alone singles. Complete Madness spent 99 weeks on the UK charts, peaking at number 1.

== Content ==
This compilation includes the original 7-inch single mixes of most tracks ("House of Fun" being an exception). The vinyl and initial CD releases have shortened fade-outs for many tracks, to reduce the running time of each side of the original LP version. The first time the songs appeared in full for this compilation was on the 2003 Virgin CD reissue.

The original Australian version of the album, issued some months later than in the UK, replaces "In the City" with 13th UK single "Driving in My Car".

== Music video ==
An accompanying video cassette was also released, containing all thirteen of the group's music videos up to that point (the twelve UK singles plus "Bed and Breakfast Man", which was a single in Canada), with specially filmed introductions to each video, together with the car commercials the band had done for Honda in Japan.

== Reception ==
Professional ratings
Review scores
Source	Rating
AllMusic	5/5 stars
Christgau's Record Guide	A−
Record Mirror	5/5 stars
The Rolling Stone Album Guide	3.5/5 stars
Sounds	5/5 stars

Reviewing Complete Madness for AllMusic, Stephen Thomas Erlewine deemed the compilation "thorough and thoroughly entertaining, encapsulating exactly why Madness were significant and, more importantly, how much fun their 'nutty sound' was", while also serving as "definitive proof that Madness were one of the great singles acts of their era."

== Track listing ==
The following track listing is for the original 1982 UK release (Stiff Records, HIT-TV1).

Side one
No.	Title	Writer(s)	Original release	Length
1.	"Embarrassment"	Mike Barson; Lee Thompson	Absolutely, 1980	2:59
2.	"Shut Up"	Graham McPherson; Chris Foreman	7, 1981	2:48
3.	"My Girl"	Barson	One Step Beyond..., 1979	2:38
4.	"Baggy Trousers"	McPherson; Foreman	Absolutely	2:26
5.	"It Must Be Love"	Labi Siffre	Non-album single, 1981	3:19
6.	"The Prince"	Thompson	One Step Beyond...	2:27
7.	"Bed and Breakfast Man"	Barson	One Step Beyond...	2:29
8.	"Night Boat to Cairo"	McPherson; Barson	One Step Beyond...	3:13
Total length:				22:24

Side two
No.	Title	Writer(s)	Original release	Length
1.	"House of Fun"	Barson; Thompson	New track	2:47
2.	"One Step Beyond"	Cecil Campbell	One Step Beyond...	2:17
3.	"Cardiac Arrest"	Cathal Smyth; Foreman	7	2:52
4.	"Grey Day"	Barson	7	3:30
5.	"Take It or Leave It"	Barson; Thompson	Absolutely	3:17
6.	"In the City"	McPherson; Barson; Smyth; Foreman; Bill Crutchfield; Daisuke Inoue	B-side of "Cardiac Arrest", 1982	2:55
7.	"Madness"	Campbell	One Step Beyond...	2:35
8.	"The Return of the Los Palmas 7"	Barson; Daniel Woodgate; Mark Bedford	Absolutely	2:29
Total length:				22:49

== Personnel ==
Madness

- Graham "Suggs" McPherson – vocals
- Mike Barson – keyboards, harmonica, vibraphone, marimba, tubular bells
- Chris Foreman – guitars
- Chas Smash – vocals, trumpet
- Lee Thompson – saxophones, vocals
- Mark Bedford – bass
- Dan Woodgate – drums, percussion

Production

- Clive Langer – producer
- Alan Winstanley – producer

== Chart performance ==
Chart (1982)	Peak position
UK Albums Chart	1
Australia (Kent Music Report)	2
Dutch Albums Chart	7
New Zealand Albums Chart	11

== Certifications and sales ==
Region	Certification	Certified units/sales
Australia (ARIA)	Platinum	50,000^{^}
United Kingdom (BPI)	Platinum	1,000,000^{^}
^{^} Shipments figures based on certification alone.
