= The Business – the Definitive Singles Collection =

The Business - the Definitive Singles Collection

Box set by Madness
- Released: 1993
- Recorded: 1979–1986
- Genre: Ska; pop
- Label: Virgin Records

Madness chronology
Madstock! (1992)	The Business - the Definitive Singles Collection (1993)	Total Madness – The Very Best of Madness (1997)

The Business – the Definitive Singles Collection is a 3 disc box set by the ska/pop band Madness released in 1993. It contained all the band's singles until that point with their respective b-sides and other bonus tracks, some rare. It also includes a 52-page booklet and snippets of interviews with people associated with Madness between some tracks. The interviews date from around the time of the Keep Moving album and were conducted by John Tobler. Among those interviewed were founder member John Hasler, former manager John "Kelloggs" Kalinowski and Dave Robinson of Stiff Records.

== Critical reception ==
Professional ratings
Review scores
Source	Rating
AllMusic	4/5 stars
The Encyclopedia of Popular Music	4/5 stars
Music Week	3/5 stars
NME	6/10
Select	3/5 medals

Upon its release, Paul Moody of NME felt that The Business did not "add anything to Madness' considerable charms" and was more suited to collectors. He commented that the compilation was "probably most notable for bearing assorted characters from their past wedged between the tracks in the quest for added curiosity value" and summarised, "The truly great songs are still some of the best moments the '80s offered us, but tangled up amongst B-sides and a stream of jingles they lose the focus that was always Madness' greatest asset. Collectors, you are allowed to love it. For anyone else, get a copy of the singles collection."

Mojo critic Mark Cooper felt that Madness "sounded like the last gasp of a neighbourly working-class culture that was dying on its feet." Similarly to Moody, Cooper described The Business as a release "for collectors", highlighting several B-sides but believing the group's A-sides were their best material. He felt the biggest drawback is "the fragments of old interviews from Madness sidekicks and business associates that are thrown between tracks like a bad radio programme. The material clearly dates back to the early '80s because the idea is virtually abandoned on the third CD, but the chatter is edited on to the end of songs in a manner which makes it distinctly hard to avoid."

Andrew Harrison of Select felt that the quality of songs wildly varied, praising the band's A-sides and believing that, otherwise, the best material comes from the "music hall-style picaresques" of the early work circa One Step Beyond (1979), and the "subtly moving" material from their "CND-and-Guardian'ed up" final record Mad Not Mad (1985). Harrison added that fans would be "driven to distracted by the box's largely meaningless interview snippets, which often run over intros and fades, pretty much defeating the object of the exercise." Music Week called it a "thoroughly researched and loving compiled audio history" of Madness, praising its comprehensive track listing and the inclusion of rarities and deeming it a perfect Christmas gift for fans, though they found the "taped interviews with friends, relations and business partners, though not the band itself," to be somewhat off-putting.

Retrospectively, Dave Thompson of AllMusic felt that, in compiling every A-side or B-side released by Madness alongside "a clutch of radio jingles and flexi-disc-only cuts", The Business is "both the definitive portrait of Britain's most consistent hitmakers of their generation, and the ultimate Madness rarities collection. That much of the collection had never previously appeared on CD (or even LP) goes without saying". Thompson added that Madness still delivered quality material even at their silliest, with "scarcely one duff moment" anywhere on the compilation, and felt that the spoken interludes from an eclectic array of friends and associates "add immeasurably to the documentary feel of the collection."

== Track listing ==
=== Disc one ===
(A mistake on the CD / Inlay card means that the song on the CD does not match the number on the inlay card.)

1. "Introduction" (unlisted)
2. "The Prince" (2 Tone single version - alternative mix) (Thompson)
3. "Madness" (album version) (Campbell)
4. "One Step Beyond" (album version) (Campbell)
5. "Mistakes" (Barson, Hasler)
6. "Nutty Theme" (McPherson, Thompson)
7. "My Girl" (Barson)
8. "Stepping into Line" (McPherson, Bedford)
9. "In the Rain" (single version) (McPherson, Madness)
10. "Night Boat to Cairo" (Barson, McPherson)
11. "Deceives the Eye" (Bedford, Foreman)
12. "Young and the Old" (McPherson, Barson)
13. "Don't Quote Me on That" (Smyth, Peter Tosh)
14. "Baggy Trousers" (McPherson, Foreman)
15. "The Business" (Barson)
16. "Embarrassment" (single version) (Thompson, Barson)
17. "Crying Shame" (Barson)
18. "The Return of the Los Palmas 7" (single version) (Barson, Woodgate, Bedford)
19. "That's The Way To Do It" (AKA "The Odd Job Man") (Foreman)
20. "My Girl" (Pathway demo) (Barson)
21. "Swan Lake" (live) (Arranged by Barson)
22. "Grey Day" (Barson)
23. "Memories" (Foreman)
24. "Shut Up" (album version) (McPherson, Foreman)
25. "A Town With No Name" (Foreman)

=== Disc two ===
1. "Never Ask Twice" (AKA "Airplane") (McPherson, Barson)
2. "It Must Be Love" (Original Single Version) (Labi Siffre)
3. "Shadow on the House" (Foreman)
4. "Cardiac Arrest" (album version) (Smash, Foreman)
5. "In the City" (McPherson, Smash, Barson, Foreman, Crutchfield, Inoue)
6. "House of Fun" (Barson, Thompson)
7. "Don't Look Back" (Foreman)
8. "Driving in My Car" (Barson)
9. "Terry Wogan Jingle" (Madness)
10. "Animal Farm" (Madness)
11. "Riding on My Bike" (Barson, Thompson)
12. "Our House" (Stretch Mix) (Smyth, Foreman)
13. "Walking With Mr. Wheeze" (Barson)
14. "Tomorrow's (Just Another Day)" (single version) (Smyth, Foreman)
15. "Madness (Is All in the Mind)" (single version) (Foreman)
16. "Wings of a Dove" (McPherson, Smyth)
17. "Behind the Eight Ball" (Madness)
18. "One's Second Thoughtlessness" (Thompson, Woodgate)
19. "The Sun and the Rain" (Barson)
20. "Fireball XL5" (Thompson)
21. "Visit to Dracstein Castle" (edited version) (Madness)
22. "Michael Caine" (Woodgate, Smyth)

=== Disc three ===
1. "If You Think There's Something" (Barson)
2. "One Better Day" (McPherson, Bedford)
3. "Guns" (McPherson)
4. "Victoria Gardens" (remix) (Barson, Smyth)
5. "Sarah" (Thompson)
6. "Yesterday's Men" (harmonica version) (McPherson, Foreman)
7. "All I Knew" (McPherson)
8. "It Must Be Love" (live) (Labi Siffre)
9. "Uncle Sam" (Thompson, Foreman)
10. "David Hamilton Jingle" (Madness)
11. "Inanity over Christmas" (Thompson, Woodgate)
12. "Please Don't Go" (Foreman)
13. "Sweetest Girl" (album version) (Green)
14. "Jennie (A Portrait Of)" (Thompson, Woodgate)
15. "Tears You Can't Hide" (Smyth)
16. "Call Me" (Smyth, McPherson)
17. "(Waiting For) The Ghost Train" (McPherson)
18. "One Step Beyond" (Italian version) (Campbell)
19. "Maybe in Another Life" (Thompson, Neal, Woodgate, Bedford)
20. "Seven Year Scratch" (edited version) (Madness, Campbell)
21. "Release Me" (Miller, Williams, Young, Harris)
22. "Carols on 45" (edited version) (Traditional; arranged by Madness)
23. "National Anthem" (Arranged by Madness)
