= House of Fun =

1982 single by Madness

Single by Madness

from the album Complete Madness
- Released: 14 May 1982
- Recorded: 1982
- Genre: Pop, ska, 2 tone, new wave
- Length: 2:48
- Label: Stiff
- Songwriters: Lee Thompson (lyrics); Mike Barson (music)
- Producers: Clive Langer, Alan Winstanley

Madness singles chronology
| "Cardiac Arrest" (1982) | "House of Fun" (1982) | "Driving in My Car" (1982) |

Music video
- "House of Fun" on YouTube

"House of Fun" is a song by English ska/pop group Madness, credited to Mike Barson and Lee Thompson. It was released as a one-off single on 14 May 1982 and reached number one in the UK Singles Chart, spending nine weeks in the charts. The song was re-released in 1992, reaching number 40. It is the band's only number one single in the UK and in 2015 the British public voted it as the nation's 8th favourite 1980s number one in a poll for ITV.

== Recording ==
The song was originally recorded under the title "Chemist Facade", without the "Welcome to the House of Fun" chorus. While the song was being recorded, head of Stiff Records Dave Robinson insisted that the song should have a chorus, so band member Mike Barson immediately wrote the "Welcome to the House of Fun" refrain on his piano.

At this point, the song had already been recorded, and the management decided not to re-record the whole song. Instead, the recording was edited, and the chorus instruments and vocals dubbed onto the recording. This proved to be difficult, mainly due to technical limitations at the time, and it resulted in the first part of the word "Welcome" being cut off. Due to this, the chorus seemed to begin "Elcome to the House of Fun", so lead singer Suggs was forced to overdub the word "Welcome". Although this proved to be a tough task, it was completed successfully.

== Music and lyrical content ==
"House of Fun" is composed in the key of D, written in common time. It is a pop song which moves at an upbeat 126 beats per minute. The song is written in simple verse-chorus form, ending with a repeating chorus fade out (the original 7" release version/mix ends with a sudden keyboard "crash", followed by fairground organ music). The song begins solely with eight drum beats, before the keyboard, bass guitar, electric guitar, trumpet and saxophone are all introduced simultaneously.

The song is about coming of age. The lyrics tell the story of a boy on his 16th birthday attempting to buy condoms at a chemist. The UK age of consent is 16, and he makes a point of stating that he is "16 today and up for fun". However, the boy is misunderstood by the chemist, as he asks for the condoms using slang euphemisms, such as "box of balloons with a featherlight touch" and "party hats with the coloured tips". The confused chemist behind the counter eventually informs the boy that the establishment is not a joke shop, and directs him towards the "House of Fun".

Madness guitarist Chris Foreman commented jokingly about the song:

I'm not sure about this one... I think it's about coming of age, I can't remember much about because when it happened to me it was a long time ago. You could buy a packet of fags, a pint of beer and a three-piece suit for half a crown and still have enough left to go and see Rudolf Valentino at the Gaumont! I can't afford to go to the pictures these days but I hear they talk in them now.

== Release ==
"House of Fun" was released by Stiff Records in May 1982 with "Don't Look Back" as its B-side. 70,000 copies of the single were issued in picture discs, making it the first Madness single to be released in this format.

When the song was reissued in 1992, the single included the track "Un Paso Adelante!", a Spanish version of the group's 1979 hit "One Step Beyond".

== Music video ==
A substantial portion of the music video was filmed at the Pleasure Beach in Great Yarmouth, with parts of the video featuring the band on the Roller Coaster. This was filmed on 7 March 1982. The video begins with Suggs dressed as a boy entering the chemist's shop with Lee Thompson and Chas Smash behind him, playing the saxophone and trumpet respectively. On entering the shop, Suggs acts out the lyrics of the song, as a 16-year-old boy awkwardly attempting to purchase condoms, without much success. Suddenly, on the first chorus, three of the band members enter the shop, dressed in gowns and wearing sunglasses and silly headgear (much like Monty Python-esque Pepperpots), and perform a simple, rhythmic yet comedic tongue-in-cheek stepping-dance routine, supposedly acting as dancing pepperpots hired with the Pleasure Beach attraction "Fun House".

The band are later seen in a barber's shop, before the finale of the song is sung on the roller coaster at the aforementioned funfair. The film closes with the band on board an infinite roller coaster loop as the chorus fades.

Despite the fact that "House of Fun" was not released in the US, the music video was shown on the newly launched MTV. Due to this, the music video, along with others such as "It Must Be Love" and "Cardiac Arrest", helped set the stage in the US for Madness' future song "Our House", which was their biggest stateside hit by far, peaking at number 7 in July 1983.

== Critical reception ==
In a review of the 1992 single reissue, Simon Williams of NME commented that "House of Fun" "still sounds as terrifyingly plinky plonky as Liberace and his grand piano falling down a million flight of stairs as it did [in 1982]".

== Compilation appearances ==
As well as the song's single release, it has featured on various compilation albums released by Madness. It was initially included on Complete Madness which was released on 23 April 1982, prior to the release of the single itself. This album also hit number 1 in the UK at the time of the single's release, meaning Madness were at the top of both the single and album charts. The song was then included on the 1992 compilation Divine Madness, which was later reissued as The Heavy Heavy Hits. The song was further included on The Business and It's... Madness. It featured in the Our House musical, which was based on the band's songs, and as such appears on the accompanying soundtrack, Our House. Furthermore, it was part of the US releases Madness and Ultimate Collection. In addition to these releases, the song also features on several "Best of the 80s" albums.

The original single contained a 10-second coda featuring music from a fairground. However, the version on the Complete Madness compilation as well as subsequent releases of the song removed this ending with the track fading to a conclusion instead. It wasn't until 2010 that the original 7" version was reissued; it was included on the second disc of the re-release of the band's 1982 album The Rise & Fall. This is also the version used on the A Guided Tour of Madness compilation.

== Personnel ==
- Lead vocals: Suggs
- Lead guitar: Chris Foreman
- Bass guitar: Mark Bedford
- Keyboards: Mike Barson
- Saxophone: Lee Thompson
- Trumpet: Chas Smash
- Drums: Daniel Woodgate
- Producers: Clive Langer and Alan Winstanley

== Formats and track listings ==
These are the formats and track listings of major single releases of "House of Fun".

=== 1982 release ===
- 7" single
  1. "House of Fun" (Barson/Thompson) – 2:58.
  2. "Don't Look Back" (Foreman) – 3:31

=== 1992 release ===
- 7" single
  1. "House of Fun" (Barson/Thompson) – 2:49
  2. "Un Paso Adelante!" (Campbell) – 2:36
- 12" single
  1. "House of Fun" (Barson/Thompson) – 2:49
  2. "Un Paso Adelante!" (Campbell) – 2:36
  3. "Yesterday's Men" (McPherson/Foreman) – 4:10
  4. "Gabriel's Horn (demo)" (Smyth) – 3:45
- CD single
  1. "House of Fun" (Barson/Thompson) – 2:49
  2. "Un Paso Adelante!" (Campbell) – 2:36
  3. "Yesterday's Men" (McPherson/Foreman) – 4:10
  4. "Gabriel's Horn (demo)" (Smyth) – 3:45
- Cassette single
  1. "House of Fun" (Barson/Thompson) – 2:49
  2. "Un Paso Adelante!" (Campbell) – 2:36

== Charts ==
=== Weekly charts ===
| Chart (1982) | Peak position |
|---|---|
| Australia (Kent Music Report) | 5 |
| Ireland (IRMA) | 1 |
| Netherlands (Single Top 100) | 34 |
| New Zealand (Recorded Music NZ) | 23 |
| UK Singles (Official Charts) | 1 |

| Chart (1992) | Peak position |
|---|---|
| Australia (ARIA) | 73 |
| UK Singles (OCC) | 40 |
| UK Airplay (Music Week) | 40 |

=== Year-end charts ===
| Chart (1982) | Rank |
|---|---|
| Australia (Kent Music Report) | 68 |

== Certifications and sales ==
| Region | Certification | Certified units/sales |
|---|---|---|
| United Kingdom (BPI) | Silver | 250,000^{^} |
^{^} Shipments figures based on certification alone.

== See also ==
- The Young Ones
