= Grey Day =

1981 single by Madness

Single by Madness

from the album 7
- B-side: "Memories"
- Released: 17 April 1981
- Recorded: 1981
- Genre: Reggae; 2-tone
- Length: 3:40
- Label: Stiff
- Songwriter: Mike Barson
- Producers: Clive Langer; Alan Winstanley

Madness singles chronology
"The Return of the Los Palmas 7" (1981)	"Grey Day" (1981)	"Shut Up" (1981)

"Grey Day" is a 2-Tone song written by Mike Barson and recorded by British pop/ska band Madness. The song was the first single released from the band's third studio album 7. It was a big departure from their early ska sound with a much darker, miserable feel. The song title does not appear in the lyrics as a single phrase, though a couplet rhyming "grey" with "day" features in the chorus.

The song was released as a single on 17 April 1981. The song spent 10 weeks in the UK Singles Chart, reaching a high of number 4. It was able to crack the charts in Australia as well, but only as high as number 82.

== Background ==
The song was written prior to the band becoming a success in the UK music scene, and the first performance of the song came back in 1978 at the Acklam Hall while the band were known as "The North London Invaders". However, the song was dropped soon afterwards. Eventually, during recording sessions before 7, the band rediscovered the song and recorded it with a different arrangement.

Barson has spoken about how he wrote the lyrics in the album's liner notes:

"When I wrote lyrics in those days, I'd just sit down and write and not really know what I was writing about, and the words just come. People have said the song is about nuclear holocaust, and I'm like, "Yeah, that sounds good!" I wish it had been about that. What is it actually about? Like I said I don't know! I was just trying to write something that was like the film Eraserhead. I loved that film, it's weird atmosphere. I was just trying to capture that nightmarish feeling."

== Music video ==
The music video for the single was filmed in March 1981. The majority of the video was shot on an open top bus as it drove around London, and in Bowmans shop window on Camden High Street, where the band performed the song. The street they are featured walking down is Royal College Street just off Camden High Street; they're seen entering houses between 109 and 121. A recurring theme in the music video is common dreams such as dreaming; that one is flying or falling.

== Appearances ==
"Grey Day" is one of Madness' most anthologised singles. In addition to its single release and appearance on the album 7, "Grey Day" also appears on the Madness collections Divine Madness (a.k.a. The Heavy Heavy Hits), Complete Madness, It's... Madness, The Business and Our House. It also features on all four US Madness retrospectives, Madness, Total Madness, Ultimate Collection and The Millennium Collection.

== Formats and track listings ==
These are the formats and track listings of major single releases of "Grey Day".

- 7" single / Cassette single
1. "Grey Day" (Barson) - 3:37
2. "Memories" (Foreman) - 2:24
- 12" single
1. "Un Paso Adelante!" (Campbell) - 2:18
2. "Baggy Trousers" (McPherson/Foreman) - 2:46
3. "Grey Day" (Barson) - 3:37
4. "Take It or Leave It" (Thompson/Barson) - 3:27

== Charts ==
Chart (1981)	Peak position
Australia (Kent Music Report)	82
Belgium (Ultratop 50 Flanders)	28
Ireland (IRMA)	4
Netherlands (Dutch Top 40)	25
Netherlands (Single Top 100)	18
UK Singles (OCC)	4

== Certifications and sales ==
Region	Certification	Certified units/sales
United Kingdom (BPI)	Silver	250,000^{^}
^{^} Shipments figures based on certification alone.
