= It's... Madness =

Compilation album by Madness
- Released: September 1990
- Recorded: 1979–1983
- Genre: Ska; pop
- Label: Virgin

Madness chronology
The Madness (1988)	It's... Madness (1990)	It's... Madness Too (1991)

Professional ratings
Review scores
Source	Rating
Allmusic	link

It's... Madness is a compilation album by the English pop band Madness released in 1990. It combines some of the band's hit singles and b-sides. A sequel to this, It's... Madness Too, was released the next year.

== Track listing ==
1. "House of Fun"
2. "Don't Look Back"
3. "Wings of a Dove"
4. "The Young and the Old"
5. "My Girl"
6. "Stepping into Line"
7. "Baggy Trousers"
8. "The Business"
9. "Embarrassment"
10. "One's Second Thoughtlessness"
11. "Grey Day"
12. "Memories"
13. "It Must Be Love"
14. "Deceives the Eye"
15. "Driving in My Car"
16. "Animal Farm"

== Certifications and sales ==
Region	Certification	Certified units/sales
United Kingdom (BPI)	Gold	100,000^{*}
^{*} Sales figures based on certification alone.

== Reissue ==
In 2006, EMI Records reissued the album, retitled Collection with new cover artwork by photographer Martin Parr.
