= It's... Madness Too =

Compilation album by Madness
- Released: October 1991
- Recorded: 1979–1984
- Genre: Ska; pop
- Label: Virgin

Madness chronology
It's... Madness (1990)	It's... Madness Too (1991)	Divine Madness (1992)

Re-release cover

Professional ratings
Review scores
Source	Rating
AllMusic	link

It's... Madness Too is a compilation album by the English ska and pop band Madness, released in 1991. It combines some of the band's hit singles and b-sides and is a sequel to It's... Madness, released the previous year.

== Track listing ==
1. "The Prince"
2. "Madness"
3. "One Step Beyond"
4. "Mistakes"
5. "The Return of the Los Palmas 7"
6. "Night Boat to Cairo"
7. "Shut Up"
8. "A Town With No Name"
9. "Cardiac Arrest"
10. "In the City"
11. "Our House"
12. "Walking with Mr. Wheeze"
13. "Tomorrow's (Just Another Day)"
14. "Victoria Gardens"
15. "The Sun and the Rain"
16. "Michael Caine"

== Certifications and sales ==
Region	Certification	Certified units/sales
United Kingdom (BPI)	Gold	100,000^{‡}
^{‡} Sales+streaming figures based on certification alone.
