= Absolutely (Madness album) =

Studio album by Madness
- Released: 26 September 1980
- Recorded: 1980
- Studio: Eden (London)
- Genres: Ska; pop; 2 Tone
- Length: 39:15
- Label: Stiff
- Producers: Clive Langer; Alan Winstanley

Madness chronology
One Step Beyond... (1979)	Absolutely (1980)	7 (1981)

Singles from Absolutely
- 1. "Baggy Trousers" Released: 5 September 1980; 2. "Embarrassment" Released: 14 November 1980; 3. "The Return of the Los Palmas 7" Released: 16 January 1981

Absolutely is the second studio album from the English ska band Madness, released by Stiff Records on 26 September 1980. The album reached number 2 in the UK album charts.

Absolutely spawned some of the band's biggest hits, most notably "Baggy Trousers", which peaked at number 3 in the UK and spent more than four months in the singles chart. "Embarrassment" reached number 4, and the instrumental "The Return of the Los Palmas 7" climbed to number 7. Although the album reviews were generally less enthusiastic than those of One Step Beyond..., they were mostly positive.

In 2009 and 2010, Madness re-released their back-catalogue of studio albums up to and including 1999's Wonderful with a bonus CD and extra tracks. The re-release of Absolutely has seven bonus tracks plus an additional CD featuring a 1980 concert recorded at the Hammersmith Odeon.

In a 2020 interview with GQ magazine Lee Thompson said it was his favourite Madness album.

== Album title ==
The album is named after one of the oft-said expressions of the band's then tour manager and sound man Tony Duffield.

== Cover ==
Inner sleeve illustration

The front cover sees the band standing in front of Chalk Farm tube station in Camden. When the original vinyl was released the first, more sombre, cover photograph was changed to a more animated pose after around 10,000 albums were pressed. The two sleeves can be distinguished by keyboardist Mike Barson's holding of the umbrella: in the earlier pressing he holds it up to his chin while in the later, and subsequently used, releases the umbrella is on the ground.

The inner sleeve features a London Underground-style roundel for a railway station called "Cairo East" on one side (this roundel later reappeared in the video for "(Waiting For) The Ghost Train") and a history of the group on the other. The "Cairo East" roundel is illustrated by painter, and former bass player with Kilburn and the High Roads, Humphrey Ocean.

== Critical reception ==
Professional ratings
Review scores
Source	Rating
AllMusic	3.5/5 stars
Christgau's Record Guide	B−
Classic Pop	4/5 stars
Mojo	4/5 stars
Q	4/5 stars
Record Mirror	4/5 stars
Rolling Stone	1/5 stars
Smash Hits	6 1/2/10
Sounds	5/5 stars
Uncut	3/5 stars

The album received mixed reviews at the time of release. Billboard recommended Absolutely to consumers, noting that it was "less gimmicky and more R&B/funk oriented" than Madness' debut album One Step Beyond..., while still retaining enough of the band's "'nutty' sound" to appeal to fans of the debut. Greil Marcus, however, likened Madness to "the Blues Brothers with English accents" in a scathing review for Rolling Stone that also took aim at fellow ska revivalists the Specials.

In a retrospective review, AllMusic's Stephen Thomas Erlewine wrote, "Absolutely does motor ahead on breakneck ska rhythms, but it never quite feels as raw as its predecessor, and that hint of gloss serves the three big hit singles very well." Erlewine felt that Absolutely usually delivers more of the same as the debut in "a highly appealing fashion."

== Track listing ==
No.	Title	Writer(s)	Length
1.	"Baggy Trousers"	Graham McPherson; Chris Foreman	2:45
2.	"Embarrassment"	Lee Thompson; Michael Barson	3:13
3.	"E.R.N.I.E."	McPherson; Foreman	2:08
4.	"Close Escape"	Thompson; Foreman	3:29
5.	"Not Home Today"	McPherson; Mark Bedford	2:30
6.	"On the Beat Pete"	Thompson; Madness	3:05
7.	"Solid Gone"	Chas Smash	2:22

Side two
No.	Title	Writer(s)	Length
8.	"Take It or Leave It"	Thompson; Barson	3:26
9.	"Shadow of Fear"	McPherson; Barson	1:58
10.	"Disappear"	McPherson; Bedford	2:58
11.	"Overdone"	Thompson; Foreman	3:45
12.	"In the Rain"	Barson, Bedford, Foreman, McPherson, Smyth, Thompson and Woodgate	2:42
13.	"You Said"	McPherson; Barson	2:35
14.	"The Return of the Los Palmas 7"	Barson; Daniel Woodgate; Bedford	2:01
Total length:			39:15

=== 2010 reissue ===
In 2009 and 2010, Madness re-released their entire back catalogue of studio albums until 1999's Wonderful with a bonus CD and extra tracks.

Disc 1

- The first disc contains the fourteen tracks from the original album plus seven bonus tracks and three promo videos.

The bonus tracks
No.	Title	Writer(s)	Length
15.	"In the Rain" (single version; B-side of "My Girl" 12")	McPherson; Madness	2:48
16.	"The Business" (B-side of "Baggy Trousers" 7")	Barson	3:27
17.	"Crying Shame" (B-side of "Embarrassment" 7")	Barson	2:40
18.	"That's the Way to Do It" (B-side of "The Return of the Los Palmas 7" 7")	Foreman	2:53
19.	"El Regresso de Los Palmas 7" (Spanish version))	Barson; Woodgate; Bedford	2:48
20.	"Swan Lake" (live; B-side of "The Return of the Los Palmas 7" 12"; originally from the film Dance Craze)	Pyotr Ilyich Tchaikovsky; arranged by Barson	2:37
21.	"Release Me / Close Escape / Solid Gone" (Patches magazine flexi disc)	Eddie Miller; Robert Yount; Dub Williams / Foreman; Thompson / Smash	5:06
Total length:			61:41

The promo videos

No.	Title	Length
1.	"Baggy Trousers"
2.	"Embarrassment"
3.	"The Return of the Los Palmas 7"

Disc two
BBC live in concert – Hammersmith Odeon, 23.12.80

No.	Title	Writer(s)	Length
1.	"One Step Beyond..." (live)	Cecil Campbell	2:51
2.	"E.R.N.I.E." (live)	McPherson; Foreman	2:08
3.	"Mistakes" (live)	Barson; John Hasler	2:35
4.	"Disappear" (live)	McPherson; Bedford	2:15
5.	"Bed and Breakfast Man" (live)	Barson	2:29
6.	"The Return of the Los Palmas 7" (live)	Barson; Woodgate; Bedford	2:20
7.	"Close Escape" (live)	Thompson; Foreman	2:44
8.	"Overdone" (live)	Thompson; Foreman	3:11
9.	"Not Home Today" (live)	McPherson; Bedford	2:15
10.	"Razor Blade Alley" (live)	Thompson	3:16
11.	"My Girl" (live)	Barson	2:45
12.	"Take It or Leave It" (live)	Thompson; Barson	2:39
13.	"On the Beat Pete" (live)	Thompson; Madness	2:54
14.	"Embarrassment" (live)	Thompson; Barson	3:10
15.	"Shadow of Fear" (live)	McPherson; Barson	1:54
16.	"You Said" (live)	McPherson; Barson	2:29
17.	"In the Middle of the Night" (live)	McPherson; Foreman	2:28
18.	"The Prince" (live)	Thompson	3:06
19.	"Baggy Trousers" (live)	McPherson; Foreman	2:25
20.	"Rockin' in A♭" (live)	Willy "Wurlitzer" Smith	2:01
21.	"Madness" (live)	Campbell	3:33
Total length:			55:28

== Personnel ==
Madness

- Graham "Suggs" McPherson – lead vocals, percussion
- Mike Barson – piano, organ, vibraphone, marimba, harmonica
- Chris Foreman – guitar, sitar, slide guitar
- Lee Thompson – tenor and baritone saxophones
- Daniel Woodgate – drums, fire extinguisher
- Mark Bedford – bass guitar
- Chas Smash – backing vocals, trumpet, lead vocals on "Solid Gone"

Technical

- Clive Langer – producer
- Alan Winstanley – producer
- Humphrey Ocean – inner sleeve illustration

2010 reissue

- Jeff Griffin – producer on disc two
- Tim Turan – remastering
- Martin "Cally" Callomon – art direction, design
- Paul Lester – liner notes

== Chart performance ==
Chart (1980)	Peak position	Total weeks
Dutch Albums Chart	2	43
Finnish Albums Chart	24	3
German Albums Chart	21	9
New Zealand Albums Chart	31	4
Norwegian Albums Chart	26	4
Swedish Albums Chart	15	3
UK Albums Chart	2	47
US Billboard Hot 200	146	4

== Certifications and sales ==
Region	Certification	Certified units/sales
United Kingdom (BPI)	Platinum	300,000^{^}
^{^} Shipments figures based on certification alone.
