= Cardiac Arrest (Madness song) =

1982 single by Madness

Single by Madness

from the album 7
- B-side: "In the City"
- Released: 12 February 1982
- Recorded: 1981
- Genre: Pop; 2-tone
- Length: 2:58
- Label: Stiff
- Composer: Chris Foreman
- Lyricist: Carl Smyth
- Producers: Clive Langer; Alan Winstanley

Madness singles chronology
"It Must Be Love" (1981)	"Cardiac Arrest" (1982)	"House of Fun" (1982)

Music video
- "Cardiac Arrest" on YouTube

"Cardiac Arrest" is a song by the English ska band Madness from their third studio album 7 (1981) and other compilation album called Complete Madness (1982). It spent 10 weeks in the UK singles chart peaking at No. 14. The song also spent 6 weeks in the Irish Singles Charts, peaking at No. 4.

In the Netherlands the single was released as a double A-side, and peaked at No. 15 in the Dutch Top 40. In the US, "Cardiac Arrest" was released on the compilation album Madness (1983) and the B-side of their "Our House" single.

== Content ==
The song was written by Chas Smash and Chris Foreman and tells a story of a workaholic who suffers a fatal heart attack on his way to work. It was originally set to be called "7 Letters" but was renamed to "Cardiac Arrest".

We got a lot of trouble over it. People writing to me saying, ‘How dare you write a song like that? My father had a heart attack, you don’t know what it feels like’ etc. But I did know what it felt like – my own father had a heart attack; that’s why I wrote it. It was born out of concern. The message was, ‘Relax darling, don’t get stressed.’ As the Arabs say, ‘Walk through life, don’t run.’

— Chas Smash, Seven Ragged Men

However, due to its obviously dark content due to the title, the song did not get as much airplay as previous singles. As such, it was the first Madness single since "The Prince" which did not reach the UK top 10.

The album version of the song ends after the second chorus with a dramatic cut to a coda representing the man's heart thudding and then stopping. The single version replaces this with a repeat of the more optimistic first chorus, which fades out.

=== In the City ===
The B-side, "In the City", was originally written by Bill Crutchfield, Chas Smash, Chris Foreman, Daisuke Inoue, Suggs, and Mike Barson for a Japanese television advertisement for Honda City cars. The various versions of the advert, including variations using "Driving in My Car" instead of "In the City", appear between tracks on the 1992 Divine Madness video.

== Music video ==
The music video for "Cardiac Arrest" featured Chas Smash as a person having a heart attack and the remaining band members playing roles of people advising him not to work so hard. The video follows the single version of the song rather than the album version.

== Track listing ==
7" single

1. "Cardiac Arrest" – 2:58
2. "In the City" – 2:56

12" single

1. "Cardiac Arrest" (Extended 12" Version) – 4:10
2. "In the City" – 2:56

== Charts ==
Chart (1982)	Peak position
UK Singles (Official Charts)	14
