= Shut Up (Madness song) =

1981 song by Madness

Single by Madness

from the album 7
- B-side: "A Town with No Name"; "Never Ask Twice"; "A Day on the Town"
- Released: 11 September 1981
- Recorded: 1981
- Genre: Pop; 2-tone; new wave
- Length: 2:48 (Complete Madness version); 3:23 (single version); 4:05 (album version)
- Label: Stiff
- Composer: Chris Foreman
- Lyricist: Graham McPherson
- Producers: Clive Langer; Alan Winstanley

Madness singles chronology
"Grey Day" (1981)	"Shut Up" (1981)	"It Must Be Love" (1981)

Music video
- "Shut Up" on YouTube

"Shut Up" is a pop song written by Suggs and Chris Foreman. It was recorded by the English ska and pop band Madness, and was featured on the band's third studio album 7. It was released as a single on 11 September 1981, spending 10 weeks in the UK singles chart. It reached a high position of number 7.

The song tells a story of a criminal who, despite obvious evidence, tries to convince people he is not guilty. Even though the song is called "Shut Up", the two words do not appear in the lyrics at all. However, they were the final words of an additional verse which was part of an early version of the song.

== Music video ==
The promotional video for the single released featured the band dressed as a group of criminals, then later as police officers, working for and later chasing, lead vocalist Suggs. Suggs is presented as a used car salesman/criminal (with mask, bowler hat and black suit/horizontally striped shirt). The video implies that Suggs' character has his friends steal cars for his business, though at the start of the video it is implied that he has been caught for his crimes by the police (with the song being him pleading his innocence).

In one sequence, the costumed band gather round as Chris Foreman (in police uniform) plays the song's guitar solo on the "Super Yob" guitar, previously owned by Dave Hill of the rock band Slade.

== Appearances ==
In addition to its single release and appearance on the album 7, "Shut Up" also appears on the Madness collections Complete Madness, It's... Madness Too, The Business, Divine Madness (a.k.a. The Heavy Heavy Hits) and Our House. It also features on two US Madness compilations, Madness and Total Madness.

== Formats and track listings ==
These are the formats and track listings of major single releases of "Shut Up".

- 7" Single
1. "Shut Up" (McPherson/Foreman) - 3:23
2. "A Town with No Name" (Foreman) - 2:52
- 12" Single
1. "Shut Up (full length version)" (McPherson/Foreman) - 4:05
2. "Never Ask Twice" (McPherson/Barson) - 3:03
3. "A Town with No Name" (Foreman) - 2:52
- Dutch 12" Single (STIFF BUY-IT 126, released with "12 INCH" a title)
1. "Shut Up" (McPherson/Foreman) - 3:55
2. "Day on the Town" (McPherson/Foreman) - 2:50
3. "Never Ask Twice" (McPherson/Barson) - 2:55
4. "A Town with No Name" (Foreman) - 2:45

== Charts ==
Chart (1981)	Peak position
UK Singles (Official Charts)	7

== Certifications and sales ==
Region	Certification	Certified units/sales
United Kingdom (BPI)	Silver	250,000^{^}
^{^} Shipments figures based on certification alone.
