= The Return of the Los Palmas 7 =

Single by Madness

Single by Madness

from the album Absolutely
- B-side: "That's the Way to Do It"; "Swan Lake"
- Released: 16 January 1981
- Recorded: 1980
- Genre: 2 Tone; ska; pop
- Length: 2:33 (single version); 2:03 (album version)
- Label: Stiff
- Songwriters: Mike Barson; Daniel Woodgate; Mark Bedford
- Producers: Clive Langer; Alan Winstanley

Madness singles chronology
"Embarrassment" (1980)	"The Return of the Los Palmas 7" (1981)	"Grey Day" (1981)

Music video
- "The Return of the Los Palmas 7" on YouTube

"The Return of the Los Palmas 7" is a song by the English ska and pop band Madness, written by Mike Barson, Mark Bedford and Daniel Woodgate. The song was Woodgate's first credit as a songwriter, and was released as the band's seventh single on 16 January 1981. The single reached number 7 in the UK and remained in the charts for 11 weeks. The single release is slightly different from the track on the album Absolutely, upon which it is listed as "Return of the Los Palmas 7" and is approximately 30 seconds shorter.

The song is mainly instrumental, except for some ad-libbing by Chas Smash at the beginning, the sound of "Waiter!" approximately 42 seconds into the track and "Good night!" at the very end. Dave Robinson, head of Stiff Records, was keen on Madness recording another instrumental track, especially after the success of "One Step Beyond...". The resulting song was not as ska-influenced as were their earlier songs, but was played heavily on BBC Radio 2. This helped Madness gain a new generation of older fans.

== Music video ==
The single's music video was filmed in January 1981 at the Venus Cafe, 95 Golborne Road, London W10 5NL, and at Kenwood Park, North London.

The video mainly features the band in the cafe, switching between a greasy-spoon scene and an elegant restaurant scene. In the middle of the video, the band are shown dressed as cowboys in Kenwood Park. These three scenarios are interspersed between random clips, which comprise the bulk of the video, as it was created just two weeks before the single's release. Some of these clips are also included in the video for the Bob Marley song "One Love", which includes guest appearances by Suggs and Chas Smash.

The song is incorrectly titled "Return to the Los Palmos 7" in the credit block, appearing both at the head and tail of the video.

The clips that are interspersed throughout the video are chronologically summarised below.

=== Clips used ===
Time	Video clip
00:29	Apollo rocket taking off.
00:32	Millennium Falcon from Star Wars.
00:34	Failed car stunt.
00:44	Liverpool F.C. football fans holding up scarves.
00:46	Björn Borg serving during a Wimbledon tennis match.
00:47	Paraglider towed by a boat on a river.
00:48	Man practising ski ballet.
00:49	A fence jumped at the Grand National.
01:01	Ten-shilling note shown, then removed to show a 50-pence piece.
01:03	The 1970 UK General Election swingometer had to be hurriedly extended during the broadcast following a larger than expected swing to the right.
01:04	TIE fighter from Star Wars.
01:05	Ballroom dancers.
01:06	Man holding a rabbit.
01:07	Eric Morecambe and Ernie Wise show their OBEs.
01:08	Harold Wilson waving outside 10 Downing Street.
01:09	A New Years Eve reveller jumping in the east fountain of Trafalgar Square with South Africa House in the background.
01:15	Poster of the movie Law and Order, with Ronald Reagan.
01:22	Scottish football fans.
01:23	Alan Taylor makes it 1-0 to West Ham United in the 1975 FA Cup final against Fulham F. C.
01:25	Cricketers playing.
01:26	Outtake from the "My Girl" video: Suggs watching the "One Step Beyond" video and grinning.
01:27	Large crowd.
01:28	British royal family appearing on Buckingham Palace balcony during 1977's Silver Jubilee .
01:28	Charlie Chaplin kissing wife Oona on the cheek after receiving his Knighthood on 4th March 1975.
01:29	Skateboarder performing.
01:51	Footballer Bobby Moore playing for Fulham FC.
01:52	Car rolling over.
01:52	Garry Sobers and Ray Illingworth chatting.
01:53	Concorde flying overhead.
01:53	Very brief image of Mick Jagger.
01:54	Margaret Thatcher waving outside 10 Downing Street.
01:54	Two Soyuz cosmonauts.
01:54	Bird's-eye view of Spaghetti Junction.
01:55	Arsenal F.C. player Frank McLintock collecting the FA Cup.
01:55	Brief clip of Bianca Jagger.
01:56	U.S. president Richard Nixon being sworn in.
01:56	Boeing 747 on runway.
01:57	Very brief shot of the legs of a woman sitting down.
01:57	John Lennon and Yoko Ono hold a press conference to announce their concept for Nutopia, 2nd April 1973.
01:58	LNER Class A3 4472 Flying Scotsman on a crane.
01:58	Georges Pompidou.
01:58	Ted Heath being applauded.
01:59	Liverpool F.C. fans.
01:59	Guy the Gorilla is introduced to Lomie, his prospective mate in London Zoo in 1971.
02:00	Crowd holding Union Flags.
02:00	Horse clearing a fence.
02:00	Brief shot from the "Embarrassment" video, also by Madness.
02:00	Very brief shot of a woman.
02:01	Mervyn Day taking a goal kick for West Ham United in the 1975 FA Cup Final against Fulham F.C.
02:02	Jeremy Thorpe with election rosette.
02:02	Henry A. Kissinger and Le Duc Tho at Paris Peace Accords.
02:03	Woman smashing champagne bottle against a ship.
02:03	Three soldiers walking.
02:03	U.S. president Jimmy Carter shaking hands with PM James Callaghan.
02:03	Peter Sellers approaching a microphone.
02:03	Jane Fonda in Vietnam.
02:04	Two female hockey players about to start a match between England & Scotland in 1976 at Wembley Stadium.
02:04	Han Solo from Star Wars firing a weapon.
02:05	Björn Borg displaying a Wimbledon trophy.
02:05	Haile Selassie I of Ethiopia.
02:06	Grand National trophy.
02:06	Dog competition.
02:07	Premium Bond machine "E.R.N.I.E" (the subject of the Madness song of the same name).
02:08	Tabloid headline saying "Wilson Resigns".
02:08	Harrier jet flying.
02:08	A football goal being scored.
02:09	Female spinning a baton.
02:10	A car driving into a tree.
02:10	Astronauts walking.
02:10	Man's hands holding a bent spoon.
02:11	Football fan holding a piece of Wembley Stadium turf.
02:11	Princess Anne and Mark Phillips getting married.
02:12	Chas Smash from the "My Girl" music video.

== Appearances ==
In addition to its single release and appearance on the album Absolutely, "The Return of the Los Palmas 7" also appears on the Madness collections Divine Madness (a.k.a. The Heavy Heavy Hits), Complete Madness, It's... Madness Too, The Business, Our House and Ultimate Collection.

== Formats and track listings ==
These are the formats and track listings of major single releases of "The Return of the Los Palmas 7".

=== 7" vinyl single ===
Side one
No.	Title	Writer(s)	Length
1.	"The Return of the Los Palmas 7"	Mike Barson, Daniel Woodgate, Mark Bedford	2:33

Side two
No.	Title	Writer(s)	Length
1.	"That's the Way to Do It"	Chris Foreman	2:51

=== 12" vinyl single ===
Included with the 12" single was a copy of the first edition of "The Nutty Boys" comic. The demo version of "My Girl" is notable for being the first officially released Madness track to feature a lead vocal by Mike Barson; it would take another 28 years before a second Barson vocal track was released on the "Sugar and Spice" download single.

Side one
No.	Title	Writer(s)	Length
1.	"The Return of the Los Palmas 7"	Barson, Woodgate, Bedford	2:33
2.	"My Girl" (Demo)	Barson	2:27

Side two
No.	Title	Writer(s)	Length
1.	"That's the Way to Do It"	Foreman	2:51
2.	"Swan Lake" (Live)	Tchaikovsky, arranged by Barson	2:34

== Charts ==
Chart (1981)	Peak position
UK Singles (Official Charts)	7

== Certifications and sales ==
Region	Certification	Certified units/sales
United Kingdom (BPI)	Silver	250,000^{^}
^{^} Shipments figures based on certification alone.
