= My Girl (Madness song) =

1979 single by Madness

- Artwork for original 1979 single

Single by Madness

from the album One Step Beyond...
- B-side: "Stepping into Line", "In the Rain"
- Released: 21 December 1979
- Recorded: 1979
- Genre: Ska; 2-tone
- Length: 2:44
- Label: Stiff
- Songwriter: Mike Barson
- Producers: Clive Langer; Alan Winstanley

Madness singles chronology
"One Step Beyond" (1979)	"My Girl" (1979)	"Night Boat to Cairo" (1980)

Music video
- "My Girl" on YouTube

"My Girl" is a song by British ska/pop group Madness from their debut album, One Step Beyond... (1979). It was written by Mike Barson. The song was released as a single on 21 December 1979 by Stiff Records and spent 10 weeks on the UK Singles Chart, peaking at number 3.

The song was reissued on 27 July 1992 following the success of the reissued "It Must Be Love". It reached number 27 in the UK Singles Chart.

== Song history ==
Mike Barson was working driving a van and delivering bananas teamed with a co-worker who was always talking about “My girl did this” and “My girl did that”. Barson used this phrasing to write a song about his own experiences with his girlfriend at the time, photographer Kerstin Rodgers. Barson originally performed lead vocals on the song and sang on the original demo.

The song first made its way into the band's set when they were performing as The Invaders. The first performance of the song came in July 1978, when the band performed at a shop in Camden Lock called Blind Alley where band member Mark Bedford was working; at the time the song was simply titled "New Song". Suggs took over the vocal duties from Barson before long, and sang the album version of the song.

When the group performed the song on Top of the Pops in January 1980, they were the first band of the new decade performing on the TV show. When the single was reissued in July 1992, the band, including Barson, performed the song again on Top of the Pops, being the first time the original band had performed on the show since November 1983 with "The Sun and the Rain".

For the reissue in July 1992, the new single cover featured updated headshots of each of the members, the idea of guitarist Chris Foreman. However, according to Foreman, Barson was still living in Holland at the time and refused to come to have his picture taken, or to have a photographer come to Holland to take it. So instead, a headshot of Barson from the early 80s was used instead.

== Music video ==
The music video for "My Girl" features Madness performing the song at the Dublin Castle, Camden. For the video, the stage was extended especially, in order to ensure that the band could perform comfortably.

== Critical reception ==
Mike Nicholls of Record Mirror noted the contrast between "My Girl" and the band's previous single, "One Step Beyond". He felt "My Girl" to be a "Cockney/Dury-style lament" and "more indicative of the Kilburn and the High Roads side of Madness' sound".

== Other versions ==
A demo version of "My Girl" was released on the B-side of the 12" version of "The Return of the Los Palmas 7", featuring Mike Barson on vocals. In 2006, The Ordinary Boys released a live recording of the song at the Brixton Academy featuring Suggs, as the B-side to their single "Nine-2-Five".

On 2 May 2008, Graham McPherson (Suggs) and Carl Smyth (Chas Smash) performed a new arrangement by Pet Shop Boys live at Heaven in London; they appeared as part of Pet Shop Boys' live set during Can You Bear It?, the benefit evening for Dainton Connell's family. A Pet Shop Boys version of the song appears on the Pet Shop Boys' Christmas EP, along with a remix of the song.

Barson wrote a follow-up song, "My Girl 2", which was recorded by Madness and released as a single in 2012. Though it contains the phrase "my girl", "My Girl 2" is otherwise musically and lyrically quite distinct from "My Girl".

== Appearances ==
In addition to its single release and appearance on the album One Step Beyond... "My Girl" also appears on the Madness collections Divine Madness (a.k.a. The Heavy Heavy Hits), Complete Madness, It's... Madness, Total Madness and The Business.

Audio Bullys included it on their 2003 instalment of the Back to Mine series of 'after hours grooving' DJ mix albums, with Tom Dinsdale referring to it as "Classic Madness", adding "everyone should be able to relate to this tune".

== Formats and track listings ==
These are the formats and track listings of major single releases of "My Girl".

=== 1979 release ===
7" vinyl single

Side one
No.	Title	Writer(s)	Length
1.	"My Girl"	Mike Barson	2:41

Side two
No.	Title	Writer(s)	Length
1.	"Stepping into Line"	John Hasler, Graham McPherson, Chris Foreman	2:16

12" vinyl single

Side one
No.	Title	Writer(s)	Length
1.	"My Girl"	Barson	2:41

Side two
No.	Title	Writer(s)	Length
1.	"Stepping into Line"	Hasler, McPherson, Foreman	2:16
2.	"In the Rain"	McPherson, Lee Jay Thompson	2:44

=== 1992 release ===
7" vinyl single

Side one
No.	Title	Writer(s)	Length
1.	"My Girl"	Mike Barson	2:41

Side two
No.	Title	Writer(s)	Length
1.	"Madness" (live)	Cecil Campbell	3:05

CD single, #1
No.	Title	Writer(s)	Length
1.	"My Girl"	Barson	2:41
2.	"E.R.N.I.E." (live)	McPherson, Foreman	2:17
3.	"Embarrassment" (live)	Thompson, Barson	3:15
4.	"Tomorrow's Dream" (live)	Thompson, Barson	4:05

CD single, #2
No.	Title	Writer(s)	Length
1.	"My Girl"	Barson	2:41
2.	"Precious One" (live)	Thompson, Smyth	3:40
3.	"My Girl" (live)	Barson	3:20
4.	"Disappear" (live)	McPherson, Bedford	2:33

== Charts ==
Chart (1980)	Peak position
Ireland (Irish Singles Chart)	3
UK Singles (OCC)	3

Chart (1992)	Peak position
UK Singles (OCC)	27
UK Airplay (Music Week)	24

== Certifications and sales ==
Region	Certification	Certified units/sales
United Kingdom (BPI)	Silver	250,000^{^}
^{^} Shipments figures based on certification alone.

== My Guy's Mad at Me ==
"My Guy's Mad at Me"

Single by Tracey Ullman

from the album You Caught Me Out
- A-side: "My Guy"
- B-side: "Thinking of Running Away"
- Released: March 1984
- Recorded: January 1984
- Genre: Pop
- Length: 2:54
- Label: Stiff
- Songwriter: Mike Barson
- Producer: Peter Collins

Tracey Ullman singles chronology
"Move Over Darling" (1983)	"My Guy's Mad at Me" (1984)	"Sunglasses" (1984)

Tracey Ullman covered Madness's "My Girl" in 1984. The lyric and title were changed to "My Guy's Mad at Me". Madness' Mark Bedford played bass on the track. Her version was in the UK Top 40 at the same time as Madness' "Michael Caine" and peaked at number 23. The music video featured the British politician Neil Kinnock, at the time the Leader of the Opposition. The single was also released as a 7" picture disc, with a picture of Ullman and Kinnock sitting at a table.

=== Formats and track listings ===
7" vinyl single

Side one
No.	Title	Writer(s)	Length
1.	"My Guy"	Mike Barson	2:54

Side two
No.	Title	Writer(s)	Length
1.	"Thinking of Running Away"	Phil Chapman, Peter Collins, Tracey Ullman	2:03

12" vinyl single

Side one
No.	Title	Writer(s)	Length
1.	"My Guy" (Extended version)	Barson

Side two
No.	Title	Writer(s)	Length
1.	"My Guy"	Barson	2:54
2.	"Thinking of Running Away"	Chapman, Collins, Ullman	2:03

=== Chart performance ===
Chart (1984)	Peak position
UK Singles Chart	23
Dutch GfK chart	19
Dutch Top 40	23
Irish Singles Chart	7
