= 7 (Madness album) =

Studio album by Madness
- Released: 2 October 1981
- Recorded: July–August 1981
- Studios: Compass Point Studios, Nassau, Bahamas ("Grey Day" recorded early 1981 in London)
- Genres: 2 Tone; ska; pop; reggae
- Length: 38:35
- Label: Stiff
- Producers: Clive Langer; Alan Winstanley

Madness chronology
Absolutely (1980)	7 (1981)	The Rise & Fall (1982)

Singles from 7
- 1. "Grey Day" Released: 17 April 1981; 2. "Shut Up" Released: 11 September 1981; 3. "Cardiac Arrest" Released: 12 February 1982

7 (also known as Madness 7) is the third studio album by the English ska and pop band Madness. Released in October 1981, it peaked at No. 5 on the UK Albums Chart. All but one track was recorded at Compass Point Studios in Nassau, Bahamas in the summer of 1981, the exception being "Grey Day" which was recorded in London earlier in the year, although in 2011 co-producer Alan Winstanley stated in the Guided Tour of Madness boxed-set that much of the album was re-recorded in London when they returned from Nassau. The album title was band member Chas Smash's idea based on the lucky number 7.

== Critical reception ==
Professional ratings
Review scores
Source	Rating
AllMusic	4/5 stars
Classic Pop	3.5/5 stars
Mojo	4/5 stars
Record Collector	4/5 stars
Record Mirror	5/5 stars
The Rolling Stone Album Guide	3/5 stars
Smash Hits	8/10
Sounds	5/5 stars
Uncut	4/5 stars

In a retrospective review for AllMusic, Stephen Thomas Erlewine described 7 as "a great leap forward" for Madness, noting that while "they're still clearly the same nutty band that tore it up with One Step Beyond", the album "finds the group expanding its horizons considerably, ratcheting up the melodious pop quotient in their songwriting, as well as the distinctly English character sketches."

== Track listing ==
Side one
No.	Title	Writer(s)	Length
1.	"Cardiac Arrest"	Chas Smash, Chris Foreman	2:52
2.	"Shut Up"	Graham McPherson, Foreman	4:07
3.	"Sign of the Times"	McPherson, Mike Barson	2:43
4.	"Missing You"	McPherson, Barson	2:32
5.	"Mrs. Hutchinson"	Barson	2:17
6.	"Tomorrow's Dream"	Lee Thompson, Barson	3:54

Side two
No.	Title	Writer(s)	Length
7.	"Grey Day"	Barson	3:40
8.	"Pac-a-Mac"	Thompson, Barson	2:37
9.	"Promises Promises"	Thompson, Barson	2:52
10.	"Benny Bullfrog"	Thompson, Foreman	1:51
11.	"When Dawn Arrives"	Thompson, Barson	2:43
12.	"The Opium Eaters"	Barson	3:03
13.	"Day on the Town"	McPherson, Foreman	3:24
Total length:			38:35

There were several different versions of the album released throughout the world. Some territories removed the not so tourist-friendly "Day on the Town" while others replaced it with "Never Ask Twice (a.k.a. Aeroplane/Airplane)", which was issued on the "Shut Up" 12" single in the UK. In Belgium "Never Ask Twice" was issued on a one-sided 7" single with initial copies of the album. France renamed "Day on the Town" as "A Place in the City". Australia added "It Must Be Love" and "Never Ask Twice", Spain replaced "Cardiac Arrest" with "It Must Be Love" and Japan added "In the City", which was issued there as a single after it was initially written for and used to promote Honda City cars in television commercials.

Initial vinyl pressings featured different mixes of some tracks (most notably "Mrs Hutchinson" and "Day on the Town"), which haven't been used since.

=== 2010 reissue ===
In 2009 and 2010, Madness re-released their entire back catalogue of studio albums up until 1999's Wonderful with a bonus CD and extra tracks. 7 was reissued by Union Square Music's collector's label Salvo on 12 April 2010.

CD 1
The original album
*The first disc contains the thirteen tracks from the original album plus four promo videos.
The promo videos

1. Grey Day
2. Shut Up
3. It Must be Love
4. Cardiac Arrest

CD 2

The Richard Skinner session
No.	Title	Writer(s)	Length
1.	"Missing You" (recorded 27 September 1981 for BBC Radio 1 at Maida Vale Studio 4, London)	McPherson, Barson	2:41
2.	"Sign of the Times" (recorded 27 September 1981 for BBC Radio 1 at Maida Vale Studio 4, London)	McPherson, Barson	2:37
3.	"Tiptoes" (recorded 27 September 1981 for BBC Radio 1 at Maida Vale Studio 4, London)	McPherson, Barson	2:40

The bonus tracks
No.	Title	Writer(s)	Length
4.	"Memories" (B-side of "Grey Day" single)	Foreman	2:24
5.	"A Town with No Name" (B-side of "Shut Up" single)	Foreman	2:51
6.	"Never Ask Twice" (B-side of "Shut Up" 12" single)	McPherson, Barson	3:00
7.	"It Must Be Love" (non-album single, 1981)	Labi Siffre	3:26
8.	"Shadow on the House" (B-side of "It Must Be Love" single)	Foreman	3:21
9.	"In the City" (B-side of "Cardiac Arrest" single)	McPherson, Barson, Smash, Foreman, Bill Crutchfield, Daisuke Inoue	3:00
10.	"Cardiac Arrest" (12" extended version)	Smash, Foreman	4:17
11.	"Grey Day" (live) (from NME Racket Packet cassette, 1983)	Barson	4:32
Total length:			34:56

== Personnel ==
Madness

- Graham "Suggs" McPherson – lead vocals
- Mike Barson – piano, organ, vibes, marimba, tubular bells
- Chris Foreman – guitar, sitar
- Mark Bedford – bass
- Lee Thompson – saxophones, burps, squeaks, lead vocals on track 10
- Daniel Woodgate – drums, congas
- Chas Smash – backing vocals, trumpet

Technical

- Clive Langer – producer, engineer
- Alan Winstanley – producer, engineer
- Arun Chakraverty – mastering
- Stella Artwork – cover
- C-More – cover
- Mike Putland – photography

2010 reissue

- Dale Griffin – producer on Richard Skinner session
- Mike Engels – engineer on Richard Skinner session
- Tim Turan – remastering
- Martin 'Cally' Callomon – art direction, design
- David Quantick – liner notes

== Chart performance ==
=== Album ===
Chart (1981)	Peak position	Total weeks
Dutch Albums Chart	5	17
Swedish Albums Chart	41	1
UK Albums Chart	5	28

=== Singles ===
Date	Single	Chart	Position
Apr 1981	Grey Day	UK	No. 4
Sep 1981	Shut Up (edited to 3:26 for issue as a single)	UK	No. 7
Feb 1982	Cardiac Arrest (remixed for issue as a single)	UK	No. 14

== Certifications and sales ==
Region	Certification	Certified units/sales
United Kingdom (BPI)	Gold	100,000^{^}
^{^} Shipments figures based on certification alone.
