= Baggy Trousers =

1980 single by Madness

Single by Madness

from the album Absolutely
- B-side: "The Business"
- Released: 5 September 1980
- Recorded: 1980
- Studio: Eden (London)
- Genre: Ska; 2 tone; pop
- Length: 2:46
- Label: Stiff
- Songwriters: Graham McPherson; Chris Foreman
- Producers: Clive Langer; Alan Winstanley

Madness singles chronology
| "Night Boat to Cairo" (1980) | "Baggy Trousers" (1980) | "Embarrassment" (1980) |

Music video
- "Baggy Trousers" by Madness on YouTube

"Baggy Trousers" is a song by the English ska and pop band Madness from their second studio album Absolutely (1980). It was written by lead vocalist Graham "Suggs" McPherson and guitarist Chris Foreman, and reminisces about school days. (Mike Barson also received a writing credit in error, the correct McPherson/Foreman credit being used for subsequent releases.) The band first began performing the song at live shows in April 1980.

It was released as a single on 5 September 1980 and spent 20 weeks in UK charts, reaching a high of #3. It was the 28th best-selling single of 1980 in the UK.

In October 2017, American punk rock and rap rock band the Transplants released a cover version of the song on their debut extended play Take Cover.

== Music and lyrics ==
Suggs later recalled in an interview that "I was very specifically trying to write a song in the style of Ian Dury, especially the songs he was writing then, which [were] often sort of catalogues of phrases in a constant stream." He contrasted "Baggy Trousers" with Pink Floyd's 1979 single "Another Brick in the Wall": "I was writing about my time at school. Pink Floyd had that big hit with 'teacher, leave those kids alone'. It didn't really relate to me, because I hadn't been to a public school where I was bossed about and told to sing "Rule Britannia!" and all that", having instead attended a comprehensive school with much less strictly enforced discipline.

Suggs wrote the lyrics while staying at saxophonist Lee Thompson's flat on the Caledonian Road, starting with a list of everything he could remember from his days at Quintin Kynaston and then paring it down into a song; by the time he brought the words to rehearsal, Foreman had already worked out the riff. Foreman said he originally wanted the song to sound like the Faces before the band gave it a ska arrangement. Suggs also suggested the four chords that lead into the song, which Foreman said carry a hint of Lord Rockingham's XI's "Hoots Mon"; for the school bell-type sound in the introduction, drummer Daniel Woodgate hit a fire extinguisher, and Barson played the harmonica part. Foreman later said he had not rated the song highly at the time, as it had no conventional chorus and he had made up the middle eight on the spot.

== Music video ==
The music video of the song was shot in Kentish Town in northwest London: at the Kentish Town C of E primary school on Islip Street and the Peckwater Estate. The band's saxophonist, Lee Thompson decided he wanted to fly through the air for his solo, with the use of wires hanging from a crane. This was inspired by seeing Peter Gabriel flying during a Genesis concert. Thompson recreated the moment live at the band's reunion concert in 1992, Madstock!, during the band's 2007 Christmas tour, and the 2009 Glastonbury Festival as well as in a 2011 TV advert for Kronenbourg 1664 in which the band plays a slow version of "Baggy Trousers". The slow version was later released that same year on the box set A Guided Tour of Madness under the title "Le Grand Pantalon".

Second vocalist Chas Smash is shown playing the harmonica in the video, but it was actually played by multi-instrumentalist Mike Barson.

The video received great positive response from the public, and was particularly important as it demonstrated the potential for television shows such as Top of the Pops to show a band's music videos instead of having them perform live. Following the release of "Baggy Trousers", the public began to anticipate future Madness music videos.

== Appearances ==
In addition to its single release and appearance on the album Absolutely, "Baggy Trousers" also appears on the Madness collections Divine Madness (a.k.a. The Heavy Heavy Hits), Complete Madness, It's... Madness, Total Madness, The Business and Our House: The Original Songs. Its only appearance on a US Madness compilation is on Ultimate Collection.

The song was featured in the sports comedy film Mean Machine (2001), and was included in the accompanying soundtrack.

In 2011, the song was slowed down to half its normal speed and was used for an advert for the Kronenbourg 1664 'Slow' campaign (see above).

In 1983, Colgate used the song's melody in a television advertisement written by Jay Pond-Jones and Ric Cooper in which a group of kids including actor Lee Ross sing newly written lyrics about Colgate Blue Minty Gel toothpaste, a variant of which was later used in the United States. The advert was seen as groundbreaking but had to be pre-approved by the band. Pond-Jones said, "Many years later ... I found out how they actually quite liked it. Even now, Carl from the band introduces me to people as “the bloke who did the Colgate ad”."

== Track listing ==
=== 7" ===
| No. | Title | Writer(s) | Length |
|---|---|---|---|
| 1. | "Baggy Trousers" | Graham McPherson; Chris Foreman | 2:46 |
| 2. | "The Business" | Mike Barson | 3:14 |

=== 12" (Record Store Day 2022) ===
| No. | Title | Writer(s) | Length |
|---|---|---|---|
| 1. | "Baggy Trousers" | McPherson; Foreman | 2:46 |
| 2. | "Le Grand Pantalon" | McPherson; Foreman | 4:33 |
| 3. | "Disappear" | McPherson; Mark Bedford | 2:58 |
| 4. | "The Business" | Barson | 3:14 |
| 5. | "That's The Way to Do It" | Foreman | 2:50 |
| 6. | "On the Beat Pete" | Lee Thompson; Madness | 3:05 |

== Charts ==
=== Weekly charts ===
| Chart (1980–1981) | Peak position |
|---|---|
| Australia (Kent Music Report) | 30 |
| Belgium (Ultratop 50 Flanders) | 23 |
| France (IFOP) | 30 |
| Ireland (IRMA) | 5 |
| Netherlands (Dutch Top 40) | 4 |
| Netherlands (Single Top 100) | 6 |
| New Zealand (Recorded Music NZ) | 3 |
| UK Singles (Official Charts) | 3 |

=== Year-end charts ===
| Chart (1980) | Position |
|---|---|
| Netherlands (Single Top 100) | 100 |
| Chart (1981) | Position |
| Netherlands (Dutch Top 40) | 91 |

== Certifications and sales ==
| Region | Certification | Certified units/sales |
|---|---|---|
| United Kingdom (BPI) | Platinum | 1,000,000^{‡} |
^{‡} Sales+streaming figures based on certification alone.
