= Our House (Madness song) =

1982 single by Madness

Single by Madness

from the album The Rise & Fall
- B-side: "Walking with Mr. Wheeze" (UK); "Cardiac Arrest" (US)
- Released: 12 November 1982
- Recorded: Autumn 1982
- Studio: AIR (London, UK)
- Genre: New wave; pop; ska
- Length: 3:23; 3:05 (radio edit)
- Label: Stiff (UK); Geffen (US)
- Songwriters: Chris Foreman; Cathal Smyth
- Producers: Clive Langer; Alan Winstanley

Madness singles chronology
"Driving in My Car" (1982)	"Our House" (1982)	"Tomorrow's (Just Another Day)" / "Madness (Is All in the Mind)" (1983)

Music video
- "Our House" on YouTube

"Our House" is a song by the English ska and pop band Madness and was written by second lead vocalist Chas Smash and guitarist Chris Foreman. It was released as the lead single from their fourth studio album, The Rise & Fall, on 12 November 1982. The song charted within the top ten in several countries, and it was the band's biggest hit on the Billboard Hot 100. It won the category Best Pop Song at the May 1983 Ivor Novello Awards.

== About ==
Released in November 1982, it peaked at No. 5 on the UK singles chart. "Our House" was their biggest hit in the US, reaching No. 7 on the Billboard Hot 100 in 1983. On the US rock chart, the song peaked at No. 9, and it reached No. 21 on the US dance chart. It received heavy airplay by radio stations.

The B-side, "Walking with Mr. Wheeze", is an instrumental composed by keyboardist Mike Barson. The title is a play on "Groovin' with Mr. Bloe", a 1970 instrumental hit by the session group Mr. Bloe. It was originally a song called "Confidence", with the demo featuring Suggs' vocals on it.

The song uses a variation on the common chord progression I–V–ii–IV, but with all chords other than the tonic changed to minor: I–v–ii–iv. This is an example of modal mixture. The same progression is played in three keys, C during the verses, D and B for the chorus.

== Music video ==
The band portrays a working-class family in the video, including one with a stubbly face, dressed in an apron and bonnet, playing the mother. The band members perform with their instruments in the living room, as they prepare for work and school. The family play squash and relax in a hot tub. The video includes exterior shots of other houses, such as the Playboy Mansion, Stocks House in Hertfordshire, and Buckingham Palace. The domestic property featured in the video is a terraced house at 47 Stephenson Street in north-west London, near Willesden Junction station.

== In popular culture ==
In 1984, Madness made a guest appearance in the series 2 episode "Sick" of The Young Ones, performing "Our House". They had previously appeared in series 1, performing "House of Fun".

A musical called Our House, featuring Madness songs, ran in London's West End between October 2002 and August 2003. A recording of the show was broadcast on BBC Three and was released as a DVD.

In Chile, the song was used in the theme song of Chilean Canal 13 TV series, Papá Mono.

In 2012, Madness performed “Our House” from the roof of Buckingham Palace as part of Queen Elizabeth II’s Diamond Jubilee.

In Australia, the song was parodied by pharmacy branch Chemist Warehouse in their advertising throughout 2014.

"Our House" was featured in a Dead Ringers parody of Jeremy Vine's Radio 2 programme on 9 July 2021.

The song was featured in the first episode of the 2024 limited series Knuckles.

== Track listing ==
- 7" single (Stiff Records – BUY 163)
1. "Our House" – 3:23
2. "Walking with Mr. Wheeze" – 3:31
- 7" single (Stiff Records – BUY JB 163)
1. "Our House (Special stretch mix)" – 3:45
2. "Walking with Mr. Wheeze" – 3:31
- US 7" single (Geffen Records – 7–29668)
1. "Our House" - 3:20
2. "Cardiac Arrest" - 2:58

("Special stretch mix" is a mostly instrumental edit of the extended mix)

- 12" single (Stiff Records – BUYIT 163)
1. "Our House" (Extended Mix) – 6:00
2. "Our House" (7" Version) – 3:23
3. "Walking with Mr. Wheeze" – 3:31
- US 12" single (Geffen Records – 0–29667)
1. "Our House (Dance mix)" – 5:02
2. "Mad House (Our House dub mix)" – 4:35

== Charts ==
=== Weekly charts ===
1982–1983 weekly chart performance for "Our House"
Chart (1982–1983)	Peak position
Australia (Kent Music Report)	17
Belgium (Ultratop 50 Flanders)	15
Canada Top Singles (RPM)	1
Denmark (IFPI)	1
Ireland (IRMA)	3
New Zealand (Recorded Music NZ)	49
Norway (VG-lista)	4
Sweden (Sverigetopplistan)	1
Switzerland (Schweizer Hitparade)	4
UK Singles (Official Charts)	5
US Billboard Hot 100	7
US Dance Club Songs (Billboard)	21
US Mainstream Rock (Billboard)	9
US Cash Box Top 100 Singles	5
West Germany (GfK)	8

2012 weekly chart performance for "Our House"
Chart (2012)	Peak position
France (SNEP)	132

2017 weekly chart performance for "Our House"
Chart (2017)	Peak position
Poland Airplay (ZPAV)	64

=== Year-end charts ===
Year-end chart performance for "Our House"
Chart (1983)	Position
Canada Top Singles (RPM)	22
US Billboard Hot 100	53
US Cash Box Top 100 Singles	46
West Germany (Official German Charts)	39

== Certifications and sales ==
Region	Certification	Certified units/sales
Canada (Music Canada)	Gold	50,000^{^}
Spain (Promusicae)	Gold	30,000^{‡}
United Kingdom (BPI)	Platinum	600,000^{‡}
^{^} Shipments figures based on certification alone.^{‡} Sales+streaming figures based on certification alone.

== See also ==
- The Young Ones
- List of number-one singles of 1983 (Canada)
- List of number-one singles and albums in Sweden
