= One Step Beyond (song) =

Single by Madness

Single by Madness

from the album One Step Beyond...
- B-side: "Mistakes"; "Nutty Theme"
- Released: 26 October 1979
- Recorded: 1979
- Genre: New wave
- Length: 2:17
- Label: Stiff
- Songwriter: Cecil Campbell
- Producers: Clive Langer; Alan Winstanley

Madness singles chronology
"The Prince" (1979)	"One Step Beyond" (1979)	"My Girl" (1979)

Music video
- "One Step Beyond" by Madness on YouTube

"One Step Beyond" is a tune written by Jamaican ska singer Prince Buster as a B-side for his 1964 single "Al Capone". It was covered by British band Madness for their debut studio album of the same name (1979). Although Buster's version was mostly instrumental except for the song title shouted for a few times, the Madness version features a spoken intro by Chas Smash and a barely audible but insistent background chant of "here we go!". The spoken line, "Don't watch that, watch this", in the intro is from another Prince Buster song, "Scorcher" — and is also used at the start of Dave and Ansell Collins' "Funky Funky Reggae" — whilst the next line "This is a heavy heavy monster sound" is taken from another Dave and Ansell Collins song, "Monkey Spanner". The first of those also became a trademark during the early promos of MTV, where the video was in heavy rotation.

According to Alan Winstanley, one of the producers, the released Madness version was a rough mix, created by taking the original 1 minute 10 second instrumental and repeating it, with the second half treated with an Eventide Harmonizer to make it sound slightly different. Langer and Winstanley intended to do a full remix but found that the double-length rough mix had already been sent for mastering before they got the opportunity.

The song is often used to begin live performances by the band.

== Music video ==
The single produced the band's first music video, directed by Chuck Statler. The video mainly features a performance on the Hope and Anchor stage in Islington, which was filmed on 7 October 1979. The video also features Chas Smash, performing the lead vocals, although he was not at the time a member of the band. Lead singer Suggs is present in the video in front of the band, holding a microphone, although he does not sing the lead vocals.

== Cover art ==
The cover art for the single is from a photoshoot by Cameron McVey. It is similar to the photograph used on the album cover art, but features the band in a slightly different pose. The Spanish release of the song also featured slightly different cover art, although the photograph used was from the same photoshoot. Even though the lyrics are performed by Chas Smash, he does not feature on the photograph, because he was not a full member of the band at the time. However, he is shown on the back cover of the album in various dancing poses. The Italian version features a two-tone drawing of the pose containing only four dancers.

== Other versions ==
The album version of the song features the full spoken introduction by Chas Smash. However, this was cut short for the single release. When the song is performed live, Smash regularly ad libs during the instrumental portions of the song.

To capitalise on the success of the song, Madness also recorded the song in different languages. The song was recorded in Spanish as "Un Paso Adelante" and in Italian as "Un Passo Avanti". Chas Smash recorded the vocals for the Spanish version on 30 June 1980 at Eden Studios. The band decided to record the song because many popular English songs at the time were being covered by Spanish artist Luis Cobos, and the band wanted to do it first. The Italian version, "Un Passo Avanti", was used to open up during the Italian part of their world tour, in October 1980.

An extended version of the song, with a run time of 3:33, is included on the 1997 US compilation Total Madness: The Very Best of Madness (Geffen GEFD-25145). It includes the full spoken introduction by Chas Smash.

== Appearances ==
In addition to its single release and appearance on the album of the same name, "One Step Beyond" also appears on the Madness collections Divine Madness (a.k.a. The Heavy Heavy Hits), Complete Madness, It's... Madness Too, Total Madness, The Business (which also includes the Italian version), Ultimate Collection and The Millennium Collection. The Spanish version appears on the 1992 releases of the "House of Fun" single. It is also used to open concerts live, and has been since the first Madstock!

== Formats and track listings ==
These are the formats and track listings of major single releases of "One Step Beyond".

7" vinyl

Side one
No.	Title	Writer(s)	Length
1.	"One Step Beyond"	Cecil Campbell	2:17

Side two
No.	Title	Writer(s)	Length
1.	"Mistakes"	John Hasler, Mike Barson	2:52

12" vinyl

Side one
No.	Title	Writer(s)	Length
1.	"One Step Beyond"	Campbell	2:17
2.	"One Step Beyond (Version)"	Campbell	2:14

Side two
No.	Title	Writer(s)	Length
1.	"Mistakes"	Hasler, Barson	2:52
2.	"Nutty Theme"	Graham McPherson, Lee Jay Thompson	2:10

7" 'Nutty Train'-shaped picture disc (Record Store Day 2019)

Side one
No.	Title	Writer(s)	Length
1.	"One Step Beyond (2009 remastered version)"	Campbell	2:15
2.	"One Step Beyond (7" version)"	Campbell	2:17

Side two
No.	Title	Writer(s)	Length
1.	"Un Paso Adelante"	Campbell	2:33
2.	"Un Passo Avanti"	Campbell	2:22

== Chart performance ==
=== Weekly charts ===
Chart (1979–1980)	Peak position
Austria (Ö3 Austria Top 40)	19
France (IFOP)	1
Ireland (IRMA)	28
Netherlands (Dutch Top 40)	34
Netherlands (Single Top 100)	29
Spain (AFE)	5
Switzerland (Schweizer Hitparade)	3
UK Singles (OCC)	7
US Billboard Hot Dance Club Play	76

=== Year-end charts ===
Chart (1980)	Peak position
France (IFOP)	12
Switzerland (Schweizer Hitparade)	19

== Certifications and sales ==
Region	Certification	Certified units/sales
France (SNEP)	Gold	500,000^{*}
United Kingdom (BPI)	Gold	400,000^{‡}
^{*} Sales figures based on certification alone.^{‡} Sales+streaming figures based on certification alone.

== See also ==
- List of number-one singles of 1980 (France)
