= It Must Be Love (Labi Siffre song) =

1971 single by Labi Siffre

"It Must Be Love" is a song written and released in 1971 by the English singer Labi Siffre on his 1972 album Crying Laughing Loving Lying. It was also recorded by ska/pop band Madness in 1981.

== Labi Siffre original ==
"It Must Be Love"
- German 7" single

Single by Labi Siffre

from the album Crying Laughing Loving Lying
- B-side: "To Find Love"
- Released: 5 November 1971
- Recorded: 1971
- Studio: Chappell Studio, London
- Genre: Pop
- Length: 3:57
- Label: Pye
- Songwriter: Labi Siffre
- Producer: Labi Siffre

Labi Siffre singles chronology
"Get to the Country" (1971)	"It Must Be Love" (1971)	"Crying, Laughing, Loving, Lying" (1972)

Audio
- "It Must Be Love" on YouTube

The original Labi Siffre recording was released as a single in 1971, and reached number 14 in January 1972 on the UK singles chart. It also appeared on his 1972 album Crying Laughing Loving Lying.

In 1994, a version of Siffre's original, with altered lyrics, was featured in an advertisement for Midland Bank. In 2007, it was featured in a UK TV advertisement for Vodafone.

=== Labi Siffre track listing ===
1. "It Must Be Love" – 3:42
2. "To Find Love" – 1:57

=== Charts ===
Chart (1971–1972)	Peak position
Australia (Kent Music Report)	46
Netherlands (Single Top 100)	25
UK Singles (Official Charts)	14

== Madness version ==
"It Must Be Love"

Single by Madness
- B-side: "Shadow on the House"; "Mrs. Hutchinson"; "Bed and Breakfast Man"; "Airplane"; "Don't Quote Me on That"
- Released: 25 November 1981
- Genre: Reggae; pop; new wave
- Length: 3:19
- Label: Stiff
- Songwriter: Labi Siffre
- Producer: Clive Langer; Alan Winstanley

Madness singles chronology
"Shut Up" (1981)	"It Must Be Love" (1981)	"Cardiac Arrest" (1982)

Music video
- "It Must Be Love" on YouTube

In late 1981, Madness released their version originally as a standalone single, reaching number 4 on the UK singles chart, and it appeared on their UK number one compilation album Complete Madness the following year, and on many other Madness compilations since. In 1983, it peaked on the US Billboard chart at number 33.

Madness's version was featured in a UK advertisement for Volvo V70 in 1999, in an advertisement for LoveFilm in 2009 and a US advertisement for the Volkswagen Passat in 2012.

In 2012, Madness performed the song with Olly Murs at V Festival.

=== Music video ===
The video mostly shows band members playing in a white room and standing over a grave. It also features guitarist Chris Foreman and saxophonist Lee Thompson playing their instruments underwater. A killer whale is also seen. Foreman appears at the start of the video warning viewers not to attempt the "very dangerous stunt" they are about to see. Labi Siffre makes a cameo appearance as a violin player.

Madness's recording was reissued in 1992, and this time reached number 6 on the UK chart. A slightly remixed version with a definite ending instead of the original fade-out, appeared on the 2002 compilation Our House: the Original Songs. In 2007, a remixed version of the Madness cover appeared in the German Edgar Wallace spoof film Neues vom Wixxer, along with a new recording called "NW5". As well as the remix to the song, a new video was filmed, including three members of the band (Suggs, Chas Smash and Dan Woodgate) along with members of the cast.

=== Madness version track listings ===
==== 1981 original issue ====
1. "It Must Be Love" – 3:19
2. "Shadow on the House" – 3:20

==== 1981 Dutch issue ====
1. "It Must Be Love"
2. "Mrs. Hutchinson"

==== 1992 reissue ====
1. "It Must Be Love" – 3:19
2. "Bed and Breakfast Man" – 2:33

==== 1992 Virgin reissue ====
1. "It Must Be Love" – 3:19
2. "Bed and Breakfast Man" – 2:33
3. "Airplane" – 2:59
4. "Don't Quote Me on That" – 4:35

Two other UK issues of the Madness version appeared but did not chart. In 1987, "It Must Be Love" was released on the re-issue label Old Gold Records, backed with "My Girl"; and, in 1988 on Virgin, Madness released a 7" to coincide with the song's appearance in The Tall Guy, backed with "The Return of the Los Palmas 7".

=== Charts ===
==== Weekly charts ====
Chart (1981–1983)	Peak position
Australia (Kent Music Report)	6
Ireland (IRMA)	5
New Zealand (Recorded Music NZ)	21
UK Singles (OCC)	4
US Billboard Hot 100	33

Chart (1992)	Peak position
Australia (ARIA)	48
Ireland (IRMA)	14
New Zealand (Recorded Music NZ)	46
UK Singles (OCC)	6
UK Airplay (Music Week)	17

==== Year-end charts ====
Chart (1982)	Rank
Australia (Kent Music Report)	56

=== Certifications ===
Region	Certification	Certified units/sales
United Kingdom (BPI)	Platinum	600,000^{‡}
^{‡} Sales+streaming figures based on certification alone.
