= Driving in My Car =

1982 single by Madness

Single by Madness
- B-side: "Animal Farm"; "Riding on My Bike"
- Released: 16 July 1982
- Recorded: 1982
- Genre: Ska, new wave, pop
- Length: 3:17
- Label: Stiff Records
- Songwriter: Mike Barson
- Producers: Clive Langer; Alan Winstanley

Madness singles chronology
"House of Fun" (1982)	"Driving in My Car" (1982)	"Our House" (1982)

Music video
- "Driving in My Car" on YouTube

"Driving in My Car" is a song by Madness. It was released as a stand-alone single on 16 July 1982 and spent eight weeks on the UK Singles Chart, peaking at number four. It reached number 20 on the Australian Singles Chart.

The writer Colin Larkin contends that the song was novel for its use of sampling, as it "[makes] use of motor car noises (revving engine, honking horn etc.) turned into percussion and musical instruments, using the Fairlight synthesizer" – he adds that this was an exception to how, outside of underground hip-hop music, "there was little interest taken by anyone in the format" of sampling at that time.

The B-side to the single was "Animal Farm", a mostly instrumental reworking of the song "Tomorrow's Dream" from the album 7. The 12" release of the single included the song "Riding on My Bike", which is basically a rewording of the main track, sung by Lee Thompson.

"Driving in My Car" was the 13th in a run of 20 consecutive UK top 20 hits for Madness, and is the only one of those 20 never to have been officially released on a Madness album in the USA. It was later included on the 2010 re-release of the band's 1982 album The Rise & Fall, as well as its two B-sides.

== Video ==
The video shows Madness as car mechanics larking about in their workshop, and in their normal suits driving around in their "Maddiemobile" – a white 1959 model Morris Minor. The members of fellow ska/pop group Fun Boy Three make a brief appearance, trying (and failing) to hitch a ride to their home town of Coventry, which the A45 mentioned in the song passes through.

== Track listing ==
- 7" single
1. "Driving in My Car" – 3:17
2. "Animal Farm (Tomorrow's Dream Warp Mix)" -4:02
- 12" single
1. "Driving in My Car" – 3:17
2. "Animal Farm (Tomorrow's Dream Warp Mix)" -4:02
3. "Riding on My Bike" – 4:35

== Certifications and sales ==
Region	Certification	Certified units/sales
United Kingdom (BPI)	Silver	250,000^{^}
^{^} Shipments figures based on certification alone.

== Charts ==
Chart (1982)	Peak position
UK Singles (Official Charts)	4
