= Mike Barson =

Scottish-born multi-instrumentalist, songwriter, and composer (born 1958)

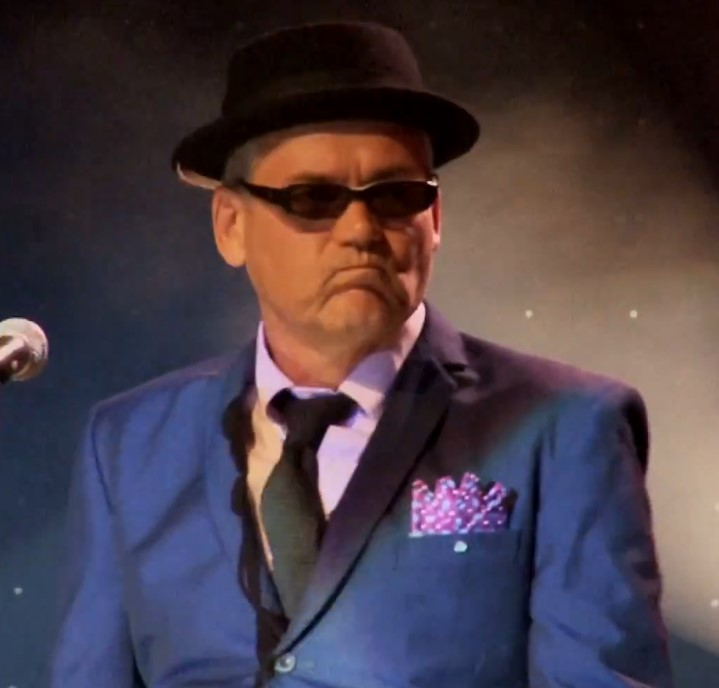
- Barson performing live with Madness in 2013

Background information
- Born: Michael Barson; 21 April 1958 (age 68); Edinburgh, Scotland
- Genres: Ska; pop; new wave; 2-tone
- Occupations: Multi-instrumentalist; songwriter; composer
- Instruments: Keyboards; piano; organ; harmonica; vibraphone; guitar; saxophone
- Years active: 1976–1984; 1986; 1989–present
- Labels: 2 Tone; Stiff; Virgin; V2; Go! Discs; Lucky 7
- Member of: Madness
- Website: madness.co.uk

Michael Barson (born 21 April 1958) is a British multi-instrumentalist, songwriter, and composer. In a career spanning more than 45 years, Barson came to prominence in the late 1970s as keyboard player for the band Madness. He is often known by the nicknames "Monsieur Barso" or "Barzo".

Barson was the primary lyricist and composer for the band, writing such hits as "My Girl", "Night Boat to Cairo", "The Return of the Los Palmas 7", "Driving in My Car", "The Sun and the Rain", and the band's only UK number one, "House of Fun". Barson left the band in 1984, shortly after completing the recording of their fifth studio album Keep Moving. Barson has been with the band since their reformation in 1992.

== Early years ==
Barson was born in Edinburgh, Scotland. He grew up in North London with his two brothers, Dan and Ben, who are also musicians, Ben being one of Roland Gift's collaborators and Dan having been a member of Bazooka Joe. At some point, his mother moved the family from Kentish Town to Crouch End. Barson learned how to play piano on a "battered upright piano" in the Muswell Hill flat he lived in.

Barson attended Brookfield School, and then Hornsey Art School, as he wanted to be a commercials artist, however Barson only completed the first foundation year as he "fucked it up a bit". He then applied for a three-year course at the London School of Printing, but turned up two hours late for an interview.

Prior to forming Madness, Barson and fellow future Madness member Lee Thompson gained some notice as graffiti artists in the mid-1970s. After reading about the emerging New York graffiti scene, they spray-painted their nicknames Mr B and Kix, along with two friends' names, Cat and Columbo, around north London. They managed to spray their nicknames on George Melly's garage door, prompting Melly to write a newspaper article declaring: "If I ever catch that Mr B, Kix and Columbo, I'm going to kick their arses".

Before Madness, Barson worked different jobs, including as a lamp post painter, hospital kitchen porter, and a gardener.

== Music career ==
=== Madness ===
==== 1976–1984: The North London Invaders and Madness ====
Barson co-founded a band called The North London Invaders in 1976 with Lee Thompson and Chris Foreman. The band later changed their name to Madness in 1979, after the song by Prince Buster. Madness became a successful British band during the late 1970s to mid-1980s, having initial success as part of the Two-Tone movement. Barson was and is a prominent songwriter in the band, writing and/or composing "My Girl", "Night Boat to Cairo", "Embarrassment", "The Return of the Los Palmas 7", "Grey Day", "House of Fun", "Driving in My Car", "Tomorrow's (Just Another Day)", and "The Sun and the Rain", and was effectively the musical director.

An error with the original pressing of "Baggy Trousers" meant that Barson was credited as a songwriter along with Foreman and Suggs. Foreman soon got in touch with their label, Stiff Records, and was informed Suggs had accidentally told them Barson was a co-writer; all future pressing correctly credit the song to "G. McPherson/C. Foreman".

===== Departure from Madness =====
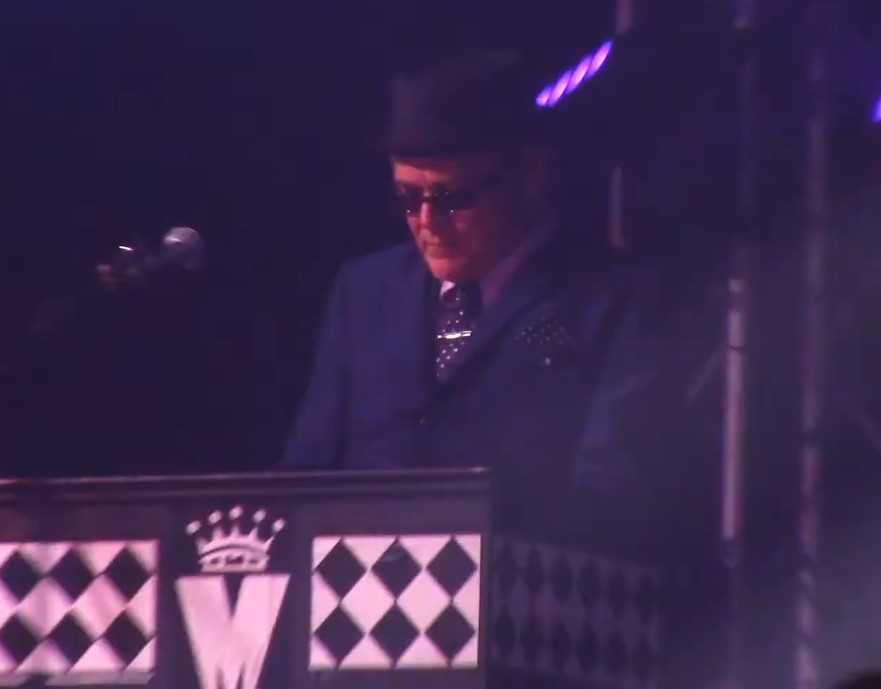
Barson in 2017

However, Barson felt increasing exhaustion from the music business, and in 1982, moved to the Netherlands with his wife, Sandra, during the recording of The Rise & Fall, and lived on a house boat in Amsterdam. He also reclused himself from the spotlight, and delayed the release of their single "Wings of a Dove", when he suddenly embarked on a campervan trip through Europe with his wife and dog, which first led to rumours that he was leaving the band. Eventually, in October 1983, he announced that he would be leaving the band, but agreed to stick around to finish the recording of their fifth studio album, Keep Moving. After playing his last gig with the band at the Lyceum Ballroom on 21 December 1983, Barson left the band in early 1984, and emigrated to the Netherlands. Two years later, Madness disbanded, but Barson did join them for the recording of their farewell single, "(Waiting For) The Ghost Train".

Speaking about his departure in a 2009 interview, Barson said: "All the musical ideas just dried up, we became so obsessed about doing something different that we ended up down a dead-end. We got to a point where we decided never to repeat ourselves, but the room just got smaller and smaller", adding in 2017: "I think we got to a point where we got a lot of expectations and it was getting very difficult to move. Anyway I found it difficult yeah, that is why I left the band."

==== 1992–present: Reformed Madness ====
Madness reunited in their original line-up in 1992, after announcing plans for a reunion concert, Madstock!, which was held at Finsbury Park, London on 8 and 9 August of that year. This reunion also included Barson, marking the first time the full seven original members of the band performed with each other since 1983. They continue to perform and release new material, and Barson eventually moved back to England in 2014.

=== Other work ===
I’ve been breathing, eating, sleeping, just getting along. Living off the fruits of the past. It’s difficult to say what I do. Time goes by and it seems to get filled. But it’s good to be writing songs with Suggs again. We’re pleased with what we’ve done so far. The plan is to release them when we’re ready. I’ve no idea when that will be.

— Barson, Q: Magnificent 6 and a Half Ride Again, March 1992

From the mid-80s to early 90s, Barson spent this time out of the public eye, remaining effectively retired from the music business. However, he was still writing and producing songs in his home studio in Amsterdam, both on his own and with some of his former bandmates. Most of these songs found their way into future Madness albums.

Barson had started writing with Suggs in 1989, with one of their first songs, "Animal", being featured in the 1990 indie film The Final Frame, which Suggs starred in. They also made use of Suggs' home studio and Liquidator Studios in North London, which the band still owned. Although they initially intended on producing a duo project, their material took form in Suggs' first solo album The Lone Ranger in 1995, which Barson co-produced.

Barson also continued writing songs with Lee Thompson during this time, including the future singles for their 1999 comeback album Wonderful; "Lovestruck" and "Drip Fed Fred". During the sessions for "Drip Fed Fred", Thompson was also able to rope in Ian Dury onto the track, who was also in Amsterdam at the time. Several other songs were later released on Madness albums, including "NW5" on The Liberty of Norton Folgate, "Soul Denying" on Can't Touch Us Now, and "Culture Vulture" on Theatre of the Absurd Presents C'est la Vie. The latter two songs had initially been rehearsed for Madstock III in 1996, with only "Culture Vulture" being performed live.

When No Doubt were recording songs for their fifth studio album Rock Steady, Barson was asked to play piano on the London version of the song "Everything in Time". Barson obliged and the track was produced by Madness producers Clive Langer and Alan Winstanley. The track was not included on the album, but was released a year later in 2003 on the compilation album Everything in Time (B-sides, Rarities, Remixes).

Both Barson and Suggs contributed to Audio Bullys' 2010 album Higher Than the Eiffel, on the tracks "Twist Me Up" and "Goodbye".

== Musicianship ==
Barson can play a variety of instruments, mostly instruments of the keyboard family, including piano and organ. He also knows how to play guitar, saxophone, and vibraphone. Barson also plays harmonica, and actually plays the harmonica solo on Madness's 1980 hit "Baggy Trousers", however their music video to the song shows trumpeter/vocalist Chas Smash miming along to the solo. According to Barson, he played the solo with a Hohner Super 64 Chromonica, and apparently that was "the first and last time" he played it.

== Personal life ==
Barson is a Buddhist. He often goes on retreats in France, which sometimes overlaps with band performances. In a 2008 interview, his ex-girlfriend Kerstin Rodgers claimed Barson "is probably a bit Aspergers". In the same interview, she criticised Barson's ex-wife, Sandra, and said that she "squashed his creativity and stopped him from playing music when they lived on the house boat in Amsterdam", and that hearing "about the divorce from Mike’s side" it seemed "abusive". Barson is 6′2″ tall.
