= Chris Foreman =

English musician, singer-songwriter, and composer (born 1956)

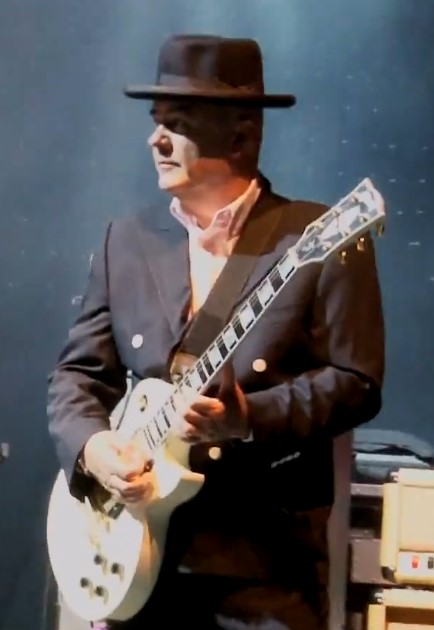
- Foreman performing live with Madness in 2013

Background information
- Also known as: Chrissy Boy
- Born: Christopher John Foreman; 8 August 1956 (age 70); St Pancras, London, England
- Genres: Ska; pop; new wave; 2-tone
- Occupations: Musician; songwriter; composer
- Instrument: Guitar
- Years active: 1976–present
- Member of: Madness
- Formerly of: The Madness, The Nutty Boys/Crunch!

Christopher John Foreman (born 8 August 1956), nicknamed Chrissy Boy, is an English musician, songwriter, and composer. In a career spanning more than 45 years, Foreman came to prominence in the late 1970s as the guitarist for the English band Madness.

== Early life ==
Christopher John Foreman was born in University College Hospital on 8 August 1956, and raised in St Pancras, London, England. His parents, John Foreman and Rita Alden, separated in 1970, and he lived with his father and his brother, Nat, near a railway in Kentish Town. It was there where he met Mike Barson and Lee Thompson.

Foreman attended a grammar school in Islington, where Alan Parker and members of Spandau Ballet also attended according to him.

His father attempted to teach him to play guitar as a child, but he could not maintain an interest. Foreman bought a cheap second-hand guitar when he was 20 and became more enthusiastic about the instrument when he began to learn chords. He then acquired a Fender Telecaster which he used whilst recording Madness' debut album.

Foreman came from a long line of music hall performers, clowns, dancers and one circus ringmaster. His father, John Foreman, was known on the folk-scene as a music hall revivalist. John Foreman was born in Somers Town on 13 January 1931. His parents were Winifred (nee Harper) and Herbert Foreman, a railway worker, in Euston. He went to William Ellis grammar school, then studied history at King’s College London. John was a teacher with a history degree, who taught at Berger school in Homerton, and who Chris described as "very left-wing". John was a printer of broadsheets, which earned him the nickname of the Broadsheet King. He died 19 April 2024, aged 93.

As a teenager, Foreman's favourite artists were "Roxy Music, Alice Cooper, the Kilburns, Motown, reggae, Hawkwind, Alex Harvey... the lot." He worked as a gardener, and a painter and decorator before Madness.

== Music ==
=== Madness ===
Foreman started jamming with keyboardist Mike Barson, after bonding over their favourite artists. Foreman and Barson then formed The North London Invaders with saxophonist Lee Thompson in 1976. After many band name and personnel changes, the group became Madness in 1979.

Foreman was one of the group's main songwriters, mostly writing music with other members, usually Suggs or Lee Thompson, providing the lyrics. Songs Foreman has co-written include "Baggy Trousers", "Cardiac Arrest", "Our House", "Madness (Is All in the Mind)", "Yesterday's Men", and "Uncle Sam".

Foreman reunited with all seven original Madness members in 1992. In 2005 Foreman announced that he was leaving the band, citing "the petty, time consuming bollocks that goes on in the band" as his reason for leaving. However, on 30 November 2006, it was confirmed that Foreman was returning to play on Madness' forthcoming UK Christmas tour. He later revealed in 2009 that he left because of a combination of how he felt about the band releasing a ska cover album and the bands behaviour: "I left because we were doing this album of ska covers (as the Dangermen), and, to me, it seemed a bit desperate. We started off doing really quirky stuff, and then one day we're back doing Israelites. And a couple of the guys were getting on my nerves a bit. I said to them not to put 'Going for a sabbatical' in any press releases, but of course they did. And I suppose it was in a way." In that same interview, Foreman's return was put down to him being "drawn by the strength of the new material".

Foreman stepped down from live performances in August 2025 after his diagnoses with myeloma. He initially said he had a "long way to go" before he could get back to touring again, but expressed hope of achieving remission and returning to performing in 2026. During his time off, Madness continued touring, with Kevin Burdett filling in for him; Burdett had previously deputised for Foreman during his break from the band from 2005 to 2006. Foreman made his comeback performance with Madness on 7 June 2026 at the Summer Fest at the Beach in Weston Super Mare.

=== The Nutty Boys/Crunch! ===
After Madness disbanded in 1986, he formed a new band The Madness with Thompson, Suggs and Chas Smash, but they broke up after releasing their debut album, the eponymous The Madness. Then Foreman, alongside Thompson, created another group called The Nutty Boys with Thompson on lead vocals. They released an album called Crunch! in 1990. The band continued to be known as Crunch!, and played in London every couple of years.

== Videography ==
=== Axecam ===
In 2006, Foreman began using a Samsung D600 mobile phone attached to his guitar to record short videos from his position on stage during live Madness performances to provide his fans with a unique perspective from the "guitar's eye view". He coined the term "Axecam" to describe this filming technique. By December 2008, he had acquired a higher quality digital Flip video camera which he attached to the shoulder strap of his guitar using an "Axecam holder", crafted by a member of the stage crew just before Madness went on stage at The O2 Arena on 19 December 2008. The new "Axecam" produced a far more stable picture and Foreman posted the first video from this performance ("It Must Be Love") to the MadnessStudio2008 Channel on YouTube on 20 December 2008.

=== Chrissy Boy Meets And Greets... ===
Foreman also maintains a series of videos made with the Axecam entitled "Chrissy Boy Meets And Greets...", in which he meets famous people that have either appeared alongside Madness at festivals, or that have attended awards ceremonies with Madness. The video is normally a close up of the famous person's face, with Foreman out of shot, and usually consists of a few spoken words, and perhaps a joke or humorous reference from Foreman to the star's career. Each clip is normally less than ten seconds long. Stars featured have included: Dizzee Rascal, Al Murray, Plan B, Alex James, Graham Coxon and Damon Albarn, former Madness singer/drummer/manager John Hasler, all six members of the reformed Specials, ex-Bodysnatcher and Madness collaborator Rhoda Dakar, Martin Freeman, Eamonn Holmes, Jeremy Clarkson, Lulu, and Peter Andre, as well as an Elvis Presley lookalike security guard from Australia.

== Personal life ==
In 1976, Foreman married Susan, his childhood sweetheart, and they have a son, Matthew (born 1976). In 1992 Foreman married his second wife Laurence, and they have a son, Felix (born 1993, Hampstead, London). In 2001 Foreman married his third wife Melissa, and they have a son, Frankie (born 2002, London), he also has a daughter, Elfie (born 2006, Brighton). In August 2023, Foreman separated from his wife and moved out of the family home to a rented bungalow in Peacehaven. He bought a house in Telscombe in September 2024, where he currently resides. He is 5'6 tall.

=== Health ===
In August 2025, Foreman revealed that he had been diagnosed with myeloma, a treatable but incurable form of blood cancer. He first experienced symptoms earlier that year, including severe pain in his upper back and shoulders, which led to an MRI scan and the discovery of a spinal tumour. Following radiotherapy and a spinal tap procedure, Foreman stated that his kidney function - initially at 12% - had "greatly improved." In June 2026, Foreman announced that his cancer had gone into full remission.
