= Chas Smash =

English singer-songwriter

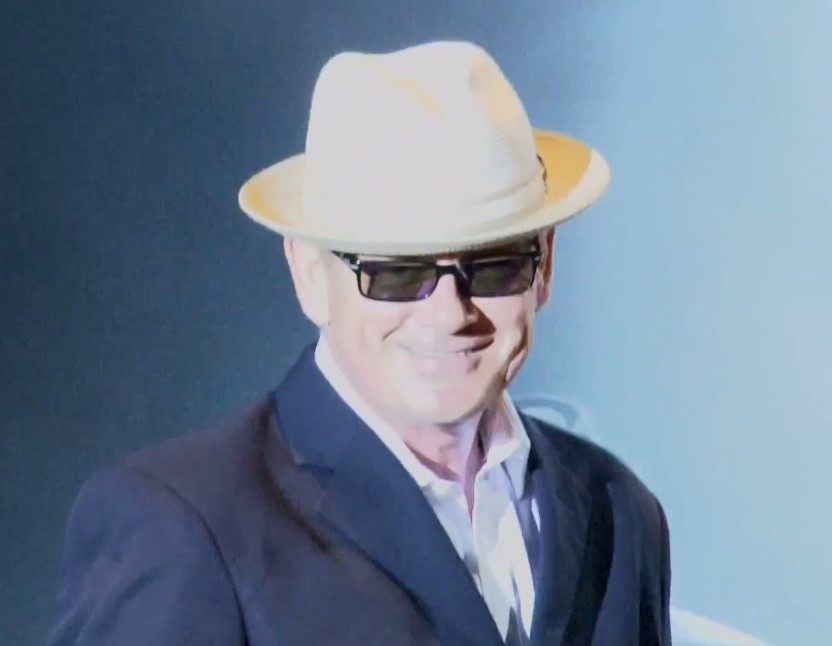
- Smash performing live with Madness in 2013

Background information
- Born: Cathal Joseph Smyth; 14 January 1959 (age 67); Fitzrovia, London, England
- Genres: Ska; pop; new wave; 2-tone
- Occupations: Singer-songwriter; multi-instrumentalist
- Instruments: Vocals; trumpet; bass
- Years active: 1978–2015
- Label: Rolled Gold
- Formerly of: Madness

Cathal Joseph "Carl" Smyth (born 14 January 1959), also known as Chas Smash, is an English singer-songwriter and multi-instrumentalist. He was the secondary vocalist, trumpet player and dancer for the English band Madness from their inception in the late 1970s until 2014.

In addition to trumpet, Smyth plays the bass guitar (having initially joined Madness as a bassist), acoustic guitar, piano, and various percussion instruments. He performs lead vocals on some Madness tracks, such as "Michael Caine", "Wings of a Dove", "One Step Beyond" and "Madness (Is All in the Mind)". Initially an occasional songwriter, he became a more frequent contributor and was credited as co-writer on the band's international hit "Our House".

== Early years ==
Cathal Joseph Patrick Smyth was born on 14 January 1959, in Middlesex Hospital, Fitzrovia, London, England, and grew up in Marylebone. As a child he went by the name of Carl. His parents were Irish immigrants. His father worked in the oil business and moved the family from Ireland to England, then to Iraq and subsequently Iran because of his work. Smyth has said he was bullied at school in both Northern Ireland and London. The Smyths were competitive Irish dancers, and Cathal grew up around dance, but never took much of an interest until he began to dance as a performer.

In 1976, the North London Invaders recruited Smyth to play the bass guitar with them when he was 17, but he was replaced the following year by Gavin Rogers. During the late 1970s, he returned to the band - which by this time had been renamed Madness - and performed as a dancer on stage at their concerts.

Smash worked several jobs, including as a window cleaner, technical clerk, and a cement pump operator, before Madness.

== Music career ==
In 1980, Smyth became the last of the seven original Madness members to join the band. He soon moved on to playing other instruments instead of bass. While not initially a major songwriter, Smyth's writing came to prominence in the albums The Rise & Fall and Keep Moving, with more of his songs being used as singles, such as "Our House", which became one of their biggest international hits. After keyboardist and founder Mike Barson left, Smyth assumed the implicated role of musical director in his place.

After Madness broke up in 1986, he formed a short-lived spin-off called The Madness in 1988 along with Suggs, Lee Thompson and Chris Foreman, which broke up in the summer. This left Smyth in uncertainty, who tried to form a new band to no avail, and also considered returning to a career in petrochemicals before starting a career in A&R.

However, in 1992, Smyth facilitated the release of their commercially successful greatest hits album, Divine Madness, which peaked at number 1 in the UK Album Charts. This helped him initiate Madness to reform in 1992 for Madstock!, their first gig in six years.

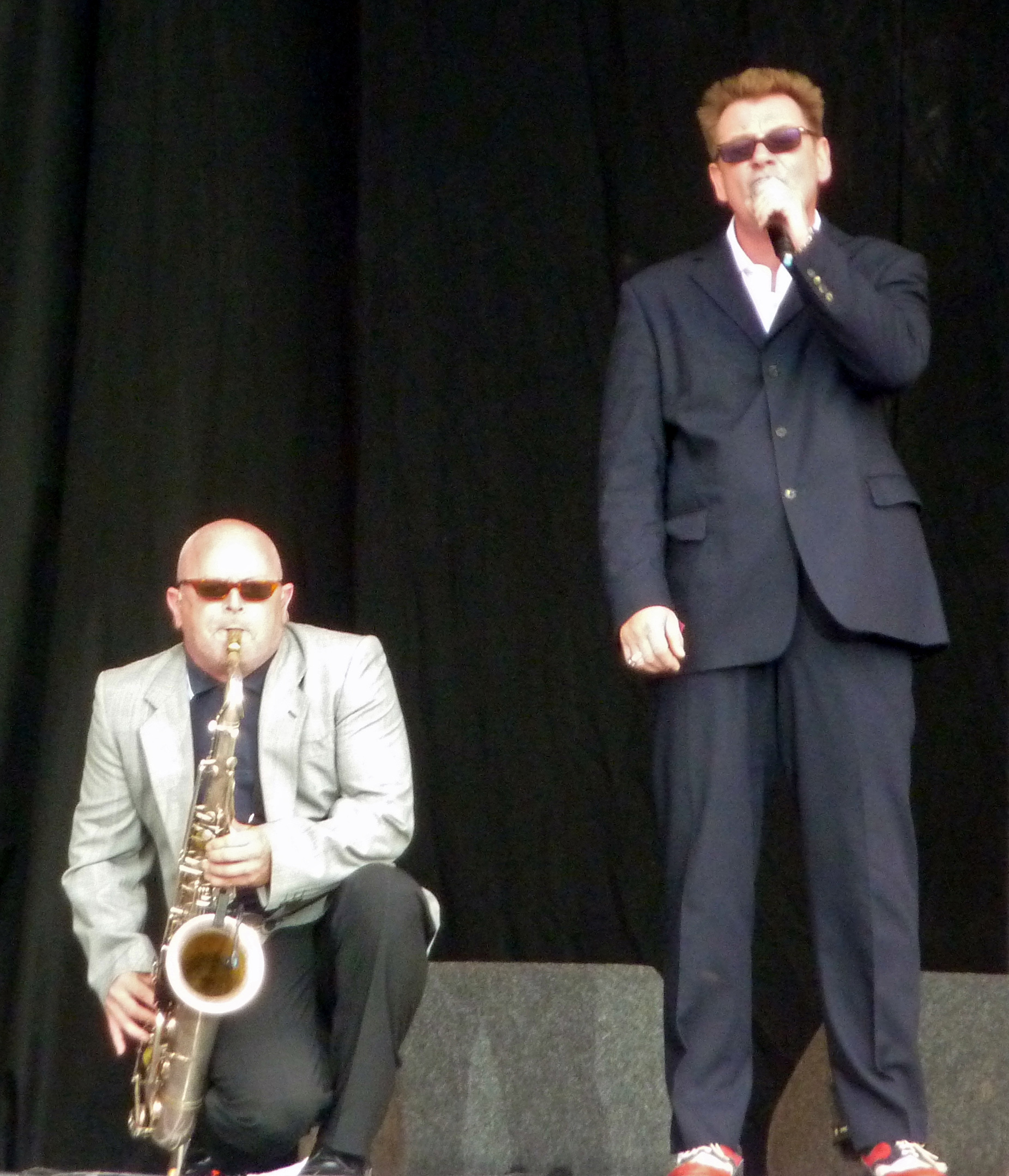
Smash (right) performing on stage with Madness, next to Lee Thompson, in 2009

Cathal also had a small part in Suggs' solo career, co-writing the song "Green Eyes", and he also performed backing vocals on The Lone Ranger album. In 1999, Smyth formed and fronted the folk-influenced band The Velvet Ghost, which played at the Fleadh festival in 2000.

In 1999, Madness released their first album of new material in ten years, Wonderful. This was followed up six years (2005) later with The Dangermen Sessions Vol. 1, and in 2009 Madness released The Liberty of Norton Folgate, and Oui Oui, Si Si, Ja Ja, Da Da (2012).

=== Departure from Madness ===
It was like An American Werewolf In London, that scene where he wakes up from a dream, but it’s still a dream, then he wakes up again and again. I was going through sleepless nights, like, have I done the right thing? This was my day job! I might end up poor in a garret in Paris! Then, a leap of faith is leap of faith. I applied a bit of the old Sun Tzu aspect, which is – burn your boats and leap. Otherwise I wouldn’t have done it, I would just be there forever.

— Smyth, Hot Press, July 2015

Smyth announced that he was leaving Madness in October 2014, having abruptly left the previous summer tour in July due to a sudden illness. His departure was characterized at the time as a break to concentrate on his solo career and not necessarily a permanent departure, but he has not rejoined the band.

Smyth's debut solo album, A Comfortable Man, was released in May 2015 and reached No. 68 in the UK Albums Chart. In 2016, Madness released Can't Touch Us Now, the first Madness album since One Step Beyond, to be recorded without Smyth being credited as a member of the band.

Smyth has still been partially involved with some of the band's projects, such as their collective 2019 autobiography Before We Was We and the accompanying miniseries adaptation in 2021. He also appeared with Suggs, Barson, Bedford, and Woodgate at the Camden Walk Of Fame in March 2020, which has been his most recent public appearance to date.

Since mid-2015, Smyth has been largely absent from the public spotlight. When asked in a 2026 interview with MOJO about Smyth and whether he would return to Madness, Suggs stated "Well, he wanted to take a break, and then the break sort of went on. He writes poetry and stuff, but hasn’t felt inclined to write pop music for a while… so I don’t know. That’s in the lap of the gods."

=== A&R career ===
In 1989, Smyth became an A&R executive for Go! Discs and, during his tenure, he signed The Stairs to the label in late 1991. He mainly worked with The La's and helped them promote their eponymous album, The La's, in America. He also worked with artists such as the Trashcan Sinatras, Paul Weller, and Billy Bragg. He left the label in late 1992 after Madness reformed.

In late 1990, he became friends with former Smiths singer Morrissey, who had once asked him to be his manager. Smyth declined, claiming "I didn't fancy having to iron his socks." Smyth introduced Morrissey to Boz Boorer, who went on to work with him from 1991 onwards. He also provided backing vocals on Morrissey's version of the Jam's "That's Entertainment". Cathal is also the subject of the 1992 Morrissey single "You're the One for Me, Fatty".

In 2002, Smyth started his own record label, Rolled Gold Records (RGR Music), at an office in Camden Town. He released a debut single, "We're Coming Over", with The England Supporters Band (billed as Mr. Smash & Friends) and it reached number 67 in the UK Singles Charts. RGR released an album and three singles by London rapper Just Jack. The label also released material by dance and rap artists Autamata and Border Crossing. In 2004, after briefly moving his office to Islington, he closed RGR.

== Personal life ==
Raised as a Roman Catholic in childhood, Smyth has referred to himself as a "collapsed catholic". He's also regularly attended Buddhist retreats with Mike Barson since 1989. He also became a Freemason in 1994. He is 5'11 tall.

After being a couple since their teen years, Smyth and his wife of 28 years, Joanna Brown, separated in 2005. He has three grown-up children from the marriage: Caspar, Milo, and Eloise. He appeared with Eloise at the 2012 Q Awards ceremony.

After his marriage ended, Smyth started to practise transcendental meditation. He also spent time in rehab in Arizona, believing that if he hung "around I'll just start doing drugs and drink", saying it "cost (him) a fortune, but it was the best thing I ever did. I found out the core issues: why I behave the way I do. Changed my life. Lost weight. Got focused." He also moved to Ibiza in 2008.

In January 2017, Smyth was diagnosed with a cancerous tumour and, after having it removed, went through a six-week procedure of radiotherapy starting in March. On 11 August, he announced on Facebook that he had been given "the all clear".

== Solo discography ==
=== Studio albums ===
- A Comfortable Man (11 May 2015) – UK No. 68

=== Singles ===
Year	Single	Peak position	Album
Year	Single	UK	Album
2002	"We're Coming Over" (as Mr Smash & Friends)	67	Non-album single
2015	"Do You Believe In Love?" (as Cathal Smyth)	—	A Comfortable Man
"—" denotes a recording that did not chart or was not released in that territory.
