= Alan Winstanley =

English record producer and songwriter (born 1952)

- Born: Alan Kenneth Winstanley; 2 November 1952 (age 73); Fulham, London, England
- Genres: Rock; pop; new wave
- Occupations: Record producer; songwriter
- Years active: 1970s–present

Alan Kenneth Winstanley (win-STAN-lee; born 2 November 1952) is an English record producer and songwriter, active from the mid-1970s onwards. He usually works with Clive Langer.

== Early life ==
He was born in Fulham in November 1952 to parents Ken and Doreen. After playing guitar in local groups he started his career at TW Studios in Fulham.

== Career ==
His early career during the mid-1970s was as an audio engineer, working on albums by the Stranglers in addition to releases by Joe Jackson and Generation X. He also worked with songwriter Brian Wade, producing teen pop singer Nikki Richards' single "Oh Boy!" in 1978.

== Notable studio albums produced or co-produced by Winstanley ==
- Generation X (1978) (Winstanley engineered).
- One Step Beyond... – Madness (1979)
- The Raven – The Stranglers (1979)
- 4 Out of 5 Doctors – 4 Out of 5 Doctors (1980)
- Absolutely – Madness (1980)
- Kilimanjaro – The Teardrop Explodes (1980)
- 7 – Madness (1981)
- Eddie, Old Bob, Dick and Gary – Tenpole Tudor (1981)
- Too-Rye-Ay – Dexys Midnight Runners (1982)
- The Rise & Fall – Madness (1982)
- Punch the Clock – Elvis Costello and the Attractions (1983)
- Goodbye Cruel World – Elvis Costello and the Attractions (1984)
- Despite Straight Lines – Marilyn (1985)
- People – Hothouse Flowers (1988)
- Flood – They Might Be Giants (1990)
- Home – Hothouse Flowers (1990)
- Kill Uncle – Morrissey (1991)
- Sixteen Stone – Bush (1994)
- One Day at a Time – Symposium (1997)
- The Science of Things – Bush (1999)
- Mink Car – They Might Be Giants (2001)
- Lifelines – a-ha (2002)
- Please Describe Yourself – Dogs Die in Hot Cars (2004)
- Despite Straight Lines: The Very Best of Marilyn – Marilyn (2008)
- The Liberty of Norton Folgate – Madness (2009)
