= Total Madness – The Very Best of Madness =

Total Madness – the Very Best of Madness

Greatest hits album by Madness
- Released: 9 September 1997
- Recorded: 1979–1985
- Genre: Ska; pop
- Label: Geffen
- Producer: Clive Langer; Alan Winstanley

Madness chronology
The Business – the Definitive Singles Collection (1993)	Total Madness – the Very Best of Madness (1997)	Universal Madness (1998)

Professional ratings
Review scores
Source	Rating
AllMusic	3/5 stars

Total Madness – the Very Best of Madness is a greatest hits album by a British ska/pop band Madness, released in 1997. It was released exclusively in the United States and Canada. It features liner notes from the former frontman of The Might Mighty Bosstones, Dicky Barrett.

== Critical reception ==
In a retrospective review for AllMusic, critic Stephen Thomas Erlewine gave the album three out of five stars and wrote that the album "[is] an overview of Madness in their decline, with a couple of earlier hits thrown in for good measure."

== Track listing ==
1. "Our House" (Cathal Smyth, Chris Foreman) – 3:20
2. "It Must Be Love" (Labi Siffre) – 3:18
3. "Tomorrow's (Just Another Day)" (Smyth, Michael Barson) – 3:09
4. "Shut Up" (Foreman, Graham McPherson) – 3:26
5. "Grey Day" (Barson) – 3:38
6. "The Sun and the Rain" (Barson) – 3:30
7. "Wings of a Dove (A Celebratory Song)" (Smyth, McPherson) – 3:03
8. "Michael Caine" (Smyth, Daniel Woodgate) – 3:36
9. "One Better Day" (McPherson, Mark Bedford) – 4:06
10. "Uncle Sam" (Foreman, Lee Thompson) – 4:16
11. "Yesterday's Men" (Foreman, McPherson) – 4:32
12. "One Step Beyond" (Cecil Campbell) – 3:33 (Version exclusive to compilation)
