= Madness (Madness album) =

Compilation album by Madness
- Released: 1983
- Recorded: 1979–1983
- Genres: Ska; pop; two-tone; new wave
- Length: 39:13
- Label: Geffen
- Producers: Clive Langer; Alan Winstanley

Madness chronology
The Rise & Fall (1982)	Madness (1983)	Keep Moving (1984)

Madness is a compilation album by the English ska/pop band Madness. It was issued primarily for the North American market in order to capitalise on the top 10 success in the United States of their hit single "Our House" from the 1982 album Madness Presents the Rise & Fall, which had not been available there.

== Content ==
Madness features six tracks from The Rise & Fall album, three from the 1981 album 7, one from the 1979 debut album One Step Beyond... and two single a-sides. The 1980 album Absolutely is not represented on the compilation.

The album contains every UK single from "Grey Day" to "Tomorrow's (Just Another Day)", with the exception of "Driving in My Car", which has never been issued on any US compilation. However, the album was also issued in Japan where "Driving in My Car" replaced "Rise & Fall".

== Critical reception ==
Professional ratings
Review scores
Source	Rating
AllMusic	4/5 stars
Rolling Stone	3.5/5 stars

Rolling Stone's J. D. Considine gave the album a rave review, saying that it introduced the best tracks from Madness's earlier albums to an American audience, while leaving out any songs with insular British cultural references. He praised the uniquely British "economy and wit" of the melodies and the sobering lyrics, remarking that "Madness offers up all of the clichés of traditional British entertainment - but with a twist, revealing the hard realities behind the soothing illusions."

== Track listing ==
1. "Our House" 1982 single from The Rise & Fall
2. "Tomorrow's (Just Another Day)" 1983 single mix, originally from The Rise & Fall
3. "It Must Be Love" remixed version issued in North America as the follow-up to Our House
4. "Primrose Hill" from The Rise & Fall
5. "Shut Up" 1981 edited single mix, the full version of which appeared on 7
6. "House of Fun" original full 1982 single version, featuring the fairground ending
7. "Night Boat to Cairo" remixed and slightly shorter than the version which appears on One Step Beyond...
8. "Rise and Fall" from The Rise & Fall
9. "Blue Skinned Beast" from The Rise & Fall
10. "Cardiac Arrest" 1982 remixed single version, originally from 7
11. "Grey Day" 1981 single which appeared on 7
12. "Madness (Is All in the Mind)" 1983 single mix, originally from The Rise & Fall

== Charts ==
=== Weekly charts ===
Chart (1983)	Peak position
US Billboard 200	41

=== Year-end charts ===
Chart (1983)	Position
US Billboard 200	93
