= Universal Madness =

Live album by Madness
- Released: 2 March 1999
- Recorded: 26 April 1998
- Venues: Universal Amphitheatre, Los Angeles
- Genres: Ska; pop
- Length: 43:48
- Label: Goldenvoice

Madness chronology
Madstock! (1992)	Universal Madness (1999)	Wonderful (1999)

Professional ratings
Review scores
Source	Rating
AllMusic	link

Universal Madness is the second live album by the ska/pop band Madness, released on 2 March 1999 (see 1999 in music) through the Goldenvoice label. It was recorded at the Universal Amphitheater on 26 April 1998 in Los Angeles. The show was Madness' first in America since 1984.

== Reception ==
As the album features most of the band's singles, it "ultimately serves as mere nostalgia," according to AllMusic, "not quite a hollow experience, but not an epiphany either." They felt that while the album "doesn't disappoint too greatly, it rarely captures the giddy glee Madness can pull off," adding that the band "sounds fine in a workmanlike way." Trouser Press wrote, "The musicianship is tight as ever ([Lee] Thompson sounds particularly inspired on sax) and the sound quality is good, but [Graham] McPherson's singing falters more and more as the disc goes on. ... Madstock! is the better choice for anyone searching for a disc of live Madness."

== Track listing ==
No.	Title	Writer(s)	Length
1.	"One Step Beyond"	Cecil Campbell	3:25
2.	"Embarrassment"	Mike Barson, Lee Thompson	3:14
3.	"The Prince"	Thompson	3:28
4.	"The Sun and the Rain"	Barson	3:52
5.	"My Girl"	Barson	2:51
6.	"Shut Up"	Graham McPherson, Chris Foreman	3:21
7.	"Baggy Trousers"	McPherson, Foreman	2:37
8.	"It Must Be Love"	Labi Siffre	3:39
9.	"Bed and Breakfast Man"	Barson	2:21
10.	"Our House"	Cathal Smyth, Foreman	3:52
11.	"Swan Lake"	Pyotr Ilyich Tchaikovsky; arranged by Barson	3:27
12.	"Night Boat to Cairo"	McPherson, Barson	4:02
13.	"Madness"	Campbell	3:39

== Personnel ==
Madness

- Graham "Suggs" McPherson – lead vocals
- Mike Barson – keyboards
- Chris Foreman – guitar
- Lee Thompson – saxophone, backup vocals
- Daniel Woodgate – drums
- Mark Bedford – bass
- Cathal Smyth – backup vocals, trumpet

Technical

- Cedric Singleton – executive producer
- Guy Charbonneau – engineer
- Charlie Bouis – assistant engineer
- Jerry Finn – mixing
- Chuck Sperry – artwork
- Ron Donovan – layout, design
