= Work Rest and Play =

EP by Madness
- Released: 21 March 1980
- Recorded: 1979–1980
- Genre: Ska; 2-tone
- Length: 12:02
- Label: Stiff
- Producer: Clive Langer; Alan Winstanley

Madness chronology
| One Step Beyond... (1979) | Work Rest and Play (1980) | Absolutely (1980) |

Work Rest and Play is an EP by the English ska and pop band Madness, released on 21 March 1980. The EP was headlined by the song "Night Boat to Cairo", from the band's debut studio album One Step Beyond... (1979). It entered the UK Singles Chart on 5 April 1980, reaching a high of number 6.

== Background ==
After the release of "My Girl", the band felt that they had exhausted the material from One Step Beyond..., and did not want to release any more singles from the album. However, Dave Robinson, head of Stiff Records, disagreed. Eventually, a compromise was made, and the band decided to release an EP featuring one album track and three new tracks. The Work Rest and Play EP was the result.

== Content ==
The EP's success was largely down to "Night Boat to Cairo", which headlined the set and had an accompanying music video. The fourth song, "Don't Quote Me on That", was a commentary on press coverage which had tried to paint the band as racists who supported the National Front (NF). Some of the band's shows had been disrupted by skinhead violence and, in a 1979 NME interview, Madness member Chas Smash was quoted as saying "We don't care if people are in the NF as long as they're having a good time." This was quoted to add to the speculation that Madness was a racist band supporting the National Front, although the band members denied those allegations.

A promotional 12-inch single was issued in the UK featuring "Don't Quote Me on That" backed with the One Step Beyond... track "Swan Lake". The version of "Don't Quote Me on That" is a different, shorter mix from the one eventually used on the UK EP, and seems to have been used in all European countries outside the UK. It can be heard during the opening titles of the Madness film Take It or Leave It.

The 2010 re-release of One Step Beyond... includes the three original songs from the Work Rest and Play EP as bonus tracks on a second CD.

== International releases ==
Releases varied. Some countries opted to issue "Night Boat to Cairo" as a two-track 45 rpm single, containing a variety of B-sides: in France "Swan Lake"; in Belgium "The Young and the Old" and in Germany "Don't Quote Me on That". In the Netherlands "Night Boat to Cairo" was the B-side and "Tarzan's Nuts" from One Step Beyond... was the A-side of the 45 rpm single; this is in addition to the 33 rpm EP which was also issued there. In Portugal, the EP featured a different mix of "Night Boat to Cairo".

In the UK 45 rpm DJ and jukebox editions were printed up with "Deceives the Eye" as the B-side. In Italy a 33 rpm 12-inch single was released with "Un Passo Avanti" ("One Step Beyond" sung in Italian) and "Night Boat to Cairo" on one side and "The Young and the Old" and "Don't Quote Me on That" on the other.

When the "Grey Day"-led 6-track 12-inch EP was released in Japan in 1981, it contained the three 1980-recorded Work Rest and Play EP tracks, two of which were alternate mixes; the aforementioned "Don't Quote Me on That" plus "Deceives the Eye" which ends cleanly without Suggs's echoing, fading vocal.

== "Night Boat to Cairo" music video ==
Lee Thompson plays saxophone.

After the decision to issue the EP, a promotional music video was needed. However, there was a lack of time before the release, and not enough to make an effective one. As "Night Boat to Cairo" was the leading track from the EP, a music video of the song was created to represent the EP as a whole.

Madness filmed a karaoke type video in front of a blatantly chroma keyed backdrop of an Egyptian pyramid, with the lyrics appearing on screen in "bouncing ball" style as Suggs sang them. During the long instrumental sections of the song, the band often run around the set, marching and performing their signature "Nutty Train".

Despite the video's poor effects and unprofessional feel, it became very popular amongst fans. This is possibly due to the carefree nature and fooling around of the band, probably down to the large amount of alcohol drunk while filming.

== Track listing ==
Side one
| No. | Title | Writer(s) | Length |
|---|---|---|---|
| 1. | "Night Boat to Cairo" | Graham McPherson, Mike Barson | 3:30 |
| 2. | "Deceives the Eye" | Mark Bedford, Chris Foreman | 1:58 |

Side two
| No. | Title | Writer(s) | Length |
|---|---|---|---|
| 1. | "The Young and the Old" | McPherson, Barson | 2:03 |
| 2. | "Don't Quote Me on That" | Peter Tosh, Chas Smash | 4:31 |

== Personnel ==
Madness

- Graham "Suggs" McPherson – lead vocals
- Mike Barson – keyboards
- Chris Foreman – electric guitar
- Mark Bedford – bass guitar
- Lee Thompson – saxophone
- Daniel Woodgate – drums
- Chas Smash – backing vocals, lead vocals on "Don't Quote Me on That".
