= Uncle Sam (song) =

1985 single by Madness

Single by Madness

from the album Mad Not Mad
- B-side: "Please Don't Go"; "Inanity Over Christmas"
- Released: 14 October 1985
- Genre: Ska; pop
- Length: 3:04
- Label: Zarjazz
- Songwriters: Lee Thompson; Chris Foreman
- Producers: Clive Langer; Alan Winstanley

Madness singles chronology
"Yesterday's Men" (1985)	"Uncle Sam" (1985)	"Sweetest Girl" (1986)

Music video
- "Uncle Sam" on YouTube

"Uncle Sam" is a song by the English ska and pop band Madness from their sixth studio album Mad Not Mad (1985). It was predominantly written by saxophonist Lee Thompson, but also jointly credited to guitarist Chris Foreman.

== Background ==
The single spent 11 weeks on the UK Singles Chart peaking at No. 21, ending a run of 20 consecutive top 20 entries stretching back to their 1979 debut "The Prince". It did however, peak at No. 17 on the Irish Singles Chart.

It was also issued in a 'Flag Bag' – the 7-inch single wrapped in an American flag with the Russian translation of "Uncle Sam" printed on the flag. The song's lyrics are the narrative of a soldier's experiences in World War II. The track was edited for release as a single, the album version being over a minute longer.

== Music video ==
To accompany the single the band released a music video which can be viewed as a parody of US participation in the Second World War. The video opens with a milk float approaching a row of British terraced houses. A man, dressed in suit and a cowboy hat, with a briefcase, walks down the path from the front door gesticulating and hollering. A paperboy and other working men approach along the pavement. A news announcer breaks in with an "important announcement," and the video cuts to a toy battleship sailing on a map table in an upper room of one of the houses. The man operating the ship is dressed in a military uniform, wearing a World War II type steel helmet and a French Foreign Legion jacket with large epaulettes. His uniform includes the 1st Foreign Regiment and 2nd Foreign Parachute Regiment wings insignia. The music begins.

The singer, sat outside on a pillar box, interacts with the working men. As he sings, he dons a wizard's hat and the house's garden is transformed into a battlefield with an armed jeep, a fallen bomb and a barbed wire fence where troops are attacking the row of houses. The troops, all sporting wizard hats, succeed in taking the house and sit, snacking, on the sofa. The scene changes to an improbably tiny desert island with the US flag, with the band dressed in US naval uniforms. The General figure sits reading the Gung Ho Yearbook 1985.

The troops from the house arrive with their bomb, which they explode. Back at the terraced house, a man dressed as a woman appears, breaks plates and attacks the General figure and wrestles him to the ground. The wizard sits in the house and sings. The band plays on the island. The scene changes and the band, dressed in naval uniforms, launches in an amphibious vehicle. The band proceed down the River Thames in central London, waving to passing boats and saluting a prominent nearby building. The scene cuts back and forth from the river to the island, to the house. The video ends with a giant can of Coke, dropped by the General in the house, falling onto the island.

== Appearances ==
In addition to its single release and appearance on the studio album Mad Not Mad, "Uncle Sam" also appears on the Madness collections Divine Madness (1992; a.k.a. The Heavy Heavy Hits), The Business (1993), and Total Madness (1997).

== Critical reception ==
Upon its release as a single, David Quantick of NME picked "Uncle Sam" as the magazine's "single of the week". He described it as "the most cheerful track, with its great nursery-school tune of a chorus and winsome bluebeat skip", and added that the lyric is "at once oblique and sharp" and "a little more sophisticated than the average ban the bomb ditty". Roger Morton of Record Mirror wrote, "Displaying a healthy glaze of ska-tissue rhythm, Madness set sail against Rambo-land, armed with a deceptively chirpy tune and a camouflaged lyric." Vici MacDonald of Smash Hits described it as "an optimistic singalong calypso thingie, which, like most Madness songs, turns out to be quite depressing once you start listening to the lyrics". Karen Swayne of Number One praised it as "another fine single" from Madness and added, "[It] has a jollier feel than 'Yesterday's Men', with a skanky beat reminiscent of their earlier stuff, but the message of anti-American imperialism reflects their growing maturity."

== Track listing ==
- 7-inch single
1. "Uncle Sam" – 3:04 (horns: – Gary Barnacle)
2. "Please Don't Go" – 3:21
- 12-inch single
1. "Uncle Sam (Raygun Mix)" – 6:42
2. "Uncle Sam (demo)"
3. "Please Don't Go" – 3:26
- 7-inch picture disc

A-side (45 rpm)

1. "Uncle Sam" – 3:04

B-side (33 rpm)

1. "Please Don't Go" – 3:26
2. "Inanity Over Christmas" – 3:50

== Charts ==
Chart (1985)	Peak position
UK Singles (OCC)	21
Irish Singles Chart	17
