= The Rise & Fall =

Studio album by Madness
- Released: 5 November 1982
- Recorded: August–October 1982
- Studio: AIR Studios (London)
- Genres: Pop; new wave; 2 tone
- Length: 43:04
- Label: Stiff
- Producers: Clive Langer; Alan Winstanley

Madness chronology
7 (1981)	The Rise & Fall (1982)	Keep Moving (1984)

Singles from The Rise & Fall
- 1. "Our House" Released: 12 November 1982; 2. "Tomorrow's (Just Another Day)" / "Madness (Is All in the Mind)" Released: 1 February 1983

The Rise & Fall is the fourth studio album by English ska band Madness, released on 5 November 1982 by Stiff Records. This album saw Madness at their most experimental, exhibiting a range of musical styles including jazz, English music hall, and Eastern influences. NME described it at the time of its release as "the best Madness record". It has often been retrospectively described as a concept album.

Though the album was never released in the US, several tracks were later placed on the compilation Madness (1983), including "Our House", the band's only top 10 hit in America.

== Content ==
Initially conceived as a concept album about nostalgia for childhood by secondary vocalist Chas Smash, the concept was eventually dropped, though the original theme is still evident particularly in the title track and the album's major hit "Our House", as well as tracks like "Rise and Fall" and "Sunday Morning." This theme was also mentioned recently when interviewed as part of T in the Park highlights, where their lead vocalist Suggs claimed that all the band members were told to write about their childhood memories for The Rise & Fall (although he did say that their keyboardist Mike Barson got the wrong idea, and went off and wrote about New Delhi).

Although the band had previously been avowedly apolitical, the track "Blue Skinned Beast" was an overt satire on then-UK Prime Minister Margaret Thatcher and her handling of the Falklands War, paving the way for more political comment on subsequent Madness albums.

The album cover photo was shot just west of Camden Town at the Primrose Hill viewpoint, looking southeast towards central London with the BT Tower on the horizon. In the cover photo, the band members are each dressed to represent one the songs on the album, with Barson notably putting on brownface to represent "New Delhi".

Retroactively, bassist Mark Bedford has explained that the band rarely plays songs from the album as the arrangements of the tracks are "so f---ing complicated".

== Critical reception ==
Professional ratings
Review scores
Source	Rating
AllMusic	4.5/5 stars
Classic Pop	4/5 stars
Mojo	4/5 stars
Record Mirror	4/5 stars
The Rolling Stone Album Guide	3.5/5 stars
Smash Hits	6/10
Sounds	3/5 stars
Uncut	3/5 stars

In a retrospective review for AllMusic, critic Stephen Thomas Erlewine wrote that despite the evident influence of the Kinks and Ian Dury, "The Rise & Fall is recognizably Madness in sound and sensibility; faint echoes of their breakneck nutty beginnings can be heard on 'Blue Skinned Beast' and 'Mr. Speaker Gets the Word', the melodies are outgrowths of such early masterpieces as 'My Girl', there's a charming, open-hearted humor and carnivalesque swirl that ties everything together." He further noted that its songs possess a uniform "wit, effervescence, and joy, capturing what British pop life was all about in 1982, just as Village Green Preservation Society did in 1968 or Blur's Parklife would do in 1994."

The album was included in the book 1001 Albums You Must Hear Before You Die (2005).

In an interview with Popular 1 Magazine, guitarist Kavus Torabi of Cardiacs named The Rise & Fall as one of his favourite albums.

== Track listing ==
Side one
No.	Title	Writer(s)	Length
1.	"Rise and Fall"	Graham McPherson; Chris Foreman	3:16
2.	"Tomorrow's (Just Another Day)"	Cathal Smyth; Mike Barson	3:10
3.	"Blue Skinned Beast"	Lee Thompson	3:22
4.	"Primrose Hill"	McPherson; Foreman	3:36
5.	"Mr. Speaker (Gets the Word)"	McPherson; Barson	2:59
6.	"Sunday Morning"	Daniel Woodgate	4:01

Side two
No.	Title	Writer(s)	Length
7.	"Our House"	Foreman; Smyth	3:23
8.	"Tiptoes"	McPherson; Barson	3:29
9.	"New Delhi"	Barson	3:40
10.	"That Face"	McPherson; Foreman	3:39
11.	"Calling Cards"	Thompson; Foreman	2:19
12.	"Are You Coming (With Me)"	Thompson; Barson	3:17
13.	"Madness (Is All in the Mind)"	Foreman	2:53
Total length:			43:04

2010 reissue

In 2009 and 2010, Madness re-released their entire back catalogue of studio albums up until 1999's Wonderful with a bonus CD and extra tracks. The Rise & Fall was reissued by Union Square Music's collector's label Salvo in June 2010.

CD 1
The original album
- The first disc contains the thirteen tracks from the original album and four promo videos.
The promo videos

1. "House of Fun"
2. "Driving in My Car"
3. "Our House"
4. "Tomorrow's (Just Another Day)"

CD 2

The Kid Jensen session
No.	Title	Writer(s)	Length
1.	"Rise and Fall" (recorded 24 June 1982 for BBC Radio 1 at Maida Vale Studio 4, London)	McPherson, Foreman	2:38
2.	"Tomorrow's (Just Another Day)" (recorded 24 June 1982 for BBC Radio 1 at Maida Vale Studio 4, London)	Smyth, Barson	3:01
3.	"Calling Cards" (recorded 24 June 1982 for BBC Radio 1 at Maida Vale Studio 4, London)	Thompson, Foreman	2:05
4.	"Are You Coming (With Me)" (recorded 24 June 1982 for BBC Radio 1 at Maida Vale Studio 4, London)	Thompson, Barson	2:46

The bonus tracks
No.	Title	Writer(s)	Length
5.	"House of Fun" (7" single)	Thompson, Barson	3:00
6.	"Don't Look Back" (B-Side to "House of Fun")	Foreman	3:35
7.	"Driving in My Car" (7" single)	Barson	3:18
8.	"Animal Farm" (Tomorrow's Dream Warp Mix) (B-Side to "Driving in My Car")	Barson, Mark Bedford, Foreman, McPherson, Smyth, Thompson, Woodgate	4:04
9.	"Riding on My Bike" (B-side to "Driving in My Car" 12")	Thompson, Barson	5:37
10.	"Our House" (12" extended version)	Smyth, Foreman	5:58
11.	"Walking with Mr. Wheeze" (B-side to "Our House")	Barson	3:33
12.	"Mad House" ("Our House" Instrumental Mix – USA 12")	Smyth, Foreman	4:39
13.	"Tomorrow's (Just Another Day)" (Warped 12" single)	Smyth, Barson	3:46
14.	"Blue Beast" (Warp Mix) (B-Side to "Tomorrow's (Just Another Day)" 12")	Thompson	3:16
15.	"Our House" (Stretch Mix) (DJ promo single)	Smyth, Foreman	5:32
16.	"Tomorrow's (Just Another Day)" (with Elvis Costello) ("Tomorrow's (Just Another Day)" 12")	Smyth, Barson	2:57
17.	"The National Anthem" (live at The Prince's Trust Rock Gala, Dominion Theatre, London, 21 July 1982)	Traditional; arranged by Barson, Bedford, Foreman, McPherson, Smyth, Thompson and Woodgate	1:14
Total length:			59:46

== Personnel ==
Madness

- Graham 'Suggs' McPherson – lead vocals
- Mike Barson – keyboards, harmonica, piano
- Chris Foreman – guitars
- Lee Thompson – saxophones
- Daniel Woodgate – drums
- Mark Bedford – bass guitar, double bass
- Cathal Smyth – backing vocals, trumpet, lead vocals on "Madness (Is All in the Mind)"

Additional Personnel

- Geraldo D'Arbilly – additional percussion
- David Bedford – brass and string arrangements

Production and artwork

- Clive Langer – producer
- Alan Winstanley – producer
- David Wooley – engineer
- Jeremy Allom – engineer
- Arun Chakraverty – mastering
- Laurie Lewis – front cover photography

2010 reissue

- Madness – producer on "Don't Look Back"
- John Sparrow – producer on the Kid Jensen session
- Mike Robinson – engineer on the Kid Jensen session
- Miti Adhikari – engineer on the Kid Jensen session
- Tim Turan – remastering
- Martin "Cally" Callomon – art direction, design
- The Stiff Art Department – original graphic design
- Nik Rose – artwork ("re-jigging and fettling")
- Virginia Turbett – photography
- Gavin Martin – liner notes

== Chart performance ==
=== Weekly charts ===
Chart (1982)	Peak position
New Zealand Albums Chart	29
German Albums Chart	15
Norwegian Albums Chart	34
Swedish Albums Chart	1
UK Albums Chart	10
Dutch LP Top 50	47

=== Year-end charts ===
Chart (1983)	Position
German Albums (Offizielle Top 100)	74

== Certifications and sales ==
Region	Certification	Certified units/sales
United Kingdom (BPI)	Gold	100,000^{^}
^{^} Shipments figures based on certification alone.

== See also ==
- List of albums released in 1982
- Madness' discography
