= Wonderful (Madness album) =

Studio album by Madness
- Released: 1 November 1999 (UK)
- Recorded: April–July 1999
- Studios: Westside Studios, London
- Genres: Ska; pop
- Length: 41:54
- Label: Virgin
- Producers: Clive Langer; Alan Winstanley

Madness chronology
Universal Madness (1999)	Wonderful (1999)	The Dangermen Sessions Vol. 1 (2005)

Singles from Wonderful
- 1. "Lovestruck" Released: 19 July 1999; 2. "Johnny the Horse" Released: October 1999; 3. "Drip Fed Fred" Released: January 2000

Wonderful is the seventh studio album by the British band Madness, released on 1 November 1999. It was the band's first studio album in eleven years since The Madness in 1988, and also the first to feature their classic seven-piece line-up since 1984's Keep Moving. The album saw Madness reunite with their original production team, Clive Langer and Alan Winstanley, who had produced all of the band's previous work.

== Background ==
After reforming in 1992 for Madstock! and a Christmas tour, Madness made several attempts to make a new record. The band first reconvened in a rehearsal studio in Camden in September 1993 for 3 months, attempting to collectively write new material. However, by now, many of the band had started families. As such, the band found it difficult putting the time aside for a new album, and abandoned the effort.

For Madstock III in June 1996, the band also rehearsed and performed several new songs, including "You’re Wonderful", "Saturday Night, Sunday Morning", "Culture Vulture", and "Soul Denying". The latter two songs would be featured on future Madness albums, although "Soul Denying" was not performed live at Madstock III.

The band reconvened again in 1997 at John Henry Studios, during which Madness played no gigs in that year. These sessions were missing Suggs and bassist Mark Bedford. Bedford had left the band temporarily to focus on his graphic design career, while Suggs was embarking on a solo career. While these sessions did produce several demos, including “The Wizard”, “Going To The Top” and “No Money”, they were also abandoned as they didn’t feature the whole band.

Eventually, in early 1999, the band finally announced they were fully reconvening to produce a new studio album. Rehearsals first took place in February at Madness’ Liquidator Studios for two months, which featured assistance from Terry Edwards and Boz Boorer on arrangements, who were acquaintances of the band. The band mainly recorded the album in April in three weeks at producers Clive Langer and Alan Whistanley’s Westside Studios. They then went to America to promote their live album Universal Madness before returning to England in May to finish mixing the album through July.

== Content ==
Even since the band's split in 1986, various band members had been writing songs. In particular, keyboardist Mike Barson, who had left the band in 1984 to live in Amsterdam, had continued writing new material on his own, such as "Going to the Top". On one hand, he had been writing with lead singer Suggs since the late 80s with the intent of a duo project, which was abandoned. However, several songs from these sessions took form on future Madness albums and Suggs' 1995 solo album The Lone Ranger, including "4am", which was re-recorded on this album.

On the other hand, Barson had also been writing new material with saxophonist Lee Thompson during this time, such as "Lovestruck" and "Drip Fed Fred". For the latter, whilst Thompson was in Amsterdam, he met up with Ian Dury, who has staying at the same hotel as him. Thompson told him about the song he and Barson wrote, initially titled "We Want Freddie", which was about the criminal underworld. He asked Dury to get involved, and he obliged, later recording the song back in England.

Other band members had also been writing new material. Secondary vocalist Cathal Smyth had written several songs for the album, including "Johnny The Horse", "The Wizard", and "You're Wonderful", which was a tribute to his late father. Drummer Daniel Woodgate had also written some songs with Thompson, such as "Elysium" and "No Money", the latter of which was also co-written by Woodgate's brother, Nick Woodgate. The only band members who didn't write any songs for the album were Mark Bedford and guitarist Chris Foreman (except co-writing B-side "Dreaming Man").

During the tracklist selection for the album, there was some conflict over two specific tracks. Smyth wanted "You're Wonderful" to be on the album, even offering to take off "The Wizard" and "Johnny The Horse" to have it included. Meanwhile, Barson wanted "Round and Round" to be on the album, which he co-wrote with Thompson. Foreman wanted both tracks to be included, but producer Clive Langer refused. And after some discussion, neither track made the album and were delegated as B-sides.

== Release ==
The album was then released in November 1999, peaking at No. 17 in the UK Albums Chart, featuring three singles. The album’s first single, “Lovestruck”, was released in July 1999 and peaked at No. 10 in the UK Singles Chart, which was the band’s first Top 10 single since “The Sun And The Rain” in 1983. This was followed by two more singles, “Johnny The Horse” (No. 44) in October, and “Drip Fed Fred” (No. 55) in January 2000.

== Reception ==
Professional ratings
Review scores
Source	Rating
Allmusic	4/5 stars
BBC News	favourable
NME	3/5 stars
Record Collector	3/5 stars

The BBC's Chris Charles said "... Wonderful finds the boys in their best form since 1981's Madness 7." Allmusic's Evan Cater gave the album 4 out of 5 stars and said "On the whole, it's a pretty successful return." In a review of the 2010 re-release, Terry Staunton of Record Collector stated that although "All the essential components are in place...something doesn’t quite gel…". Staunton thought the opening single "Lovestruck" was well done but "elsewhere there’s a niggling feeling that the band are trying too hard to replicate the sound of yore, studiously ignoring the fact that times – and the players themselves – have changed."

== Track listing ==
No.	Title	Writer(s)	Length
1.	"Lovestruck"	Lee Thompson, Mike Barson	3:50
2.	"Johnny the Horse"	Cathal Smyth	3:20
3.	"The Communicator"	Graham McPherson, Smyth	3:20
4.	"4 am"	McPherson, Barson	3:50
5.	"The Wizard"	Smyth	3:27
6.	"Drip Fed Fred" (feat. Ian Dury)	Thompson, Barson	4:30
7.	"Going to the Top"	Barson	3:56
8.	"Elysium"	Thompson, Daniel Woodgate	3:52
9.	"Saturday Night Sunday Morning"	McPherson	4:14
10.	"If I Didn't Care"	Jack Lawrence	4:25
11.	"No Money"	Thompson, D. Woodgate, Nick Woodgate	3:14
Total length:			41:54

=== 2010 reissue ===
Disc 1 - the original album
- Contains the full album plus three promo videos
The promo videos

1. "Lovestruck"
2. "Johnny the Horse"
3. "Drip Fed Fred"

Disc 2 - the bonus tracks

No.	Title	Writer(s)	Origin	Length
1.	"You're Wonderful" (remix)	Smyth	Japanese edition bonus track and B-side of "Johnny the Horse"
2.	"Round and Round"	Thompson, Barson	Japanese edition bonus track and B-side of "Lovestruck"
3.	"We Are Love"	Smyth	B-side of "Lovestruck"
4.	"Johnny the Horse" (radio edit)	Smyth	"Johnny the Horse" promo single
5.	"I Was the One"	Barson	B-side of "Johnny the Horse"
6.	"Dreaming Man"	Smyth, Chris Foreman	B-side of "Johnny the Horse"
7.	"Light of the Way"	Smyth	B-side of "Drip Fed Fred"
8.	"We Want Freddie"	Thompson, Barson	B-side of "Drip Fed Fred"
9.	"Drip Fed Fred" (The Conspiracy Mix)	Thompson, Barson	"Drip Fed Fred" single version
10.	"Maddley" (album sampler)	McPherson, Smyth, Barson, Thompson, D. Woodgate, N. Woodgate, Lawrence	B-side of "Lovestruck"
11.	"Simple Equation"	McPherson, Foreman	Our House: The Original Songs, 2002
12.	"Sarah's Song"	Thompson, Barson	Our House: The Original Songs
13.	"It Must Be Love" (2002 mix)	Labi Siffre	Our House: The Original Songs
14.	"My Old Man"	Ian Dury, Steve Nugent	Brand New Boots and Panties, 2001

== Chart performance ==
Chart (1999)	Peak position
UK Albums Chart	17

== Personnel ==
Madness

- Graham "Suggs" McPherson – lead vocals
- Mike Barson – keyboards
- Chris Foreman – guitar
- Mark Bedford – bass
- Lee Thompson – saxophones, guest vocals on track 6
- Daniel Woodgate – drums
- Cathal Smyth – backing vocals, lead vocals on track 3

Additional personnel

- Jason Bruer – saxophone
- Terry Edwards – saxophone, brass arrangements
- Michael Kearsey – trombone
- Jason McDermid – trumpet
- Pablo Cook – percussion
- The London Session Orchestra – strings
- Gavyn Wright – orchestral and strings leader
- Simon Hale – string arrangements, conductor
- Ian Dury – guest vocals on track 6
- Steve Donnelley – dobro guitar on track 5
- Mitch – backing vocals on track 4
- Sarah Cracknell – backing vocals on track 8

Technical

- Clive Langer – production
- Alan Winstanley – production
- Mark Bishop – assistant engineer
- Martin Parr – front cover photography
- Mark Bedford – design
- Robert Stimpson – design
- Dani Golfieri – design assistant
- Neil Evans – design assistant

2010 reissue

- Tim Turan – remastering
- Martin "Cally" Callomon – art direction, design
- Nik Rose – artwork ("re-jigging and fettling")
- Robert Elms – liner notes

== Notes ==
- "4 am" is a re-recorded version of the song that appeared on Suggs' solo album The Lone Ranger in 1995.
- "If I Didn't Care" is a cover of a song originally recorded by the Ink Spots.
- Providing the vocals to "Drip Fed Fred" would be Ian Dury's last chart single release and final TV appearance on The National Lottery Show before his death in March 2000.
- Despite being the title of the album, "You're Wonderful" only made it as a b-side on one of the editions of the "Johnny the Horse" single. However, it is included on the Japanese version of the album, along with another song which was a b-side in the UK: "Round and Round".
