= Mad Not Mad =

Studio album by Madness
- Released: 30 September 1985
- Recorded: March–April 1985
- Studios: Westside Studios (London); AIR Studios (London)
- Genres: Pop; new wave; two-tone
- Length: 42:19
- Labels: Zarjazz (UK); Geffen (US)
- Producers: Clive Langer; Alan Winstanley

Madness chronology
Keep Moving (1984)	Mad Not Mad (1985)	The Madness (1988)

Singles from Mad Not Mad
- 1. "Yesterday's Men" Released: 19 August 1985; 2. "Uncle Sam" Released: 14 October 1985; 3. "Sweetest Girl" Released: 10 February 1986

Mad Not Mad is the sixth studio album by the English ska and pop band Madness. It was released on 30 September 1985, their first release on their own label Zarjazz, a sub-label of Virgin Records. The album was recorded over a span of two months in 1985 at Westside Studios and at AIR Studios, both in London. The album was their last recording of original material until they officially reformed in 1992.

The album peaked at No. 16 on the UK Albums Chart, and achieved silver status from the British Phonographic Industry (BPI). However, Mad Not Mad remains the band's poorest-selling studio album.

Upon its release, the album was received favourably by the majority of music critics, although opinions have become slightly more negative in subsequent decades. After only a few weeks of its initial release, the writers of NME listed this album at number 55 on their list of the "100 Best Albums of All Time". The NME's view of the album is still favourable, including it in its 2015 list of "50 Albums Released in 1985 That Still Sound Great Today".

The band themselves have been quite vocal that they were less satisfied with the album. In a BBC Radio 1 interview in 1993, their lead vocalist Suggs described Mad Not Mad as "a polished turd", referring to its distinctively glossy mid-1980s production by Clive Langer and Alan Winstanley, who had both produced all of Madness' work since the band's first studio album, One Step Beyond... (1979). In a 2009 interview, Suggs said that with keyboardist Mike Barson gone they "slightly over-compensated, arrangement-wise and musician-wise", but there were "some great songs on that album, for sure".

However, Barson himself has said that he liked the album, with the title track "Mad Not Mad" being his favourite. He retroactively stated, "I felt like 'They've cracked it, they can do it. They don't need me'. I thought it sounded as good as anything we'd done, but they didn't seem to."

== Content ==
Over the course of the album, the band both express their feelings and private problems, and address political issues. They touch on politics on "Burning the Boats", but also on a maturing disenchantment with the youth culture on "Yesterday's Men". It also features the satirical track "I'll Compete" which acknowledges their declining popularity and sales with the lyrics "Let us hurry now, time is catching up", and also exaggerates on them maturing with the line "I'm five years closer to my pension scheme".

Mad Not Mad features prolific guest backing vocalists, including the female trio Afrodiziak, and Jimmy Helms. The album is notably the band's only studio album not to feature their keyboardist and founding member Mike Barson, who had left the group the previous year to spend more time in Amsterdam, Holland, with his then-wife Sandra. Barson's keyboard parts were filled by synthesizers, and the album features session musicians Steve Nieve (keyboards) and Roy Davies (piano). After the album, Madness disbanded in 1986, but Barson did join them for the recording of their one-off single "(Waiting For) The Ghost Train".

The album featured the songs "Yesterday's Men", "Uncle Sam", and "Sweetest Girl" which were all released as singles, with corresponding music videos. The three singles that were released all reached the Top 40 on the UK singles chart, however the latter two failed to make the Top 20, which was a first for any Madness single. The aforementioned "Sweetest Girl" was a cover version of a song by the British band Scritti Politti. In 1993, guitarist Chris Foreman revealed that the band had preferred to release "I'll Compete" as a single instead of "Sweetest Girl".

Back inlay of Mad Not Mad album. From left to right: Cathal Smyth (vocals), Lee Thompson (saxophone), Daniel Woodgate (drums), Mark Bedford (bass), Chris Foreman (guitar) and Suggs (vocals)

== Release ==
Mad Not Mad was met with a mediocre reception, especially on adult contemporary radio, being criticised for its reliance on slow, dark and downbeat songs. The album was preceded by the song "Yesterday's Men" as the first single, reaching No. 18 in the UK. The album itself was released weeks later, only going to No. 16 in the UK, though it still went silver there. The track "Uncle Sam", released in October 1985, peaked at No. 21 in the UK (in a disappointing chart performance considering the lead singles from their prior albums were Top 20 hits in the UK). The third and final single, "Sweetest Girl", only peaked at No. 35 in the UK.

== Critical reception ==
Professional ratings
Review scores
Source	Rating
AllMusic	2.5/5 stars
Record Collector	3/5 stars
Record Mirror	4/5 stars
(The New) Rolling Stone Album Guide	2/5 stars
Smash Hits	7/10

In a retrospective review for AllMusic, critic Darryl Cater wrote of the album "Clive Langer and Alan Wistanley occasionally strike an inspired balance between soulful pop and subtle reggae rhythms, but more often they replace the warmth of Barson's pianos with a cold emphasis on drum machines and synthesizers. Some of the songwriting, however, is on par with the band's most mature work, and the lively melodies lend a perfect irony to the band's wry social commentary and personal brooding." Reviewing for Record Collector, critic Terry Staunton wrote of the album "The Nutty Boys were veering towards an altogether gloomier form of nuttiness when this album first appeared in 1985. The wacky humour of old, already on the wane in their previous outing, Keep Moving, was almost totally eclipsed by sombre tones of resignation, best exemplified on the single Yesterday's Men." (The New) Rolling Stone Album Guide wrote that the album "finds the lads sinking into [an] unseemly self-reflection".

== Reissue ==
The album was re-released in the United Kingdom in October 2010 by Virgin Records featuring rare bonus content. The reissue was a 3-disc set which comprises a 14-track CD with the original album digitally remastered from the 1/2" mix tapes; alongside three bonus single remixes and '(Waiting For) The Ghost Train'; a bonus 10-track CD including demos of all the album's singles and their respective B-sides; plus a bonus DVD containing all the music videos for the singles as well as live performances from five BBC TV shows. It also features liner notes written by comedian and Madness fan, Phill Jupitus.

== Track listing ==
Side one
No.	Title	Writer(s)	Length
1.	"I'll Compete"	Daniel Woodgate; Lee Thompson	3:21
2.	"Yesterday's Men"	Chris Foreman; Graham McPherson	4:37
3.	"Uncle Sam"	Foreman; Thompson	4:16
4.	"White Heat"	Cathal Smyth; McPherson	3:47
5.	"Mad Not Mad"	Smyth; McPherson	4:10

Side two
No.	Title	Writer(s)	Length
6.	"Sweetest Girl"	Green Gartside	5:47
7.	"Burning the Boats"	Foreman; McPherson	4:31
8.	"Tears You Can't Hide"	Smyth	3:08
9.	"Time"	Smyth	4:18
10.	"Coldest Day"	Foreman; Clive Langer; McPherson	4:24
Total length:			42:19

=== 2010 reissue ===
CD 1

The original album
No.	Title	Writer(s)	Length
1.	"I'll Compete"	Woodgate; Thompson	3:21
2.	"Yesterday's Men"	Foreman; McPherson	4:37
3.	"Uncle Sam"	Foreman; Thompson	4:16
4.	"White Heat"	Smyth; McPherson	3:47
5.	"Mad Not Mad"	Smyth; McPherson	4:10
6.	"Sweetest Girl"	Gartside	5:47
7.	"Burning the Boats"	Foreman; McPherson	4:31
8.	"Tears You Can't Hide"	Smyth	3:08
9.	"Time"	Smyth	4:18
10.	"Coldest Day"	Foreman; Langer; McPherson	4:24

The bonus tracks
No.	Title	Writer(s)	Length
11.	"Yesterday's Men" (Extended Version) (from "Yesterday's Men" 12" single)	Foreman; McPherson	8:11
12.	"Uncle Sam" (Ray Gun Mix) (from "Uncle Sam" 12" single)	Foreman; Thompson	6:46
13.	"Sweetest Girl" (Extended Mix) (from "Sweetest Girl" 12" single)	Gartside	5:46
14.	"(Waiting For) The Ghost Train" (Non-album single, 1986)	McPherson	3:45
Total length:			66:54

Note

- "Sweetest Girl" (Extended Mix) is meant to be the extended mix from the "Sweetest Girl" 12" single but is actually the album version repeated instead.

CD 2

B-sides
No.	Title	Writer(s)	Length
1.	"Yesterday's Men" (demo version) (from "Yesterday's Men" 12" single)	Foreman; McPherson	3:38
2.	"All I Knew" (from "Yesterday's Men" single)	McPherson	3:09
3.	"Yesterday's Men" (harmonica version) (from "Yesterday's Men" picture disc and extra disc single)	Foreman; McPherson	4:32
4.	"Uncle Sam" (demo version) (from "Uncle Sam" 12" single)	Foreman; Thompson	4:27
5.	"Please Don't Go" (from "Uncle Sam" single)	Foreman	3:20
6.	"Inanity Over Christmas" (Non-album flexi disc single, 1984)	Woodgate; Thompson	3:53
7.	"Sweetest Girl" (Dub Mix) (from "Sweetest Girl" 12" single)	Gartside	7:10
8.	"Jennie (A Portrait of)"	Woodgate; Thompson	3:01
9.	"Call Me" (from "Sweetest Girl" limited edition extra disc single)	Smyth; McPherson	3:59
10.	"Maybe in Another Life" (from "(Waiting For) The Ghost Train" single)	Thompson; Woodgate; Mark Bedford; Neal	3:02
Total length:			40:12

DVD
The promo videos "Yesterday's Men "Uncle Sam "Sweetest Girl" "(Waiting for) The Ghost Train" Wogan - 19/08/85 "Yesterday's Men" Top of the Pops - 21/11/85 "Uncle Sam" Whistle Test - 26/11/85 "Burning the Boats" "Time" Hammersmith Odeon - 31/12/85 "Yesterday's Men" "Uncle Sam" "Time" "I'll Compete" Top of the Pops - 13/11/86 "(Waiting For The) Ghost Train"

== Personnel ==
Madness

- Graham "Suggs" McPherson – lead vocals
- Chris Foreman – guitars
- Mark Bedford – bass guitars
- Lee Thompson – saxophones
- Daniel Woodgate – drums, LinnDrum programming; keyboard sequences
- Cathal Smyth – backing vocals; lead vocals on "Tears You Can't Hide"

Additional musicians

- Steve Nieve – keyboards
- Roy Davies – piano
- Judd Lander – harmonica
- Luís Jardim – percussion
- Tom Morley – computer supervision
- Gary Barnacle – saxophones
- Afrodiziak (Caron Wheeler, Claudia Fontaine and Naomi Thompson) – backing Vocals
- Jimmy Helms – backing vocals
- Jimmy Thomas – backing vocals
- Jimmy Chambers – backing vocals
- David Bedford – strings and MD
- Trevor Ford – strings
- Rupert Bowden – strings
- Bill Benham – strings
- Belinda Blunt – strings
- Rusen Gunes – strings
- Adan Levine – strings
- Basil Smart – strings

Technical

- Clive Langer – producer
- Alan Winstanley – producer
- Matt Howe – associate producer
- Mark Saunders – associate producer
- Richard Sullivan – associate producer
- Anton Corbijn – cover photograph
- Clare Müller – studio photographs
- John Stoddard – inner photograph
- Ian Wright – sleeve illustration
- Simon Halfon – sleeve design

2010 reissue personnel

- Lee Thompson – lead vocals on "Uncle Sam" (demo version) and "Maybe in Another Life"
- Mike Barson – keyboards on "(Waiting For) The Ghost Train"
- Jerry Dammers – keyboards on "All I Knew"
- Liquidator Productions (i.e. Madness) – producer on "Yesterday's Men" (demo version), "All I Knew", "Please Don't Go", "Uncle Sam" (demo version), "Jennie (A Portrait of)", "Maybe in Another Life" and "Call Me"
- Ian Horne – engineer on "Yesterday's Men" (demo version), "All I Knew", "Please Don't Go", "Uncle Sam" (demo version) and "Maybe in Another Life"
- Mark Saunders – engineer on "Maybe in Another Life"
- Tim Debney – remastering
- Ray Shulman – DVD authoring
- Jason Day – project manager, compilling
- Chris Peyton – reissue design
- Phill Jupitus – liner notes

== Charts ==
Chart (1985)	Peak position
Swedish Albums (Sverigetopplistan)	42
UK Albums (Official Charts)	16

== Certifications and sales ==
Region	Certification	Certified units/sales
United Kingdom (BPI)	Silver	60,000^{^}
^{^} Shipments figures based on certification alone.

== See also ==
- List of albums released in 1985
- Madness' discography
