= Ten More Turnips from the Tip =

Studio album by Ian Dury & the Blockheads
- Released: 2002
- Recorded: 1991, 1996, 1999, 2001
- Studios: Sonet Studio; AIR Studios; RAK Studios; Helicon Mountain Studios; Mute Studios
- Genre: Rock
- Length: 48:53
- Labels: East Central One; Ronnie Harris
- Producers: Blockheads; Laurie Latham

Ian Dury & the Blockheads chronology
Straight from the Desk (2001)	Ten More Turnips from the Tip (2002)

Singles from Ten More Turnips from the Tip
- 1. "Dance Little Rude Boy" Released: 2002; 2. "One Love" Released: 2002

Ten More Turnips from the Tip is the fourth and final studio album by Ian Dury and the Blockheads, and Dury's ninth overall. It was compiled and released in 2002, two years after Dury's death in March 2000.

== Background ==
The album came to be after Ian Dury's second wife Sophy found a list of songs under the title 'Ten More Turnips from the Tip' among her husband's papers. The list, described as 'almost like a will' by Blockheads keyboardist Mick Gallagher in Ian Dury & The Blockheads: Song By Song, included four tracks recorded at RAK Studios in October 1999 amidst other titles that presumably included some that were not recorded. Sophy gave this list to Chaz Jankel and gave her approval for the Blockheads to finish the album. However, it is unlikely the final album corresponds to this list as the Blockheads were only allowed limited access to Dury's songs by his estate and many of the songs were revamped tracks from the early 1990s with additional overdubs by the Blockheads. "Dance Little Rude Boy" would have definitely been on the list though as it was one of the songs recorded at RAK (it would later be released as a single).

An initially sceptical Laurie Latham was brought in to produce the album's assembly. Latham had worked on a good number of Ian Dury's albums, including all of his Stiff Records work. Although Latham disliked albums of out-takes and demos put together after the artist's death (a common occurrence in the music business) he was eventually won over by the quality of the songs. Latham is responsible for a number of small edits to the songs, for instance, he swapped the beginning for the ending on "Cowboys" and added the small sound bite of Dury sipping tea on "The Ballad of the Sulphate Strangler".

Two songs were written by Dury so late in his life that he was too ill to even record guide vocals for them. "I Could Lie" was the last Ian Dury & the Blockheads song written and as Dury was weak from his illness, Jankel recorded both the demo version and final version. Jankel would also have performed lead vocals on "You're the Why", but when it was played at Dury's funeral Robbie Williams offered to sing it if it were ever recorded. In contrast "I Believe", "Cowboys" and "One Love" date back to the recording sessions at Sonet Studios for The Bus Driver's Prayer & Other Stories in 1991.

Dury's brother-in-law Jake Tilson designed the album's sleeve and booklet. Fans contributed a number of the items and tickets pictured within it amongst various paintings, including one by Ian Dury himself (of Chaz Jankel), Ian by Peter Blake and Lady & Beast Adorned by Terry Day. Jock Scot, Sophy Dury and Humphrey Ocean (a former member of Kilburn and the High Roads, Dury's pub rock band in the mid-1970s) were responsible for other pieces while the front featured a photograph of Dury as a child, in a pram being pushed by his father William Dury, with their dog Bella.

Following a surprising lack of record company interest, negotiations with lawyers and Dury's accountant Ronnie Harris delayed the release of the album by six months but it was greeted by warm reviews and tracks from the album remain in the Blockheads live sets to this day.

== Track listing ==
All tracks are written by Ian Dury and Chaz Jankel, except where noted.

No.	Title	Writer(s)	Length
1.	"Dance Little Rude Boy"		4:34
2.	"I Believe"	Dury, Mick Gallagher	4:24
3.	"It Ain't Cool"	Dury, Merlin Rhys-Jones	5:46
4.	"Cowboys"		4:41
5.	"Ballad of the Sulphate Strangler"	Dury, Jankel, Norman Watt-Roy	5:59
6.	"I Could Lie"		4:35
7.	"One Love"		3:33
8.	"Happy Hippy"	Dury, Rhys-Jones	4:43
9.	"Books and Water" (includes "Ian's Poem")	Jock Scot ("Ian's Poem")	6:36
10.	"You're the Why"		4:30

== Personnel ==
=== Musicians ===
- Ian Dury – vocals
- Chaz Jankel – guitar, keyboards, vocals on "I Could Lie"
- Mickey Gallagher – keyboards
- Johnny Turnbull – guitars, banjo on "Cowboys"
- Norman Watt-Roy – bass
- Dylan Howe – drums
- Gilad Atzmon – saxophones
- The Breezeblocks – backing vocals

=== Additional musicians ===
- Robbie Williams – vocals on "You're the Why"
- Jock Scot – recitation on "Ian's Poem"
- Steve Monti – drums on "Ballad of the Sulphate Strangler" and "Happy Hippy"
- Davey Payne – saxophones and flute on "Ballad of the Sulphate Strangler" and "Happy Hippy"

=== Technical ===
- Blockheads – producer
- Laurie Latham – producer, engineer, mixing
- John Bailey – engineer
- Kevin Paul – engineer
- Rupert Coulson – engineer
- Jake Tilson – design
- Jill Furmanovsky – photography
- Barney Bubbles – design ("Hankie Pantie")
- Gordon House – print ("Ian")
- Peter Blake – watercolour and collage ("Ian")
- Sophy Dury – cover, case and CD
- Ian Dury – drawing ("Chaz")
- Humphrey Ocean – drawing ("Ian"), painting ("Ian")
- Geoffrey Rigden – painting ("Disco-o")
- Terry Day – painting ("Lady & Beast Adorned")

== Recording information ==
- 2, 4 and 7 – recorded at Sonet Studio, London; over-dubbed and mixed at Helicon Mountain Studios, Westcombe Park (1991)
- 5 and 8 – recorded at AIR Studios, London; over-dubbed at Mute Studios, London; mixed at Helicon Mountain Studios (1996)
- 1, 3 and 9 – recorded at RAK Studios, London; mixed at AIR Studios (1999)
- 6 and 10 – recorded and mixed at Helicon Mountain Studios (2001)

== Further details ==
- The album was organised by Dury's wife Sophy, daughter Jemima, son Baxter, the Blockheads and Jamie Spencer.
- After "Books and Water" is a eulogy by Scottish poet Jock Scot, who worked as warm-up man for both Dury and the Clash. The lyrics are printed in the album's booklet under the title "Ian's Poem".
- "Ballad of the Sulphate Strangler" is a tribute to one of Dury's old minders, Pete Rush. Dury had wanted to keep the song unreleased to spare the feelings of Rush's mother Marge (mentioned in the song). Marge Rush died in the early 1990s and the Blockheads felt able to release it in 2001.

== Sources ==
- Ian Dury & The Blockheads: Song By Song by Jim Drury, first published 2003, Sanctuary Publishing.
