= Ian Wright (illustrator) =

British illustrator

- Born: 1953 (age 72–73); England
- Education: Goldsmiths College in London
- Occupation: Illustrator

Ian Wright is a British illustrator.

== Education and career ==
Born in England in 1953, Wright studied at Goldsmiths College in London (1974–1975) and received a bachelor's degree in graphic design from the London College of Printing in 1978. Following his degree studies, he became an assistant to George Hardie (1978–1979) and then shared a studio with designer Neville Brody at The Face magazine (1979–1981, 1990–1996). In 1981, he set up his own studio.

Wright's work as a commercial illustrator has spanned four decades, starting with his illustrative cover of The Undertones' "Get Over You" 7-inch single in the late 1970s, progressing with his illustrative artwork for The Face in its 1980s heyday and his weekly black-and-white portraits for the New Musical Express. His subsequent work has included projects for a multitude of diverse individuals, including Issey Miyake, Givenchy, Mike Tyson, Björk, Ian Brown, Pete Townshend, Tony Bennett, T.I., and the cover illustration for Madness' sixth album, Mad Not Mad.

In his illustrative work, Wright has experimented with a variety of techniques. An early portrait of Grandmaster Flash was made entirely with salt to replicate cocaine as a reference to the seminal rap track "White Lines". He adopted photocopiers at an early stage, changing single-colour toners within the machine to mimic the screen print process by building layers of colour from separate artworks into one final image. In his portraits and illustrative artwork for record sleeves and the music press, he combines analogue and digital techniques.

Wright's artwork has been exhibited internationally, including in London at the Design Museum (2007), the Exposure Gallery (2007), the Cosh Gallery (2007), Rosemary Gardens (2005), and the Pentagram Gallery (2005); in New York at the Reed Space (2006), Times Square (2006), Mass Production at The Christopher Henry Gallery (2006), and Issey Miyake (2002); in Hong Kong at Agnes B Librairie Gallery (2007) and the Hong Kong Center Wanchai (2005); and in the Czech Republic at the 22nd International Biennale of Graphic Design (2006).
