= Johnny the Horse =

1999 single by Madness

Single by Madness

from the album Wonderful
- Released: October 1999
- Genre: Pop
- Length: 3:19
- Label: Virgin
- Songwriter: Carl Smyth
- Producers: Clive Langer, Alan Winstanley

Madness singles chronology
"Lovestruck" (1999)	"Johnny the Horse" (1999)	"Drip Fed Fred" (2000)

"Johnny the Horse" is a single by British band Madness from their 1999 album Wonderful. The song struggled to make an impact in the charts after the success of "Lovestruck", and peaked at No. 44 on the UK Singles Chart.

== Content ==
Carl Smyth explained that "The song Johnny the Horse was inspired by a couple of tramps who I used to see often sitting and drinking cheap booze on a wall locally. One day one of them was crying and, after asking him what was the problem, he told me that his friend had been beaten and killed whilst trying to sleep in an empty building. The name is the kind of tag that Scots or Irish might give to a strong drinking hard man type." Another quote states that "...it's funny how people's lives can unravel y'know. So that's what it's about. Who remembers them, they've had a life and then sort of fall between the cracks."

The day before the video was filmed, after the band's performance for Virgin Radio in the Battersea Power Station on October 23rd, saxophonist Lee Thompson and Carl got into a fist fight with each other. Thus, in the music video, Lee is notably nursing a black eye.

Although bonus track "You're Wonderful" is listed as a remix, this is the only version of the song to be released.

There is also a radio edit of the single, where the line "Johnny the Horse was kicked to death, he died for entertainment" is replaced by the line "Johnny the Horse, who passed this way, he died for entertainment ". This radio edit also appeared on the 2010 reissue of Wonderful.

== Track listings ==
Two versions of the single were released on CD.

CD1

1. "Johnny the Horse" (Smyth) - 3:19
2. "You're Wonderful" (remix) (Smyth) - 3:40
3. "Johnny the Horse" (enhanced video)

CD2

1. "Johnny the Horse" (Smyth) - 3:19
2. "I Was the One" (Barson) - 3:07
3. "Dreaming Man" (Smyth/Foreman) - 3:07

=== Record Store Day reissue ===
The song was reissued on 7" vinyl for Record Store Day 2017, as a double A-side with "Drip Fed Fred".

7" vinyl

1. "Drip Fed Fred" (album version) (Thompson/Barson) - 4:30
2. "Johnny the Horse" (radio edit) (Smyth) - 3:19

== Charts ==
Chart (1999)	Peak position
UK Singles (OCC)	44
