= Madness (Is All in the Mind) =

Song by Madness

Single by Madness

from the album The Rise & Fall
- A-side: "Tomorrow's (Just Another Day)"
- Released: 1 February 1983
- Recorded: 1982
- Studio: AIR (London, UK)
- Genre: Ska, pop, new wave, jazz fusion
- Length: 3:10
- Label: Stiff Records
- Songwriter(s): Chris Foreman
- Producer(s): Clive Langer; Alan Winstanley

Madness singles chronology
"Our House" (1982)	"Tomorrow's (Just Another Day)" / "Madness (Is All in the Mind)" (1983)	"Wings of a Dove" (1983)

Madness (Is All in the Mind) is a song by British band Madness from their fourth album The Rise & Fall. It spent 9 weeks in the UK charts, peaking at number eight in February 1983. It was released as a double A-side with "Tomorrow's (Just Another Day)", with the latter being the side which got most airplay. Unlike most Madness songs this features Chas Smash on lead vocals. It should not be confused with "Madness", the Prince Buster song previously covered by the group.

== Charts ==
Chart (1983)	Peak position
UK Singles Chart	8
