= Pathway Studios =

8-track studio in North London

Coordinates: 51.549°N 0.091°W

Pathway Studios was an independent recording studio in North London. Founded in 1970, the studio became an early favourite of Stiff Records' Dave Robinson and Jake Riviera, and was the location for early recordings by The Damned, The Count Bishops, Madness, Elvis Costello, Squeeze, Lene Lovich, John Foxx, and the Police.

== History ==
The 8-track studio, located at 2a Grosvenor Avenue in the North London Borough of Islington, was founded by producers Peter Ker and Mike Finesilver, who funded the majority of the construction with their co-writing royalties from the hit song, "Fire". Pathway had a single 25 foot x 25 foot studio with a very small control room.

Mark Bedford of Madness recalls that "It was a really thin building – you couldn't really call it a house – on Grosvenor Avenue, close to Stoke Newington. The studio and control room were on the ground floor, then these rickety old stairs led to the office up top. The studio had that old-fashioned aerated board with the holes on the walls, so it was very fifties." Lee Thompson of Madness recalls that "It was just down a cobbled back alley. Unassuming, nothing flash, nothing big; just an oversized garage with a couple of speakers and soundproofed rooms. It was very rough and ready."

Working at Pathway as Stiff Records' in-house producer beginning in 1976, Nick Lowe produced such notable recordings as The Damned's debut single "New Rose", the first UK punk rock band single, released in October of that year, as well as their follow-up debut studio album, Damned Damned Damned. Other artists who made early recordings with Lowe at Pathway Studios included Madness, Elvis Costello, Squeeze, The Count Bishops with Mike Spenser, The Cheap Things, The Cannibals and John Foxx.

On 12 February 1977, just a couple of weeks before the band's debut live performance, the Police recorded their debut single, "Fall Out" at Pathway with a budget of £150. In July of the same year, Dire Straits recorded the demo of "Sultans of Swing", with the song's subsequent popularity leading to the band signing a recording contract with Phonogram Records two months later. Also in 1977, Sham 69 recorded their first single "I Don't Wanna", produced by John Cale.

John Cleese used Pathway to record voiceovers for his business training films, and in 1981 the studio was featured in the Madness drama-documentary Take It or Leave It.

Pathway Studios closed in the early 2000s, with the building later converted into two small apartments.

== Notable recordings ==
=== Singles ===
- The Damned: “New Rose” (1976)
- Sham 69: "I Don't Wanna" (produced by John Cale) (1977)
- Dire Straits: "Sultans of Swing" (demo) (1977)
- The Police: "Fall Out" (1977)
- Menace: "Screwed Up / Insane Society" (produced by Kim Turner) (1977)
- Menace: "I Need Nothing / Electrocutioner" (produced by John Cale) (1977)
- The Flys: "Love and a Molotov Cocktail" (1977)
- Siouxsie and the Banshees: "Nicotine Stain" (demo) (1977?)
- Lene Lovich: "Lucky Number" (1978)
- Madness: "The Prince" (1979)
- Ewan MacColl: "Dirty Old Town" (1983)

=== Albums ===
- Elvis Costello: My Aim Is True (1977)
- The Damned: Damned Damned Damned (1977)
- Dave Edmunds: Get It (1977)
- Nick Lowe: Jesus of Cool (1978)
- The Motors: Approved by the Motors (1978)
- Squeeze: Squeeze (1978)
- John Foxx: Metamatic (1980)
- Anne Clark: The Sitting Room (1982)
- Link Wray: Apache (1990)

=== Film ===
- Madness: Take It or Leave It
