= Yesterday's Men =

1985 single by Madness

Single by Madness

from the album Mad Not Mad
- B-side: "All I Knew"; "It Must Be Love" (live)
- Released: 19 August 1985
- Genre: Bossa nova
- Length: 4:07
- Label: Zarjazz
- Composer: Chris Foreman
- Lyricist: Graham McPherson
- Producers: Clive Langer; Alan Winstanley

Madness singles chronology
"One Better Day" (1984)	"Yesterday's Men" (1985)	"Uncle Sam" (1985)

Music video
- "Yesterday's Men" on YouTube

"Yesterday's Men" (wrongly listed as "Yesterday's Man" on the label of the European release on Virgin 107 584) is a song by the English ska and pop band Madness, released on 19 August 1985 by Zarjazz as the lead single from their sixth studio album Mad Not Mad (1985). It was written by Graham McPherson and Chris Foreman, and produced by Clive Langer and Alan Winstanley. The song spent 7 weeks on the UK singles chart, peaking at number 18. The song was edited for release as a single, the album version being some thirty seconds longer. A music video was filmed to promote the single, directed by Chris Gabrin.

== Critical reception ==
Upon its release as a single, Paul Bursche of Number One described "Yesterday's Men" as "a grim portrait of a land without hope" and "a real grower that finally emerges into one of the best songs the group have ever done". He added that although it was "very Sade-ish", "even the orchestration can't disguise a new lush Madness sound". Ian Cranna of Smash Hits wrote, This mournful little exhortation to hang on in there with gentle percussion and varied instrumental weaving must be quite satisfying to record after being so nutty for so long, but it's hardly soul-stirring stuff." Paolo Hewitt of NME felt the song was "cast in a similar mould" to the band's previous single "One Better Day" and noted that Madness "have never sounded so wistful and yet so relaxed as this song of optimism and smashed dreams". He praised Suggs' vocals for "fast becoming the vehicle to carry off such sentiments" and noted the song's "lilting and haunting refrain". He concluded it was "assured, classy and irresistible music".

The song was ranked number 7 among the "Tracks of the Year" for 1985 by NME. In a retrospective review of Mad Not Mad, Darryl Cater of AllMusic described the song as "dwell[ing] on themes of transience and aging". Terry Staunton of Record Collector noted, "The wacky humour of old, already on the wane in their previous outing, Keep Moving, was almost totally eclipsed by sombre tones of resignation, best exemplified on 'Yesterday's Men'."

== Track listing ==
- 7" single
1. "Yesterday's Men" – 4:07
2. "All I Knew" – 3:07
- 12" single
1. "Yesterday's Men" (Extended Version) – 8:05
2. "All I Knew" – 3:07
3. "Yesterday's Men" (Demo Version) – 3:33
- 7" 'Picture disc and extra disc
1. "Yesterday's Men" – 4:07
2. "All I Knew" – 3:07
3. "Yesterday's Men" (Harmonica Version) – 4:37
4. "It Must Be Love" (live) – 3:35

== Charts ==
Chart (1985)	Peak position
UK Singles (OCC)	18
