= Dance Little Rude Boy =

Single by Ian Dury and the Blockheads

from the album Ten More Turnips from the Tip
- B-side: "It Ain't Cool"
- Released: 2002 (UK)
- Recorded: 1999
- Studio: RAK (London)
- Genre: Pop rock; funk rock
- Length: 4:34
- Label: East Central One; Ronnie Harris
- Songwriters: Ian Dury; Chaz Jankel
- Producer: Laurie Latham

Ian Dury singles chronology
| "Drip Fed Fred" (with Madness, 2000) | "Dance Little Rude Boy" (2002) | "One Love" (2002) |

Official Audio
- "Dance Little Rude Boy" on YouTube

Dance Little Rude Boy is the penultimate single to be released, as a promo, by the English rock band Ian Dury and the Blockheads.Written by Ian Dury and Chaz Jankel the song was recorded at RAK Studios when Dury was still able to perform. It was released in 2002, after Dury's death, on East Central One / Ronnie Harris Records.

The song was one of two singles taken from the 2002 album Ten More Turnips from the Tip, the other being "One Love" / "Ballad of the Sulphate Strangler".

The B-side of the single included two songs: "Books and Water" and "It Ain't Cool".

== Reception ==
Reviewing the album for the BBC in 2002, Chris Jones said:

The title seems to imply some kind of rejected product is on offer here. How far this is from the truth is immediately made plain from the sophisticated stroking of a Fender Rhodes that opens the first track "Dance Little Rude Boy". [...] The aforementioned "Rude Boy", "Books and Water" and "It Ain't Cool" all bounce with robust good health with Dury's razor-sharp lyrics cutting a swathe through the smoothest jazz-funk this side of the Atlantic.

Writing in The Guardian in 2008, British comedian Phill Jupitus recalled seeing Dury's last gig: "I compered Ian Dury’s last ever gig at the London Palladium in 2000, which was such a sad night. After the gig he sent me this: lyrics to "Dance Little Rude Boy". He had such a good attitude: he said that he didn't have cancer, cancer had him, and would have to deal with him."

== Personnel ==
- Ian Dury – vocals
- Chaz Jankel – guitar, keyboards
- Mickey Gallagher – keyboards
- Johnny Turnbull – guitars
- Norman Watt-Roy – bass
- Dylan Howe – drums
- Gilad Atzmon – saxophones
