= Joe Tilson =

British artist (1928–2023)

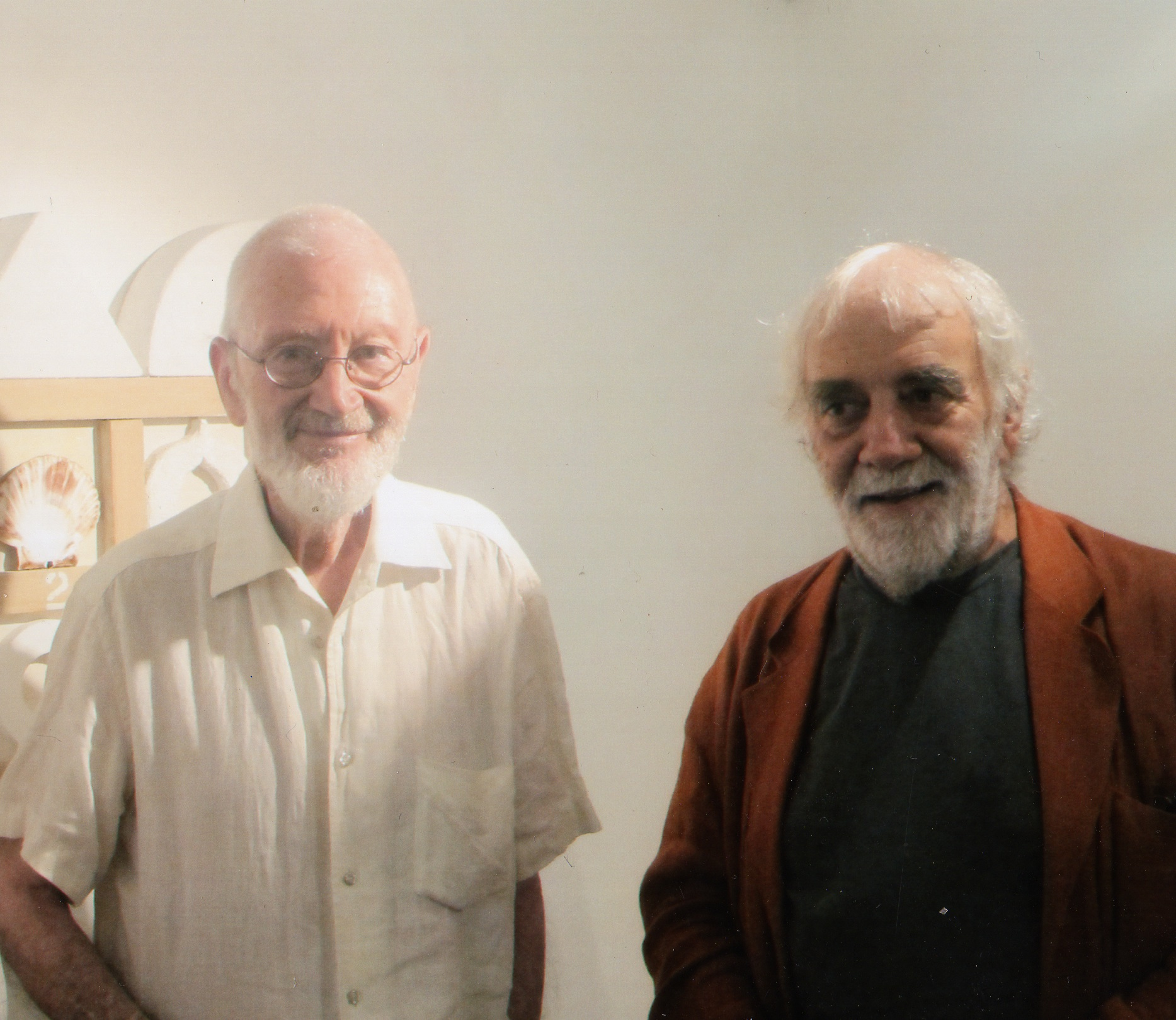
Tilson (left) and Enzo Di Martino in 2014

Joseph Charles Tilson RA (24 August 1928, London – 9 November 2023, Cortona) was a British visual artist and fellow of the Royal Academy. He was involved in the Pop Art movement in the 1960s; he made paintings, prints and constructions.

== Early life and education ==
Tilson was born in London on 24 August 1928. He was in the Royal Air Force from 1946 to 1949. He studied at Saint Martin's School of Art from 1949 until 1952, and then at the Royal College of Art until 1955. In that year he received a Rome Prize to the British School at Rome, and went to Italy for two years. A still life from this period was included as one of the 'Young Artists of Promise' in Jack Beddington's book. He returned to London in 1957, and from 1958 to 1963 he taught at Central Saint Martin's, and subsequently taught at the Slade School of Fine Art, University College London, The School of Visual Arts in New York City and the Hochschule für Bildende Künste, Hamburg. In 1964 he exhibited at the 32nd Venice Biennale.

== Career ==
During the 1960s Tilson became one of the leading figures associated with the British Pop Art movement. Making use of his previous experience as a carpenter and joiner, Tilson produced wooden reliefs and constructions as well as prints and paintings. As a student at the RCA Tilson associated with Frank Auerbach, Leon Kossoff, R. B. Kitaj, Peter Blake, Allen Jones, Patrick Caulfield and David Hockney, among others.

His first one-man show was held at the Marlborough Gallery, London in 1962. In 1977 he joined the Waddington Galleries, and also exhibited at the Alan Cristea Gallery and the Giò Marconi Galleries in Milan. Tilson's work gained an international reputation when shown at the XXXII Venice Biennale in 1964, which led to a retrospective at the Boyman's Museum, Rotterdam in 1964. Further retrospective exhibitions followed at the Vancouver Art Gallery in 1979 and the Arnolfini Gallery, Bristol in 1984.

Growing disillusionment with the consumer society led to a change in Tilson work in the 1970s. After moving to Wiltshire in 1972, Tilson began to use a wider variety of materials, including stone, straw and rope in an effort to transcend time and culture by drawing on the motifs of pre-Classical mythology. This body of work is called Alchera.

Tilson's work was exhibited regularly in solo shows throughout the world: Cortona Centro Culturale Fontanella Borghese, Rome (1990), Plymouth City Museum (1991), Palazzo Pubblico, Siena (1995), Mestna Gallery, Ljubljana (1996) and Galleria Comunale d'Arte, Cesena (2000). In 2002, a major retrospective was held at the Royal Academy of Arts, London. Among Tilson's awards were the Gulbenkian Foundation Prize (1960) and the Grand Prix d'Honneur, Biennale of Ljubljana (1996). He was a Royal Academician and his career was celebrated with a retrospective exhibition in 2002 at the Royal Academy 'Joe Tilson: Pop to Present' (Sackler Galleries) from April 2002. He was also invited to paint the banner for the "Palio", Siena in 1996. In 2019, he was commissioned make an installation for the Swatch Pavilion at the Venice Biennial inspired by his 'Stones of Venice' works. He also designed a limited-edition watch as part of the project.

Tilson was elected an Associate of the Royal Academy (ARA) in 1985 and a full Royal Academician (RA) in 1991.

== Personal life and death ==
Tilson lived and worked in both London and Italy. He was married in Venice in 1956 to Joslyn Morton (b. 1934), and had three children: Jake (b. 1958), Anna (b. 1959), and Sophy (b. 1965).

Joe Tilson died on 9 November 2023 at Cortona, at the age of 95.

== Exhibitions ==
Tilson's solo exhibitions include:

- Marlborough Fine Art, London. Joe Tilson at 90
- Alan Cristea Gallery, London. Joe Tilson at 90
- Academician's Room, Royal Academy of Arts, London. Joe Tilson RA
- 2016 Marlborough Fine Art, London. Tilson: The Stones of Venice, Marlborough Fine Art, London
- 2016 Alan Cristea Gallery, London. Tilson, Words and Images: The Notebooks
- 2013 Marlborough Fine Art, London. Joe Tilson : A Survey
- 2012–13 University of Ljubljana
- 2012 Bugno Art Gallery, Venice
- 2009 Alan Cristea Gallery, London
- 2008 Bugno Art Gallery, Venice
- 2007 Waddington Galleries, London
- 2006 Palazzo Doria, Loano (retrospective)
- Menhir Arte Contemporanea, La Spezia
- 2004 Beaux Arts Gallery, London
- 2002 Royal Academy of Arts, London (retrospective)
- Alan Cristea Gallery, London (prints)
- Beaux Arts Gallery, London
- 2001 Castelbasso, Abruzzo (retrospective)
- Giò Marconi Gallery, Milan (retrospective)
- 1999–2000 Palazzo Pubblico, Siena, touring to Galleria Comunale d'Arte, Cesena and Pinacoteca Civica, Follonica
- 1999 Peter Guyther Gallery, London
- Theo Waddington, Boca Raton, Florida
- Castello Doria, Porto Venere
- 1998 Theo Waddington Fine Art, London
- Marino alla Scala, Milan
- 1997 Cankarjev Dom, Ljubljana (prints retrospective)
- 1996 Annandale Galleries, Sydney
- Mestna Gallery, Ljubljana
- 1995 Westend Galerie, Frankfurt
- Palazzo Pubblico, Siena
- Theo Waddington Fine Art, London
- Alan Cristea Gallery, London
- 1994 Pinacoteca, Macerata
- Galleria Rotta, Genova
- 1993 Multimedia, Brescia
- Gio Marconi, Milan
- Cooperativa Ceramica d'Imola
- Heter A Hunermann Galerie GmbH, Düsseldorf
- 1992 Extra Moemia, Todi
- Waddington Graphics, London
- Waddington Galleries, London
- 1991 Plymouth City Museum
- Tour Fromage, Aosta
- Galerie Inge Baecker, Cologne
- 1990 Centro Culturale Fontanella Borghese, Rome
- Fortezza Medicea, Cortona
- 1984 Arnolfini Gallery, Bristol (retrospective)
- 1979 Vancouver Art Gallery (prints retrospective)
- 1978 Tate Gallery, London (prints)
- 1976 Marlborough Fine Art, Marlborough Graphics, London
- 1971 Museum Boijmans van Beuningen, Rotterdam (retrospective) touring to Belgium and Italy
- Waddington Galleries, London
- 1970 Marlborough New London Gallery, London
- 1968 Galleria Ferrari, Verona
- Galleria de'Foscherari, Bologna
- Galerie Brusberg, Hanover
- 1967 Galleria del Naviglio, Milan
- Marlborough Galleria d'Arte, Rome
- 1966 Marlborough New London Gallery, London
- 1965 Kunstamt Renickendorf, Berlin
- Stadt Museum, Recklinghausen
- Kunstverein, Braunschweig
- Stedelijk Museum, Amsterdam
- 1964 Marlborough New London Gallery, London
- British Pavilion, XXXII Venice Biennale
- Modern Galerija, Zagreb
- 1963 Hatton Gallery, Newcastle upon Tyne
- Ferens Art Gallery, Hull
- Walker Art Gallery, Liverpool
- University Art Gallery, Nottingham
- 1962 Marlborough New London Gallery

== Collections ==
Tilson's art is held in public collections including the Tate Gallery, London; MoMA, New York and the Stedelijk, Amsterdam.
