= Night Boat to Cairo =

1979 single by Madness

- Artwork for 1993 UK rerelease

Single by Madness

from the album One Step Beyond... and Work Rest and Play
- Released: 1980 / 1993
- Recorded: 1979
- Genre: Ska; pop; 2 tone
- Length: 3:31
- Label: Virgin
- Composer: Mike Barson
- Lyricist: Graham McPherson
- Producers: Clive Langer; Alan Winstanley

Madness singles chronology
"My Girl" (1979)	"Night Boat to Cairo" (1980)	"Baggy Trousers" (1980)
"The Harder They Come" (1992)	"Night Boat to Cairo (re-release)" (1993)	"Lovestruck" (1999)

"Night Boat to Cairo" is a song by British ska/pop band Madness from their debut 1979 album One Step Beyond.... It was written by Mike Barson and Suggs and was also included on the 1980 EP Work Rest and Play, which peaked at number six on the UK Singles Chart and reached the top 30 in Belgium, Ireland and the Netherlands. The song was later re-issued in the UK in 1993 following the success of the re-issued version of "It Must Be Love" but failed to reach the top 40, peaking at number 56. It was remixed slightly for inclusion on the band's eponymous 1983 album compiled for the United States. The song is featured in the 2011 Wii video game Just Dance 3.

The song is often used by Madness to close live concerts, and "Night Boat" has passed into cockney rhyming slang as a term for a giro, or unemployment benefit cheque.

== Background and composition ==
The song was composed as an instrumental by Barson, but was expanded when Suggs added lyrics. The song has an unusual structure, with a single long verse followed by an even longer instrumental section, heavily sax-based. At one point, after a key change from C to F, the instrumental slows right down and momentarily stops, then the opening notes of the song are repeated before the tempo picks up again. Suggs has described it as "miles of introduction, a couple of verses then miles of instrumental, no chorus and the title isn't even mentioned apart from me shouting it at the beginning. It's an atmosphere with great music and words- of course it IS a song, but not a traditional one."

== Music video ==
Lee Thompson plays saxophone

After the decision to issue the Work Rest and Play EP, a promotional music video was needed. However, there was not enough time to make an effective video before the record was released, so a low-budget karaoke-type video was hastily filmed in a studio instead.

The video featured the band dressed in stereotypical British colonial attire, including short trousers and Wolesley pattern pith helmets, in front of a chroma keyed backdrop of an Egyptian pyramid; the lyrics appearing on screen in "bouncing ball" style as Suggs sang them. During the long instrumental sections of the song, the band ran and jumped around the set, marching and performing their signature "Nutty Train".

Despite – or perhaps because of – the poor effects and editing, and all-round unprofessional feel, it became very popular with fans, perhaps also due to the carefree nature and fooling around of the band onscreen that can be attributed to the large amount of alcohol they consumed while filming.

However, this music video was not used with the 1993 reissue and remixes.

== Appearances ==
In addition to its EP release and appearance on the album One Step Beyond... "Night Boat to Cairo" also appears on the Madness collections Divine Madness (a.k.a. The Heavy Heavy Hits), Complete Madness, It's... Madness Too, The Business, Our House, Madness and Ultimate Collection. Most compilations contain the album version of the track.

== Formats and track listings ==
These are the formats and track listings of major single releases of "Night Boat to Cairo".

- 7" single
1. "Night Boat to Cairo" (Barson/McPherson) - 3:31
2. "Night Boat to Cairo (Paul Gotel Rude Edit)" (Barson/McPherson) - 3:45
- 12" single
1. "Night Boat to Cairo (Paul Gotel Rude Mix)" (Barson/McPherson) - 7:59
2. "Night Boat to Cairo (Paul Gotel Rude Edit)" (Barson/McPherson) - 3:45
3. "Night Boat to Cairo (Well Hung Parliament Dub Edit)" (Barson/McPherson) - 5:35
4. "Night Boat to Cairo (Paul Gotel Rude Instrumental)" (Barson/McPherson) - 7:54
- CD single
1. "Night Boat to Cairo (Barson/McPherson)" - 3:31
2. "Night Boat to Cairo (Paul Gotel Rude Mix)" (Barson/McPherson) - 7:59
3. "Night Boat to Cairo (Paul Gotel Rude Edit)" (Barson/McPherson) - 3:45
4. "Night Boat to Cairo (Well Hung Parliament Dub Edit)" (Barson/McPherson) - 5:35
5. "Night Boat to Cairo (Paul Gotel Rude Instrumental)" (Barson/McPherson) - 7:54

== Influence ==
The song inspired the Israeli hit "Rakevet Laila (Le-Kahir)" (Hebrew for "Night Train (to Cairo)" / רכבת לילה ) by the Israeli rock group Mashina.

The song was covered by the British Death metal ensemble Monoptera.

== Charts ==
Chart (1980)	Peak position
Belgium (Ultratop 50 Flanders)	25
Ireland (IRMA)	12
Netherlands (Dutch Top 40)	21
Netherlands (Single Top 100)	29
UK Singles (OCC)	6

Chart (1993)	Peak position
UK Singles (OCC)	56

== Certifications ==
Region	Certification	Certified units/sales
United Kingdom (BPI)	Silver	200,000^{‡}
^{‡} Sales+streaming figures based on certification alone.
