= One Better Day =

1984 single by Madness

Single by Madness

from the album Keep Moving
- B-side: "Guns"; "Victoria Gardens"; "Sarah"
- Released: 2 June 1984
- Studio: AIR (London); Liquidator Studios, London
- Genre: Sophisti-pop
- Length: 4:06
- Label: Stiff
- Composer: Mark Bedford
- Lyricist: Graham McPherson
- Producers: Clive Langer; Alan Winstanley

Madness singles chronology
"Michael Caine" (1984)	"One Better Day" (1984)	"Yesterday's Men" (1985)

Music video
- "One Better Day" on YouTube

"One Better Day" is a song by the English ska band Madness from their fifth studio album Keep Moving (1984). The song, written by Suggs (Graham McPherson) and Mark Bedford, was released as a single in the United Kingdom, and spent seven weeks in the charts peaking at number 17. The song also peaked at number 8 in Ireland.

The single was a last minute choice, as "Victoria Gardens" from the same album was originally slated to be the album's second single. The remixed version of "Victoria Gardens" intended for the A-side was instead included as a bonus track on the 12" single. The substitution was likely made to avoid releasing two consecutive singles with Carl Smyth as lead vocalist, following the disappointing (by their standards) sales of "Michael Caine" and widespread rumours that Suggs was about to leave, or had already left, the band.

This was the last single on the Stiff Records label, before the band's creation of their own label, Zarjazz Records, in August. The B-side "Guns" was McPherson's first solo writing credit and meant that all seven members of the group had at least one solo composition. The 12" B-side "Sarah" was also the band's first song recorded at their newly completed Liquidator Studios.

== Theme ==
In an interview with Daniel Rachel, for the 2013 book Isle of Noise: Conversations with Great Songwriters, Suggs said: "The idea of that song was when you'd hear people say, 'Oh, he's seen better days,' like when you see a guy in a suit looking a bit tatty. I thought, 'What was that one better day?' Then I had the idea that he would meet this other homeless person that happened to be a woman – and they fell in love. Between them they could engender one better day as people who had, supposedly, seen better days."

== Music video ==
The single was the final release under Stiff Records and the label did not want to produce an accompanying music video, so the band had to fund it themselves. Mike Barson flew from Amsterdam especially and a video was filmed in London's Arlington Road, just outside the homeless refuge Arlington House, which is mentioned in the first line of the song.

Most of the video shows the band members as homeless people, except a few clips showing them performing the song. It also shows Suggs dancing with his wife Bette Bright, who plays a homeless woman in the video.

== Appearances ==
In addition to its single release and appearance on the album Keep Moving, "One Better Day" also appears on the Madness collections Divine Madness (a.k.a. The Heavy Heavy Hits, 1992), Utter Madness (1986), Total Madness (1997), The Business (1993) and Our House: The Original Songs (2002). It did not appear on any of the band's US compilations.

== Formats and track listings ==
These are the formats and track listings of major single releases of "One Better Day".

- 7" Single
1. "One Better Day" (McPherson, Bedford) – 4:06
2. "Guns" (McPherson) – 3:14
- 12" Single
1. "One Better Day" (McPherson, Bedford) – 4:06
2. "Guns" (McPherson) – 3:14
3. "Victoria Gardens" (Smyth, Barson) – 4:01
4. "Sarah" (Thompson, Madness) – 3:43

== Charts ==
Chart (1984)	Peak position
UK Singles (Official Charts)	17
