= Drip Fed Fred =

2000 single by Ian Dury and Madness

Single by Madness featuring Ian Dury

from the album Wonderful
- Released: 28 February 2000
- Recorded: 1999
- Genre: Pop, ska
- Length: 4:13
- Label: Virgin
- Songwriters: Mike Barson, Lee Thompson
- Producers: Clive Langer, Alan Winstanley

Madness singles chronology
"Johnny the Horse" (1999)	"Drip Fed Fred" (2000)	"Shame & Scandal" (2005)

Ian Dury singles chronology
"Y2K the Bug Is Coming" (1999)	"Drip Fed Fred" (2000)	"Dance Little Rude Boy" (2002)

"Drip Fed Fred" is a single by British band Madness from their 1999 album Wonderful, featuring Ian Dury on vocals. It was released as a single in February 2000, peaking at number 55 on the UK Singles Chart. It was the last song to which Dury contributed his voice, before he died in March 2000.

== Track listings ==
Two versions of the single were released on CD.

CD1

1. "Drip Fed Fred" (The Conspiracy mix) - 4:13 (Thompson/Barson)
2. "Elysium" - 3:53 (Thompson/Woodgate)
3. "Light of the Way" - 2:41 (Smyth)

CD2

1. "Drip Fed Fred" (The Conspiracy mix) - 4:13 (Thompson/Barson)
2. "Elysium" - 3:53 (Thompson/Woodgate)
3. "We Want Freddie" - 3:41 (Thompson/Barson)
- "The Conspiracy Mix" is an edited version of the album track with an altered rhythm track and an earlier fade out.
- "We Want Freddie" is a demo version of the lead track, not featuring Ian Dury.

=== Record Store Day reissue ===
The song was reissued on 7" vinyl for Record Store Day 2017, as a double A-side with "Johnny the Horse".

7" vinyl

1. "Drip Fed Fred" (album version) (Thompson/Barson) - 4:30
2. "Johnny the Horse" (radio edit) (Smyth) - 3:19

== Charts ==
Chart (2000)	Peak position
UK Singles (Official Charts)	55
