= Wings of a Dove (Madness song) =

1983 single by Madness

Single by Madness

from the album Keep Moving (US) Non-album single (UK)
- B-side: "Behind the 8 Ball"; "One's Second Thoughtlessness"
- Released: 15 August 1983
- Recorded: 1983
- Studio: AIR (London)
- Genre: Calypso
- Length: 3:01
- Label: Stiff
- Songwriters: Graham McPherson (lyrics); Carl Smyth (lyrics and music)
- Producers: Clive Langer; Alan Winstanley

Madness singles chronology
"Tomorrow's (Just Another Day)/Madness (Is All in the Mind)" (1983)	"Wings of a Dove" (1983)	"The Sun and the Rain" (1983)

Music video
- "Wings of a Dove" on YouTube

"Wings of a Dove" (also known as "Wings of a Dove (A Celebratory Song)") is a song by the English ska and pop band Madness. It was released in 1983 as a stand-alone single and later in 1984 it was included on the American version of their studio album Keep Moving. The single spent 10 weeks in the UK singles chart peaking at number 2. It peaked at number 1 in Ireland.

"Wings of a Dove" was written by Suggs and Chas Smash and they also share lead vocals here. The song featured steel drums by Creighton Steel Sounds and the gospel choir The Inspirational Choir of the Pentecostal First Born Church of the Living God. In 1985, Madness offered the song as their contribution to the multi-artist compilation Greenpeace – The Album.

The song enjoyed a brief resurgence in popularity in 1999 when it was featured in the movie 10 Things I Hate About You. Madness performed a version live on BBC One on New Year's Eve, 2018.

== Promotional music video ==
The music video for the song depicts all involved in the record (including the steel band and choir) performing in a party atmosphere on board an aeroplane piloted by Chas Smash and co-piloted by Suggs. They all bail out in a small white van after Smash loses control of the plane, the final sequence shows the van, a first-generation Iveco Daily, parachuting gently down to earth. However, there is the back of a Ford Transit shown on the plane before the fall.

The clips of the parachuting Iveco Daily were originally filmed for a French television advert for the van. Dave Robinson, the founder of Stiff Records, as well as the sole director of Madness' music videos, had bought the rights to the footage some time earlier with the intention of including it in a Madness video, and the lyrical content of "Wings of a Dove" gave him the opportunity to use it.

== Track listing ==
- 7" single
1. "Wings of a Dove"
2. "Behind the 8 Ball"
- 12" single
1. "Wings of a Dove (Blue Train Mix)"
2. "Behind the 8 Ball"
3. "One's Second Thoughtlessness"

== Charts ==
Chart (1983)	Peak position
Belgium (Ultratop 50 Flanders)	32
Ireland (IRMA)	1
UK Singles Chart	2

== Certifications and sales ==
Region	Certification	Certified units/sales
United Kingdom (BPI)	Silver	250,000^{^}
^{^} Shipments figures based on certification alone.
