= Jake Tilson =

English artist and graphic designer

Jake Tilson (born 1958 in London) is an English artist, graphic designer, writer and publisher.

Author and designer of A Tale of 12 Kitchens (2006), he published the arts magazines Cipher (1979–1981) and Atlas (1985–1993), taught in the Communication Design department at the Royal College of Art (1987–1999) and also works as a journalist. A retrospective exhibition of his art work was held at the Museo Internacional de Electrografia in Cuenca, Spain (1997), part funded by The British Council. He was an early adopter of the World Wide Web as a medium for art, using his website TheCooker (1994). As a graphic designer he has produced work for companies such as Paul Smith, Haworth Tompkins, Royal National Theatre and Warehouse plc. He is a trustee of the Oxford Symposium on Food & Cookery.

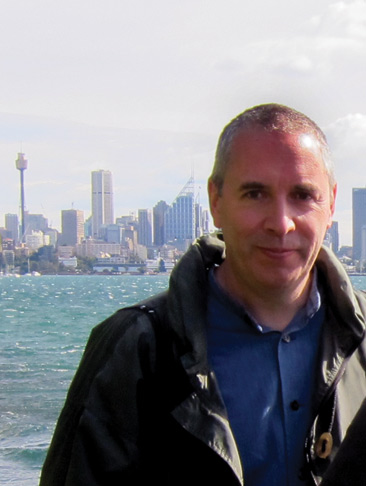
Jake Tilson

== Early life and education ==
Jake Tilson was born in London, the son of Joe Tilson and Joslyn Tilson (née Morton). His grandfather was Alastair Morton, who ran his father's business the Edinburgh Weavers, commissioning artists such as Ben Nicholson and Barbara Hepworth. Jake studied painting at Chelsea School of Art from 1976–79, and at the Royal College of Art from 1980–83. He won the Royal of Art Major Travelling scholarship and spent a year working in Paris, where he had his first one-person exhibition at Galerie J et J Donguy.

== Work ==
In 1979 he set up the small independent press, The Woolley Dale Press, which enabled him to publish limited edition book works and the arts/literary magazine Cipher, helped by a grant from the Greater London Arts Association. After leaving college in 1983 he continued publishing, including the trilingual arts magazine, Atlas, which sold in 15 countries. Atlas became the name of his next independent press in 1993 which published his audio works and books such as 3 Found Fonts (2003). Throughout the 1990s Tilson exhibited widely and had a commercial dealer, the Nigel Greenwood Gallery in London. During this time his work was primarily collage based wall pieces and sculptural dioramas. He was Erna Plachte artist in residence at the Ruskin School of Drawing and Fine Art, Oxford University (1994–95) where he developed his website TheCooker (1994) as well as designing websites for the Laboratory at the Ruskin (1994) he designed websites for the Royal Institute of International Affairs (1995) and the Royal College of Art (1996).

His most recent exhibition was at the Venice Architecture Biennale 2012, commissioned by Haworth Tompkins Architects as part of the Common Ground exhibition.

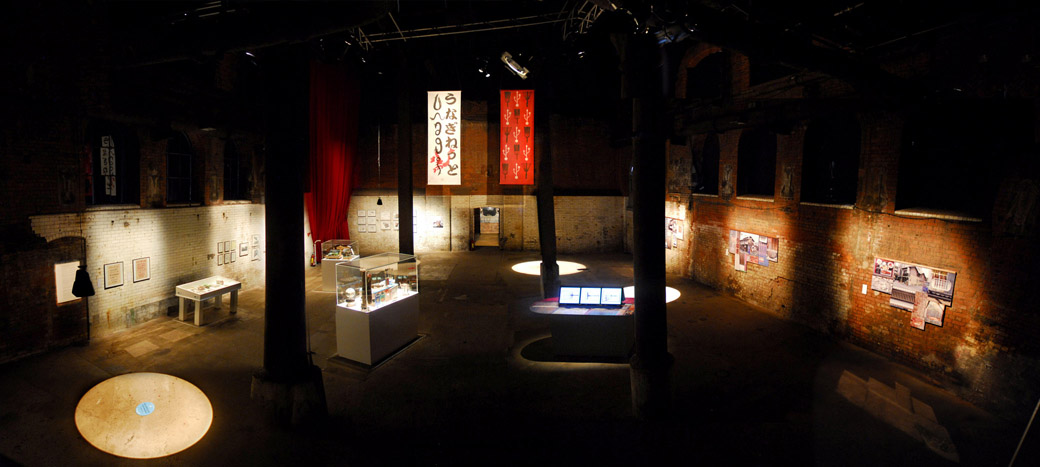
Exhibition, Jake Tilson and Kyoichi Tsuzuki, A Net of Eels

== Selected bibliography ==
No More Rules: Graphic Design and Postmodernism, Rick Poynor, 2013, Laurence King, ISBN 1780671032.

How To Survive Modern Art, Susie Hodge, Tate Publishing, 2009, ISBN 1854377493.

The Fundamentals of Graphic Design, Gavin Ambrose & Paul Harris, AVA Publishing, 2008, ISBN 2940373825.

The Designer and the Grid, Lucienne Roberts, Rotovision, 2005, ISBN 2880468140.

Influences: a Lexicon of Contemporary Graphic Design, Anna Gerber and Amy Lutz, Gestalten Verlag, 2006, ISBN 3899551524.

New Media Design, Tricia Austin and Richard Doust, Laurence King Publishers, 2005, ISBN 1856694313.

Elizabeth David – Her Life, Work and Influence, Eddie Cass, Portico Library Gallery, 2007, OCLC 747321710.

All Messed Up – Unpredictable Graphics, Anna Gerber, Laurence King, 2004, ISBN 1856693902.

Restart: New Systems in Graphic Design, Christian Küsters and Emily King, Thames & Hudson, 2001, ISBN 0500282978.

Vision: 50 Years of British Creativity, a Celebration of Art, Architecture and Design (Cutting Edge), Melvyn Bragg, Thames & Hudson, 1999, ISBN 0500019061.

New Media in Late 20th-century Art (World of Art), Michael Rush, Thames & Hudson World Art series, 1999, ISBN 0500203296.

== Selected bookworks ==
Light & Dark, Woolley Dale Press, 1979, ISBN 0 907508 00 6.

Exposure, Woolley Dale Press, 1980, ISBN 0 907508 07 3.

8 Views of Paris, Woolley Dale Press, 1980, ISBN 0 907508 08 1.

The V Agents, Woolley Dale Press, 1981, ISBN 0 907508 11 1.

Excavator-Barcelona-Excavador, Woolley Dale Press, 1986, ISBN 0907508189.

One World – A Guide, Warehouse PLC, 1987, ASIN: B001OQ29O4.

Breakfast Special, 5 books, Woolley Dale Press, 1989, ISBN 0 907508 23 5, ISBN 0 907508 24 3, ISBN 0 907508 25 1, ISBN 0 907508 26 X, ISBN 0 907508 27 8.

The Terminator Line, Woolley Dale Press, 1991, ISBN 0 907508 28 6.

3 Found Fonts, Atlas, 2003, ISBN 0 907508 37 5.

A Tale of 12 Kitchens, Weidenfeld & Nicolson, Artisan, 2006, ISBN 1841882623, ISBN 1579653200.

In At The Deep End – cooking fish Tokyo to Venice, Quadrille, ISBN 1844009750.

== Selected audioworks ==
City Sounds of the Everyday, podcasts, Atlas, 2012

City Picture Fiction, audio CD, Atlas, 1996

Hungerford Bridge, tide and trains, audio cassette, Atlas, 1998

Hannahsleeps, audio cassette, Atlas 1998

Gate 23, audio cassette, Atlas, 1993

Foundsounds, audio CD, Atlas, 1993

== Public collections ==
Tate Gallery Collection.

Chase Manhattan Bank.

Arthur Andersen & Co.

BBC World Service.

The Principal Financial Group, USA.
