= Lovestruck (Madness song) =

1999 single by Madness

Single by Madness

from the album Wonderful
- B-side: "We Are Love"; "Round and Round"; "Maddley"
- Released: 19 July 1999
- Length: 3:50
- Label: Virgin
- Songwriters: Mike Barson; Lee Thompson
- Producers: Clive Langer; Alan Winstanley

Madness singles chronology
"The Harder They Come" (1992)	"Lovestruck" (1999)	"Johnny the Horse" (1999)

Music video
- "Lovestruck" by Madness on YouTube

"Lovestruck" is a song by the English ska and pop band Madness, released as the lead single from their seventh studio album, Wonderful (1999), on 19 July 1999. This release marked the first time Madness had put out original material for over 10 years and signified their return to music. "Lovestruck" peaked at number 10 on the UK singles chart, which was the first time a new Madness release had reached the top 10 since the 1983 release "The Sun and the Rain". The song also charted in Iceland, reaching number 36 on the Íslenski Listinn Topp 40.

"Lovestruck" was re-issued on 7-inch vinyl for Record Store Day in 2015, with "Le Grand Pantalon" (a slowed-down version of "Baggy Trousers") as the B-side. The release came packaged with a 3D pop-up theatre designed by Pollock's Toy Museum.

== Track listings ==
"Maddley" is a medley of songs from Madness's then upcoming album, Wonderful ("If I Didn't Care" / "Drip Fed Fred" / "Elysium" / "Johnny the Horse" / "The Wizard" / "4 AM" / "Going to the Top" / "You're Wonderful")

UK CD1

1. "Lovestruck" (Thompson, Barson)
2. "We Are Love" (Smyth)
3. "Lovestruck" (enhanced video)

UK CD2 and cassette single

1. "Lovestruck" (Thompson, Barson)
2. "Round and Round" (Thompson, Barson)
3. "Maddley" (Barson, Smyth, Thompson, McPherson, D. Woodgate, N. Woodgate, Jack Lawrence)

European CD single

1. "Lovestruck" (Thompson, Barson)
2. "Maddley" (Barson, Smyth, Thompson, McPherson, D. Woodgate, N. Woodgate, Jack Lawrence)

7-inch vinyl (Record Store Day)

1. "Lovestruck" (Thompson, Barson)
2. "Le Grand Pantalon" (Barson, Foreman, McPherson, Smyth, Woodgate, Thompson, Bedford)

== Charts ==
=== Weekly charts ===
Chart (1999)	Peak position
Europe (Eurochart Hot 100)	43
Iceland (Íslenski Listinn Topp 40)	36
Scottish Singles Sales (Official Charts)	16
UK Singles (Official Charts)	10

=== Year-end charts ===
Chart (1999)	Position
UK Singles (OCC)	182
