= The Prince (song) =

Single by Madness

Single by Madness

from the album One Step Beyond...
- B-side: "Madness"
- Released: 10 August 1979
- Recorded: 16 June 1979
- Studio: Pathway (London)
- Genre: Rocksteady; two-tone
- Length: 2:30 (single version); 3:18 (album version)
- Label: 2 Tone
- Songwriter: Lee Thompson
- Producer: Clanger

Madness singles chronology
"The Prince" (1979)	"One Step Beyond" (1979)

Audio
- "The Prince" by Madness on YouTube

"The Prince" is a song by the English ska and pop band Madness. It was written by Lee Thompson, and was the band's first single. The single was released through 2 Tone Records on 10 August 1979, and peaked at number 16 on the UK singles chart, spending a total of 11 weeks on the chart.

"The Prince" is a tribute to Jamaican ska singer Prince Buster, who influenced Madness (the band took their name from one of his songs, "Madness", which they covered on the B-side of "The Prince").

== Music video ==
As this was the band's first single, they were relatively unknown prior to the release. Due to this fact, no music video was filmed for the single. However, the band later bought the rights to a performance on Top of the Pops from 6 September 1979. This performance used the single version of this song and has featured on compilations featuring the band's music videos.

In 2022, Madness released two new videos for the album versions of this song and “Madness”, with footage taken from the 1981 Madness' documentary movie Take It or Leave It.

== Different recordings ==
The song was initially recorded on 16 June 1979 at Pathway Studios, Highbury. The track was then remixed on 9 July of the same year, along with the single's B-side, "Madness". The remix was in order to remove the hum from Lee Thompson's saxophone solo. However, Mike Barson showed displeasure at the mix of "Madness".

The song was re-recorded later that year for the One Step Beyond... album. As well as having a distinctively clearer sound, the song's lyrics were slightly altered, and Mike Barson later admitted in the 33⅓ book One Step Beyond... that he preferred it to the single version. The B-side, "Madness", was also re-recorded for the album in a more multi-layered arrangement.

== Track listing ==
=== 7" vinyl single ===
Side one

1. "The Prince" (Lee Thompson) – 2:30

Side two

1. "Madness" (Cecil Campbell) – 2:32

== Charts ==
Chart (1979)	Peak position
UK Singles (OCC)	16
