= Michael Caine (song) =

1984 single by Madness

Single by Madness

from the album Keep Moving
- B-side: "If You Think There's Something"
- Released: 30 January 1984
- Recorded: 1983
- Studio: AIR (London)
- Genre: Pop
- Length: 3:39
- Label: Stiff
- Composer: Daniel Woodgate
- Lyricist: Carl Smyth
- Producers: Clive Langer; Alan Winstanley

Madness singles chronology
"The Sun and the Rain" (1983)	"Michael Caine" (1984)	"One Better Day" (1984)

Audio sample
- file; help

Music video
- "Michael Caine" by Madness on YouTube

"Michael Caine" is a song by the English ska and pop band Madness, released on 30 January 1984 as the lead single from their fifth studio album Keep Moving (1984). The song was written by Carl Smyth and Daniel Woodgate, and features Smyth on lead vocals in place of usual Madness vocalist Suggs. "Michael Caine" spent eight weeks on the UK singles chart, peaking at number 11.

== Lyrical content ==
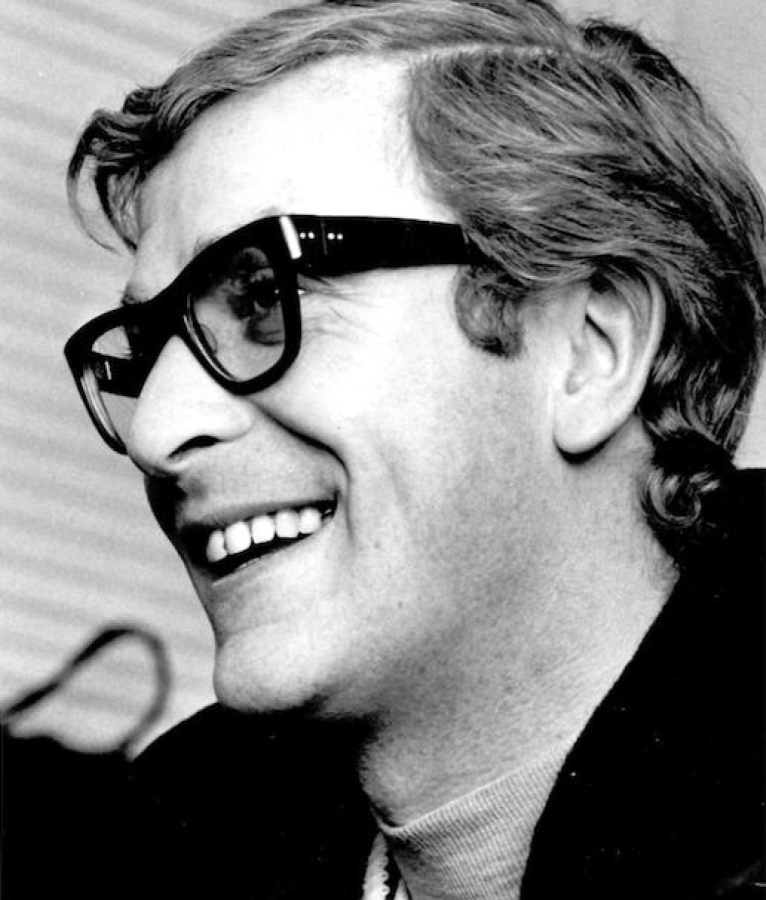
Michael Caine (pictured in 1967), whom the song is named after.

The song is about an informant during the Troubles, and the lyrics suggest a state of paranoia and mental disintegration. It is named after English actor Michael Caine and includes his vocal samples, recorded specifically for this song. The song's hook, a repetition of Caine introducing himself by name, recalls his role in the spy film The Ipcress File (1965), in which his character, Harry Palmer, repeats his name while trying to stay sane under torture.

When he was approached to appear on the record, Caine initially turned it down, but his younger daughter, on hearing his decision, made him change his mind, telling him how popular the band were.

Speaking of the song's lyrics and the idea behind the use of Caine's name, Carl Smyth told Record Mirror in 1984, "The record's about informers. If you think of informers who are current news then that's a clue. At the same time, I wouldn't do a song just about Michael Caine – it's not a tribute or anything like that. I was trying to think of who could be used to illustrate it, and his name seemed right – his film The Ipcress File had the sort of atmosphere I wanted to create – we even used some of the phrases."

== Music video ==
The music video was also based on The Ipcress File, and featured a lightbulb being shot, as seen in the title sequence from the television spy series Callan. A photograph of Michael Caine from the 60s is also seen being shredded in the video. The video took longer to complete than usual, due to being shot on 35 mm film as opposed to 16 mm. As a result, Mike Barson is absent for much of the video; he had a plane to catch, and could not stay for the whole filming session.

== Critical reception ==
Upon its release, Pet Shop Boys' Neil Tennant, then a journalist for Smash Hits, stated, "This new Madness single is world-weary and melancholy, although it's brightened up by the man himself declaring 'I am Michael Caine' every now and then. I like it, actually." Tony Parsons of NME praised the "beautiful, understated melody" and "hesitant, almost shy lyric that is not without flashes of humour" and concluded, "They never sounded less like Madness and they never sounded so good."

Thompson Twins' member Joe Leeway, as guest reviewer for Record Mirror, described it as "more melodic than usual" and "a mysterious 'out in the cold' song" with a "great sax vamp towards the end". Frank Hopkinson of Number One noted Smyth's "Bowie-ish vocal" and commented, "Suggs has stepped down for a single that still includes Mike Barson but is stripped of the usual Madness trademarks (including the hum-along tune). I know it's unthinkable, but this one might not even make the top ten!" The song's peak at 11 on the UK Singles Chart ended a run of six consecutive top 10 singles for the group.

== Formats and track listings ==
- 7" single
1. "Michael Caine" (Carl Smyth, Daniel Woodgate) – 3:39
2. "If You Think There's Something" (Mike Barson) – 3:08
- 12" single
1. "Michael Caine (extended version)" (Smyth, Woodgate) – 4:08
2. "Michael Caine" (Smyth, Woodgate) – 3:39
3. "If You Think There's Something" (Barson) – 3:08

== Charts ==
Chart (1984)	Peak position
UK Singles (OCC)	11
