= One Step Beyond... =

Studio album by Madness
- Released: 19 October 1979
- Recorded: September 1979
- Studios: Eden, London; T.W., London
- Genres: 2 Tone; ska; rocksteady; new wave; R&B
- Length: 39:02
- Labels: Stiff (Europe); Sire (North America)
- Producers: Clive Langer; Alan Winstanley

Madness chronology
One Step Beyond... (1979)	Absolutely (1980)

Singles from One Step Beyond...
- 1. "The Prince" Released: 10 August 1979 (single version from 2 Tone Records); 2. "One Step Beyond" Released: 19 October 1979; 3. "My Girl" Released: 21 December 1979; 4. "Night Boat to Cairo" Released: 21 March 1980 (from Work Rest and Play EP)

One Step Beyond... is the debut studio album by the English ska and pop band Madness, released on 19 October 1979 by Stiff Records. Recorded and mixed in about three weeks, the album peaked at number two and remained on the UK Albums Chart for more than a year. The album has received much critical praise. It was ranked 90th in a 2005 survey held by British television station Channel 4 to determine the 100 greatest albums of all time.

This was the first album produced by the team of Clive Langer and Alan Winstanley, who would go on to produce more Madness albums and to work with artists including Elvis Costello and the Attractions, Morrissey, Dexys Midnight Runners, They Might Be Giants and David Bowie.

== Background ==
The "Nutty Train" photo on the sleeve, shot by Cameron McVey, was inspired by a photo of Kilburn and the High Roads roadie Paul Tonkin that appeared on the back cover of the band's album Handsome.

The title track, released as a single, was originally written and recorded by the Jamaican ska musician Prince Buster, and its "Don't watch that, watch this ..." introduction is adapted from another Prince Buster song, "The Scorcher". The track "The Prince" is a tribute to Buster and a re-recording of the band's debut single, originally released on the 2 Tone label. Its B-side, "Madness", another Prince Buster song, was also re-recorded for the album. "Madness" and "Bed and Breakfast Man" were released as singles in North America through Sire Records.

After the album's initial release, reissues were released in 2009 and 2014 by Union Square Music's collector's label Salvo, each containing additional material such as video productions featuring the band.

== Critical reception and legacy ==
Professional ratings
Review scores
Source	Rating
AllMusic	4.5/5 stars
Christgau's Record Guide	B+
Mojo	4/5 stars
Q	4/5 stars
Record Collector	5/5 stars
Record Mirror	3/5 stars
The Rolling Stone Album Guide	3.5/5 stars
Smash Hits	6/10
Sounds	5/5 stars
Uncut	4/5 stars

In Sounds, Garry Bushell praised One Step Beyond... as "an intensely enjoyable album, a disc of many moods", writing that "Madness manage to add a Billy Bentley cockney stamp to their very own brand of reggae crossed with sax embroidered, happy fairground nuttiness and it works surprisingly well." NME critic Deanne Pearson found that the album affirmed "that they have a style and distinctiveness of their own", observing "a warm, easy familiarity about Madness" distinguishing them from fellow ska band the Specials.

One Step Beyond..., along with the Specials' self-titled debut—released on the same day in October 1979—played an important part in popularising 2 tone music in the UK. The albums were also a great influence on other bands of the genre.

== Track listing ==
Side one
No.	Title	Writer(s)	Length
1.	"One Step Beyond"	Cecil Campbell	2:18
2.	"My Girl"	Mike Barson	2:44
3.	"Night Boat to Cairo"	Graham McPherson; Barson	3:31
4.	"Believe Me"	John Hasler; Barson	2:28
5.	"Land of Hope & Glory"	Lee Thompson	2:57
6.	"The Prince"	Thompson	3:18
7.	"Tarzan's Nuts"	Chas Smash; Barson; Sydney Lee	2:24

Side two
No.	Title	Writer(s)	Length
8.	"In the Middle of the Night"	Chris Foreman; McPherson	3:01
9.	"Bed and Breakfast Man"	Barson	2:33
10.	"Razor Blade Alley"	Thompson	2:42
11.	"Swan Lake"	Pyotr Ilyich Tchaikovsky; arranged by Barson	2:36
12.	"Rockin' in A♭"	Willy "Wurlitzer" Smith	2:29
13.	"Mummy's Boy"	Mark Bedford	2:23
14.	"Madness"	Campbell	2:38
15.	"Chipmunks Are Go!"	Brendan Smyth; Smash	0:51

=== Extra material ===
The 2009 reissue also includes the music videos for "The Prince", "One Step Beyond", "My Girl", "Night Boat to Cairo" and "Bed and Breakfast Man". The first four of these were also included on the version of One Step Beyond... issued as part of the box set The Lot. The bonus disc contains B-sides as well as all three songs previously only released on the Work Rest and Play EP in April 1980.

A 35th-anniversary edition was released in 2014. It includes 14 of 20 tracks from a 1979 rehearsal tape entitled "Fab Toones" and a DVD featuring videos, Top of the Pops and Old Grey Whistle Test appearances and a BBC documentary.

=== 2009 reissue ===
Disc 1
The original album

- The first disc contains the fifteen tracks from the original album plus five promo videos.

The promo videos

No.	Title	Length
1.	"The Prince"
2.	"One Step Beyond..."
3.	"Bed and Breakfast Man"
4.	"My Girl"
5.	"Night Boat to Cairo"

Disc 2
The John Peel Session

No.	Title	Writer(s)	Length
1.	"The Prince"	Thompson	2:31
2.	"Bed and Breakfast Man"	Barson	3:24
3.	"Land of Hope & Glory"	Thompson	2:42
4.	"Stepping into Line"	Hasler; McPherson; Foreman	2:38

The bonus tracks

No.	Title	Writer(s)	Length
5.	"One Step Beyond" (7" single version)	Campbell	2:17
6.	"My Girl" (demo version with Mike Barson on vocals)	Barson	2:58
7.	"Mistakes" (B-side of "One Step Beyond")	Hasler; Barson	2:52
8.	"Un Paso Adelante" ("One Step Beyond" Spanish version)	Campbell	2:33
9.	"Nutty Theme" (B-side of "One Step Beyond" 12")	Thompson; McPherson	2:10
10.	"My Girl" (ballad version) (from Flexipop flexi disc)	Barson	2:28
11.	"Stepping into Line" (B-side of "My Girl")	Hasler; McPherson; Foreman	2:15
12.	"Un Passo Avanti" ("One Step Beyond" Italian version)	Campbell	2:22
13.	"Deceives the Eye" (Work Rest and Play EP)	Bedford; Foreman	2:00
14.	"The Young and the Old" (Work Rest and Play EP)	McPherson; Barson	2:04
15.	"Don't Quote Me on That" (Work Rest and Play EP)	Smyth; Barson; Foreman; McPherson; Bedford; Thompson; Woodgate	4:31
16.	"Razor Blade Alley" (Dance Craze live version)	Thompson	2:35
17.	"Night Boat to Cairo" (Dance Craze live version)	McPherson; Barson	3:12
18.	"One Step Beyond" (Dance Craze live version)	Campbell	2:53

Notes

- Tracks 1–4 recorded 14 August 1979 at BBC's Maida Vale Studios.
- Track 6 recorded at Pathway Studios during sessions for 2 Tone single "The Prince".

=== 2014 reissue ===
Original album

- Contains the fifteen tracks from the original album plus fourteen bonus tracks.

'Fab Toones!' rehearsal tape, 1979

No.	Title	Writer(s)	Length
16.	"Nutty Sounds"	McPherson; Thompson; Bedford; Foreman	3:13
17.	"Mistakes"	Hasler; Barson	2:53
18.	"Sunshine Voice"	Hasler; Barson	3:32
19.	"My Girl"	Barson	2:50
20.	"Memories"	Foreman	2:31
21.	"Believe Me"	McPherson; Barson	2:39
22.	"Lost My Head"	McPherson; Barson	2:24
23.	"Razorblade Alley"	Thompson	2:33
24.	"Land of Hope & Glory"	Thompson	2:47
25.	"Mummy's Boy"	Bedford	2:21
26.	"In the Middle of the Night"	McPherson; Foreman	2:51
27.	"You Said"	McPherson; Barson	2:21
28.	"Stepping into Line"	Hasler; McPherson; Foreman	2:29
29.	"Bed and Breakfast Man"	Barson	4:15

- All bonus tracks are previously unreleased and recorded in mono on a portable cassette recorder on 28 April 1979.
- The remaining six tracks from "Fab Toones!" were not included on the CD due to space constraints. However, these tracks were available as downloads.

Downloads

No.	Title	Writer(s)	Length
30.	"Madness"	Campbell	2:20
31.	"My Mates"	Bedford; Barson	2:40
32.	"Shop Around"	Smokey Robinson; Berry Gordy	3:01
33.	"There's Always Something There to Remind Me"	Burt Bacharach; Hal David	4:05
34.	"Swan Lake"	Tchaikovsky; arranged by Barson	2:49
35.	"Rockin' in A♭"	Wurlitzer	2:09

== Singles ==
- "The Prince" b/w "Madness" (2-Tone single version), August 1979
- "One Step Beyond" (single mix) b/w "Mistakes" on the 7" single, "One Step Beyond" (12" Mix) b/w "Mistakes", "Nutty Theme" on the 12" single, October 1979
- "My Girl" b/w "Stepping into Line" (plus "In the Rain" as an extra track on the UK 12" single), December 1979
- Work Rest and Play EP ("Night Boat to Cairo", "Deceives the Eye", "The Young and the Old" and "Don't Quote Me on That"), March 1980
- "Madness" b/w "Mistakes", US, March 1980
- "Bed and Breakfast Man" b/w "Night Boat to Cairo", Canada, April 1980
- "Tarzan's Nuts" b/w "Night Boat to Cairo" (Stiff 4338), The Netherlands, May 1980
- "Don't Quote Me on That" (4:08 Mix) b/w "Swan Lake", 1980

== Music videos ==
Five promotional music videos were filmed to promote the singles during the album's release. All of these, with the exception of "The Prince" (which was in fact a Top of the Pops performance only released in the UK and used the single version for the video) were in rotation on MTV during its first few years. Some of these promo videos were also featured in other music TV outlets, such as Top of the Pops. However, in 2022 Madness released two new videos for the album versions of "The Prince" and "Madness", with footage taken from the 1981 Madness' documentary movie Take It or Leave It.

Year	Video	Director
1979	"The Prince" (single version & Top of the Pops performance clip)	Unknown
1979	"One Step Beyond"	Dave Robinson
1979	"Bed and Breakfast Man"	Dave Robinson
1979	"My Girl"	Unknown
1980	"Night Boat to Cairo"	Unknown
2022	""The Prince" (album version)	Dave Robinson
2022	"Madness"	Dave Robinson

== Personnel ==
- Graham "Suggs" McPherson – lead vocals
- Mike Barson – keyboards
- Chris Foreman – guitars
- Mark Bedford – bass
- Lee Thompson – saxophones, backing vocals, lead vocals on tracks 5 and 10
- Dan Woodgate – drums, percussion

Additional personnel

- Cathal "Chas Smash" Smyth – backing vocals, "various shouts and fancy footwork", lead vocals on tracks 1 and 15

NOTE: Smyth was not an official member of the band at the time of the album's recording or release. He would formally join Madness only a few weeks after One Step Beyond... was issued in October 1979.

- John Hasler – minder

Technical

- Clive Langer – producer
- Alan Winstanley – producer
- Stiff Records – cover artwork
- Julian Balme – cover artwork
- Eddie King – cover artwork
- Cameron McVey – front cover and band photography
- Chris Gabrin – back cover photography

2009 reissue

- Tim Turan – remastering
- Bob Sargeant – producer on John Peel sessions
- Malcolm Brown – engineer on John Peel sessions
- Bob Jones – engineer on John Peel sessions
- Madness – producer on bonus tracks 6 and 10
- Martin "Cally" Callomon – design, art direction
- Kerstin Rodgers – photography
- Irvine Welsh – liner notes

2014 reissue

- Tim Turan – remastering
- Stevie Chick – liner notes

== Chart performance ==
=== Original album ===
Chart (1979)	Peak position	Total weeks
Austrian Albums Chart	11	10
Finnish Albums Chart	23	6
Dutch Albums Chart	22	12
German Albums Chart	14	37
New Zealand Albums Chart	27	9
Norwegian Albums Chart	24	7
Swedish Albums Chart	12	7
UK Albums Chart	2	78
US Billboard Hot 200	128	9

Chart (2025)	Peak position
Greek Albums (IFPI)	76

=== 30th Anniversary Deluxe Edition ===
Chart (2009)	Peak position	Total weeks
UK Albums Chart	67	1

=== Year-end charts ===
Chart (1980)	Position
German Albums (Offizielle Top 100)	46

=== Singles ===
Date	Single	Chart	Position	Weeks
Sep 1979	"The Prince" (single version)	UK	16	11
Nov 1979	"One Step Beyond"	UK	7	14
Jan 1980	"My Girl"	UK	3	10
Apr 1980	"Night Boat to Cairo"	UK	6	8

== Certifications and sales ==
Certifications and sales for One Step Beyond...
Region	Certification	Certified units/sales
France (SNEP)	Gold	100,000^{*}
United Kingdom (BPI)	Platinum	300,000^{^}
^{*} Sales figures based on certification alone.^{^} Shipments figures based on certification alone.
