= Tomorrow's (Just Another Day) =

1983 single by Madness

Single by Madness

from the album The Rise & Fall
- B-side: "Madness (Is All in the Mind)"
- Released: 1 February 1983
- Recorded: 1982
- Studio: AIR (London, UK)
- Genre: Ska, new wave
- Length: 3:10
- Label: Stiff Records
- Composer: Mike Barson
- Lyricist: Carl Smyth
- Producers: Clive Langer; Alan Winstanley

Madness singles chronology
"Our House" (1982)	"Tomorrow's (Just Another Day)" / "Madness (Is All in the Mind)" (1983)	"Wings of a Dove" (1983)

"Tomorrow's (Just Another Day)" is a song by British band Madness from their fourth album The Rise & Fall. It spent 9 weeks in the UK charts, peaking at # 8 in February 1983. It was released as a double A-side with the Chris Foreman composition, "Madness (Is All in the Mind)".

The single version is a slight remix of the album track. A slower, blues-style version of the song, with Elvis Costello on vocals, was included as a bonus track on the 12" single. The latter version was later included as a bonus track on the 2004 2-disc reissue of Costello's Goodbye Cruel World album.

== Chart performance ==
Chart (1983)	Peak position
UK Singles (OCC)	8
West Germany (GfK)	43
