= Keep Moving (Madness album) =

Studio album by Madness
- Released: 20 February 1984
- Recorded: March–August 1983; September–December 1983
- Studios: AIR, London (recording); Genetic, Streatley (mixing)
- Genres: Ska; sophisti-pop; reggae; blue-eyed soul
- Length: 43:18
- Labels: Stiff (UK); Geffen (US)
- Producers: Clive Langer; Alan Winstanley

Madness chronology
| The Rise & Fall (1982) | Keep Moving (1984) | Mad Not Mad (1985) |

Singles from Keep Moving (UK)
- 1. "Michael Caine" Released: 30 January 1984; 2. "One Better Day" Released: 2 June 1984

Singles from Keep Moving (US)
- 1. "Wings of a Dove" Released: 20 August 1983 (UK; not issued as a single in the US); 2. "The Sun and the Rain" Released: 29 October 1983 (UK); 1984 (US)

Professional ratings
Review scores
| Source | Rating |
|---|---|
| AllMusic | 3/5 stars |
| Rolling Stone | 4/5 stars |
| Sounds | 2.5/5 stars |

Keep Moving is the fifth studio album by the English ska and pop band Madness. It was released in February 1984, and was their final album on the Stiff label. It's notably the band's last studio album to feature their keyboardist and founding member Mike Barson, before the band split in 1986.

Keep Moving peaked at No. 6 in the UK Albums Chart, and two singles from the album reached the Top 20 in the UK Singles Chart. It also reached number 109 on the US Billboard 200, their highest position for a studio album in the United States. The album received some good reviews, with Rolling Stone magazine giving the album four out of five stars, applauding the band's changing sound, and NME ranking it number 13 among the "Albums of the Year" for 1984.

The album was re-released in the United Kingdom in June 2010 on the Salvo/Union Square label, featuring bonus material. The reissue is a 2-CD set with the original album digitally remastered; the bonus content consists of associated singles, 12" mixes and B-sides. It also features liner notes written by comedian and Madness fan Phill Jupitus.

== Background ==
The band first started rehearsing and recording songs for the new album as early as February 1983, with "The Sun And The Rain" being debuted in the band's performance on The Tube that month. However, during rehearsals, keyboardist Mike Barson, who'd grown exhausted by the pressures of the group's stardom, disappeared on a camping holiday throughout Europe in a camper van, with his wife and dog for the rest of the summer. This held up the release of the next single, which would go on to be "Wings Of A Dove", and the rest of the album as well. He returned in August, a day before the band filmed the music video for "Wings of A Dove", and the band resumed work on the album after their tour in America ended in September.

However, on October 4th 1983, during rehearsals and discussions of a possible television series for the band, which was being written for them by Ben Elton and Richard Curtis, Barson then informed the band that he would not be able to take part, as he was tired of the music business and wanted to spend more time with his wife. They had recently relocated to Amsterdam. Barson agreed to finish recording the album Keep Moving and left after playing for the last time with the band at the Lyceum Ballroom on 21 December 1983. After leaving the band in January 1984, James Mackie took Barson's place, appearing with Madness on the US hit television show Saturday Night Live on 14 April 1984. After leaving the band, Barson returned to the UK for the filming of two music videos, "Michael Caine" and "One Better Day", as he had played on the tracks. He made his last recording with the band on the "One Better Day" single. Paul Carrack took Barson's place whilst the band toured America in early 1984.

The album takes its name from a phrase used repeatedly in the 1970 post-apocalyptic film The Bed Sitting Room.

The album cover was based on a suggestion by Stiff's boss Dave Robinson that it should reflect the forthcoming Olympics.

== North American version ==
This pressing has a different running order to the UK version and includes the singles "Wings of a Dove" and "The Sun and the Rain" in place of "Waltz Into Mischief" and "Time for Tea" (although the cassette and CD both include all 14 tracks). The version of "The Sun and the Rain" used here, and also issued as a single in North America, has an edited outro, reducing the length by some 12 seconds. A vinyl picture disc version, using the US/Canadian track listing, was also issued in the UK.

== Track listing ==
=== UK ===
Side one
| No. | Title | Writer(s) | Length |
|---|---|---|---|
| 1. | "Keep Moving" | Cathal Smyth, Chris Foreman, Graham McPherson | 3:33 |
| 2. | "Michael Caine" | Smyth, Daniel Woodgate | 3:37 |
| 3. | "Turning Blue" | McPherson, Foreman | 3:06 |
| 4. | "One Better Day" | McPherson, Mark Bedford | 4:06 |
| 5. | "March of the Gherkins" | Lee Thompson, Michael Barson | 3:30 |
| 6. | "Waltz into Mischief" | Smyth, McPherson | 3:36 |

Side two
| No. | Title | Writer(s) | Length |
|---|---|---|---|
| 7. | "Brand New Beat" | Thompson, Barson | 3:17 |
| 8. | "Victoria Gardens" | Smyth, Barson | 4:32 |
| 9. | "Samantha" | Thompson, Barson | 3:14 |
| 10. | "Time for Tea" | Thompson, Foreman | 3:08 |
| 11. | "Prospects" | Smyth, McPherson | 4:15 |
| 12. | "Give Me a Reason" | Thompson | 3:26 |
| Total length: | | | 43:18 |

=== US/CAN ===
Side one
| No. | Title | Writer(s) | Length |
|---|---|---|---|
| 1. | "Keep Moving" | Smyth, Foreman, McPherson | 3:33 |
| 2. | "Wings of a Dove" | Smyth, McPherson | 3:02 |
| 3. | "The Sun and the Rain" | Barson | 3:18 |
| 4. | "Brand New Beat" | Thompson, Barson | 3:17 |
| 5. | "March of the Gherkins" | Thompson, Barson | 3:30 |
| 6. | "Michael Caine" | Smyth, Woodgate | 3:37 |

Side two
| No. | Title | Writer(s) | Length |
|---|---|---|---|
| 7. | "Prospects" | Smyth, McPherson | 4:15 |
| 8. | "Victoria Gardens" | Smyth, Barson | 4:32 |
| 9. | "Samantha" | Thompson, Barson | 3:14 |
| 10. | "One Better Day" | McPherson, Bedford | 4:06 |
| 11. | "Give Me a Reason" | Thompson | 3:26 |
| 12. | "Turning Blue" | McPherson, Foreman | 3:06 |
| Total length: | | | 42:41 |

=== 2010 reissue ===
CD 1
The original album
- The first disc contains the twelve tracks from the original UK album version and four promo videos.

The promo videos

1. "Wings of a Dove"
2. "The Sun and the Rain"
3. "Michael Caine"
4. "One Better Day"

CD 2

The bonus tracks
| No. | Title | Writer(s) | Original release | Length |
|---|---|---|---|---|
| 13. | "Wings of a Dove" | Smyth, McPherson | Single A-side, 1983 | 3:00 |
| 14. | "Behind the 8 Ball" | Barson, Bedford, Foreman, McPherson, Smyth, Thompson, Woodgate | B-side of "Wings of a Dove" | 3:01 |
| 15. | "One's Second Thoughtlessness" | Thompson, Woodgate | B-side of "Wings of a Dove" 12" | 3:26 |
| 16. | "Wings of a Dove" (12" Blue Train Mix) | Smyth, McPherson | 12" A-side | 6:10 |
| 17. | "The Sun and the Rain" | Barson | Single A-side, 1983 | 3:28 |
| 18. | "Fireball XL5" | Thompson, Madness | B-side of "The Sun and the Rain" | 1:47 |
| 19. | "My Girl" (live at the Brighton Centre, March 1983) | Barson | B-side of "The Sun and the Rain" 12" | 2:55 |
| 20. | "The Sun and the Rain" (12" Extended Version) | Barson | 12" A-side | 4:42 |
| 21. | "Michael Caine" (12" Extended Version) | Smyth, Woodgate | 12" A-side | 4:13 |
| 22. | "If You Think There's Something" | Barson | B-side of "Michael Caine" | 3:09 |
| 23. | "Guns" | McPherson | B-side of "One Better Day" | 3:16 |
| 24. | "Sarah" | Thompson, Madness | B-side of "One Better Day" 12" | 3:45 |
| 25. | "Victoria Gardens" (remix) | Smyth, Barson | B-side of "One Better Day" 12" | 3:54 |
| Total length: | | | | 46:44 |

== Personnel ==
Madness

- Graham "Suggs" McPherson – lead vocals
- Mike Barson – keyboards, harmonica
- Chris Foreman – guitar
- Mark Bedford – bass guitar
- Lee Thompson – saxophones
- Dan Woodgate – drums
- Cathal Smyth – backing vocals, trumpet, lead vocals on "Michael Caine" and "Victoria Gardens"

Additional personnel

- General Public (Dave Wakeling and Ranking Roger) – backing vocals on "Waltz Into Mischief" and "Victoria Gardens"
- Afrodiziak (Caron Wheeler, Claudia Fontaine and Naomi Thompson) – backing vocals on "Michael Caine"
- Michael Caine – voice on "Michael Caine"
- Luís Jardim – percussion
- The TKO Horns (Dave Pleurs, Alan Whetton, Jim Patterson and Brian Maurice) – horns on "Keep Moving"
- David Bedford – string arrangements

Technical personnel

- Clive Langer – producer
- Alan Winstanley – producer
- Carb – engineer
- Gavin Greenaway – engineer
- Matt Butler – engineer
- Steve Churchyard – engineer
- Jim Russell – mixing
- Phil Tennant – mixing
- Denis Blackham – mastering
- Tony Duffy – photography
- Matthew Sztumpf – management

2010 reissue personnel

- Creighton Steel Sounds – steel band on "Wings of a Dove"
- Miguel Barradas – steel band arrangement on "Wings of a Dove"
- The Pentecostal First Born Church of the Living God – choir on "Wings of a Dove"
- David Bedford – string arrangements on "The Sun and the Rain"
- Dick Cuthell – trumpet on "The Sun and the Rain"; flugelhorn and cornet on "My Girl" (live version)
- Cal Verney – cello on "My Girl" (live version)
- Suzanne Rosenfeld – viola on "My Girl" (live version)
- Jonathan Kahan – violin on "My Girl" (live version)
- Nick Parker – violin on "My Girl" (live version)
- Gary Barnacle – saxophone on "Victoria Gardens" (remix)
- Peter Thoms – trombone on "Victoria Gardens" (remix)
- Luke Tunney – trumpet on "Victoria Gardens" (remix)
- Madness – producer on "Behind the 8 Ball", "One's Second Thoughtlessness" and "Fireball XL5"
- Ian Horne – producer on "Fireball XL5" and "Sarah"
- Mark O'Donoughue – engineer on "One's Second Thoughtlessness"
- Tim Turan – remastering
- Martin "Cally" Callomon – art direction, design
- The Stiff Art Department – original graphic design
- Nik Rose – artwork ("re-jigging and fettling")
- Phill Jupitus – liner notes

== Chart performance ==
| Chart (1984) | Peak position |
|---|---|
| Canadian Albums Chart | 66 |
| German Albums Chart | 47 |
| Swedish Albums Chart | 29 |
| UK Albums Chart | 6 |
| US Billboard Hot 200 | 109 |

== Certifications and sales ==
| Region | Certification | Certified units/sales |
|---|---|---|
| United Kingdom (BPI) | Silver | 60,000^{^} |
^{^} Shipments figures based on certification alone.

== See also ==
- List of albums released in 1984
- Madness' discography
