= Take It or Leave It (1981 film) =

- Original poster
- Directed by: Dave Robinson
- Written by: Philip McDonald; David Robinson; Madness
- Produced by: Dave Robinson
- Starring: Suggs; Mike Barson; Lee Thompson; Chris Foreman; Mark Bedford; Daniel Woodgate; Chas Smash
- Edited by: Michael Ellis
- Music by: Madness; The Four Tops
- Distributed by: Nutty Stiff Productions
- Release date: October 14, 1981
- Running time: 82 minutes
- Country: United Kingdom
- Language: English
- Budget: £400,000

Take It or Leave It is a 1981 British documentary/drama/comedy film directed by Dave Robinson, about the formation of the British ska/pop band Madness. It stars the members of the band and was financed by themselves.

Chris Foreman called it "a semi-serious film, more a documentary."

In 2026 the film was remastered by the British Film Institute and re-released theatrically in Britain.

== Plot ==
The film begins in Camden Town, London, on a grey day in January 1976. Three friends, Lee Thompson, Chris Foreman and Mike Barson, start to play music together. Along the way their band suffers numerous arguments and changes in their line-up before finding success in the final scene, with a full piece Madness going out to a packed, screaming arena.

== Cast (as themselves) ==
- Graham McPherson / Suggs
- Mike Barson / Barzo
- Lee Thompson / El Thommo
- Chris Foreman / Chrissy Boy
- Mark Bedford / Bedders
- Daniel Woodgate / Woody
- Carl Smyth / Chas Smash

== Production ==
=== Development ===
Madness had its origins in a group formed in 1976, being renamed Madness in 1979, the year of the release of the band's first album, One Step Beyond.... The album was very successful as was its follow up Absolutely, and the band had nine hit singles in a row. According to Daniel Woodgate, "We thought, ‘Well, we’ve done it all now, let’s make a film of our story'."

Suggs said "We just thought a film was a natural step as our early years were so dependent on our visual stuff, which is almost as important as the music. "

The film's budget of £400,000 was paid with £250,000 from Stiff Records with the rest paid for by the band and their manager. According to Suggs, "The money came from the first big royalty cheque we ever received, so we thought that the best thing would be to invest it in something like a film, rather than just blow it all. It was a great opportunity to show the way we were in the early days and how we’d changed."

The film was directed by the owner of Madness label Stiff Records, Dave Robinson, who had never made a feature before but had directed some of the band's music videos, notably "Baggy Trousers" and "One Step Beyond". "The band’s videos were getting a lot of attention and they’d already proved how good they were in front of the camera," said Robinson. "We also thought they had a good story to tell that you couldn’t get over in a three- or four-minute video clip."

"It was meant to be about a bunch of ordinary people who form a band and eventually make a record and shows that anyone can do it," said Suggs. "It was about us as people more than us as part of the music industry."

Robinson later said:

We'd talked about a film a couple of times in the past, but the band’s schedule had always been so tight that it had seemed out of the question. Then, March turned out to be much looser. We sat down and discussed it in mid-February. We were going to try something fancy but eventually decided on something realistic. I’m against the one-sided thinking that is generally the rule when a director makes a film. It should be a mutual undertaking with me latching myself onto the band and helping them to make it happen.

David Robinson took interviews with the band; these formed the basis of the storyline, which used their thirty favourite episodes. There was never a finished script - scenes were heavily improvised.

=== Shooting ===
Filming took six weeks, starting 9 March 1981, just before the group left on a tour to Asia. Many of the locations used were ones where the dramatised events originally happened.

Film from the first four days of the shoot was overexposed in the development lab which necessitated reshoots.

"Some of the acting is hysterical," said Woodgate. "Mike and Lee look relaxed, like they belong in front of a camera, but acting was never something I particularly wanted to do."

Robinson said "a lot of the real spirit of Madness was probably lost by the crew not capturing the first take. You’d find that on the first take – the inspirational one – the guy didn’t have his focus together or the sound man had his machine off. The crew weren’t interested in what we were doing."

The editor Mike Ellis recalled "The script consisted of five half pages and it was all improvised and great fun to cut because we were inventing much of the film in the cutting room. It was shot with two 16mm cameras and blown up to 35mm."

== Release ==
The film was released in October 1981. It was accompanied by a 34-date tour to promote the film along with the album Seven and the single Shut Up.

== Reception ==
According to Mark Bedford, "the film had no script, its stars had never acted and its producer/director had never masterminded a film before. It sounds like the makings of a complete disaster but it turned out as we’d all hoped it would – just a down-to-earth story of how some honest guys from north London got out of a rut and made the big time."

McPherson himself as initially disappointed with the film, viewing it as "prosaic and boring", although he has since revised his view.

=== Critical ===
The Guardian called it a "likeable account" which "asks no real questions but it pleasantly unpompous about the early years."

The Cambridge Evening News, reviewing a VHS release of the movie in 1984, felt the film had been overshadowed by the video compilation Complete Madness which was "unfair on Take It or Leave It which is equally entertaining, though in a different way... the acting is not as atrocious as you might expect... it is very funny, and pleasantly so."

Madness biographer John Reed argued "While its theatrical success was limited, the film stands as testimony to both the ferocious, unquestioning belief of Dave Robinson in the Madness idea; and to the band’s ability to rise to the occasion with their trademark mix of good humour, streetwise suss and an uncanny ability to entertain."

Reviewing the film upon its re-release in 2026, The Guardian's Peter Bradshaw gave Take It or Leave It four stars out of five, describing it as "unexpectedly revealing, vividly atmospheric, often funny and alarming" and calling it "an almost Loachian exercise in social realism". Bradshaw also states that the film "doesn’t give you much in the way of context, musical or otherwise" compared to how a feature film might dramatise the same material: "It's just about Madness, and interestingly that feels more authentic than a film with lots of archival references." The same newspaper's Stevie Chick also praised the film, saying: "Throughout, there is a sense that this beloved pop-cultural institution might easily have never happened, for all the everyday, low-drama reasons so many bands implode: internal ructions, the interminable juggle of creative ambitions and real-life responsibilities – and the eternal struggle to find a decent drummer. When the lineup finally coalesces and the artists formerly known as the North London Invaders rehearse as Madness for the first time, it makes for electrifying cinema."

=== Box office ===
"A couple of distributors showed an interest but they got cold feet," said Robinson. "Consequently not many people got to see it and it didn’t exactly make its way into multiplexes all over the country."

In 1982 it was reported in Sight and Sound that the film's commercial performance was "Not quite up to expectation. Madness, it was discovered, had a younger audience than was thought and a re-release is being negotiated aimed at this youth audience."

The movie lost considerable amounts of money for Madness and Stiff Records.

== Soundtrack ==
The soundtrack contains live and studio recorded Madness songs from the band's first two albums, One Step Beyond... and Absolutely, various B-sides, covers, an early song never issued on record ("Sunshine Voice"), and several songs from their then-new album titled 7.

The soundtrack album was not released until 2013, when the film was released on DVD.

== Sources ==
- Mojo Special Limited Edition, The Ska Explosion!, "Padded Cells" by Johnny Black.
- Total Madness by George Marshall.
- Reed, John (2009). The nutty sound : the story of Madness. Omnibus.
