= The Sun and the Rain =

1983 single by Madness

Single by Madness

from the album Keep Moving (US) Non-album single (UK)
- B-side: "Fireball XL5" / "Time for Tea" (USA/Canada)
- Released: 29 October 1983
- Recorded: 1983
- Genre: Ska; soul; sophisti-pop
- Length: 3:28 / 3:18 (US/Canada)
- Label: Stiff
- Songwriter: Mike Barson
- Producers: Clive Langer; Alan Winstanley

Madness singles chronology
"Wings of a Dove" (1983)	"The Sun and the Rain" (1983)	"Michael Caine" (1984)

"The Sun and the Rain" is a single by the English ska and pop band Madness. It was released in 1983 as a stand-alone single and in 1984 it was included on the American/Canadian version of their fifth studio album Keep Moving. The single spent 10 weeks on the UK singles chart, peaking at number 5. The song was also their last to ever enter the US Billboard Hot 100 charts, peaking as high as No. 72 on that following chart in 1984.

"The Sun and the Rain" was the last Madness single written solely by Mike Barson until 2009's "Sugar and Spice". It was also the last original release of theirs to reach the UK top 10 until "Lovestruck" in 1999.

== Background ==
The lyrics were written by Barson in a cab on his way to AIR Studios in early 1983, where the band were recording Keep Moving at the time. They were inspired by Barson's love of weather and nature itself. The song was first premiered in the band's live performance on The Tube on February 18th, 1983. The original arrangement was slightly different, featuring a keyboard solo instead of a guitar solo, and some different lyrics.

== Music video ==
The music video for the song shows Madness performing in a rainy street, with a couple of references to Christmastime and the holiday seasons. Toward the end they are joined by a number of Madness fans who join in the dancing. An introductory scene shows the band entering 'Holts' shoe shop in Camden Town, since renamed British Boot Company. There are also scenes showing the band dressed in red with umbrella hats, supposedly wreaking havoc inside Suggs' ear, and shots of Lee Thompson running around with a rocket strapped to his back, a reference to the single's b-side.

== Cover painting ==
The cover is a detail from the painting The Storm by the French artist Narcisse Virgilio Díaz de la Peña. Painted in 1871, it can be seen in the National Gallery in London.

== Critical reception ==
Upon its release, Peter Martin of Smash Hits praised "The Sun and the Rain" as "a belter" and commented, "The song trundles along merrily, carried by a jaunty pub piano that gives the song a slightly off-beat, light-hearted feel. There's also a touch of a Beatles-ish string section thrown in for good measure." Robin Smith of Record Mirror noted that it "boasts some particularly plaintive vocals and a neat shuffling back-up" and felt it is "a shade more traditional than some of their previous works".

Debbi Voller of Number One described it as "the Madness we've all come to love" and added that it "goes like all the others yet still manages to sound different". Julie Burchill of NME commented, "With their beer barrel rhythms and cosmic visions Madness are the one and only heirs to the Small Faces, though overblown mediocrity like this makes me think the lads are squandering their inheritance. Childlikeness, cosmic vision and Cockney cheer are very hard to weld together successfully."

== Track listing ==
- 7" single
1. "The Sun and the Rain" - 3:28
2. "Fireball XL 5" - 1:44
- 12" single
1. "The Sun and the Rain" (extended version) - 4:35
2. "Fireball XL 5" - 1:44
3. "My Girl" (live) - 3:10

== Charts ==
Chart (1983–84)	Peak position
UK Singles Chart	5
US Billboard Hot 100	72
