= Roy Boulter =

English drummer

Roy Boulter (born 2 July 1964, Liverpool) was the English drummer in the Liverpool-based pop group The Farm. He joined the band in 1987, enjoying success with the number one album, Spartacus, and hits such as "Groovy Train" and "All Together Now". The Farm re-formed (despite never formally splitting up), occasionally touring and playing festivals. In 2011 the band provided the nucleus of The Justice Tonight Band, joined by Mick Jones (The Clash), Pete Wylie (The Mighty Wah!) and Andrew Davitt (Johnny Boy, Paul Weller, Manic Street Preachers, B.A.D.). The band was formed to raise awareness about the injustice surrounding the Hillsborough disaster - Boulter and Farm lead-singer Peter Hooton were both present at the tragedy. The Justice Tonight Band toured the UK and Europe (supporting the Stone Roses) spreading the message about Hillsborough and the twenty-three years of injustice endured by the families and victims of the tragedy.

Boulter has written extensively for television, including Brookside, Hollyoaks, The Bill and for the second - BAFTA-winning - series of Jimmy McGovern's drama The Street ("Two Families" starring Lorraine Ashbourne, Gina McKee and a pre-Doctor Who Matt Smith - in his first lead role). Boulter wrote for the BBC soap opera EastEnders in 2011 and 2012 as well as co-writing the Radio 2 pilot Shout to the Top (along with former Sleeper lead vocalist, Louise Wener). Previously, he had written two other radio dramas – Lifestyles of the Trapped and Cabbaged and Shanghaied and Shipless.

He is a co-director of Hurricane Films along with business partner Sol Papadopoulos, and the pair produced their feature film Under the Mud, followed by the Terence Davies documentary Of Time and the City (for which the duo received a BAFTA nomination).

Hurricane Films produced two further Davies films; Sunset Song starring Peter Mullan and Agyness Deyn (world premiere at the Toronto Film Festival), and A Quiet Passion starring Cynthia Nixon, Jennifer Ehle and Keith Carradine (Berlin Film Festival). These were followed by A Prayer Before Dawn directed by Jean-Stéphane Sauvaire, starring Joe Cole (Cannes 2017). In 2018, Boulter and Hurricane Films produced Sometimes Always Never, starring Bill Nighy, Sam Riley, Alice Lowe and Jenny Agutter, written by Frank Cottrell Boyce and directed by Carl Hunter (London 2018). Most recently Hurricane produced The Last Bus with Timothy Spall and Phyllis Logan - directed by Gillies McKinnon, which is due for release in 2021.

Boulter was appointed as Creative Director The Museum of Liverpool's Immersive exhibition - ‘Kicking And Screaming’ – a film about the city's passion for football. Hurricane Films went on to win the tenders for two further immersives at the museum - an exploration of the early lives and career of The Beatles, made in collaboration with Apple Corps Ltd and ‘The Power And The Glory?’ an interpretation of how the growth and decline of the British Empire created and then almost destroyed the city of Liverpool.

Boulter is a founder member and director of The Jack Jones Trust – a collaboration set up between film-makers and Trade Unions to produce documentaries.

In 2025, Boulter made his directorial debut adapting the work of spoken word artist ‘Roy’ (PJ Smith) - a collection of brutal but funny short stories. The feature-length feature film ‘Algorithm Party' takes its title from the book which was published by Rough Trade in 2020. Algorithm Party was selected by the Girona Film festival - but the festival was subsequently cancelled due to the Valencia floods.

In May 2025, a Screen Daily exclusive announced that Boulter will be directing his debut scripted feature (which he also wrote) called 'Fetch' - a musical about dog walkers and their pets. The cast includes Robert Bathurst, Alice Lowe, Lee Mack, Sue Johnston, Ray Fearon, Dorothy Atkinson, Andrew Schofield and Celyn Jones. The film, due to be shot on Merseyside in 2026, will be produced by Liverpool-based Hurricane Films.

He supports Liverpool F.C. and was a founder member of The Spirit Of Shankly football supporters union.
