= Jon Morter =

English radio DJ (born 1974)

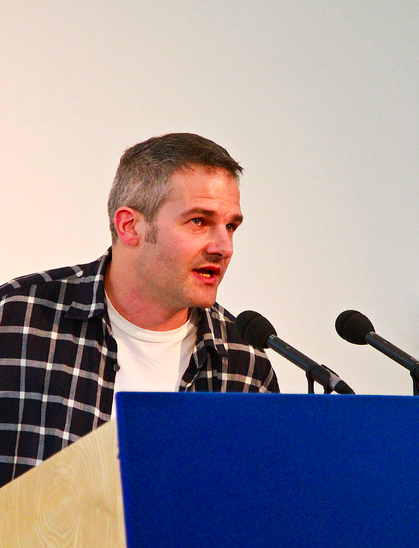
- Born: 4 October 1974 (age 52); Chelmsford, England
- Occupation: DJ
- Spouse: Tracy Hayden (m. 2004–2013) (divorced)

Jonathan Morter (born 4 October 1974) is an English radio DJ, social media pioneer and campaigner. He helped launch various internet campaigns. He launched the Condescending Corporate Brand Page, a page that harshly ridicules corporate social media techniques.

== Campaigns ==
In 2002, an early internet fan campaign to get John Otway another chart hit in time for his 50th birthday, saw Otway's single "Bunsen Burner" reach number 9 in 2002 without being stocked by Entertainment UK-associated retailers like Woolworths. In the 2013 documentary Rock and Roll's Greatest Failure: Otway the Movie, Morter said that the Otway campaign had influenced him to create his own, with the added benefit that by 2008 people did not have to go to the shops to physically buy the records.

In 2023, Morter was one of the original team behind the StopTheTories.Vote tactical voting website later fronted by Carol Vorderman

=== Rick Astley vs Alexandra Burke (2008) ===
In 2008, Morter launched a campaign to make Rick Astley's "Never Gonna Give You Up" reach the top of the British Christmas chart. Also known as the "Ultimate Rickroll" (in reference to Rickrolling), the campaign was started on Facebook on 1 December 2008, in an attempt to make the song the 2008 Christmas number one in the UK. The campaign's purpose was to stop the winner of The X Factor from gaining the Christmas number one spot, thereby ending the show's chain of success. The year's X Factor winner at the time was Alexandra Burke with her winning song being a cover of Leonard Cohen's "Hallelujah".

The group attracted nearly 30,000 people in its first week. Campaigners were encouraged to get as many people as possible to download the song from iTunes between 15 and 20 December 2008. The song peaked at number 73 however this was later found to be a deliberate lowering of the song's place (having reached number three a week before it came to its finish) due to the company's [Sony] belief that "the songs [sic] ranking was ridiculous and rigging a contest was unfair on other artists".

=== Rage Against the Machine vs Joe McElderry (2009) ===
In 2009, The Morters tried on a bigger scale, launching a campaign to prevent that year's X Factor winner Joe McElderry from becoming the Christmas number one with his cover of the song "The Climb". They proposed instead the Rage Against the Machine song "Killing in the Name" by establishing a Facebook account named "Rage Against the Machine for Christmas No 1". Jon Morter told London Metro that he had learned how the system worked through Rick Astley's bid. He said: "What I learned from that was how the charts work a little bit really, and what you can get away with. So when this year came around I just thought 'let's have another go'. If anything, last year was fun, it was just a good bit of fun I think. This year it has gone stratospheric".

The grassroots movement was successful in preventing McElderry attaining the top spot on Christmas week as Rage Against the Machine outsold McElderry, and became the UK Christmas number one.

=== BBC 6 Music campaign (2010) ===
In January 2010, Morter, after hearing about news that the demise of the music station BBC 6 Music was near, and that the station was being scrapped by BBC management, successfully campaigned against its imminent closure by kickstarting the 'Save 6 Music' Facebook group networking with over 180,000 members subscribing.

=== The Rolling Stones album (2010) ===
In May 2010, he contributed to the success of the re-issue of the Rolling Stones' 1972 album Exile on Main St., collecting more than a million members. On 23 May 2010, Exile went straight to the top of the UK Albums Chart.

=== Nirvana vs Little Mix vs Alex Day vs Military Wives vs Lou Monte (2011) ===
In 2011, Morter helped the campaign against X Factor winners Little Mix and their cover of "Cannonball" from becoming Christmas number one by supporting Nirvana's song "Smells Like Teen Spirit".

The Nirvana song made it to No. 11 on the 2011 UK Christmas Singles Chart. However, Little Mix themselves were beaten by another song, "Wherever You Are" by the Military Wives (which had the support of British broadcaster Chris Evans), although Little Mix's single was released a week earlier than usual and had already been number one the week before. Nirvana was also beaten by two rival campaigns; "Dominick the Donkey", a 1960 novelty single by Lou Monte which was championed by BBC Radio 1 DJ Chris Moyles, and "Forever Yours" by unsigned YouTube artist Alex Day.

=== The Justice Collective (2012) ===
In October 2012, Morter was invited by Peter Hooton of the Farm to join the Justice Collective, a fund-raising record raising money for the various charities associated with the Hillsborough disaster. The song took the Christmas number 1 position for 2012 in the UK, beating 2012 X Factor winner James Arthur, who was number one the previous week, and a host of novelty songs from acts including the £1 Fish Man, and the Eddie Stobart Truckers.

=== AC/DC – "Highway to Hell" (2013) ===
Morter initiated a campaign hoping to aid "Highway to Hell" by AC/DC to reach number one on the 2013 UK Christmas Singles Chart, as a tribute to the band's 40th anniversary, as the band has never ever topped the British chart. The single made it to number 4 on the UK Christmas chart, the band's highest-ever UK singles chart placing, but could not prevent The X Factor-related single "Skyscraper" by tenth season winner Sam Bailey from making it to number one. Alongside the campaign, funds were raised from donations to a JustGiving page which went to the charity Feel Yourself, to raise awareness about the importance of self-checking for breast and testicular cancer.

=== Rik Mayall - "Noble England" (2014) ===
Prior to the 2010 World Cup in South Africa, Jon's then-wife Tracy was asked to take promotional photos for the forthcoming football song "Noble England" by Rik Mayall. This was Tracy's first job as a professional photographer, and alongside Morter spent the day working with Mayall on location at Leeds Castle in Kent. On Mayall's death just prior to the 2014 FIFA World Cup, Morter began a campaign to chart the song in time for the tournament. "Noble England" peaked at number 7 on the UK chart, making it the highest charting football song in the UK during the 2014 World Cup. Profits from the sales of the song were donated to charities dedicated to head injuries.

=== The Peace Collective - "All Together Now" (2014) ===
In October 2014, many members of the Justice Collective (including Morter) reconvened as 'The Peace Collective', to record the Farm's 1990 hit "All Together Now" in aid of the British Red Cross and the Shorncliffe Trust. The new track featured a backing choir of schoolboy footballers from the Premier League and German Bundesliga plus a number of music acts including Clean Bandit, Engelbert Humperdinck, the Proclaimers, Gorgon City, Suzi Quatro, Jona Lewie, Alexandra Burke, Julian Lennon, Paul Potts, Jane McDonald, David Gray, Gabrielle, Mick Jones, Holly Johnson, and many more. The track was released 14 December 2014 and reached number 70 on the UK Singles Chart.

=== Eagles of Death Metal - "Save a Prayer" (2015) ===
Following the November 2015 Paris attacks, a campaign was created by Morter with the intention of getting the band's cover of the Duran Duran song "Save a Prayer" to number one on the UK Singles Chart. The campaign was endorsed by Duran Duran, who promised to donate their proceeds from the sale to charity. The song ultimately peaked at number 53 on the chart dated the week after the attack. It peaked at number 1 on the iTunes Rock Chart in 11 countries including the UK and France.

=== Wham! - "Last Christmas" (2017) ===
Upon hearing of the death of George Michael, Morter created a campaign on Boxing Day 2016 to chart the Wham! song "Last Christmas" aiming for the 2017 Christmas No. 1 single. The Facebook page amassed 34,000 fans, with the song peaking at No. 1 on the iTunes, Amazon, 7Digital, and Google Play download charts, yet the song ultimately peaked at No. 2, beaten to the top position by multiple versions of Ed Sheeran's "Perfect". The Facebook campaign page remained open and active with the song peaking at No. 3 in December 2018, No. 3 again in December 2019, then finally at No. 1 in January 2021, December 2022, then Christmas No.1 in 2023 and 2024.

=== The Kunts - "Boris Johnson Is a Fucking Cunt" (2020) ===
In December 2020, Morter was approached by his comedy act friend Kunt on behalf of his newly formed punk band, the Kunts, to assist with their attempt for the Christmas number one single with a short song about Prime Minister Boris Johnson called "Boris Johnson Is a Fucking Cunt". The band were backed in the race by Black Mirror's Charlie Brooker, the Wonder Stuff's Miles Hunt, Ginger Wildheart, as well as Glen Matlock of the Sex Pistols.

The song about Boris Johnson was revealed on BBC Radio 1 by Vick Hope and Katie Thistleton on 20 December 2020.

During the show, the presenters did not mention the song's title or play it on air because of the offensive language in it, stating: "Now at 19 we've got a track about Boris Johnson that has so many bad words in it we can't play it on daytime Radio 1." The record was a new entry at number 19, with LadBaby at number 1, climbing to number 8 the next day. On 23 December 2020, it was reported that a number of bookmakers had put odds on the record being the Christmas number one at 8/1, after it had become the second most downloaded song on iTunes and Amazon. The song ultimately reached number 5 on the Christmas chart, after accumulating 45,119 sales, and unlike many of the other Christmas campaign singles (such as rivals LadBaby) made the Official Audio Streaming Chart, and number 1 on the Spotify UK Viral Chart as well.

=== Asian Dub Foundation featuring Stewart Lee - "Comin' Over Here" (2021) ===
In September 2020, Asian Dub Foundation (a political band from London who had a top 40 hit with "Buzzin'" in 1998) released a song called "Comin' Over Here", which was based on a sketch from Stewart Lee's Comedy Vehicle about the then UKIP party leader Paul Nuttall. In December 2020, Morter teamed up with Lee and Asian Dub Foundation to campaign to chart the song in time for the chart published by the Official Charts Company on 31 December 2020, thereby making the record the 'Brexit Day Number One'. On 1 January 2021, Asian Dub Foundation and Stewart Lee charted on the Official Chart Company's Top 100 singles chart, when "Comin' Over Here" debuted at No. 65, the week's highest new entry and No. 1 on the Official Sales Chart. The accompanying video achieved over 1 million views.

=== The Kunts - "Boris Johnson Is STILL a Fucking Cunt" (2021) ===
In October 2021, Morter and friend Kunt met up at The Norton public house in Cold Norton, Essex, to discuss the possibility of writing a book on their previous chart campaigns. This meeting ended up with an entirely different outcome, to release another Christmas single by following the rules of a 1989 book called The Manual (How to Have a Number One the Easy Way) by the KLF. The song was inspired by the 'novelty' pop single "Doctorin' the Tardis" by the Timelords (a pseudonym of the KLF), with one of the accompanying videos being a pastiche of the said Timelords video. The Kunts released numerous videos for the project, one portraying a 1970s Top of the Pops performance where Morter appears as an extra. The song reached No. 5 on the Official Chart Company's Top 100 singles chart, and No. 1 on the Official Rock & Metal Singles Chart.

== Awards and nominations ==
In 2009, Morter was picked by the BBC in their list of nominations for "Men of the Year" Awards from December 2009 for his Rage Against the Machine vs Joe McElderry campaign.

In 2010, he won the 'Defender of the Faith Award' at the 2010 Metal Hammer Golden Gods. He also won the 3 Mobile Award for 'Social Media High of the Year', and was nominated for the 2010 Revolution "Marketer of the Year" award.

Wired magazine included Morter and his wife Tracy in their "Top 100 Influencers", placing at #85 on the Wired list.

== Personal life ==
Morter married Tracy Hayden in 2004. The couple divorced in 2013.
