= Spartacus (The Farm album) =

Studio album by the Farm
- Released: 4 March 1991
- Recorded: 1987, 1990
- Studios: Mayfair, London; Liquidator, London; Fairview, Hull
- Genres: Baggy, dance-rock
- Length: 45:23
- Label: Produce
- Producers: Graham "Suggs" McPherson; Paul Heaton; Stan Cullimore

The Farm chronology
Spartacus (1991)	Love See No Colour (1992)

Singles from Spartacus
- 1. "Groovy Train" Released: 20 August 1990; 2. "All Together Now" Released: 26 November 1990; 3. "Don't Let Me Down" Released: 22 April 1991

Spartacus is the debut studio album by British rock band the Farm, released on 4 March 1991 through Produce Records. Following a variety of member changes and single releases, the band solidified their line-up in 1987; after a record deal fell through, they opted to start their own label, Produce Records. They recorded the bulk of their debut album in London in 1990 with former Madness frontman Graham "Suggs" McPherson as producer; one track from 1987 was produced by the Housemartins members Paul Heaton and Stan Cullimore. Spartacus is a baggy and dance-rock album that takes influence from the work of Buzzcocks, the Clash and the Jam.

Spartacus received generally positive reviews from music critics. Although some of them were split on the album's songwriting quality, while others praised it in the context of the baggy scene. The album topped the charts in the United Kingdom. "Groovy Train" was released as its lead single in August 1990, followed by the second single "All Together Now" in November 1990. "Don't Let Me Down" appeared in April 1991, and was promoted with a supporting slot for Happy Mondays in June 1991 at the Elland Road football stadium in Leeds. They then toured the United States with Big Audio Dynamite and Downtown Science. NME and Vox included the album on their lists of the year's best 50 releases.

== Background ==
Influenced by the likes of punk rock acts such as the Clash and the Jam, Peter Hooton decided to become a musician, initially picking up bass briefly before focusing on singing instead. He joined his friend's brother's band after their frontman failed to show up to a rehearsal. The death of John Lennon, coupled with anger towards the Tory party following a speech by leader Margaret Thatcher, inspired Hooton to become a writer. He started the fanzine The End, which chronicled his poems as well as football news, music and politics. This helped Hooton grow in his confidence as a writer, which he had shied away from after being ridiculed by his school's English teacher. Hooton's band soon became directionless and he was looking to form another band; through a mutual friend, he met Steve Grimes, guitarist for local punk rock act the Excitements. After an audition, Hooton joined the Excitements, replacing Martin Dunbar. The rest of the band consisted of bassist Phil Stephenson, drummer Neil Campbell and dancer Thomas. Around the same time, Phil Jones of zine Time for Action and Mick Potter started contributing to The End when it became popular throughout Liverpool. Hooton played his debut show with the Excitements in 1982 at a friend's party. Despite him wanting to keep The End and the Excitements as separate entities, readers of the zine started attending the band's shows.

Several more local gigs ensued, with them changing their name to the Farm, reflecting that they rehearsed on a farm plot in Lydiate. The band's punk rock sound was out of place in the post-punk scene in Liverpool, featuring the likes of Echo & the Bunnymen, the Teardrop Explodes and Wah!. Andy McVann, who had seen Hooton's first show, joined the Farm as their drummer. Positive reviews from the music press earned the band their first John Peel session in April 1983, where they performed "Information Man", "No Man's Land" and "Memories". In February 1984, they did another Peel session, playing "Hearts & Minds", "Too Late", "Same Old Story" and "Somewhere". In between these sessions, the band went through multiple bassists until Carl Hunter joined. They then appeared on Oxford Road Show, where they met Graham "Suggs" McPherson and Chas Smash, both formerly of Madness. Around this time, the Farm had little money, surviving off residuals from the Peel sessions. A friend of the Farm's was manning the doors at a Madness show and said the Farm were in need of help. Suggs, who had heard one of the Farm's Peel sessions, let them record some demos at Madness's studio on Caledonian Road, London for free. Suggs produced their debut single, "Hearts & Minds", later in the year. Simon Moran, who later founded SJM Concerts, became one of the band's early supporters, helping to organise shows for them.

Sometime later, a brass section consisting of Anthony Evans, Steve Levy, George Maher and John Melvin was brought into the band's line-up, shifting their sound towards Northern soul. McVann was involved in a fatal car crash in October 1986; the Farm almost broke up when the brass section left after this. In 1987, Roy Bulter filled in McVann's role, and second guitarist Keith Mullen and keyboardist Benjamin Leach were added to the line-up. Bill Drummond, one half of the KLF, who was well versed in the Liverpool scene and the Farm's activities, wanted to become their manager after meeting Hooton in a bar, but ultimately did not. After seeing one of the Farm's performances, Happy Mondays supported them in Liverpool in May 1987. The Farm then went on tour with the Housemartins; they almost signed to the Housemartins' Stan Cullimore's label Fair Play Committee, but the deal fell through when Cullimore decided to write children's books instead. In discussions, Moran wanted 20% of the proposed £25,000 signing bonus, claiming that as their manager he should be paid more; Hooton remarked that they considered him an equal, not a superior. Moran parted ways with the band when the deal collapsed. "Body and Soul", their next single, was released in 1988 and saw a shift to synth-pop. In an attempt to draw more attention to the band, Hooton concocted a music scene under the name Urchin Rock that would include them and fellow Liverpools bands Rain and the Real People. Hooton then convinced popular journalists to cover the faux movement; it received significant press coverage, but did not further the careers of any of the acts grouped under it.

== Label and recording ==
In late 1989, Paul McKenna, who had been the Farm's merchandise aid, and Hooton had a meeting at the former's flat. McKenna introduced Hooton to Barney Moores, a fan of theirs and son of Littlewoods Pools owner John Moores. Barney Moores had spare money to invest in a business and was interested in helping the band; Hooton told him that £25,000 would cover the cost of an album and two singles. Hooton then contacted Kevin Sampson, who they previously met when the latter was shooting a film some months prior. He had connections around London and was an associate of Suggs. In January 1990, Sampson was asked to become their manager, eventually agreeing to become co-manager with Suggs. Shortly afterwards, Sampson travelled from London to Liverpool to set up a meeting. The outcome of that meeting saw the formation of the record label Produce Records with Ian Croft, Wayne Chad, Moors and McKenna as business partners. The label's offices were located in the Holmes Building in Liverpool; its releases would be distributed by Kent-based company Pinnacle. Part of the money the band received was used to purchase a sampler to expand their musical style. Sampson drafted up an eight-page plan that Hooton referred to as "how to get the Farm into the Top 40". The band hired Anglo Plugging to promote them on the radio, booking agent Martin Horn of International Talent Booking and press officer John Best of Savage & Best Management, and planned to record at Madness' studio. Hooton admitted that they "didn't know anything" and trusted Sampson's judgement.

Shortly afterwards, the band began working on a cover of "Stepping Stone" (1966) by Paul Revere & the Raiders as their next single. Sampson felt they needed an outside influence to aid them, and proposed Terry Farley. Around this time, Farley was growing in popularity as a DJ in the acid house movement, and was formerly a subscriber to The End. Farley, serving as mixing engineer, suggested the band slow the track down and incorporate samples from "The Power" (1990) by Snap!. Though the song stalled at number 59 on the UK Singles Chart, the single received positive press coverage. The Farm tried to record "Higher & Higher" soon after, but were not satisfied with the sound, and decided to work on "Groovy Train" with engineer Mark Saunders instead as their next single. They had played a psychedelic version of "Groovy Train" for a Peel session; for the released version, Farley moved Mullen's guitar from the middle eight to the intro section and added a loop from "The Gas Face" (1989) by 3rd Bass. Suggs produced nearly every track that would feature on Spartacus, save for "Tell the Story", which had been recorded in 1987 and was produced by Cullimore and Housemartins bandmate Paul Heaton. "Hearts & Minds", "How Long", "Sweet Inspiration", "Higher & Higher", "Don't Let Me Down", "Very Emotional" and "All Together Now" were recorded at Mayfair Studios in London in October and November 1990, while "Groovy Train" and "Family of Man" were recorded at Liquidator Studios and "Tell the Story" was recorded at Fairview Recording Studio in Hull. Kevin Petri engineered the majority of the tracks, except for "Groovy Train" (done by Gary Wilkinson) and "All Together Now" (done by Noel Rafferty). Saunders mixed "Groovy Train" at the Konk studio in London; the majority of the songs were mixed at Westside Studios in London, while "All Together Now" was done at Mayfair and "Family of Man" and "Tell the Story" were remixed at E-Zee, also based in London. Paula David, who was a session vocalist that Suggs knew, and Pete Wylie contributed backing vocals throughout the recordings.

== Composition and lyrics ==
Musically, the sound of Spartacus has been described as baggy and dance-rock, taking influence from the work of Buzzcocks, the Clash and the Jam. AllMusic reviewer Stephen Thomas Erlewine said it had all of the hallmarks of baggy, from "its rolling, neo-psychedelic grooves" to the "blissfully colorful pop hooks". The album's title was taken from the 1960 film of the same name. Grimes said that the name worked as a "very tongue-in-cheek analogy between the Farm, who, like, for years didn't have a record label and then decided to do it ourselves[,] ... [b]asically, in spite of all the major record companies". He said McVann's death influenced some of the tracks on the album, such as "Don't Let Me Down".

The album's opening track, "Hearts & Minds", was slowed down from its original recording, and has an offbeat reggae sound. Its title alludes to a rally cry spoken by celebrities and politicians of the time; two years before including it on the album, Hooton said that some lyrics were added to "incorporate the plastic gangster fraternity". Though NME reported that the band had used samples from Taxi Driver (1978), Hooton was adamant that they used impersonators for the audio clips. "How Long" recalled the work of U2, while part of its lyrics referred to Hooton and drummer Boulter visiting the Berlin Wall in East Berlin. Hooton explained that the song talked about politicians rooting for change as long as it served their own ambitions. "Sweet Inspiration" was written around the release of Nelson Mandela and is about political prisoners that stand up for their beliefs even when confronted by authority figures. Discussing "Groovy Train", Grimes said it was an interpretation of people that Hooton knew during school that used to be political, but after acid house, "they've just forgotten about all their politics and just though, 'Sod this! Let's just have a good time'". Hooton wrote the lyrics in the weeks following an encounter with a girl at a nightclub in Liverpool. Journalist Paul Lester wrote that the song consisted of an "iridescent African hi-life [atmosphere], quintessentially baggy 'Funky Drummer' shufflebeat and slashing" Steve Jones-aping guitarwork.

"Higher & Higher" talks about a person facing rejection, which Hooton compared to "Should I Stay or Should I Go" (1982) by the Clash. "Don't Let Me Down" targeted Britain's underclass, anchored by as gospel-like backing vocals. The first verse of it grew out of an older, abandoned song titled "That's the Way We Were", with some lines specifically referring to McVann. Hootson said "Family of Man" asks the question of "why don't the police join the family of man, instead of punishing people at every opportunity?" "Tell the Story", which was an update on "Same Old Story", evoked the sound of fellow Liverpool act the Pale Fountains with its acoustic production. Journalist Bob Stanley wrote that the song's lyrics propose that the "derelict buildings and waste-ground tell a truer story about the band's hometown than thousand Jimmy Tarbuck-fuelled platitudes". It initially had six verses, which were then edited down to two for the final version; Hooton said it referred to the slade trade and the planned redevelopment of Liverpool's Royal Albert Dock. "Very Emotion" evolved out of their 1985 song "Steps of Emotion" and was dedicated to their technician Ray Toohey. He had been involved in a peaceful protest at Risley Remand Centre, but was arrested and imprisoned for 30 months. The band changed the song's lyrics to reflect Toohey's situation, with influence from "Stay Free" (1978) by the Clash.

"All Together Now" began as "No Man's Land", which Hooton had written after the reaction from right-wing press towards British politician Michael Foot wearing a coat that resembled a donkey jacket in November 1981. Alongside this, Hooton had read newspaper articles about the Christmas truce during the First World War, which he learned about from training as a history teacher. "No Man's Land" consisted of six verses sections and lacked a defined chorus. For a few years, Grimes wanted to pair the words with the music of a TV advert, which featured a version of Pachelbel's Canon in D. The band did not attempt to match them until after they had bought the sample; while it worked, the song still lacked a chorus section. They refined the song while in the studio, where they came up with an appropriate chorus. At Suggs' recommendation, the six verses were cut down to three, and half of the music for the chorus was similarly dropped. He then included a sample of Sid Vicious' rendition of the 1969 song "My Way" during the middle eight. At Farley's suggestion, the band wanted to include a beat they knew from a hip hop record. As they were unable to recreate it in a London studio, a member of their entourage was tasked with going to Hooton's house in Liverpool to retrieve it. When they sampled the drum loop, they found that it was partially out of synch with the music they had recorded.

== Release ==
=== "Groovy Train" and "All Together Now" singles, and initial promotion ===
By mid-1990, the Farm were being slotted into the baggy scene, much to the chagrin of Hooton. After some persuading from Sampson, the band travelled to Ibiza, where they would shoot A Short Film About Chilling... Ibiza '90. The location was rising in popularity amongst the British youth and dance cultures. The film coincided with the release of "Groovy Train", helping to grow the band's stature. Soon afterwards, they performed at the Alexandra Palace in London with Big Audio Dynamite. "Groovy Train" was released as the lead single from Spartacus on 20 August 1990. The CD and 12-inch vinyl versions included different remixes of "Groovy Train"; the CD version also featured a remix of "Stepping Stone". The music video for it featured Bill Dean singing into a piece of rock at a Southport fun fair, cut with some footage of their trip to Ibiza. Before the end of the following week, A Short Film About Chilling... Ibiza '90 premiered on Channel 4. The success of "Groovy Train" allowed the band to appear on Top of the Pops twice, and once on The Word. Produce Records received offers from various labels to buy them out, including from Sony Music Entertainment, but all of these were declined. Produce Records also received orders to license out "Groovy Train". One such request was from Sire Records, which was operated by Seymour Stein. He had been to several of the band's performances, which led to them being signed to the label some months later. Up to that point, the song had some success on modern rock stations in the United States as an import release.

"All Together Now" was released as the second single from Spartacus on 26 November 1990. The CD edition featured remixes of the song by Farley & Pete Heller and Rocky & Diesel. The music video for "All Together Now", directed by Angus Cameron, sees the band and members of their families drinking in a pub. It was shot in a pub next to Shepherd's Bush Empire in London; they were concerned that if they had shot the video in Liverpool, too many people would try to gain entry. In January 1991, the Farm supported Happy Mondays at the Great British Music Weekend festival, which featured a line up of Madchester-related acts. Following this, they embarked on a UK tour in February and March 1991, all the dates of which sold out. A launch show was scheduled for 7 February 1991, but was cancelled because of a dispute between the band and Flying Records, as the latter had not paid the band for an earlier show. Ahead of the album's release, promotional remixes of "Very Emotional" and "Higher & Higher" done by Farley and Heller were released as a white label 12-inch vinyl record.

=== Album release and touring ===
After initially being planned for release on 25 February 1991, Spartacus was released on 4 March 1991 through Produce Records in the UK. The album's artwork was created by Hunter, who had experience illustrating from attending a graphic arts school. Grimes explained that the band were being referred to in the British music press as a "very unglamorous band. We should be, like, working in a building profession, or we should be electricians, that type of thing". He decided that since the press thought that they looked like ordinary people, they would make the artwork "as something you'd see in a supermarket, that you wouldn't look twice at". The album featured the Farley and Heller remixes of "Very Emotional" and "Higher & Higher" as additional tracks; the vinyl version limited the remixes to 30,000 copies. To promote the album, the band appeared on the Nicky Campbell show for BBC Radio 1, where they performed "Don't Let Me Down" and "How Long". Around this time, they released their first video album, Groovy Times; it consisted of a live performance of the entire album shot at the London Astoria in December 1990. It also included interviews and the music videos to "Stepping Stone" and "Groovy Train".

Hooton, while appreciative of the attention the band was receiving, felt burnt out from interviews, causing him to lose his voice. The other members of the band similarly suffered from restlessness; Hooton recounted how they were performing in Brighton the same night that the album went to number one "and I don't think we celebrated. We all became blasé even when everywhere on the tour was sold out". "Don't Let Me Down" was released as the album's third single on 22 April 1991; remixes by Farley and Rocky & Diesel were included as its B-sides. Sampson was insistent on reissuing "Stepping Stone" instead of releasing "Don't Let Me Down", while everyone else at Produce Records were in favour of "Don't Let Me Down". The band were concerned they would be seen as sell outs if they went with Sampson's proposal, although they later admitted that his idea would have been a better choice. The music video for "Don't Let Me Down" was filmed in London and starred Frankie Howerd, who the band hired based on his performance in Up Pompeii! (1969). They had to change one of the lyrics, from "stand up and fight" to "stand up, stand up", as the song would not have received airplay or TV airings due to the Gulf War.

Sire Records released Spartacus in the US on 30 April 1991. Warner Bros. Records product management vice president Steven Baker said Reprise Records was brought in to help the band at alternative radio stations in the hopes of having them crossover to top 40 stations. Initially support came from the "Groovy Train" video being on active rotation at MTV. On 1 June 1991, they supported Happy Mondays at the Elland Road football stadium in Leeds. On 3 September 1991, "Groovy Train" was released as a single in the US; it featured remixes of "Groovy Train", "All Together Now" and "Stepping Stone", alongside the non-album single "Mind". As Sire did not like the original music video for "Groovy Train", another one was shot with the band travelling around Manhattan on a London-themed bus. Shortly afterwards, they went on a US tour alongside Big Audio Dynamite and Downtown Science. At that point, Suggs stopped managing the band and, while still producing them, returned to this own music career and the reformation of Madness.

Later in the year, the band failed to sell-out a show in Newcastle; Moran told them that Nirvana was playing a show in the city that same night and had affected the attendance as a result. Unbeknownst to the Farm, the success of Nirvana's Nevermind (1991) some months earlier allowed for the success of grunge acts such as Alice in Chains, Pearl Jam and Soundgarden. Hooton explained that they were "reading about it [in the press] and we saw the Melody Maker attacking us and we realised they wanted to get rid" of Madchester and baggy and "replace it with something that they were more comfortable with". Around this time, the band's second video album, Spartacus Live, was released, featuring footage from a show at the Royal Court Theatre in Liverpool in March 1991. "All Together Now" was released as a single in the US on 6 February 1992, featuring remixes of "All Together Now" and a live demo of "Over Again".

=== Related releases and events ===
In 1991, a box set of Spartacus' three singles, plus "Stepping Stone" and "Mind", was released on 12-inch vinyl under the name Boxsetacus; a CD version followed in 1993. In January 1999, NME reported that Produce Records initiated a legal dispute against BMG Entertainment, claiming that "Macarena" (1993) by Los del Río had copied from "Higher & Higher". The World Intellectual Property Organization later reported that BMG settled out of court on the matter. In May 2004, Edsel Records released Spartacus as double-CD edition under the name Spartacus... Plus, which included B-sides and remixes. The Farm were originally scheduled to perform the album in its entirety on a UK tour in April and May 2012, but the tour was postponed to September and October 2012. Spartacus was included in The Complete Studio Recordings 1983–2004 (2015) box set, alongside all of the band's studio albums plus bonus discs of B-sides, remixes and radio sessions. BMG Rights Management released an EP of "All Together Now" remixes to celebrate the song's 30th anniversary. In March 2021, BMG released a digital expanded edition of the album to celebrate its 30th anniversary.

"Groovy Train", "Don't Let Me Down" and "All Together Now" were included on the Farm's second compilation album, Best of the Farm (1998). All of the songs from Sparatacus were included, albeit in a different running order, on their third compilation album, The Very Best of the Farm (2001). Thieir fourth compilation album, All Together Now: The Very Best of the Farm (2001), included all of the albums tracks except for "Very Emotional". For their fifth compilation album, Alltogethernow – The Very Best of the Farm (2004), "Very Emotional" was included and "How Long" was not; the accompanying DVD featured the music videos for "Groovy Train", "Don't Let Me Down" and "All Together Now". The whole album was again included on their sixth and seventh compilation albums, All Together Now: The Very Best of the Farm (2009) and Groovy Train: The Very Best of the Farm (2017).

== Reception and legacy ==
Professional ratings
Review scores
Source	Rating
AllMusic	3/5 stars
Calgary Herald	B+
The Encyclopedia of Popular Music	4/5 stars
NME	9/10
Record Mirror	9/10
Select	4/5
Sounds	5/5 stars

Critical opinion was split on the quality of Spartacus' songwriting. While noting that a few of the songs had been previously released, Andrew Collins of NME wrote that it was "as solid as a rock record, yet roomy enough to accommodate" experimentation on tracks such as "Hearts & Minds" and "Tell the Story". Stanley, in a review for Melody Maker, praised the band for having "the most astute lyrics" out of their contemporaries, making "it[] that much sadder that this LP is worthy but dull". Doug Iverson of Toledo Blade felt that aside from the first two singles, "it's doubly disappointing that Spartacus ... is so lame". In a review for Select, writer Graham Linehan countered this by stating that it "keeps you alert and live. There's very little filler, very few signs of exhaustion". He went on to praise the songwriting quality and stated that their "honey appreciation of what [makes] a song danceable and memorable guarantees them a longer shelf-life than most". The staff at St. Petersburg Times thought the band set themselves apart from "most of the other '70s revivalists, however, by being so darn serious", taking their "big-haired beat and avocado-harvest gold tones to heart".

Erlewine wrote that the album was "one of the more ridiculous by-products of baggy, ... yet [with] very little of its charm, character, or substance". He added that since the genre was "never about substance, this is particularly damning". Gary Crossing of Record Mirror echoed a similar statement, praising the band's creativity, remarking that Spartacus was "conclusive proof that the Farm are more than just another baggy band". Journalist John Harris, writing in Sounds, said that when compared to their contemporaries, the Farm were "older, wiser, and in far greater command of a killer commercial sensibility" as Spartacus conveys "final confirmation of their sharp musical suss".

Spartacus topped the UK Albums Chart after its first week of release. It was Album of the Month in Select, and included in Vox magazine's 50 Albums of 1991 list. The NME placed the album at number 32 in their list of the Top 50 Albums of 1991. In 1998, Melody Maker considered it the 20th worst album of all time. In 2014, journalist John Robb wrote that "All Together Now" was "not only a great anthemic and uniting pop record, it also came out" during "one of those rare periods when people felt optimistic and [the song] soundtracked this, add[ing] a poignant working class memory".

== Track listing ==
All songs written by Peter Hooton and Steve Grimes.

1. "Hearts & Minds" – 4:24
2. "How Long" – 3:38
3. "Sweet Inspiration" – 5:29
4. "Groovy Train" – 4:10
5. "Higher & Higher" – 4:38
6. "Don't Let Me Down" – 4:37
7. "Family of Man" – 4:44
8. "Tell the Story" – 3:39
9. "Very Emotional" – 4:41
10. "All Together Now" – 5:41
11. "Higher & Higher" (remixed by Pete Heller and Terry Farley) – 6:09
12. "Very Emotional" (remixed by Heller and Farley) – 6:22

== Personnel ==
Personnel per sleeve.

The Farm

- Peter Hooton – lead vocals
- Keith Mullin – guitar
- Steve Grimes – guitar, keyboards, synthesizers
- Carl Hunter – bass
- Ben Leach – keyboards, synthesizers
- Roy Boulter – drums, electronic percussion

Additional musicians

- Paula David – backing vocals
- Pete Wylie – additional backing vocals

Production and design

- Graham "Suggs" McPherson – producer (all except track 8), remixing (track 8)
- Kevin Petri – engineer (tracks 1–3, 5–7 and 9), remixing (track 8)
- Gary Wilkinson – engineer (track 4)
- Mark Saunders – mixing (track 4)
- Paul Heaton – producer (track 8)
- Stan Cullimore – producer (track 8)
- Noel Rafferty – engineer (track 10)
- Terry Farley – remixing (tracks 11 and 12)
- Pete Heller – remixing (tracks 11 and 12)

== Charts ==
Chart performance for Spartacus
Chart (1991)	Peak position
Australian Albums (ARIA)	106
UK Albums (Official Charts)	1

== See also ==
- Some Friendly – the 1990 album by contemporaries the Charlatans, who similarly founded their own label to release their debut

== Bibliography ==
=== Books and AV media ===
- Larkin, Colin (2007). The Encyclopedia of Popular Music. Omnibus Press. ISBN 9780857125958. Archived from the original on 15 January 2023.
- Phillips, Ian (11 March 2022). Ian Phillips Interviews The Farm's Peter Hooton & Keith Mullin. Archived from the original on 6 November 2022 – via YouTube.
- Robb, John (2015). The Complete Studio Recordings 1983–2004 (booklet). Edsel Records. FARMBOX01.
- Simmonds, Jeremy (2003). "The Farm". In Buckley, Peter (ed.). The Rough Guide to Rock. London: Rough Guides. ISBN 978-1-84353-105-0. Archived from the original on 15 January 2023.
- Spence, Simon (2015). Happy Mondays – Excess All Areas: A Biography (paperback ed.). London: Aurum Press. ISBN 978-1-78131-499-9.
- Suggs (2013). That Close (hardback ed.). London: Quercus Editions. ISBN 978-0-85738-953-4.
- Wills, Dominic; Sheehan, Tom (1999). The Charlatans: The Authorised History. London: Virgin Books. ISBN 0-7535-0194-5.
- Wilson, Susan (1997). The Charlatans – Northwich Country Boys. London: UFO Music. ISBN 0-7535-0494-4.

=== Journals and magazines ===
- Anon. (10 May 1991). "Sound Bites". St. Petersburg Times. ISSN 2327-9052.
- Alberts, Sheldon (12 May 1991). "Recent Releases". Calgary Herald. ISSN 1197-2823.
- Collins, Andrew (23 February 1991). "Do the Spart, Man". NME. ISSN 0028-6362.
- Crossing, Gary (1991a). "Albums" (PDF). Record Mirror. ISSN 0144-5804. Archived (PDF) from the original on 4 November 2022.
- Crossing, Gary (1991b). "Have you seen Ben Hur?" (PDF). Record Mirror. ISSN 0144-5804. Archived (PDF) from the original on 4 November 2022.
- Harris, John (2 March 1991). "Albums" (PDF). Sounds. ISSN 0144-5774. Archived (PDF) from the original on 5 November 2022.
- Hayes, John (4 October 1991). "Jones' B.A.D remake is new, but not improved". Pittsburgh Post-Gazette. Archived from the original on 15 January 2023.
- Higginbotham, Adam (June 1991). "Five Bob Show". Select (12). ISSN 0959-8367.
- Iverson, Doug (11 August 1991). "Godfather of Soul struggles to regain his voice of the past". Toledo Blade. Archived from the original on 15 January 2023.
- Linehan, Graham (March 1991). "Reviews: The New Discs". Select (9). ISSN 0959-8367.
- Mann, Bill, ed. (1991a). "First Reports" (PDF). Sounds. ISSN 0144-5774. Archived (PDF) from the original on 20 June 2022.
- Mann, Bill, ed. (1991b). "First Reports" (PDF). Sounds. ISSN 0144-5774. Archived (PDF) from the original on 22 June 2022.
- Mann, Bill, ed. (1991c). "First Reports" (PDF). Sounds. ISSN 0144-5774. Archived (PDF) from the original on 14 July 2022.
- Petruso, Annette (4 October 1991). "Liverpudlian boys on the Farm: Workers or rockers?". The Michigan Daily. ISSN 0745-967X. Archived from the original on 15 January 2023.
- Richliano, Jim (12 October 1991). "New on the Charts". Billboard. Vol. 103, no. 41. ISSN 0006-2510. Archived from the original on 15 January 2023.
- Robb, John (12 May 1990). "Digging for Victory" (PDF). Sounds. ISSN 0144-5774.
- Stanley, Bob (23 February 1991). "Ordinary People". Melody Maker. ISSN 0025-9012.
