= Ultra Flava =

Single by Heller and Farley Project
- Released: 12 February 1996
- Genre: Dance-pop; house
- Label: AM:PM
- Songwriters: Pete Heller; Terry Farley
- Producers: Terry Farley; Pete Heller; Wilkinson

Heller and Farley Project singles chronology
"From the Dat Vol. 1" (1995)	"Ultra Flava" (1996)	"From the Dat Vol. 2" (1998)

Music video
- "Ultra Flava" on YouTube

"Ultra Flava" is a house song by British duo Heller and Farley Project (Pete Heller and Terry Farley). After the wide renown with their remix of Ultra Naté's "How Long" in 1994 and M People's "Open Your Heart" in 1995, they released it as a single in 1996, by AM PM Records. It is a slightly re-worked version of their mix of "How Long", without Naté's vocals. They entitled it "Ultra Flava" as a nod to the track's origins. It became a successful club hit and peaked at number 22 on the UK Singles Chart, while reaching number-one on the UK Dance Singles Chart. In the US, it peaked at number three on the Billboard Hot Dance Music/Club Play chart. A black-and-white music video was also produced to promote the single.

"It's looking very good. Of all the records we've done, this is the most commercial, although I don't think it's that representative of what we do in general."

— Terry Farley talking to Music Week about the song.

== Critical reception ==
Larry Flick from Billboard magazine named "Ultra Flava" a "diamond-hard house gem". On the single review, he wrote further, "Mega-hot U.K. production/songwriting team is primed to enjoy matching stateside success with this, a rousing instrumental anthem influenced by legendary disco bands like the SalSoul Orchestra. Partners Pete Heller and Terry Farley prove adept at crafting taut pop hooks while maintaining a credible deep-house edge. A summertime club favorite on import, the domestic pressing of 'Ultra Flava' boasts refreshing new interpretations by Mousse T., Ralphi Rosario, Boris Dlugosch, and DJ Sneak. A snug radio edit could easily result in a pop/crossover smash à la Robert Miles' 'Children'." James Hamilton from Music Week's RM Dance Update described it as an "infectious Robin S-ishly plopped progressive wriggly percussion groove" in his weekly dance column.

== Impact and legacy ==
British electronic dance and clubbing magazine Mixmag ranked "Ultra Flava" number 33 in its list of the best singles of 1995, "Mixmag End of Year Lists: 1995". DJ Mag ranked it number 85 in their list of the "Top 100 Club Tunes" in 1998, and in 2016 ranked the song number-one in their list of the "Top 50 Tracks of 1996". Tomorrowland featured it in their official list of "The Ibiza 500" in 2020.

== Track listing ==
- UK 12-inch single
1. "Ultra Flava" (Original Flava)
2. "Ultra Flava" (Grant Nelson's 3 Tier Experience)
3. "Ultra Flava" (Vox Version)
4. "Ultra Flava" (Pete's Dub)
- UK 12-inch single
1. "Ultra Flava" (Rhythm Masters Club Mix)
2. "Ultra Flava" (Rhythm Masters Trans Disco Mix)
3. "Ultra Flava" (Melody Flava)
4. "Ultra Flava" (Bass Flava)
5. "Ultra Flava" (Just a Groove)
- UK CD single
1. "Ultra Flava" (Vox Edit) – 3:14
2. "Ultra Flava" (Original Edit) – 3:55
3. "Ultra Flava" (Original Flava) – 7:03
4. "Ultra Flava" (Grant Nelson's 3 Tier Experience) – 6:17
5. "Ultra Flava" (Vox Version) – 6:43
6. "Ultra Flava" (Pete's Dub) – 7:10
- Europe CD maxi
1. "Ultra Flava" (Vox Edit) – 3:45
2. "Ultra Flava" (Original Edit) – 3:56
3. "Ultra Flava" (Original Flava) – 7:03
4. "Ultra Flava" (Grant Nelson's 3tier Experience) – 6:16
5. "Ultra Flava" (Vox Version) – 6:43
6. "Ultra Flava" (Pete's Dub) – 7:10

== Charts ==
=== Weekly charts ===
Chart (1996)	Peak position
Europe (Eurochart Hot 100)	77
Netherlands (Dutch Top 40 Tipparade)	13
Netherlands (Dutch Single Tip)	12
Scotland (OCC)	39
Sweden (Sverigetopplistan)	52
Sweden (Swedish Dance Chart)	4
UK Singles (OCC)	22
UK Dance (OCC)	1
UK Airplay (Music Week)	27
UK Club Chart (Music Week)	1
UK Pop Tip Club Chart (Music Week)	10
US Hot Dance Club Play (Billboard)	3

=== Year-end charts ===
Chart (1996)	Position
Sweden (Swedish Dance Chart)	24
UK Club Chart (Music Week)	8
