= Hurricane Films =

- logo_alt=Hurricane Films Logo
- Company type: Production
- Industry: Film
- Genre: Film, TV, documentary, promotional, educational
- Founder: Roy Boulter and Solon Popadopoulos
- Headquarters: Liverpool, United Kingdom
- Website: Hurricane Films

Hurricane Films is a film production company based in Liverpool, England. It has produced both documentaries and fiction films at both short and feature length. It is best known for Terence Davies' feature-length documentary Of Time and the City (2008).

== History ==
The company was founded in 2000 by Solon Papadopoulos, a marine engineer turned filmmaker, and Roy Boulter, the former drummer for pop group The Farm.

In the early 2000s it made several short films, often films with relevance to social problems or the local area, or films with a twisted take on popular culture. These shorts included Comm-Raid on the Potemkin (2000), a re-interpretation of Sergei Eisenstein's Battleship Potemkin shot in the style of a video game, by the Irish director Enda Hughes; Wrecked (2000), about a drunken journey home in Liverpool city centre; Gutwallops (2000), a surreal tale of family violence; and I'm A Juvenile Delinquent, Jail Me! (2004), a satire of reality television and its exploitation and sensationalising of youth culture, directed by Alex Cox.

== Projects ==
=== Under the Mud ===
In 2004, Hurricane Films began work on a community-based writing project that would become a feature film. Papadopoulos and Boulter visited the economically depressed local area of Garston and enlisted a group of fifteen teenagers with no previous experience in screenwriting to share their experiences and create a film script.

The resulting film, Under the Mud, was made for less than £100,000. Described as "social surrealism" by the producers, the film is a comedy-drama following one day in the life of a Garston family on the day of its youngest daughter's first Holy Communion, as family tensions erupt and the children go missing. It contains various fantasy sequences, as well as moments of drama alternated with slapstick comedy.

Under the Mud played at several international film festivals in 2006 including the Hollywood Film Festival, Victoria Film Festival and Cambridge Film Festival. It did not receive theatrical distribution, but was released on DVD in 2009.

=== Of Time and the City ===
In 2008, as part of Liverpool's Capital of Culture celebrations, Hurricane was awarded a £500,000 Heritage Lottery Fund grant to produce a project of local importance. The company teamed with Terence Davies to make Of Time and the City, a chronicle of Davies' own life as a Liverpool youth and a personal reminiscence on his alienation from society and love–hate relationship with the local area. Narrated by Davies himself, the film showcases masses of archive footage chronicling the evolution of Merseyside over the course of the 20th century, and features poetry excerpts from such authors as T.S. Eliot and Emily Dickinson, as well as a classical music soundtrack composed of works from composers such as Mahler and Sibelius.

Of Time and the City was shown in Competition at the 2008 Cannes Film Festival where it won heavy critical acclaim, and it continued to receive accolades as it expanded into international release. It was named the best film of 2008 by BBC film critic Mark Kermode, won the New York Film Critics Circle award for Best Nonfiction Film of 2009, and Papadopoulos and Boulter were nominated for a 2008 BAFTA Award as "Most Promising Newcomers."

=== Museum Installations ===
In 2010, Hurricane won the tender to produce a specially commissioned immersive film exploring the early lives and career of The Beatles for the new Museum of Liverpool. Made in collaboration with Apple Corps Ltd, "In The Town Where I was Born" is shown in its own purpose-built circular theatre, which also houses the actual stage on which John Lennon and Paul McCartney first met – from St. Peter's Church, Woolton, Liverpool.

The following year, Hurricane were commissioned to make "The Power and the Glory?" A spectacular interpretation of Liverpool's global position in history, showing how industrialisation and the growth and decline of the British Empire created and then almost destroyed the city of Liverpool. The film was shown in its own purpose-built theatre in 2013.

=== The Justice Tonight Band Documentary ===
Formed in late 2011 by Mick Jones (The Clash), Pete Wylie (The Mighty Wah!) and The Farm – The Justice Tonight Band formed to highlight the issues and raise awareness about the injustice surrounding the Hillsborough disaster. Peter Hooton and Roy Boulter from The Farm were both present at the tragedy and have been involved in the campaign for justice. Hurricane Films followed the band throughout 2011 and 2012 as the toured the UK and Europe (supporting The Stone Roses).

=== Paul Heaton – Pedals and Pumps Tour / 50-50 Tour ===
Hurricane Films documented ex-Housemartins and Beautiful South vocalist Paul Heaton's UK tours in 2010 and 2012 with which Heaton cycling 800 miles and 2,500 miles. Playing small independent pubs across the British Isles, the intention of both sold-out tours was to highlight the plight of struggling pubs and support them.

=== Sunset Song ===
In May 2012, Hurricane Films announced at the Cannes Film Festival that Fortissmo Films has acquired the international rights to SUNSET SONG. Adapted by Terence Davies from the celebrated Scottish novel by Lewis Grassic Gibbon, the film to be directed by Davies will star Peter Mullan (My Name Is Joe, War Horse) and former super-model and rising film and stage actress, Agyness Deyn (acclaimed for her West End performance in The Leisure Society). Set in the early 20th century against the backdrop of the poverty of North-East Scotland and looming war, Chris Guthrie (Agyness Deyn), the eldest daughter of a poor farming family, struggles for love amid hardship and family misfortune. The film will be produced by Sol Papadopoulos and Roy Boulter of Hurricane Films with Bob Last executive producing. Bob Last's Holdings Ecosse Ltd initially developed the project with Davies.

=== A Quiet Passion ===
At the Toronto Film Festival in September 2012, Hurricane Films announced that Cynthia Nixon (Sex & the city, The Big C) is to play American Poet, Emily Dickinson, in director Terence Davies' original screenplay A QUIET PASSION. The biopic of Dickinson – America's greatest female poet will trace her life from gifted schoolgirl to tortured recluse – who published just seven poems in her lifetime from over a thousand works.

=== A Prayer Before Dawn ===
Released in UK cinemas during July 2018, A Prayer Before Dawn is directed by Jean-Stéphane Sauvaire and contains a cast including Joe Cole, Pornchanok Mabklang and Panya Yimmumphai.

The film is based on the true story of Billy Moore, a British boxer who was incarcerated in two of Thailand's most notorious prisons.

Based on the 2014 novel of the same title by Billy Moore. The screenplay was adapted for the screen by Nick Saltrese and produced by Roy Boulter, Solon Papadopoulos, Nicholas Simon and Rita Dagher.

=== Sometimes Always Never ===
Written by Frank Cottrell Boyce, who has once again teamed up with director Carl Hunter, the film stars Bill Nighy, Sam Riley and Jenny Agutter.

Sometimes Always Never follows Alan, a tailor, whose family was broken apart when his missing son, Michael, stormed out of the house one night over a game of Scrabble and never came home. In order to repair the void between himself and his youngest son, Peter, Alan finds that it is once again a game of Scrabble that may finally help heal the pains of the family.

The film was released in the UK on 14 June 2019.

=== The Last Bus ===
The Last Bus was filmed in Glasgow in 2019, and is due for release in 2021. Directed by Gillies MacKinnon, it stars Timothy Spall and Phyllis Logan.

=== Filmography ===
Film	Year	Notes
Under The Mud	2006	
Of Time and The City	2008	World Premiere at Cannes. Nominated for 1x BAFTA
Sunset Song	2015	World Premiere at TIFF.
A Quiet Passion	2016	World Premiere at Berlinale.
My Letter to the World	2017	
A Prayer Before Dawn	2017	World Premiere at Cannes.
Unsung Hero: The Jack Jones Story	2018	
Sometimes Always Never	2018	World Premiere at London Film Festival.
The Last Bus	2021	Set for 2021 release.
