= Carl Hunter =

English director, screenwriter and bassist

- Born: 14 April 1965 (age 61); Liverpool, England
- Occupations: Film director, screenwriter, bassist

Carl James Hunter (born 14 April 1965, Liverpool, England) is an English director and screenwriter and the bassist in the Liverpool-based pop group The Farm.

== Career ==
=== Music ===
In 1983, Hunter was part of the second wave of members who joined The Farm, and apart from his musical contributions, he also helped to design their CD jackets and sleeves. The band's 1991 album Spartacus reached number 1 in the UK Albums Chart. Three singles from the band reached the Top 10 in the UK Singles Chart; 1990's "Groovy Train" and "All Together Now", as well as the 2004 remix of "All Together Now".

=== Film and media ===
After completing a Master's Degree in Multi Media Design and Production in 1995, Hunter went on to direct, produce and write a number of short films in the late 1990s, including Blood Sports for All: The Punk Kes and Birthday Boy.

Since the early 2000s, Hunter has worked closely with Frank Cottrell Boyce (writer of Millions and 24 Hour Party People). In 2007, they released the feature film Grow Your Own, a British comedy set on a Merseyside allotment. Hunter acted as a producer and co-writer on the film. Alongside this, he has continued to direct short films and documentaries for television and film festivals. In 2009, Hunter adapted the short story Accelerate, written by Cottrell Boyce for The Reader, into a short online film.

In 2011, Hunter worked as photographic illustrator on Cottrell Boyce's book The Unforgotten Coat, which won the 2012 Guardian Children's Fiction Prize and the 2012 Deutscher Jugendliteraturpreis.

He directed Sometimes Always Never, a feature film written by Cottrell Boyce, that was produced in Northwest England. In May 2016, it was announced that Bill Nighy had joined the cast. The film was released in 2018.

Hunter currently teaches film production at Ormskirk's Edge Hill University, and runs an independent record label based in the university called The Label Recordings featuring artists such as Ali Horn, Hooton Tennis Club, Youth Hostel and The Pre-Amps among others.

== Filmography ==
Year	Title	Credited As
1995	Blood Sports for All: The Punk Kes (Short)	Director
1997	Cottage Cheese (TV Documentary)	Director
1999	Unloveable (Short)	Director and Producer
1997	Tales from the River Bank (TV Documentary)	Director
2000	Cover Stories: A History of Record Sleeve Design in the North-West	Director and Writer
2002	Birthday Boy (Short)	Director and Producer
2007	Grow Your Own	Producer and Writer
2009	Accelerate (Short)	Producer and Writer
2018	Sometimes Always Never	Director
