= AM PM Records =

UK record label; dance imprint of A&M Records Ltd in the UK

AM:PM Records was the dance division of A&M Records Ltd in the United Kingdom from 1994 to 1998, with Simon Dunmore as A&R. In 1998, A&M's owner PolyGram merged with Universal Music Group, and the label's operations paused after Dunmore left to start Defected Records along with two other members of staff. In late 1998 the label's operations moved within Island Records with Dave Lambert of Positiva Records brought in to run the label. The ceased in 2002 following a shake up of Universal by Lucian Grange with AM:PM being folded into sister label Serious. Manifesto Records, the dance label of Universal label Mercury Records was also folded in as part of the shake up along with the closure of Universal TV dance label Wonderboy.

AM:PM produced eleven UK top 40 hits including Ultra Naté's "Free", Mousse T's "Horny", Wamdue Project's "King of My Castle", Goldtrix's "It's Love (Trippin')", Heller and Farley Project's "Ultra Flava", Smokin Beats' "Dreams", MJ Cole's "Sincere", Scott and Leon's "You Used to Hold Me" and "Shine On", and the 2000 release of K-Ci & JoJo's "Tell Me It's Real". The dance label of Universal, similarly named PM:AM Recordings, was launched in 2012 with releases by artists such as Afrojack, Tiesto and Avicii.

The label A&M PM Records was the precursor to AM:PM, which was active from 1990 to 1995. Artists on the A&M PM label included Dina Carroll, CeCe Peniston, Crystal Waters, Alexander O'Neal, Barry White, Sounds of Blackness, Rodeo Jones and Awesome 3.

== See also ==
- List of record labels
