= Distant Voices =

Distant Voices may refer to:

== Books ==
- Distant Voices, by Barbara Erskine 1996
- Distant Voices, by John Pilger 1994

== Film and TV ==
- Distant Voices, Still Lives (1988), a 1988 British film
- "Distant Voices" (Star Trek: Deep Space Nine)
- "Distant voices", an episode of Connections, BBC 1978

== Music ==
=== Albums ===
- Distant Voices, album by Steve Lacy, 1975
- Distant Voices, album by Trisomie 21, 1992
- The Distant Voices EP, by Lost Tribe, 1997

=== Songs ===
- "Distant Voices", a song by John Norum from Face the Truth, 1992
- "Distant Voices", a song by German heavy metal band Rage from Secrets in a Weird World, 1989
- "Distant Voices", a song by British band Bush from Razorblade Suitcase, 1996
- "Distant Voices", a song by Kaipa from Keyholder, 2003
- "Distant Voices", a song by The Farm from Hullabaloo, 1994
- "Distant Voices", a song by Shadowfax from Shadowdance, 1983
- "A Distant Voice", a song by Sonny Simmons from Staying on the Watch, 1966
