= Mind (song) =

Single by The Farm

from the album Love See No Colour
- B-side: "Stepping Stone", "Over Again"
- Released: August 12, 1991
- Recorded: 1991
- Genre: Alternative rock
- Label: Produce
- Songwriters: Peter Hooton; Steve Grimes
- Producer: Suggs

The Farm singles chronology
"Don't Let Me Down" (1991)	"Mind" (1991)	"Love See No Colour" (1992)

"Mind" is a song by Liverpool-based baggy group The Farm, released on 12 August 1991 through the band's label Produce Records as the first single off their second album, Love See No Colour (1992). It was produced by Graham "Suggs" McPherson of Madness. The single peaked at #31 on the UK Singles Chart.

== Track listing ==
- UK CD single
1. "Mind" (Original 7" Mix) - 4:30
2. "Stepping Stone" (12" Original Mix) - 6:30
3. "Mind" (Contorted Face Mix) - 4:39
4. "Over Again" (Live Demo) - 4:12

== Charts ==
Chart (1991)	Peak position
Luxembourg (Radio Luxembourg)	13
UK Singles (OCC)	31
UK Airplay (Music Week)	13
UK Dance (Music Week)	56
UK Club Chart (Record Mirror)	22
