= The Justice Collective =

UK musical group; charity project

The Justice Collective was a collective of musicians and celebrities. The project is spearheaded by Peter Hooton of the Farm. It was originally established in 2012 as a fund-raising record raising money for the various charities associated with the Hillsborough disaster. It is best known for its charity single "He Ain't Heavy, He's My Brother" in 2012. A closely related collective known as the Peace Collective released the charity single "All Together Now" in 2014.

== The Justice Tonight Band ==
After the News International phone hacking scandal, members of the Farm along with Pete Wylie and Mick Jones of the Clash performed at an anti-The Sun concert at the Liverpool Olympia in September 2011. Following this, they formed the Justice Tonight Band and toured the United Kingdom and Europe the following year in order to raise awareness of the Hillsborough Justice Campaign.

== Recording of "He Ain't Heavy, He's My Brother" ==
"He Ain't Heavy, He's My Brother"

Single by The Justice Collective
- Released: 17 December 2012
- Recorded: October–November 2012; Sleeper Studios, Metropolis Studios, Abbey Road Studios (London); Parr Street Studios, Liverpool Institute for Performing Arts (Liverpool)
- Genre: Pop rock
- Length: 4:33
- Label: Metropolis (5065001566387)
- Songwriters: Bob Russell; Bobby Scott
- Producers: Guy Chambers; Richard Flack

Initially, the idea was to re-release the 2009 single "The Fields of Anfield Road" by the Liverpool Collective featuring the Kop Choir; however, this idea was rejected by Peter Hooton as only a relatively small number of people would buy it. Inspired by Everton's Hillsborough tribute on 17 September 2012, the song was played at Goodison Park prior to their match against Newcastle United. It was then decided that a re-recording of "He Ain't Heavy, He's My Brother" would be made by various artists including the Justice Tonight Band and released as the charity single.

Keith Mullen of the Farm recruited Guy Chambers to produce the single and with Chambers offering free use of his Sleeper Studios to record the song. On 25 October, Steve Rotheram, Guy Chambers and Kenny Dalglish announced plans of the single to be recorded by various artists.

In 2012, the Justice Collective recorded a new version of "He Ain't Heavy, He's My Brother", a popular music ballad written by Bobby Scott and Bob Russell made famous by the Hollies. The song went on to take the coveted Christmas number 1 position for 2012 in the UK, beating X Factor winner James Arthur, who was number one the previous week. It was number 2 in Scotland and number 4 in Ireland. The song was recorded with vocals including those of Melanie C, Robbie Williams and two original members of the Hollies, Bobby Elliott and Tony Hicks, for various charities associated with the Hillsborough disaster. The video was produced and directed by Simon Hanning, filming each of the individual artists over many days.

=== Musicians ===
Vocalists include Andy Brown (of Lawson), Gerry Marsden (of Gerry and the Pacemakers), Paul Heaton (of the Beautiful South), Glenn Tilbrook (of Squeeze), John Power (of Cast and the La's), Robbie Williams (of Take That), Melanie C (of Spice Girls), Rebecca Ferguson, Holly Johnson (from Frankie Goes to Hollywood), Paloma Faith, Beverley Knight, Eliza Doolittle, Dave McCabe (of the Zutons), Peter Hooton (of the Farm), Ren Harvieu, Jon McClure (of Reverend and the Makers), Paul McCartney (of the Beatles), Shane MacGowan (of the Pogues), Bobby Elliott and Tony Hicks (both of the Hollies), Hollie Cook (from the Slits), LIPA Gospel Choir, Clay Crosse, Alan Hansen, Peter Reid, comedian John Bishop, writer Neil Fitzmaurice and footballer Kenny Dalglish. Musicians were Chris Sharrock (of Beady Eye and the La's) on drums, David Catlin-Birch (of the Bootleg Beatles and World Party) on bass, Paul McCartney (of the Beatles) on lead guitar, Mick Jones (of the Clash) on electric guitar, Andrew "Davo" Davitt on acoustic guitar, Guy Chambers on piano, Will Pound on harmonica, Liverpool Philharmonic Orchestra on strings, Richard Blake on trumpet/flugelhorn, Matthew Lewis on trombone/euphonium, Meredith Moore on French horn and Will Roberts on tuba. Guy Chambers was producer, Richard Flack producer and engineer and Oliver Som, Liam Nolan, Chris Taylor, Jon Withnall, Tony Draper and Alec Brits as engineer.

== The Peace Collective ==
In October 2014, many members of the Justice Collective reconvened as The Peace Collective, a fund-raising recording of the Farm's 1990 hit "All Together Now" in aid of the British Red Cross and the Shorncliffe Trust. The new track featured a backing choir of schoolboy footballers from the Premier League and German Bundesliga plus a number of music acts including Clean Bandit, Engelbert Humperdinck, the Proclaimers, Gorgon City, Suzi Quatro, Jona Lewie, Alexandra Burke, Julian Lennon, Paul Potts, Jane McDonald, David Gray, Gabrielle, Mick Jones, Tommy Scott, Holly Johnson, and many more. The track was produced by Simon Britton and released on 14 December 2014.
