= Simon Britton =

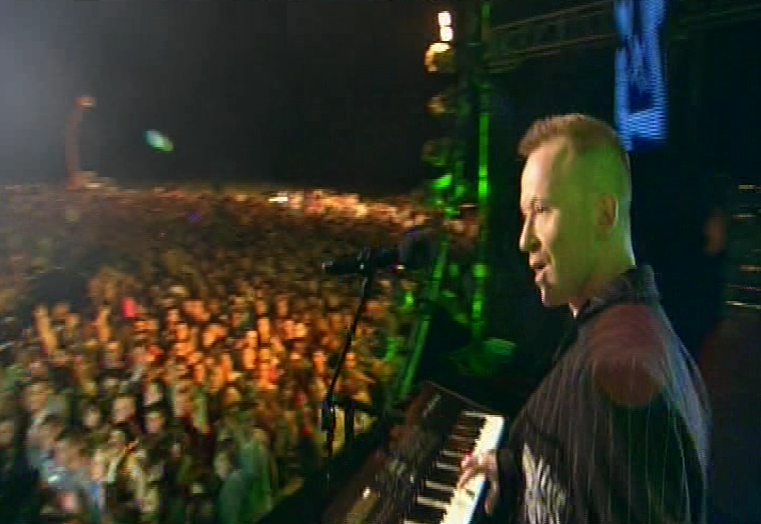
- Performing at the Eska Awards, Poland 2008

Background information
- Born: Simon John Britton
- Origin: Yate, England
- Genres: Pop, synthpop, dance, R&B, hip hop, soul
- Occupations: Singer, songwriter, record producer, actor
- Instruments: Vocals, piano, keyboards
- Years active: 1980s–present
- Labels: Warner Bros. Records, M&G Records, President Records, ZYX Music

Simon Britton is an English record producer, songwriter and actor. He has sold over 50 million singles and albums worldwide.

== Music ==
=== Red Rhythm ===
Britton was one half of Red Rhythm, the production, songwriting and remix team whose credits include: Ashanti, Aaliyah, Boyz II Men, Sean Paul, Tara McDonald, D-Side, Cutfather & Joe, Run DMC, Liberty X, Kool & The Gang, Eminem, Aggro Santos, Kimberly Wyatt, Chaka Demus & Pliers, Beverley Knight, Melanie C, Michelle Williams, Jimmy Cliff, Ginuwine, Missy Elliott, Sting, Talib Kweli, Timbaland, Usher, Michael Jackson, Leona Lewis and the US R&B hit "Da' Dip" by Freak Nasty.

They were commissioned to compose and produced music for advertising campaigns for brands such as Christian Dior, Nat West, and Puma along with official soundtracks to motion pictures for Universal Pictures, New Line Cinema, NBC, Touchstone Pictures and Disney.

=== Producer and writer ===
Britton has gone on to Produce & Work with Artists & Writers including David Gray, Alexandra Burke, Guy Chambers, Nasri, Peter Andre, Victoria Horn, Talib Kweli, Lisa Maffia, Nomfusi, Camo & Krooked, Clean Bandit, Julian Lennon and Phil Rudd of AC/DC.

In October 2014 Britton was asked to produce the charity version of The Farm’s hit All Together Now under the name of The Peace Collective.

=== Red Songs ===
In 2001, Red Rhythm signed a joint venture publishing deal (Red Songs) with Kim Glover.

=== Awards ===
As Red Rhythm, they were recipient to multiple platinum, gold and silver sales. Britton won the 2010/11 British Television Advertising Awards for Best Use of Recorded Music in the PUMA "Hardchorus" television advertising campaign created by the Droga5 Advertising Agency, New York. The video became a worldwide internet hit, landing 130 million media impressions and spawning an international singing competition between France, England, Germany and Italy, which was also named "Hardchorus".
