= Don't Let Me Down (The Farm song) =

Single by the Farm

from the album Spartacus
- B-side: "Stepping Stone"
- Released: 22 April 1991
- Recorded: 1990
- Length: 4:37
- Label: Produce
- Songwriters: Peter Hooton; Steve Grimes
- Producer: Suggs

The Farm singles chronology
"Sinful!" (1991)	"Don't Let Me Down" (1991)	"Mind" (1991)

"Don't Let Me Down" is a single by Liverpool-based pop group The Farm released as the third and final single from their first album, Spartacus (1991). It was released on 22 April 1991 (eight days before the album itself), having been produced by Graham "Suggs" McPherson of Madness. The single reached number 36 on the UK Singles Chart.

The foot featured on the cover of the single is that of John Goldsmid, a model, socialite, and fashion designer, who was renting a studio next to the Farm when the record was released.

== Charts ==
Chart (1991)	Peak position
UK Singles (OCC)	36
UK Airplay (Music Week)	15
UK Dance (Music Week)	56
UK Club Chart (Record Mirror)	38
West Germany (GfK)	78
