= Rock and Roll's Greatest Failure: Otway the Movie =

- Directed by: Steve Barker
- Produced by: Richard Cotton; Karen Lawrence
- Starring: John Otway; Aylesbury Youth Orchestra; Wild Willy Barrett; Adam Batterbee; Paul Clerehugh; Richard Cotton; David Crabtree; Grange School Sixth Form; Bob Harris; Richard Holgarth; Janey Lee Grace; Alistair Mclean; Jon Morter; Dennis Munday; Humphrey Ocean; Nigel Reveler; Mark Thomas; Murray Torkildsen; Barry Upton; Johnnie Walker
- Release date: 30 June 2013
- Running time: 97 minutes
- Country: United Kingdom
- Language: English

Rock and Roll's Greatest Failure: Otway the Movie is a 2013 documentary directed by Steve Barker about the English singer-songwriter John Otway.

== Story ==
The film opens with Otway performing Beware of the Flowers (Cos I'm Sure They're Gonna Get You, Yeah) on stage in front of over 20,000 people at an outdoor gig in his hometown of Aylesbury in 1978 before fast-forwarding to 2012, where Otway gives a talk to students at his old school on how to survive in the music industry. The documentary charts Otway's many—mostly failed—attempts to achieve chart success and the fame and fortune that accompany it, as well as how his dedicated fanbase helped secure him a second hit.

Explaining his initial breakthrough, Otway recounts his appearance on the BBC's Old Grey Whistle Test, where, eager to make an impression, he jumped onto the amplifier of his guitarist, Wild Willy Barrett, only for the amp to topple, sending Otway crashing down and crushing his testicles. The performance propelled the single Cor Baby That's Really Free reaching number 27 in the UK Singles Chart and earned him a £250,000 recording contract with Polydor Records. Polydor A&R man Dennis Munday notes that the label signed the Jam around the same time for £6,000.

Following the hit, Otway and various contemporaries describe how he grew increasingly desperate for a follow-up success and the ways he tried to return to the charts. He released three versions of his single Frightened and Scared without vocals and restricted entry to one gig to those who had purchased a copy of DK50/80; on both occasions the Musicians' Union thwarted him. Otway subsequently published his first autobiography, Cor Baby That's Really Me: Rock and Roll's Greatest Failure.

Otway then pursued television appearances and publicity stunts aimed at reclaiming prominence in the music industry. He teamed up with guitarist Richard Holgarth, who assembled a band for Otway's 2,000th gig at the London Astoria. Promoter Paul Clerehugh explains how the band restored Otway's credibility, while Otway reveals his ambitious plan to perform at the Royal Albert Hall, which he notes is only "twice as big" as the Astoria. Otway struggled to synchronise with the specially commissioned orchestration performed by his original band, the Aylesbury Youth Orchestra, until he succeeded on the night itself before a sold-out crowd, much to his relief.

As the millennium approached, the BBC ran a poll to determine the nation's favourite song of all time, leading to another publicity stunt from Otway and his fans. Fan Ali Mclean recalls realising that votes for established artists would likely be split across many songs, whereas a coordinated campaign for a single Otway track could propel it into the top 10. The strategy succeeded, with Beware of the Flowers, Cos I'm Sure They're Gonna Get You, Yeah reaching number seven.

This inspires Otway and his fans to secure him a second chart hit. However, major retail chains attempted to prevent it. Interviewees note that in 2002, only physical sales through retail outlets counted toward chart positions, not downloads. This market was dominated by big retail chains such as Woolworths, Asda, WHSmith, and Tesco. Artists without distribution in these stores were unlikely to chart. Despite none of the chains stocking Otway's single, a coordinated fan campaign drove Bunsen Burner to number nine in the UK Charts. Even after this and an appearance on Top of the Pops, Woolworths still refused to stock Otway's single and displayed their preferred choice at number nine instead. Otway's campaign inspired Jon Morter's successful effort to make Rage Against the Machine's Killing in the Name the UK Christmas number one in 2009.

Otway admits that the success of Bunsen Burner went to his head, leading him to organise an ambitious world tour. He aimed to stage the "greatest world tour ever," chartering a privet jet to transport himself, his band, and 300 fans to destinations including New York City, Las Vegas, Tahiti and Sydney. He paid a £10,000 deposit to book the large concert hall at the Sydney Opera House, which he considered "significantly cheaper than hiring a jet". Artists such as Glenn Tilbrook and Steve Harley agreed to join the tour. After initial enthusiasm waned and only half the plane was filled, escalating costs forced Otway to cancel the entire venture.

Approaching his 60th birthday in 2012, Otway announced plans to produce and screen a film about his career. The documentary concludes with Otway walking the red carpet in scenes filmed on the morning of the producers' premiere. He explains that fans funded the movie by purchasing tickets for a screening at London's Odeon Leicester Square, earning each a producer credit in the closing credits.

== Release ==
=== Producers' premiere ===
To mark his 60th birthday, Otway booked the Odeon Leicester Square for a special screening of his career story for his fans. The final scenes were shot on the red carpet that morning and edited into the film while the audience watched. Over 1,000 fans attended, and each received a producer credit in the film's end credits. The premiere was considered successful.

=== Cannes Film Festival ===
In May 2013, following further editing, Otway brought the film and a group of fans to the Cannes Film Festival for its international debut. To promote the screening, fans dressed as Otway, wore Otway masks, and marched along the Croisette before gathering on the red carpet.

=== Theatrical release ===
After its positive reception at Cannes, the film received a limited theatrical release, premiering at the Glastonbury Festival in June 2013 and screening in selected UK cinemas throughout the summer. The film garnered positive reviews, with critics describing it as warm, engaging, and enjoyable.
