= Terry Farley =

British DJ

Terry Farley is a British DJ, remixer and producer from London, active since the mid-1980s.

== Career ==
Farley started out going to clubs in the late 1970s and first visited Ibiza in 1982. He then started working as a DJ, performing at the same clubs and shows as Paul Oakenfold. He started out by playing reggae and groove music, but by 1987 switched to house music with tracks like "Jack the Groove" by Raze.

In 1986, he co-founded the fanzine Boy's Own with Andrew Weatherall and others. It mainly covered the music and fashion of the emerging acid house club scene in London. The collective also organized parties under the same title, where Weatherall and Farley would DJ, and eventually founded the successful record label "Boys' Own". Farley was also one of the first DJs at the Shoom events. In 1992, Farley created the record label Junior Boy's Own together with Steven Hall. They became one of the leading labels of British dance music in the 1990s after releasing Dubnobasswithmyheadman, the debut of Underworld, in 1994. Other major releases on the label include Underworld's 1996 album Second Toughest in the Infants and Exit Planet Dust, the debut album from the Chemical Brothers.

Together with Pete Heller, Farley recorded some tracks released on his own label and others like Defected Records, using artist names like Fire Island (e.g. "Shout to the Top!") or Heller & Farley Project (e.g. the song "Ultra Flava").

Farley remains active as a DJ, remixer, and producer. He has compiled many albums, and wrote the liner notes for Balearic Beats on FFRR Records in 1988.

== Discography ==
=== Remixes ===
A selection of remixes made by Farley solo or with Weatherall, Oakenfold or Heller.

- Happy Mondays - "Rave On" (on the Hallelujah EP) (1989)
- Primal Scream - "Loaded" (1990)
- Primal Scream - "Come Together" (1990)
- The Farm - "All Together Now" (1990)
- Pete Wylie and The Farm - Sinful! sinfarlEy + hEllErEmix (1991)
- New Order - "World in Motion" (1990)
- Bananarama - "Only Your Love" (1990)
- New Order - "Regret" (1993)
- Michael Jackson - "Blood on the Dance Floor" (1997)
- Alison Moyet - "Changeling" (2013)

=== As producer ===
Selection of albums produced (usually partially) by Farley.

- The Farm - Groovy Train (1990)
- Kylie Minogue - Kylie Minogue (1994)

== Sources ==
- Shulman, Alon (2019). The Second Summer of Love: How Dance Music Took Over the World. London: John Blake. ISBN 978-1-7894-6075-9.
