= Dreams (Smokin Beats song) =

Single by Smokin Beats featuring Lyn Eden
- Released: 1997
- Recorded: 1996
- Genre: UK garage
- Length: 7:57
- Label: AM:PM
- Songwriter(s): Neil Rumney, Paul Landon, Lyn Eden
- Producer(s): Neil Rumney, Paul Landon

Smokin Beats singles chronology
"The Unreleased Project" (1997)	"Dreams" (1997)	"Rejoice for Life" (1998)

"Dreams" is a song by English house/UK garage duo Smokin Beats, featuring singer Lyn Eden on vocals. It was first released on the duo's own label Smokin Beats in 1996, then released as an official single on the AM:PM label in 1997, containing remixes by Erick Morillo, Ian Pooley and Kings of Tomorrow. The song peaked at No. 23 on the UK Singles Chart, and also reached No. 1 on the UK Dance Singles Chart in January 1998.

In 2015, a set of remixes was released on Hot Source Records containing mixes by artists such as Tough Love, DJ Q, Oxide & Neutrino, Low Steppa, and drum & bass producers Upgrade and Klax. Vice and Breakbeat.co.uk gave positive reviews of the remixes by DJ Q and Klax, respectively.

Redbull.com included "Dreams" in their list of "10 underground UK garage classics that still sound fresh today".

== Charts ==
Chart (1998)	Peak position
UK Singles (OCC)	23
UK Dance (Official Charts Company)	1
