= The Last Bus (2021 film) =

2021 British film by Gillies MacKinnon

- Poster
- Directed by: Gillies MacKinnon
- Written by: Joe Ainsworth
- Starring: Phyllis Logan; Timothy Spall; Natalie Mitson; Ben Ewing
- Cinematography: George Geddes
- Edited by: Anne Sopel
- Music by: Nick Lloyd Webber
- Production companies: Hurricane Films; Head Gear Films
- Distributed by: Parkland Entertainment
- Release date: 27 August 2021
- Running time: 88 minutes
- Country: United Kingdom
- Language: English

The Last Bus is a 2021 drama film directed by Gillies MacKinnon. It stars Timothy Spall as an elderly gentleman who travels the length of the United Kingdom to scatter his late wife's ashes. It was released in the United Kingdom on 27 August 2021.

== Plot ==
Following the death of his wife, Tom travels from John o' Groats in Scotland to Land's End in England using his free bus pass on local buses, to return to where he and his wife grew up and to scatter her ashes. In retrospect, you learn that after their daughter's death one day before her first birthday, Tom's wife wished to leave Land's End and live as far away as possible, so they moved to Scotland. After his wife's death due to cancer, Tom returns to Cornwall with her ashes, being terminally ill with cancer himself. On his road trip, he encounters many adventures and draws the attention of some media and the public.

== Cast ==
- Lauryn Ajufo as Misha
- Nathanael Saleh as Josh
- Timothy Spall as Tom
- Phyllis Logan as Mary
- Ben Ewing as Young Tom
- Natalie Mitson as Young Mary
- Moosa Mostafa as Nas
- Phoebe De Silva as Sophie
- Tom Basden as Mr. Short
- Lara McDonnell as Lucy
- Carys John as Bethan
- Amber-Rose Perry as Borb Puppeteer
- Marlie Morrelle as Chelsea
- Curtis Kantsa as Danny
- Laura Crowhurst as Frank

== Music ==
Sixteen-year-old busker Caitlin Agnew had two of her original songs, "I Wanna" and "Don't Wanna Go Home", featured in the movie, after her father, while working on the movie set, recommended her music to the director.

== Reception ==
On the review aggregator website Rotten Tomatoes, 50% of 28 critics' reviews are positive. The website's consensus reads: "Not even typically brilliant work from Timothy Spall is enough to keep The Last Bus from sputtering into disappointment."
