= Smokin Beats =

House music duo (1993–)

- Also known as: Zoom & DBX
- Origin: England
- Genres: House, UK garage
- Years active: 1993–present
- Labels: Smokin Beats, AM:PM
- Members: Paul Landon; Neil Rumney

Smokin Beats are a house and garage duo consisting of Paul Landon and Neil Rumney. The duo founded their own record label Smokin Beats and released a string of singles throughout the 1990s and 2000s, and one album Ready to Fly in 1997. They are best known for the 1997 hit single "Dreams" featuring singer Lyn Eden which reached No. 23 on the UK Singles Chart and No. 1 on the UK Dance Chart. Redbull.com included the song in their list of "10 underground UK garage classics that still sound fresh today".

Their 1999 single "Dr Love", which samples "Doctor Love" by First Choice, reached No. 97 on the UK Singles Chart and No. 36 on the UK Dance Chart.

The duo have remixed songs by notable artists such as Kristine W ("Feel What You Want"), Backstreet Boys ("Get Down") and Jamelia ("Money").

In the early 2000s under the alias Zoom & DBX, the duo released UK garage tracks including the popular "Comin Again", as well as remixing songs by artists such as Chocolate Puma, TJ Davis and Ed Case.
