= Spirit of Shankly =

Liverpool F.C. supporters' union

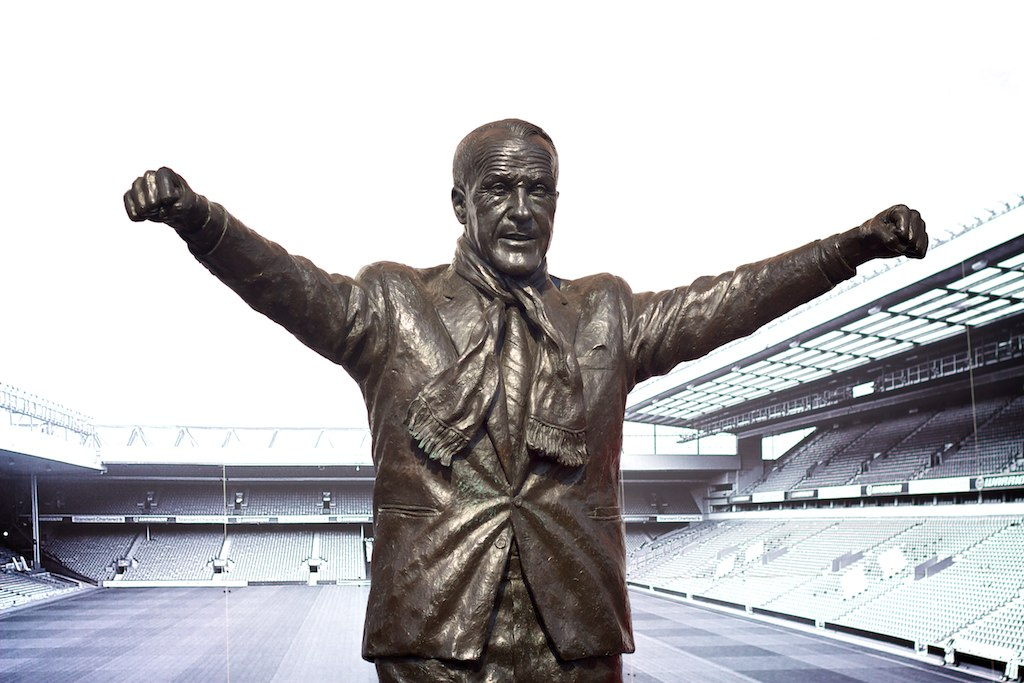
Bill Shankly statue looking out from the Kop

Spirit of Shankly (SOS) is the official supporters' union for Liverpool F.C. and leads its supporters' board. Named after former Liverpool manager Bill Shankly, the union was formed in early 2008 by fans opposed to the ownership of Tom Hicks and George N. Gillett, Jr. It quickly developed into a cooperative representing members and other supporters on ticketing, travel, community, and regeneration. It ultimately seeks fan ownership of the club.

== Background ==
American businessmen Tom Hicks and George Gillett purchased Liverpool in 2007 through a leveraged takeover from David Moores. The purchase was initially met with mixed reactions but little immediate protest, aided by on-pitch success and high-profile signings like Fernando Torres.

However, mounting debts, waning form, conflicts with manager Rafael Benítez, and a perceived reduction in transfer spending eroded the owners' popularity by 2008. During a January FA Cup match against Havant and Waterlooville where Liverpool trailed 2–1, sections of the Kop Grandstand sang "Liverpool Football Club is in the wrong hands," drawing loud boos from the majority of the stand. Subsequently, a meeting was held at The Sandon pub in Liverpool to discuss the situation; fans favoring organized protests formed Spirit of Shankly.

In October 2010, SOS organized transport to the High Court in London for Justice Christopher Floyd's verdict in the case between the Royal Bank of Scotland and the owners.

=== Aims ===
Upon its formation, SOS outlined short, medium, and long-term objectives in its constitution:

Constant Aims

- To represent the best interests of our members and by extension the best interests of the supporters of Liverpool Football Club on both the local and international level.
- To hold whoever owns the football club to account.

Short Term Aims

- To institute a functioning structure for the Spirit Of Shankly.
- To create long lasting relationships with all aspects of Liverpool F.C.'s supporting community.
- To improve the quality of service for Liverpool F.C.'s supporters.
- To improve the standard and value of travel arrangements for Liverpool F.C.'s supporters.

Medium Term Aims

- To work with any relevant agencies to improve the area of Anfield.
- To build links with grassroots supporter groups both home and abroad.

Long Term Aim

- To bring about supporter representation at board room level.

Ultimate Aim

- Supporter ownership of Liverpool Football Club.

== Protests ==
SOS organized its first official protest against Hicks and Gillett on 22 February 2008. After learning Tom Hicks Jr. planned to attend the match, the members remained in the stadium singing anti-owner songs after the end of the match. In addition to this, many in the group began to display banners and sing in opposition to the ownership.

Liverpool managing director Christian Purslow dubbed them the 'Sons of Strikers'.

In February 2010, the union launched a billboard campaign across Merseyside displaying the message "Tom & George: Not Welcome Here" and directing fans to join SOS.

=== Tom & George - Not Welcome Anywhere ===
The "Tom and George - Not Welcome Anywhere" campaign launched on 29 June 2010 to demonstrate global opposition. Supporters submitted photos of the campaign slogan from locations ranging from Anfield to Australia, and Belfast to Bangkok. These images were covered by various media outlets, including the Liverpool Echo, the Spanish newspaper Marca and publications in Hicks' hometown of Dallas.

=== Spirit Of Shankly 4 July Independence Day Rally ===
A large crowd attended an SOS-organized rally at St George's Plateau in Liverpool city centre on 4 July 2010 (American Independence Day). The union framed the event as fans declaring independence from their American owners and outlined plans for a credit union partnership to facilitate a supporter buyout. The day included speeches in support of Spirit Of Shankly and their aims by ex-Liverpool players John Aldridge and Howard Gayle; Comedians John Bishop and Neil Fitzmaurice; Members of Parliament Steve Rotheram and Alison McGovern; General Secretary of the Communication Workers Union Billy Hayes (trade unionist); Karen Gill, the granddaughter of Bill Shankly; and music by John Power, Pete Wylie, Ian McNabb, Peter Hooton, John O'Connell and Sons of Anfield.

=== Tom Hicks Jr. ===
In January 2010, Liverpool director Tom Hicks Jr. (son of owner Tom Hicks) became embroiled in an email exchange with an SOS member. Hicks Jr. called the fan an "idiot" before adding: "Blow me fuck face. Go to hell, I'm sick of you." The release of the emails was a publicity blow for the ownership. An SOS spokesperson called the response "unacceptable" and demanded Hicks Jr.'s resignation, arguing his position was untenable. The club confirmed his resignation shortly after.

== Supporter ownership ==
On 23 July 2010, SOS and the fan organization ShareLiverpoolFC announced they would join forces to pursue fan ownership. ShareLiverpoolFC rebranded as Spirit of Shankly – ShareLiverpoolFC (SOS-SL), although it remained a legally separate entity.

Following the club's sale to New England Sports Ventures (NESV), ShareLiverpoolFC informally retired from campaigning, leaving SOS as the sole organized supporters' group advocating for fan investment and ownership.

== New ownership ==
Following the October 2010 takeover by NESV, SOS released a statement claiming its actions had forced Hicks and Gillett out.

On 18 October 2010 the board of Spirit of Shankly met the new owners of Liverpool F.C. for an informal discussion regarding their organisation and their actions regarding the previous regime. At this meeting, principal owner John W. Henry reportedly told the group: "You guys need to know that without the action and hard work of the Spirit of Shankly, Tom [Werner] and I would not have bought the club."

== Media ==
On 18 June 2010, the Daily Mirror published an article urging fans to join Spirit Of Shankly in their fight against Hicks and Gillett. Increasing media exposure from the Mirror, the BBC, and the Liverpool Echo helped the union grow its membership. SOS was frequently contacted by outlets like Sky Sports News regarding major club stories, including the sacking of manager Rafael Benítez and the appointment of Roy Hodgson.

On 22 May 2012, the Daily Mirror claimed SOS was behind a campaign to have Benítez re-installed as manager following the sacking of Kenny Dalglish. SOS denied having any contact with either the newspaper or Benítez regarding the position.

== Awards ==
On 20 March 2014, SOS was named Cooperative of the Year by the regional social enterprise organization Social Enterprise North West.

== Notable supporters ==
Below is a list of well-known people who are or were Liverpool supporters:

=== Entertainment ===
==== Actors and actresses ====
- Will Arnett
- Millie Bobby Brown
- Kim Cattrall
- Noel Clarke
- Owen Cooper
- Daniel Craig
- Michael Fassbender
- Stephen Graham
- Jason Isaacs
- Angelina Jolie
- Samuel L. Jackson
- Damian Lewis
- John Lithgow
- Mike Myers
- David Morrissey
- Liam Neeson
- Clive Owen
- Brad Pitt
- Billy Bob Thornton
- Ricky Tomlinson
- Adam Woodyatt

==== Music ====
- Gary Barlow
- Chris de Burgh
- Craig Charles
- Elvis Costello
- Dr. Dre
- Lana Del Rey
- Mel C
- James Walsh

==== Television and radio personalities ====
- Johnny Ball
- Kirsty Gallacher
- Robert Kilroy Silk

==== Directors and producers ====
- Asif Kapadia

==== Comedians ====
- Sanjeev Bhaskar
- John Bishop
- Les Dennis
- John Oliver
- Jimmy Tarbuck
- Johnny Vegas

==== Models ====
- Jolie Kidd

==== Writers ====
- Jimmy McGovern

=== Athletes and sports ===
==== Footballers ====
- Sergio Aguero
- Adebayo Akinfenwa
- Trent Alexander-Arnold
- Dele Alli
- Kevin De Bruyne
- Conor Coady
- Harvey Elliott
- Josko Gvardiol
- Curtis Jones
- Ange Postecoglou
- Adrien Rabiot
- Patrick Roberts
- Stephen Warnock

==== American football players ====
- Cameron Dicker
- Minkah Fitzpatrick
- Aaron Rodgers
- Russell Wilson

==== Baseball players ====
- Shane Bieber
- Francisco Lindor

==== Basketball players ====
- LeBron James

==== Golfers ====
- Darren Clarke

==== Hockey Players ====
- Filip Forsberg

==== Professional wrestling ====
- JD McDonagh
- Sheamus

==== Tennis players ====
- Caroline Wozniacki

=== Politicians ===
- Nelson Mandela

=== Other individuals ===
- Pope John Paul II
