= Hullabaloo (The Farm album) =

Studio album by The Farm
- Released: 1994
- Recorded: 1993–1994
- Genre: Madchester, power pop
- Label: Sire
- Producer: The Farm, Gary Wilkinson

The Farm chronology
Love See No Colour (1992)	Hullabaloo (1994)	The Best of The Farm (1998)

Singles from Hullabaloo
- 1. "Messiah" Released: 1994; 2. "Comfort" Released: 1994

Professional ratings
Review scores
Source	Rating
AllMusic	3/5 stars
Q	2/5 stars
Select	3/5

Hullabaloo is the third studio album released by Liverpool-based indie dance group the Farm. It was released on the Sire Records label in 1994 and was critically well received.

== Track listing ==
All songs written by Peter Hooton, Keith Mullin, Steve Grimes, except where noted.

1. "Messiah" – 4:26
2. "Shake Some Action" (Cyril Jordan, Chris Wilson) – 4:05
3. "Comfort" – 4:52
4. "The Man Who Cried" – 5:59
5. "Hateful" – 4:28
6. "Golden Vision" – 5:06
7. "To the Ages" – 4:19
8. "All American World" – 4:36
9. "Distant Voices" – 5:43
10. "Echoes" – 2:30

== Charts ==
Chart performance for Hullabaloo
Chart (1994)	Peak position
Australian Albums (ARIA)	169
