= Sometimes Always Never =

2018 comedy-drama film

- Directed by: Carl Hunter
- Written by: Frank Cottrell Boyce
- Produced by: Roy Boulter; Alan Latham; Sol Papadopoulos
- Starring: Bill Nighy; Sam Riley; Alice Lowe; Jenny Agutter; Tim McInnerny; Alexei Sayle
- Cinematography: Richard Stoddard
- Edited by: Stephen Haren
- Music by: Edwyn Collins; Sean Read
- Production companies: Goldfinch Studios; Hurricane Films
- Distributed by: Blue Fox Entertainment
- Release dates: 12 October 2018 (BFI London Film Festival); 14 June 2019 (United Kingdom); 12 June 2020 (United States)
- Running time: 91 minutes
- Country: United Kingdom
- Language: English
- Box office: $1.4 million

Sometimes Always Never is a 2018 British comedy-drama film directed by Carl Hunter and written by Frank Cottrell Boyce, starring Bill Nighy, Sam Riley and Jenny Agutter.

== Premise ==
Alan is a stylish tailor with moves as sharp as his suits. But he has spent years searching tirelessly for his missing son, Michael, who stormed out over a game of Scrabble. With a body to identify and his family torn apart, Alan must repair the relationship with his younger son and identify an online player who he thinks could be Michael, so that he can finally move on and reunite his family.

== Cast ==
- Bill Nighy as Alan
- Sam Riley as Peter
- Jenny Agutter as Margaret
- Alice Lowe as Sue
- Tim McInnerny as Arthur
- Alexei Sayle as Bill
- Louis Healy as Jack

== Reception ==
On the review aggregator Rotten Tomatoes, the film holds an approval rating of 82% based on 95 reviews, and an average rating of 6.8/10. The website's critical consensus reads, "Like the grieving Scrabble enthusiast at the heart of its unique story, Sometimes Always Never scores high enough to be well worth a play." Metacritic reports a score of 67/100 based on 19 critics, indicating "generally favorable reviews".

Kambole Campbell of Empire wrote, "Despite strong performances and a witty script, Sometimes Always Never lays on the homage a little too thick for its own good, shortchanging itself by imitating a particularly idiosyncratic style." Wendy Ide of The Guardian wrote, "The danger of an offbeat British film, particularly one that is as emphatically designed as this, is that it could teeter into whimsy and artifice. But thanks to Cottrell Boyce, and the assured direction of first-time feature film-maker Carl Hunter, the emotional beats are authentic and the distinctive look of the film – it takes its aesthetic cues from '60s ties and '70s wallpaper – never upstages the story." Also features Anthony Gormley 'Being Human" statues at Crosby Nr Liverpool.
