= Groovy Train =

Single by The Farm

from the album Spartacus
- B-side: "Stepping Stone"
- Released: 20 August 1990
- Studio: Liquidator Studios (London)
- Genre: Baggy
- Length: 4:10
- Label: Sony
- Songwriters: Peter Hooton; Steve Grimes
- Producers: Suggs; Terry Farley

The Farm singles chronology
"Stepping Stone" (1990)	"Groovy Train" (1990)	"All Together Now" (1990)

"Groovy Train" is the second single released by Liverpool-based group The Farm. It was released in 1990 as the first single from their debut album Spartacus (which would be released in 1991), having been produced by Graham "Suggs" McPherson of Madness and Terry Farley. The single reached no. 6 on the UK Singles Chart, no. 41 on the US Billboard Hot 100, and no. 15 on the US Billboard Modern Rock Tracks chart.

It contains a distinctive guitar intro by Keith Mullin which was possibly his most significant contribution to any one song. "Groovy Train" featured on the influential 1990 Madchester compilation album Happy Daze.

The video for the single was filmed at Pleasureland Southport and features a cameo from actor Bill Dean, who at the time was in Liverpool soap opera Brookside. His character, Harry Cross, was a retired train driver, and Dean is seen in the video driving a train with the band aboard.

== Charts ==
Chart performance for "Groovy Train"
Chart (1990–1991)	Peak position
Australia (ARIA)	113
Canada Top Singles (RPM)	59
Europe (Eurochart Hot 100)	22
Luxembourg (Radio Luxembourg)	4
Netherlands (Dutch Top 40 Tipparade)	6
Netherlands (Single Top 100)	41
UK Singles (Official Charts)	6
UK Indie (Music Week)	1
US Billboard Hot 100	41
US Billboard Hot Dance Club Play	4
US Billboard Hot Dance Music/Maxi-Singles Sales	24
US Billboard Modern Rock Tracks	15
US Cash Box Top 100	25
