= The Farm (British band) =

British band from Liverpool 1991

- Promotional photograph of The Farm in 1992; L to R: Ben Leach, Carl Hunter, Roy Boulter, Keith Mullin (back row), Steve Grimes and Peter Hooton (front row)

Background information
- Origin: Liverpool, England
- Genres: Alternative rock; alternative dance; baggy; indie rock
- Years active: 1983–1996, 2004–present
- Labels: Produce; Sire
- Members: Peter Hooton; Steve Grimes; Carl Hunter; Roy Boulter; Keith Mullin; Ben Leach; Alex Goatly

The Farm are an English band from Liverpool. Their first album, Spartacus, reached the top position on the UK Albums Chart when it was released in March 1991; Spartacus 30 was released in 2021 to commemorate the anniversary. Spartacus includes two songs which had been top 10 singles the year before. In 2012, they toured with their Spartacus Live shows and formed part of the Justice Tonight Band, supporting the Stone Roses at Heaton Park, Phoenix Park, Lyon and Milan. They formed part of The Justice Collective which had the 2012 Christmas number one with their recording of "He Ain't Heavy, He's My Brother".

== History ==
The band was formed in early 1983 and initially comprised Peter Hooton, Steve Grimes, John Melvin and Andrew John "Andy" McVann, who was killed in a police chase on 1 October 1986 at the age of 21, and to whose parents the band's subsequent album, Spartacus, is dedicated.

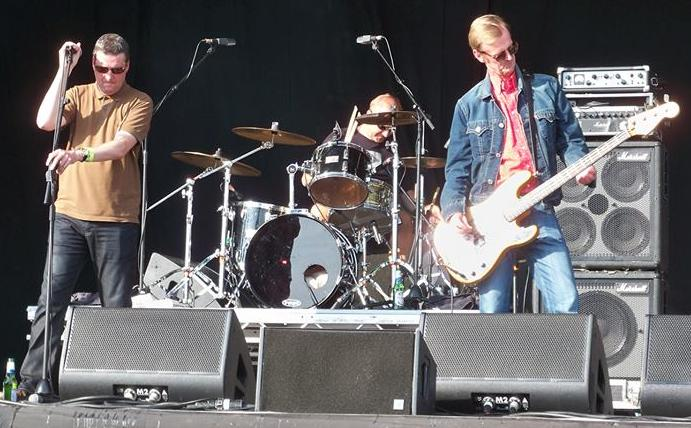
The Farm playing on the main stage at Guilfest 2014

The band evolved from an earlier group called The Excitements, initially including Phil Stephenson on bass guitar, Neil (Cad) Campbell on drums, Grimes on guitar and Thomas (the band's dancer). They became The Farm after Martin Dunbar (vocals) left and Peter Hooton joined, although they did play several gigs as The Excitements with Hooton on vocals. In 1984, they released the single, "Hearts and Minds", produced by Graham "Suggs" McPherson, lead vocalist with Madness. In 1986, after McVann's death, Melvin left the band to pursue a varied career as the director of his own construction firm, but he eventually returned to music in 1990 under the guise of Mr. Smith, a two-piece band that toured frequently, but did not release anything of note. In 1987, the band supported the Housemartins on their UK tour.

After the departure of Melvin and the death of McVann, Hooton brought in a new line-up. They released four independent singles, but did not have a big break until 1990. In 1989, the band had been given a cameo role in the movie The Final Frame starring Suggs. They were signed after this and hired Suggs as their producer. Their first single under new management was "Stepping Stone", a dance remake of Paul Revere & the Raiders and The Monkees' single "(I'm Not Your) Steppin' Stone", a 1966 single that in its day reached No. 20 in the U.S. Billboard charts for The Monkees. They appeared in The Face, an influential popular culture magazine in the UK, and their promotion of "No alla violenza" anti-hooligan T-shirts during Italia 90 helped to raise their profile further.

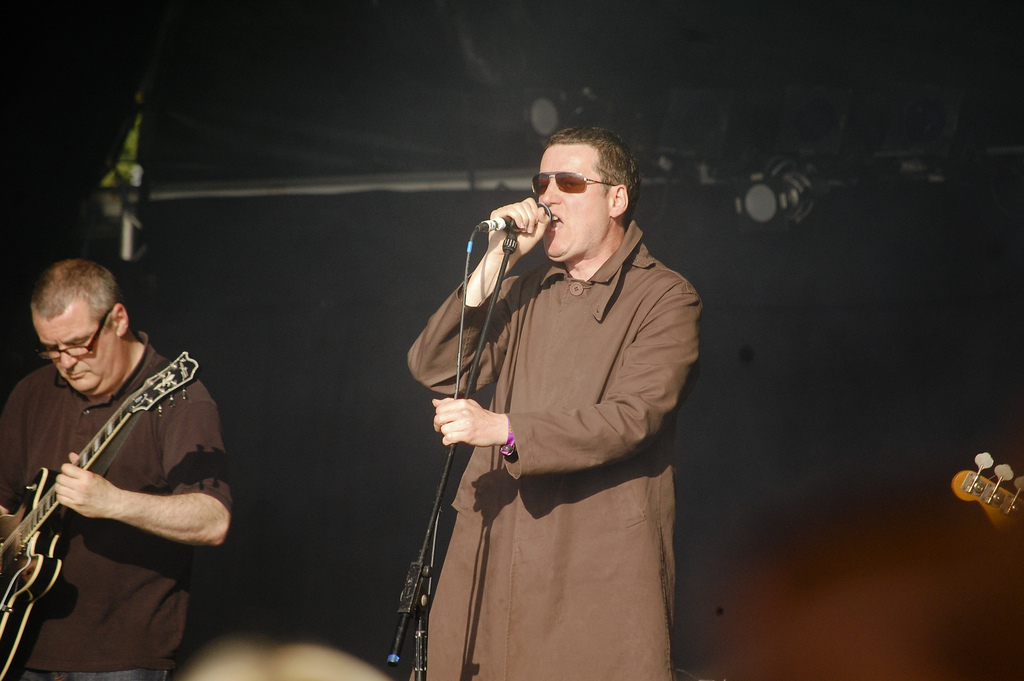
The Farm at GuilFest 2011

The Farm's first song to reach the top part of the UK Singles Chart was "Groovy Train", which reached the Top 10 in September 1990. During the summer that year they played in Ibiza and were a key feature in the film A Short Film About Chilling. In late November that year, they released their most memorable song, "All Together Now", which instantly became a hit and peaked at number four in the charts in December 1990. It was on the crest of this wave that their album Spartacus reached No. 1 in the UK the following year.

In 1991, the Farm teamed up with Pete Wylie of Wah! (The Mongrel), to re-record his 1986 hit "Sinful" in the indie-dance 'baggy' style and followed it up with three smaller hits on the Produce record label.

With the success of Spartacus, the band signed a major label deal with Sony Records, who gave them their own End Product record label (which played on the name of their former independent record company Produce). However their success was to be short-lived due to changes in the indie music scene and the move to a major. Their first single for Sony, "Rising Sun" (1992), moved away from the baggy sound and did not perform well, peaking at Number 48 in the UK Top 75. At this point the band had split from producers Suggs (who'd left to reform Madness), Pete Heller and Terry Farley and had joined up with Mark Saunders, who had produced Erasure and The Cure. In October 1992, they reached the Top 20 with a cover version of The Human League's "Don't You Want Me", recorded for charity album Ruby Trax - The NME's Roaring Forty (a follow-up to the NME's Sgt. Pepper Knew My Father).

The Farm's last 'new' top 40 under their own name was a re-recorded version of "Love See No Colour", now used as the title track of their 1992 album. The Sony Music version dispensed of the 'Scally-baggy' rhythms of the original Produce release (which had got 'lost in the Christmas chart rush' at the end of 1991), for a slower more synthpop sound with gospel overtones and a big budget video using classical and religious imagery. However, this song only reached Number 35 in the UK charts while the parent album did not chart at all (which means that The Farm join Steve Brookstein and Johnny Hates Jazz in the list of album chart 'One-Hit Wonders'). The Farm were dropped from Sony Music.

In 1994, they released the album Hullabaloo on the Sire label, followed by their last major single. Despite being a group largely supporting Liverpool F.C., they allowed Everton Football Club to release a version of "All Together Now" on MDMC Records (which was credited to Everton FC by the UK top 40) to accompany their presence in the 1995 FA Cup Final, in which Everton beat Manchester United 1-0.

Their most recent hit single under their own name was "All Together Now 2004", featuring the S.F.X. Boys Choir of Liverpool, as the official anthem of the England National Football Team at Euro 2004. It was issued on 31 May 2004 and, as the name suggests, in a slightly remixed format, with radio commentary from the Euro 2004 qualifiers added to the track, whilst a bonus remix was included on the single with the help of DJ Spoony.

The Farm was also one of the first bands to perform at the Echo Arena Liverpool when it opened in January 2008.

=== The Collective ===
The Farm were also central to the track released to commemorate the Hillsborough disaster, "The Fields of Anfield Road", the proceeds going to the families of those who were killed. Credited to the Liverpool Collective featuring the Kop Choir, this single was a new entry at number 16 on the UK Singles Chart on 12 April 2009 and reached number 14 a week later.

In 2011, the Farm joined forces with others to create the Don't Buy The Sun Gig, at the Olympia in Liverpool, which was part of the protests on Merseyside against The Sun newspaper for its false reporting on the Hillsborough disaster 22 years before. This comprised Mick Jones from the Clash, Pete Wylie from the Mighty Wah, John Power and others. This then formed the core of The Justice Tonight Band which toured from 2011 to 2012, including four performances supporting the Stone Roses in their comeback tour in 2012. The Justice Tonight Band headlined the Strummerville festival in 2012 and went on to form the Justice Collective who had the Christmas number 1 with their version of "He Ain't Heavy, He's My Brother", a charity single in aid of the families of the victims of the Hillsborough disaster.

In 2014, 'the Collective' reconvened again to record another charity record, with "All Together Now" being re-recorded again by members of the Farm now under The Peace Collective name. However, unlike "The Fields of Anfield Road" or "He Ain't Heavy, He's My Brother", this failed to chart in the UK top 40, peaking at number 70.

=== 2010s to present ===
Throughout 2013 and 2014, the band have continued to perform at festivals around the UK, including the Isle of Wight Festival in 2013. In 2014, Alan McGee said that the band's acoustic gig at his new venue The Tabernacle, was in his "Top Ten All Time Gigs". The Farm continued to perform live in 2015 at various festivals such as at the Shiiine On Weekender in November, 2015 and appeared live doing a number of acoustic performances.

In 2016, the band along with numerous other celebrities, toured the UK to support Jeremy Corbyn's bid to become Prime Minister. In June 2017, the band supported a Labour Party rally prior to the 2017 UK general election.

In 2018, Carl Hunter directed the feature film Sometimes Always Never, which was written by Frank Cottrell Boyce and starred Bill Nighy, Sam Riley, Alice Lowe, Jenny Agutter and Tim McInnerny. This film received a 4 star review in The Guardian and even though the soundtrack featured music by Edwyn Collins and Sean Read rather than the Farm, the film was produced by members of group.

To commemorate the 30th anniversary of Spartacus being No. 1 in the album charts, BMG released Spartacus 30 which includes many tracks/remixes previously unavailable and released a HD version of "Groovy Train".

Former member George Maher died in December 2022.

In June 2025, the band announced the release of their first new album in 31 years, entitled "Let The Music (Take Control)", which contains ten new tracks.

== Trivia ==
The band name The Farm has often thought to have had an association with the Liverpool/Knowsley suburb Cantril Farm now Stockbridge Village however no members of the group came from there although Peter Hooton did work as a youth worker on the estate in the 1980's.

== Members ==
Current members

- Peter Hooton – vocals (1983–1996, 2004–present)
- Steve Grimes – guitar, keyboards (1983–1996, 2004–present)
- Keith Mullin – guitar (1986–1996, 2004–present)
- Carl Hunter – bass guitar (1986–1996, 2004–present)
- Ben Leach – keyboards (1988–1996, 2004–present)
- Roy Boulter – drums (1987–1996, 2004–present)

Former members

- Paula David – backing vocals (1989–1993)
- Phil Strongman – bass guitar (1983–1986)
- Andy McVann – drums (1983–1986; died 1986)
- Anthony Evans – brass (1984–1986)
- Steve Levy – brass (1984–1986)
- George Maher – brass (1984–1986; died 2022)
- John Melvin – brass (1984–1986)
- Mick Hanratty – drums (1985–1987)
- Bobby Bilsborough – brass (1988–1990)
- David Peel – brass (1988–1990)
- Howard Beesley – guitar (1980–1984)

== Discography ==
=== Studio albums ===
List of albums, with selected chart positions
Title	Album details	Peak chart positions				Certifications
Title	Album details	UK	AUS	NED	SWI	Certifications
Spartacus	Released: March 1991; Label: Produce	1	106	45	37	BPI: Gold
Love See No Colour	Released: 1992; Label:	—	—	—	—	
Hullabaloo	Released: 1994; Label: Sire	—	169	—	—	
Let The Music Take Control	Released: 2025	—	—	—	—	

=== Other albums ===
- Pastures Old and New (1986) [compilation]
- Spartacus Live (1991) [video]
- Groovy Times (1991) [video]
- Best of the Farm (1998) [compilation]
- The Very Best of the Farm (2001) [compilation]
- Back Together Now! Live (2006) [video]
- All Together with the Farm (2007) [live album]

=== Singles ===
List of singles, with selected peak chart positions and certifications
Title	Year	Peak chart positions								Certifications	Album
Title	Year	UK	AUS	BEL (FL)	GER	IRE	NLD	SWI	US	Certifications	Album
"Hearts and Minds"	1984	—	—	—	—	—	—	—	—		Pastures Old and New
"Steps of Emotion"	1985	—	—	—	—	—	—	—	—		Pastures Old and New
"Some People"	1986	—	—	—	—	—	—	—	—		Pastures Old and New
"Body and Soul"	1989	—	—	—	—	—	—	—	—		Non-album singles
"Stepping Stone" / "Family of Man"	1990	58		—	—	—	—	—	—		Non-album singles
"Groovy Train"	1990	6	113	—	—	—	41	—	41		Spartacus
"All Together Now"	1990	4	102	13	5	—	9	18	— (Note: "All Together Now" did not enter the Billboard Hot 100, but peaked at number 7 on the Modern Rock Tracks chart.)	BPI: Silver	Spartacus
"Sinful! (Scary Jiggin' with Doctor Love)" (with Pete Wylie)	1991	28	—	—	—	25	—	—	—		Non-album single
"Don't Let Me Down"	1991	36	194	—	78	29	—	—	—		Spartacus
"Mind"	1991	31	—	—	—	15	—	—	—		Love See No Colour
"Love See No Colour"	1992	58	—	—	—	30	—	—	—		Love See No Colour
"Rising Sun"	1992	48	168	—	—	—	—	—	—		Love See No Colour
"Don't You Want Me"	1992	18	115	–	–	19	–	–	–		Love See No Colour
"Love See No Colour" (re-mix)	1992	35	—	—	—	—	—	—	—		Love See No Colour
"Messiah"	1994	92	—	—	—	—	—	—	—		Hullabaloo
"Comfort"	1994	—	—	—	—	—	—	—	—		Hullabaloo
"All Together Now" (Everton FA Cup Final version)	1995	24	—	—	—	—	—	—	—		Non-album singles
"All Together Now 2004" (featuring SFX Boys Choir)	2004	5	—	—	—	—	—	—	—		Non-album singles
"–" denotes releases that did not chart or were not released.
