= All Together Now (The Farm song) =

1990 single by the Farm

Single by The Farm

from the album Spartacus
- Released: 26 November 1990
- Genre: Madchester
- Length: 3:59; 5:41 (album and 12-inch version)
- Label: Produce
- Composer: Johann Pachelbel
- Lyricists: Peter Hooton; Steve Grimes
- Producer: Suggs

The Farm singles chronology
| "Groovy Train" (1990) | "All Together Now" (1990) | "Sinful!" (1991) |

Music video
- "All Together Now" on YouTube

"All Together Now" is a song by the British band the Farm and the second single from their debut album, Spartacus (1991). The song was released in November 1990 by Produce Records. Vocalist of the band Peter Hooton wrote the lyrics in his early 20s, after reading about the Christmas truce of 1914. The song was first recorded under the title "No Man's Land" for a John Peel session in 1983. In 1990, Hooton wrote the chorus after Steve Grimes suggested putting the lyrics of "No Man's Land" to the chord progression of Pachelbel's Canon. To shorten the song for radio, the producer Suggs cut the song to three verses from its original six. Its accompanying music video received heavy rotation on MTV Europe in March 1991. "All Together Now" has been used by numerous football teams since, including being the theme song to Sky Sports' coverage of The Football League between 2004 and 2009, as well as by the Labour Party for their 2017 general election campaign, often played during rallies. Plus, it was the ending theme for the 1994 film, Double Dragon.

== Background and release ==
The Farm were formed in the early 1980s in Liverpool, comprising Peter Hooton, Steve Grimes, John Melvin and Andrew John "Andy" McVann. In 1989, the band had been given a cameo role in the movie The Final Frame starring founding member of Madness and actor Suggs. They were signed after this and hired Suggs as their producer. The Farm were originally an indie band, but after hearing "Loaded" by Primal Scream, which was a top-20 hit in the UK at the time, they wanted to try something more dance-oriented. Band member Grimes wanted to use "Pachelbel's Canon" by Johann Pachelbel in a song after hearing it in a TV advert and a chord sequence was taken from it. The band bought a sampler so they could do it, and they contacted DJ and house music producer Terry Farley. When he heard the result, he said, "That's a hit. You've got to write some lyrics."

Vocalist Peter Hooton used lyrics from a song he had written earlier, named "No Man's Land". It was first recorded for a John Peel session in 1983. Verses from that song were used to make "All Together Now". The lyrics tells about the Christmas Day Truce in World War I where, on Christmas Day 1914, soldiers from both sides put their weapons down, and met in no man's land to exchange gifts and play football. "All Together Now" originally had six verses, but was cut in half to shorten it, after Suggs suggested this. He produced it and it was recorded at Mayfair Studios in London. The single was originally released on 26 November 1990 peaking at No. 4 on the UK Singles Chart, and No. 7 on the US Billboard Modern Rock Tracks chart. Its cover showed a Subbuteo figure wearing an army uniform and brandishing a Bren machine gun. It was also the last video shown on The Power Station on 8 April 1991.

== Critical reception ==
Stephen Thomas Erlewine from AllMusic called "All Together Now" "goofily endearing" and "truly memorable". Larry Flick from American magazine Billboard considered it "anthemic". A reviewer from Daily Mirror named it one of 1990's "most memorable songs" and "such a catchy song". Jon Wilde from Melody Maker wrote, "1990 has seen the inexplicable rise of The Ordinary Bloke. They don't come any more ordinary than the Farm, who look for all the world like a collection of bit actors in Northern soap operas, the kind of geezers you find hanging about by the pub dart-board scoffing salt and vinegar crisps as burly Betty Turpin types fetch hither mixers from the cellar. Their 15 seconds of minor celebrity will surely be up once the general public get wind of this ruthlessly awful rock dirge with dancefloor pretensions." Another Melody Maker editor, Bob Stanley, complimented the song as "excellent" and a "enjoyable moment" of the album. Andrew Collins from NME named it "easily this LP's grandest moment" and "one of 1990's most durable hits, a scarfs-out-for-the-lads 'Abide with Me' for last orders."

Another NME editor, David Quantick, commented, "Sometimes the Farm seem to be more anonymous than the person underneath the Jive Bunny mask. [...] And now they return with a record that has a powerfully singable chorus, a pounding beat, Shaun Ryder's vocal dad Pete Wylie on backing singing...and I'm beggered if I can remember it for more than a nanosecond after it's over. A chorus without a verse, an anthem without a purpose, an answer without a question." Andy Strickland from Record Mirror named it Single of the Week, adding, "With things hotting up in the Gulf, this could prove to be one of the most poignant pop hits since the late Sixties. Musically, it picks up where 'Groovy Train' left off; great groove, spacey guitar into and a guaranteed sing-a-long dancefloor filler." Miranda Sawyer from Smash Hits wrote, "It's a banner-waving epic, that's what it is. Blimey. There's still a nice jittery beat to shake your roomy trouserwear to, but the catchy chorus is unmistakably of the proud-scarf-waving-and-lighters-aloft genre. If you're into flopping your fringe about then you'll be a bit disappointed for this is definitely one for the terraces. Nice and uplifting."

== Track listings ==
- UK 7-inch single (1990)
1. "All Together Now" (7-inch version) – 3:59
2. "All Together Now" (Terry Farley/Peter Heller mix edit) – 3:45
- UK 12-inch and CD single (1990)
1. "All Together Now" – 5:45
2. "All Together Now" (Terry Farley/Peter Heller mix) – 7:21
3. "All Together Now" (Rocky/Diesel mix) – 5:13
- US CD single (1990)
1. "All Together Now" (Single mix) – 4:25
2. "All Together Now" (12-inch mix) – 5:42
3. "All Together Now" (Indie Rock mix) – 6:22
4. "All Together Now" (Farley/Heller 12-inch remix) – 7:21
5. "Over Again" (live demo) – 4:16
6. "All Together Now" (club mix) – 6:13
7. "All Together Now" (Rocky & Diesel mix) – 5:18
8. "All Together Now" (Dream remix) – 9:27
- UK CD single (2004)
1. "All Together Now" (DJ Spoony radio edit)
2. "All Together Now" (The Choral mix)
3. "All Together Now" (Spoony Wants to Move mix)
4. "The Wembley Experience" (Virtual Tour of the New Stadium)

== Charts ==
=== Weekly charts ===
1990 version

| Chart (1990–1992) | Peak position |
|---|---|
| Australia (ARIA) | 102 |
| Belgium (Ultratop 50 Flanders) | 13 |
| Europe (Eurochart Hot 100) | 13 |
| Europe (European Hit Radio) | 10 |
| Germany (GfK) | 5 |
| Israel (Israeli Singles Chart) | 20 |
| Luxembourg (Radio Luxembourg) | 3 |
| Netherlands (Dutch Top 40) | 7 |
| Netherlands (Single Top 100) | 9 |
| Switzerland (Schweizer Hitparade) | 18 |
| UK Singles (Official Charts) | 4 |
| UK Airplay (Music Week) | 14 |
| UK Indie (Music Week) | 1 |
| US Modern Rock Tracks (Billboard) | 7 |
| US Cash Box Top 100 | 71 |

2004 version

| Chart (2004) | Peak position |
|---|---|
| UK Singles (Official Charts) | 5 |
| UK Indie (Official Charts) | 1 |

=== Year-end charts ===
1990 version

| Chart (1991) | Position |
|---|---|
| Europe (European Hit Radio) | 93 |
| Germany (Media Control) | 26 |
| Netherlands (Dutch Top 40) | 81 |

| Chart (1992) | Position |
|---|---|
| Brazil (Crowley) | 18 |

2004 version

| Chart (2004) | Position |
|---|---|
| UK Singles (OCC) | 140 |

== Everton F.C. version ==
In May 1995, the song was released by Everton F.C. on occasion of its appearance in the 1995 FA Cup Final. The hit credited to "Everton FA Cup Squad 1995" peaked at No. 24 in the UK Singles chart. The release also contained a second version as "All Together Now – D.i.y Mix".

== Euro 2004 version ==
The song was released in another football context this time to promote the campaign of the England national football team during Euro 2004 which took place in Portugal in June and July 2004. Titled "Euro 2004 (All Together Now)", it was edited by DJ Spoony and featured additional vocals by the St Francis Xavier Boys Choir of Liverpool. This version, released on 31 May 2004, peaked at No. 5 in the UK Singles Chart.

The song was also remixed by Scouse producers BCD Project (Lee Butler of Radio City, Les Calvert and Mike Di Scala). The remix was featured on the Clubland 5 compilation in 2004.

This version was also included in the compilation Sports Themes subtitled "20 Classic Sport Themes" in July 2004.

== Atomic Kitten version ==
"All Together Now (Strong Together)"

Single by Goleo VI featuring Atomic Kitten

from the album Goleo VI Presents His 2006 FIFA World Cup Hits
- Released: 13 May 2006
- Length: 3:08
- Label: Ministry of Sound
- Songwriters: Nicole Tyler; Peter Hooton; Steve Grimes; Wolfgang Boss; Reinhard Raith
- Producers: Andreas Litterscheid; Reinhard Raith

Atomic Kitten singles chronology
| "Cradle" (2005) | "All Together Now (Strong Together)" (2006) | "Anyone Who Had a Heart" (2008) |

In 2006, Liz McClarnon, Natasha Hamilton, and Jenny Frost from English girl band Atomic Kitten reunited to record a cover version of the song, re-titled "All Together Now (Strong Together)", for the Goleo VI Presents His 2006 FIFA World Cup Hits album, a collection of collaborations´that were released in connection with the 2006 FIFA World Cup, held from 9 June to 9 July 2006 in Germany. As with most songs on the album, FIFA mascot Goleo VI is also credited as an artist on "All Together Now". The remake features slightly re-written lyrics by Nicole Tyler, Wolfgang Boss, and Reinhard Raith, while production was overseen by Raith along with Andreas Litterscheid.

=== Chart performance ===
"All Together Now (Strong Together)" was only released in German-speaking Europe. It debuted and peaked at number 16 in Germany and spent nine weeks on the German Singles Chart, becoming Atomic Kitten's fifth highest-charting single over there as well as their highest-charting since "If You Come to Me" (2003). Elsewhere, the song peaked at number 35 in Austria, also reaching number 42 in Switzerland.

=== Music video ===
The animated music video shows the World Cup mascots Goleo and Pille travelling around the world until they eventually arrive to Berlin's Olympic Stadium, the setting of the 2006 FIFA World Cup Final.

=== Track listing ===
CD maxi single
| No. | Title | Writer(s) | Producer(s) | Length |
|---|---|---|---|---|
| 1. | "All Together Now (Strong Together)" (Radio Edit) | Nicole Tyler; Peter Hooton; Steve Grimes; Wolfgang Boss; Reinhard Raith | Andreas Litterscheid; Reinhard Raith | 3:08 |
| 2. | "All Together Now (Strong Together)" (Corenell Radio Remix) | Tyler; Hooton; Grimes; Boss; Raith | Litterscheid; Raith; Corenell^{[a]} | 2:54 |
| 3. | "All Together Now (Strong Together)" (Corenell Club Remix) | Tyler; Hooton; Grimes; Boss; Raith | Litterscheid; Raith; Corenell^{[a]} | 7:06 |
| 4. | "Bamboo" (Goleo's Dance Mix) | Nadir Khayat; Bilal Hajji | Litterscheid; Raith | 3:10 |

Notes

- ^{^[a]} denotes additional producer

=== Charts ===
| Chart (2006) | Peak position |
|---|---|
| Austria (Ö3 Austria Top 40) | 35 |
| Germany (GfK) | 16 |
| Switzerland (Schweizer Hitparade) | 42 |

== Peace Collective version ==
On the 100th anniversary of the Christmas Day Truce, during World War One, which inspired the Farm's 1990 hit "All Together Now", many of the UK's biggest music stars united as the Peace Collective, to re-record the song for charity. The new track featured a backing choir of schoolboy footballers from the Premier League and German Bundesliga. All profits from the release, on 15 December, went to the British Red Cross and the Shorncliffe Trust.

Produced and recorded by Simon Britton and Jon Moon at Sensible Music in Islington (London), the 2014 version included Gorgon City, Clean Bandit, Gabrielle, Alexandra Burke, Engelbert Humperdinck, Julian Lennon, David Gray, Guy Chambers, Amelle Berrabah, Alison Levi, Mick Jones (the Clash), The Voice 2014 winner Jermain Jackman, Massive Attack's Shara Nelson and more. The 2014 version reached number one on the UK Independent Singles Breakers Chart on 19 December and number 70 on the UK Singles Chart.

== See also ==
- List of anti-war songs
