= Sinful! =

Single by Pete Wylie

from the album Sinful
- B-side: "I Want the Moon, Mother"
- Released: 1986
- Genre: New wave
- Length: 4:11
- Label: MDM Records; Eternal
- Songwriter: Pete Wylie
- Producers: Pete Wylie; Ian Ritchie

Pete Wylie singles chronology
"Weekends (as The Mighty Wah!)" (1984)	"Sinful!" (1986)	"Diamond Girl" (1986)

"Sinful!" is the 1986 debut solo single by English musician Pete Wylie, from his 1987 debut album of the same name. It was produced by Wylie and Ian Ritchie, and features vocals from Josie Jones. The song reached No. 13 in both the UK and Ireland. It also peaked at No. 26 on the US Billboard Hot Dance Club Play chart in 1987, and was Wylie's only chart entry in the United States.

In 1991, a version with the Farm titled "Sinful! (Scary Jiggin' with Doctor Love)" was released and reached No. 28 in the UK and No. 25 in Ireland.

== Track listing ==
- 7" single

A. "Sinful!"
B. "I Want the Moon, Mother"

- 12" single

A. "Sinful!" (Tribal Mix)
B1. "Sinful!"
B2. "I Want the Moon, Mother"

== Charts ==
"Sinful!"

Chart (1986)	Peak position
Australia (Kent Music Report)	69
Ireland (Irish Singles Chart)	13
UK Singles (OCC)	13
US Billboard Hot Dance Club Play	26

"Sinful! (Scary Jiggin' with Doctor Love)"

Chart (1991)	Peak position
Ireland (Irish Singles Chart)	25
UK Singles (OCC)	28
UK Airplay (Music Week)	22
