= Pete Heller =

British musician

Background information
- Born: 13 February 1959 (age 67)
- Origin: Brighton, England
- Genres: Electronic; house
- Occupations: Disc jockey; record producer; radio presenter
- Years active: 1996–present

Pete Heller is an English electronic DJ and house music producer.

== Biography ==
He is recognised in the dance community for his solo work, and his remixes with frequent collaborator Terry Farley. As a duo, they have released popular tunes under the names Heller & Farley Project (or Farley & Heller), Fire Island plus The Look and Feel. In 1996, they released "Ultra Flava", a No. 3 hit on the US Billboard Hot Dance Music/Club Play chart. The track also peaked at No. 22 on the UK Singles Chart. In 2000, he remixed Moby's song "South Side".

On his own, Heller hit No. 1 on the US Hot Dance Music/Club Play chart with "Big Love", which held the top spot for three weeks and also was ranked by Billboard as the #1 dance song of 1999. The same track peaked at No. 12 in the UK.

In addition, Heller remixed the Chemical Brothers' 2002 release "Star Guitar".

In 2004, Heller launched his own record label, Phela Recordings, as a platform for his own productions and collaborations with other artists.

== Discography ==
=== Singles ===
- 1999 Pete Heller – Atlanta
- 1999 Pete Heller – Big Love (Pete Heller Original Mix)
- 2003 Pete Heller & Tedd Patterson – Big Room Drama

=== Remixes ===
- 1990 Saint Etienne – "Let's Kiss and Make Up" (Midsummer Madness Mix)
- 1991 Pete Wylie and The Farm – Sinful! sinfarlEy + hEllErEmix
- 1992 Felix – Don't You Want Me
- 1997 Michael Jackson – "Money (Fire Island Radio Edit)"
- 1999 Par Ney De Castro – Ba-Tu-Ca-Da! – (Pete Heller Big Love From Rio Mix)
- 1999 Jamiroquai – Supersonic (Pete Heller – The Love Mix)
- 2000 Satoshi Tomiie – Come To Me (Pete Heller Remix)
- 2000 Moby – South Side (Pete Heller Park Lane Vocal)
- 2001 Daft Punk – Harder, Better, Faster, Stronger (Pete Heller's Stylus Mix)
- 2001 Fatboy Slim – Song for Shelter (Pete Heller's Stylus Style Edit)
- 2002 The Chemical Brothers – Star Guitar (Pete Heller's Expanded Mix)

== See also ==
- List of number-one dance hits (United States)
- List of artists who reached number one on the US Dance chart
