= Fire Island (duo) =

English house music duo

- Also known as: Pete Heller and Terry Farley, Heller & Farley, Heller & Farley Project, Farley & Heller, Roach Motel, Product of da Neighbourhood, Soft Black
- Origin: Brighton, England
- Genres: Electronic; house
- Years active: 1992–present
- Label: Defected Records

Fire Island are an English house music duo, made up of producers and remixers Pete Heller and Terry Farley. Both are prolific musicians who have an extensive list of remixes to their credit, using the Fire Island moniker and also being billed as Heller & Farley Project, Roach Motel or Farley & Heller.

As Fire Island, they hit number one on the US Hot Dance Music/Club Play chart in 1998 with "Shout to the Top", a song originally recorded by the Style Council in 1984 and with lead vocals supplied by Loleatta Holloway. It also peaked at number 23 on the UK Singles Chart. The duo also had a hit single on both charts in 1992 with "In Your Bones / Fire Island" (the latter featuring Ricardo da Force).

They collaborated with Michael Jackson for the song "Money", which appeared on the album Blood on the Dance Floor: HIStory in the Mix, as well as providing a remix for the title song.

== Charted singles ==
- "In Your Bones / Fire Island" (1992) - UK #66
- "There But for the Grace of God" (1994) - UK #32
- "If You Should Need a Friend" (1995) - UK #51
- "White Powder Dreams" (1997) - UK #127
- "Shout to the Top" (featuring Loleatta Holloway) (1998) - UK #23
