= Peter Hooton =

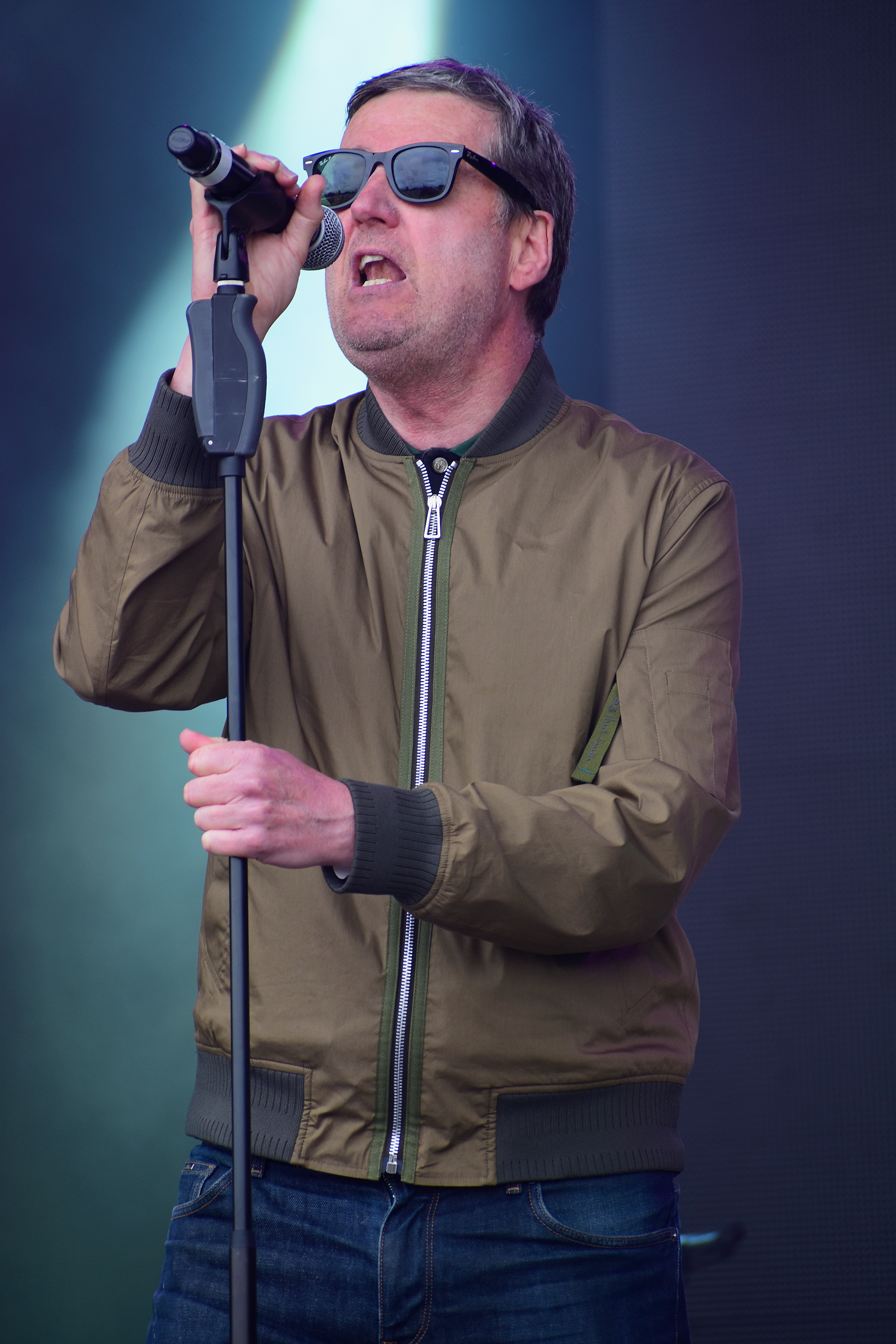
- Peter Hooton performing live at Let's Rock Liverpool, 31 July 2021. Photograph by Andrew D. Hurley

Background information
- Born: Peter Joseph Hooton; 28 September 1962 (age 64); Everton, Liverpool, England
- Origin: Liverpool, England
- Occupation: Singer
- Instrument: Vocals
- Years active: 1981–present

Peter Joseph Hooton (born 28 September 1962 ) is the vocalist of Liverpool-based group the Farm. He was also its sole founder member in 1983, overseeing its rise to prominence with two top 10 singles in 1990, its breakup in 1996 and reformation in 2004.

== Biography ==
Hooton was born in Everton. In about 1980, he landed a job as a youth worker in Cantril Farm estate. The band's name comes from a farm that they used to rehearse in in Melling.

In 1981, Hooton was the founding editor of The End, a music and football fanzine aimed at young, working-class readers and initially inspired by an anarchist zine attacking that year's royal wedding. It marked the start of a long career writing about football, music, and working class culture in Liverpool. He is a supporter of local club Liverpool F.C.

Hooton is a committee member of Spirit of Shankly, a Liverpool Football Club supporters union, which was created in 2008 with the aims of ousting the club's controversial owners Tom Hicks and George N. Gillett, Jr. and protecting the rights of Liverpool supporters. Hooton appeared on a BBC Radio 5 Live discussion about the future of football in Liverpool in April 2010. He has also been a vocal supporter and sometime spokesman for campaigns in Liverpool to boycott the Sun newspaper over its coverage of the Hillsborough Disaster.

In 2015, Hooton, who has a degree in economics and public policy and a Post-Graduate Certificate in Education, was awarded an honorary degree by Edge Hill University.

Hooton has been a spokesperson for boycotts of The Sun following its coverage of the Hillsborough disaster. In November 2019, along with 34 other musicians, Hooton signed a letter endorsing the Labour Party leader Jeremy Corbyn in the 2019 UK general election with a call to end austerity.

In July 2025 Hooton's son Thomas was convicted of running a UK wide drugs supply organisation after being identified on a messaging service due to him discussing his famous father.
