= Cosmic (novel) =

2008 novel by Frank Cottrell-Boyce

- First edition cover
- Author: Frank Cottrell-Boyce
- Publisher: Walden Pond Press
- Publication date: January 1, 2010
- Pages: 320
- ISBN: 978-0-06-183683-1

Cosmic is a 2008 young adult novel by Frank Cottrell-Boyce. It received positive reception upon release.

== Synopsis ==
Liam is a twelve-year-old boy who, after undergoing a growth spurt, is tall enough that he is often mistaken for an adult. That, combined with his intelligence and charisma, regularly gets him in trouble. He finds himself invited on a father-child space trip (with his friend Florida posing as his daughter) and must learn about responsibility and parenthood to supervise the other children on the journey.

== Development history ==
Boyce claimed, in an interview with Publishers Weekly, that he was inspired to write the book by his childhood dream of wanting to go to space and by observing one of his son's friends experience a growth spurt.

In May 2010, The Hollywood Reporter reported that the book was being adapted for the screen by Walden Media, with Boyce to write the screenplay.

=== Publication history ===
Cosmic was published in the United Kingdom by Macmillan in 2008. It was published in the United States by Walden Pond Press on January 1, 2010. It received an audiobook release by Harper Audio, read by Kirby Heyborne, on January 19, 2010.

== Reception ==
The novel received positive reception upon release. Charlie Higson, writing in The Guardian, positively described the book as "rather moving." Kirkus Reviews and Publishers Weekly both published starred reviews, with the former praising the novel's plot and humor and the latter complimenting the story's themes and "examination of 'dadliness.'" The Horn Book Magazine noted the book's "likable characters" and "gentle sense of humor," while the The Bulletin of the Center for Children's Books positively compared the book to the works of Roald Dahl.

The novel was shortlisted for the Guardian Children's Fiction Prize in 2008.

The audiobook release also received positive reviews, with Kirkus and Booklist both complimenting Heyborne's narration.
