= Walden Pond Press =

HarperCollins' imprint of children's books

- Parent company: HarperCollins and Walden Media
- Founded: 2008; 18 years ago
- Country of origin: United States
- Headquarters location: New York City
- Official website: http://www.harperchildrens.com http://www.walden.com/books

Walden Pond Press, established in 2008, is the co-publishing venture of film production company Walden Media and book publisher HarperCollins. The venture operates as an imprint of HarperCollins Children's Books, and its logo, a skipping stone on Walden Pond, is derivative of the Walden Media logo.

== Background ==
Walden Pond Press publishes "middle-grade classics". For example, Root Magic (2021) by Eden Royce and The Troubled Girls of Dragomir Academy (2021) by Anne Ursu were both published by Walden Media.

== Audience ==
Walden Pond Press publishes a small, targeted list of middle grade book titles every year. Notable titles include Cosmic by Frank Cottrell-Boyce (2010); The Fourth Stall by Chris Rylander (2011); Breadcrumbs by Anne Ursu (2011); The Hero’s Guide series by Christopher Healy (2012–2015); Ms. Bixby’s Last Day by John David Anderson (2016); National Book Award longlist nominees The Real Boy by Anne Ursu (2013) and Orphan Island by Laurel Snyder (2017); A Boy Called Bat and sequels by Elana K. Arnold (2017–2020); York: The Shadow Cipher and sequels by Laura Ruby (2019–2021); Love Sugar Magic and sequels by Anna Meriano (2018–2020); and A Perilous Journey of Danger & Mayhem: The Dastardly Plot and sequels by Christopher Healy (2018–2020), among others.

== Prior partnership ==
Walden Pond Press is Walden Media's second co-publishing venture with a major US publishing house. From 2004 to 2008 Walden Media worked across all imprints at Penguin Young Readers Group, publishing the Newbery Honor-winning Savvy by first-time author Ingrid Law (Dial/Walden Media), Mike Lupica's The Comeback Kids series (Philomel/Walden Media), Lauren St John's The White Giraffe series (Dial/Walden Media), and Michael Reisman's Simon Bloom series (Dutton/Walden Media), among other titles.

== Authors ==
The publisher has published books by authors including Paul Adam, Steven Knight, Anne Ursu, Kevin Emerson, Jarrett J. Krosoczka, John David Anderson, Frank Cottrell-Boyce, Elana K. Arnold, Laura Ruby, and Laurel Snyder.

== Walden Pond Press publishing history ==
Year	Title	Author	Publication Date
2023	No One Leaves the Castle	Christopher Healy	August 15, 2023
2023	Conjure Island	Eden Royce	June 23. 2023
2023	The Greatest Kid in the World	John David Anderson	June 13, 2023
2023	The Witch of Woodland	Laurel Snyder	May 16, 2023
2023	Harriet Spies	Elana K. Arnold	February 7, 2023
2022	Homebound	John David Anderson	August 22, 2022
2022	The Hurricanes of Weakerville	Chris Rylander	June 28, 2022
2022	Drifters	Kevin Emerson	May 10, 2022
2022	Just Harriet	Elana K. Arnold	February 1, 2022
2022	Riley's Ghost	John David Anderson	January 11, 2022
2021	The Troubled Girls of Dragomir Academy	Anne Ursu	October 12, 2021
2021	Stowaway	John David Anderson	August 3. 2021
2021	Hollow Chest	Brita Sandstrom	June 8, 2021
2021	The House That Wasn't There	Elana K. Arnold	March 30, 2021
2021	The In-Between	Rebecca K. S. Ansari	January 26, 2021
2021	Root Magic	Eden Royce	January 5, 2021
2020	A Perilous Journey of Danger and Mayhem #3	Christopher Healy	December 1, 2020
2020	York: The Map of Stars	Laura Ruby	May 1, 2020
2020	One Last Shot	John David Anderson	May 5, 2020
2020	Love Sugar Magic: A Mixture of Mischief	Anna Meriano	February 4, 2020
2019	A Perilous Journey of Danger and Mayhem #2	Christopher Healy	November 5, 2019
2019	My Jasper June	Laurel Snyder	September 3, 2019
2019	Two Truths and a Lie: Forces of Nature	Ammi-Joan Paquette and Laurie Ann Thompson	June 25, 2019
2019	York: The Clockwork Ghost	Laura Ruby	May 14, 2019
2019	Finding Orion	John David Anderson	May 7, 2019
2019	Bat and the End of Everything	Elana K. Arnold	March 26, 2019
2019	The Missing Piece of Charles O'Reilly	Rebecca K. S. Ansari	March 5, 2019
2019	The Shores Beyond Time	Kevin Emerson	February 12, 2019
2019	The Lost Girl	Anne Ursu	February 12, 2019
2019	Love Sugar Magic: A Sprinkle of Spirits	Anna Meriano	February 5, 2019
2018	A Perilous Journey of Danger and Mayhem #1	Christopher Healy	September 25, 2018
2018	The Treasure of Mad Doc Magee	Elinor Teele	August 21, 2018
2018	Two Truths and a Lie: Histories and Mysteries	Ammi-Joan Paquette and Laurie Ann Thompson	June 26, 2018
2018	Bat and the Waiting Game	Elana K. Arnold	March 27, 2018
2018	Granted	John David Anderson	February 13, 2018
2018	The Oceans Between Stars	Kevin Emerson	February 12, 2018
2018	Love Sugar Magic: A Dash of Trouble	Anna Meriano	January 2, 2018
2017	The Sea of The Dead	Barry Wolverton	December 12, 2017
2017	Two Truths and a Lie: It's Alive	Ammi-Joan Paquette and Laurie Ann Thompson	June 27, 2017
2017	Sputnik's Guide to Life on Earth	Frank Cottrell-Boyce	June 20, 2017
2017	Orphan Island	Laurel Snyder	May 30, 2017
2017	York: The Shadow Cipher	Laura Ruby	May 16, 2017
2017	Posted	John David Anderson	May 2, 2017
2017	Guys Read: Heroes and Villains	Jon Scieszka	April 4, 2017
2017	A Boy Called Bat	Elana K. Arnold	March 14, 2017
2017	Last Day on Mars	Kevin Emerson	February 14, 2017
2016	The Dragon's Gate	Barry Wolverton	November 1, 2016
2016	Ms. Bixby's Last Day	John David Anderson	June 21, 2016
2016	The Mechanical Mind of John Coggins	Elinor Teele	April 12, 2016
2016	Crisis Zero	Chris Rylander	February 2, 2016
2015	The Astounding Broccoli Boy	Frank Cottrell-Boyce	September 8, 2015
2015	The Vanishing Island	Barry Wolverton	September 1, 2015
2015	Guys Read: Terrifying Tales	Jon Scieszka	September 1, 2015
2015	The Dungeoneers	John David Anderson	June 23, 2015
2015	Platypus Police Squad: Last Panda Standing	Jarrett J. Krosoczka	May 5, 2015
2015	Countdown Zero	Chris Rylander	February 3, 2015
2014	Guys Read: True Stories	Jon Scieszka	September 16, 2014
2014	Disappearance at Hangman's Creek	John Thompson	September 2, 2014
2014	Minion	John David Anderson	June 24, 2014
2014	Platypus Police Squad: The Ostrich Conspiracy	Jarrett J. Krosoczka	May 6, 2014
2014	The Hero's Guide to Being An Outlaw	Christopher Healy	April 29, 2014
2014	The Dyerville Tales	M. P. Kozlowski	April 22, 2014
2014	Codename Zero	Chris Rylander	February 4, 2014
2013	The Real Boy	Anne Ursu	September 24, 2013
2013	Guys Read: Other Worlds	Jon Scieszka	September 17, 2013
2013	Sidekicked	John David Anderson	June 23, 2013
2013	Platypus Police Squad: The Frog Who Croaked	Jarrett J. Krosoczka	May 7, 2013
2013	The Girl from Felony Bay	John Thompson	April 30, 2013
2013	The Hero's Guide to Storming The Castle	Christopher Healy	April 29, 2013
2013	The Fellowship for Alien Detection	Kevin Emerson	February 26, 2013
2013	The Fourth Stall Part III	Chris Rylander	February 5, 2013
2012	Guys Read: The Sports Pages	Jon Scieszka	July 10, 2012
2012	The Mask of Destiny	Richard Newsome	May 15, 2012
2012	The Hero's Guide to Saving Your Kingdom	Christopher Healy	May 1, 2012
2012	Neversink	Barry Wolverton	March 27, 2012
2012	The Fourth Stall Part II	Chris Rylander	May 1, 2012
2011	Breadcrumbs	Anne Ursu	September 27, 2011
2011	Guys Read: Thriller	Jon Scieszka	September 20, 2011
2011	Juniper Berry	M. P. Kozlowski	April 26, 2011
2011	The Fourth Stall	Chris Rylander	February 8, 2011
2010	Guys Read: Funny Business	Jon Scieszka	September 21, 2010
2010	The Last Words of Will Wolfkin	Steven Knight	May 25, 2010
2010	The Billionaire's Curse	Richard Newsome	May 18, 2010
2010	Cosmic	Frank Cottrell-Boyce	January 19, 2010
