= Cary Granat =

American film producer

Cary Granat is an American film producer and studio executive. He was co-founder and CEO of Walden Media from 2000 to 2009, and president and COO of Miramax Films’ Dimension Division from 1995 to 2000. While at Walden Media, Granat secured the rights to C.S. Lewis’ Chronicles of Narnia series and oversaw production on the first film of the franchise, The Lion, The Witch, and the Wardrobe. Granat's other films include Scream, Journey to the Center of the Earth, Scary Movie, Amazing Grace, and Spy Kids.

== Education ==
Granat went to Tufts University from 1986-1990. Granat helped to establish the Communications and Media Studies School and is on its board.

== Career ==
Granat worked at MCA/Universal first as director of development from 1992 to 1995. He worked on films such as Babe and Casino, as well as acquired the original Meet the Parents, a Gregg Glienna film, for remake. While working in the film group under Hal Lieberman and Casey Silver, Granat also found himself evaluating corporate deals for the company.

After Universal, Granat joined Dimension Films as head of creative and then later as president and COO from 1995 to 2000. Granat worked closely with and for Bob Weinstein to build Dimension. This includes the Scream franchise, the Wayans' Scary Movie franchise and Dimension's launch of Robert Rodriguez's Spy Kids franchise. During this time Dimension re-established the studio system of the 1930s and '40s, with Guillermo del Toro, Robert Rodriguez, Wes Craven, Kevin Williamson, Ehren Kruger, and Ben Affleck. In addition to films, Dimension established the alliance of Sony and Capitol/EMI in the formation of Miramax/Dimension Records.

In 2000, Granat co-founded Walden Media. He served as CEO from 2000 to 2009. As CEO, Granat gained the rights to C.S. Lewis’ Chronicles of Narnia series and oversaw production on the first film of the franchise, The Lion, The Witch, and the Wardrobe—one of the highest-grossing films of 2005. The Narnia franchise has generated over $1.62 billion in theatrical gross on its first three installments. In addition to the Chronicles of Narnia, Granat produced the Journey to the Center of the Earth franchise, Charlotte’s Web, James Cameron’s Aliens of the Deep, Ghosts of the Abyss, Bridge to Terabithia, Holes, and over 50 other children's films and books. Granat built out Walden's film, educational, and faith activities locally in the U.K., Australia, New Zealand, South Korea, France, Germany, Japan, and other foreign markets. In addition to his duties as CEO, Granat was appointed in April 2004 as president of Anschutz Film Group, whereby the company acquired Crusader Entertainment and supervised the completion of the biography Ray and the Matthew McConaughey film, Sahara. In 2005, Granat received the P.T. Barnum Award from Tufts University for his exceptional work in the field of media and entertainment. After Granat and team produced Amazing Grace, he and company co-founder Michael Flaherty earned the John Templeton Foundation Epiphany Prize.

From 2010 to 2014, Granat was a partner at Reel FX/Granat Ent. The production and development company, Granat Entertainment, merged with animation studio Reel FX in order to create a new live-action/animation studio. The company forged partnerships with Andrew Adamson, Guillermo Del Toro, James Cameron, Cirque du Soleil, Fox Film, Steve Aoki and others while producing Free Birds, The Book of Life, World Away, and The Hive.

In 2012, Granat co-founded and launched Immersive Artistry, an entertainment business. The company is a participatory experience considered the newest evolution in media placing you inside the movie, rather than watching it. The company will be launching its first locations in Las Vegas, China, and throughout the world in 2019. Granat serves as the company CEO.

In 2014, Granat founded EMH Consulting Group, Inc., a Consultancy and Film Operations group that represent Foreign Governments in their effort to build and/or rebuild their film and television operations.

Effective September 28, 2026, Granat has been appointed as the Dean of the Moody College of Communication at the University of Texas at Austin, where he succeeds Interim Dean Anita Vangelisti. Granat's previous academic experience includes time as an instructor at Bar-Ilan University and as a board member of the Film and Media Studies Program at Tufts University.

== Activism ==
Granat is a board member of the World Information Transfer of the United Nations and organizes an annual conference on Children's Health and the Environment every December. In 2004, Granat co-founded The Forgotten Dog Foundation, a dog rescue foundation specializing in emergency medical needs.

== Awards ==
- Common Sense Media Award.

== Filmography ==
Year	Film	Studio	Revenue
1996	Hellraiser: Bloodline	Dimension	$9,336,886
1996	Scream	Dimension	$173,046,663
1997	Mimic	Dimension	$25,480,490
1997	Scream 2	Dimension	$172,363,301
1998	Senseless	Dimension	$12,874,899
1998	Nightwatch	Dimension	$1,179,002
1998	Halloween H20: 20 Years Later	Dimension	$55,041,738
1999	Teaching Mrs. Tingle	Dimension	$8,951,935
2000	Scream 3	Dimension	$161,834,276
2000	Reindeer Games	Dimension	$32,168,970
2000	Scary Movie	Dimension	$278,019,771
2000	Highlander: Endgame	Dimension	$15,843,608
2001	The Others	Dimension	$209,947,037
2001	Spy Kids	Dimension	$147,934,180
2002	Pulse: A Stomp Odyssey	Walden	$10,086,514
2004	Around the World in 80 Days	Walden	$72,178,895
2005	Aliens of the Deep	Walden	$12,770,637
2005	The Chronicles of Narnia: The Lion, the Witch and the Wardrobe	Walden	$745,013,115
2006	How to Eat Fried Worms	Walden	$13,096,314
2007	Mr. Magorium’s Wonder Emporium	Walden	$69,474,661
2007	The Water Horse	Walden	$103,071,443
2008	The Chronicles of Narnia: Prince Caspian	Walden	$419,665,568
2008	Journey to the Center of the Earth	Walden	$241,995,151
2009	This Is It	Sony	$261,183,588
2010	The Chronicles of Narnia: The Voyage of the Dawn Treader	Fox	$415,686,217
2014	The Book of Life	Fox	$99,783,556
2015	The Hive	Nerdist industries	-

== Sources ==
- Taddonio, Patrice (5 December 2005). "For Them, Filmmaking Is An Open Book". Profile: Walden Media. Tufts University. Archived from the original on 3 November 2009.
