= In Excelsis =

In Excelsis (Latin "on high") may refer to:

- In Excelsis, EP from Killing Joke discography
- "In Excelsis", by The Childrens Choir of Elbosco from Angelis (Hispavox, 1995)
- "In Excelsis", by Angra from Rebirth 2001
- "In Excelsis", by Azealia Banks from Fantasea II: The Second Wave 2018

== See also ==
- Gloria in excelsis Deo, Christian hymn
- In Excelsis Deo, episode of the first season of The West Wing
- Regnans in Excelsis
