= Max Cassidy =

Max Cassidy is the central character in a series of thrillers about a teenage escapologist by British author Paul Adam. The series is aimed primarily at Teen readers. By day, 14-year-old Max is a normal schoolboy, living in London with Consuela, his guardian, but by night he is a dare-devil performer, nicknamed the Half-Pint Houdini. Tough and resourceful, Max has a number of exceptional skills - he can pick locks, escape from handcuffs, chains and locked cabinets and hold his breath for three minutes - skills which he Max’s father, a world-famous escapologist, disappeared two years earlier in Central America. His body was never found but Max’s mother, Helen, was convicted of Alexander’s murder and is serving a twenty-year prison sentence. Convinced that his father is still alive, Max is determined to track him down – and get his mother out of prison.

== Books ==
The first book in the series, Escape from Shadow Island, was published in the United Kingdom in July, 2009, by Random House Children’s Books. The book was short-listed for five children’s book awards and was the winner of the Salford Children’s Book Award 2010. It has also been published in the United States by Walden Pond Press, an imprint of HarperCollins Publishers.

The second book in the series, Jaws of Death, was published in August 2011; followed by the third book, Dead Mans’ Bay, in January 2012.
