= List of awards and nominations received by Danny Boyle =

Danny Boyle awards and nominations
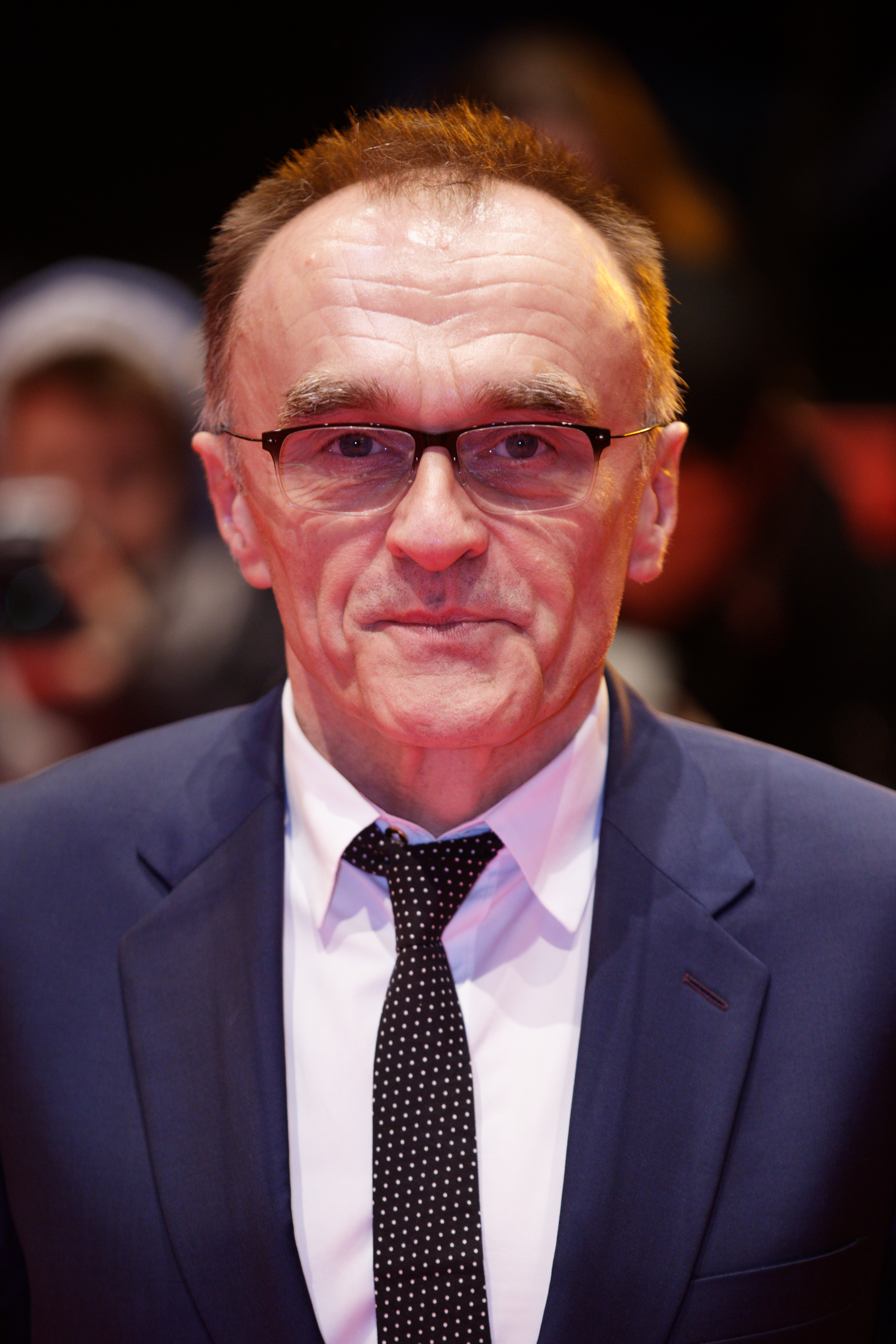
- Boyle in 2017
Awards and nominations
Award	Wins	Nominations
Academy Awards	1	3
BAFTA Awards	2	8
Critics' Choice	1	3
Emmy Awards	1	1
Golden Globes	1	2

Totals (Note: Certain award groups do not simply award one winner. They acknowledge several different recipients, have runners-up, and have third place. Since this is a specific recognition and is different from losing an award, runner-up mentions are considered wins in this award tally. For simplification and to avoid errors, each award in this list has been presumed to have had a prior nomination.)
- Wins: 6
- Nominations: 15

The following is a list of awards and nominations received Danny Boyle

Danny Boyle is an English film director, producer, screenwriter and theatre director. He has received various accolades including an Academy Award, two British Academy Film Awards, a Critics' Choice Movie Award, a Primetime Emmy Award and a Golden Globe Award. He also has received several honors including the Britannia Award in 2009 and the BFI Fellowship in 2010.

Boyle made his directorial film debut with the black comedy crime drama Shallow Grave (1994) which earned the BAFTA Award for Best British Film. He then directed another black comedy crime film Trainspotting (1996) which was nominated for two BAFTA Awards in 1996 for Outstanding British Film and John Hodge for Best Adapted Screenplay. He would later direct it's sequel T2 Trainspotting (2017) which received two BAFTA Scotland Awards. He received mixed notices for the romance A Life Less Ordinary (1997). He bounced back directing the adventure drama The Beach (2000) starring Leonardo DiCaprio which competed for the Golden Bear at the Berlin International Film Festival.

Boyle directed for the romance crime drama Slumdog Millionaire (2008), which earned him widespread acclaim as well as the Academy Award for Best Director, the BAFTA Award for Best Direction, the Critics' Choice Movie Award for Best Director, the Directors Guild of America Award for Outstanding Directing - Feature Film, and the Golden Globe Award for Best Director. He then directed the biographical survival drama 127 Hours (2010) which earned him two Academy Award nominations for Best Picture and Best Adapted Screenplay.

He directed the biographical drama Steve Jobs (2015), which received two Academy Award nominations for Best Actor for Michael Fassbender and Best Supporting Actress for Kate Winslet. He is set to direct the biographical drama Ink (2026), adapted from the 2017 stage play, about Rupert Murdoch. The film will compete for the Golden Lion at the Venice International Film Festival.

Boyle is also known for directing the post-apocalyptic horror drama 28 Days Later (2002), its sequel 28 Years Later (2025) and produced 28 Years Later: The Bone Temple (2026). He also directed the family comedy-drama Millions (2004), the science-fiction psychological film Sunshine (2007), the psychological thriller Trance (2013), and the romantic comedy fantasy Yesterday (2019).

In 2012, Boyle served as the artistic director for the 2012 Summer Olympics opening ceremony held in London, which received wide praise as a "masterpiece" and "a love letter to Britain". He won the Outstanding Art Direction for a Variety Program.

== Major associations ==
=== Academy Awards ===
Year	Category	Nominated work	Result	Ref.
2008	Best Director	Slumdog Millionaire	Won	
2010	Best Picture	127 Hours	Nominated	
2010	Best Adapted Screenplay	127 Hours	Nominated	

=== BAFTA Awards ===
Year	Category	Nominated work	Result	Ref.
British Academy Film Awards
1994	Outstanding British Film	Shallow Grave	Won	
1996	Outstanding British Film	Trainspotting	Nominated	
2008	Outstanding British Film	Slumdog Millionaire	Nominated	
2008	Best Direction	Slumdog Millionaire	Won	
2010	Outstanding British Film	127 Hours	Nominated	
2010	Best Direction	127 Hours	Nominated	
2010	Best Adapted Screenplay	127 Hours	Nominated	
2025	Outstanding British Film	28 Years Later	Nominated	
BAFTA Awards, Scotland
1996	Best Feature Film	Trainspotting	Won	
2017	Best Feature Film	T2 Trainspotting	Won	
2017	Best Director	T2 Trainspotting	Won	

=== Critics' Choice Awards ===
Year	Category	Nominated work	Result	Ref.
Critics' Choice Movie Awards
2008	Best Director	Slumdog Millionaire	Won	
2010	Best Director	127 Hours	Nominated	
2010	Best Adapted Screenplay	127 Hours	Nominated	

=== Emmy Awards ===
Year	Category	Nominated work	Result	Ref.
Primetime Emmy Awards
2013	Outstanding Art Direction for a Variety Program	London 2012 Olympic Games Opening Ceremony	Won	(Note: (tied with Saturday Night Live))

=== Golden Globe Awards ===
Year	Category	Nominated work	Result	Ref.
2009	Best Director	Slumdog Millionaire	Won	
2011	Best Screenplay	127 Hours	Nominated	

== Film critic awards ==
Year	Nominated work	Award	Result
2008	Chicago Film Critics Association Award for Best Director	Slumdog Millionaire	Won
2008	Dallas-Fort Worth Film Critics Association Award for Best Director	Slumdog Millionaire	Won
2008	Detroit Film Critics Society Award for Best Director	Slumdog Millionaire	Won
2008	Florida Film Critics Circle Award for Best Director	Slumdog Millionaire	Won
2008	London Film Critics' Circle Award for Best British Director of the Year	Slumdog Millionaire	Won
2008	Los Angeles Film Critics Association Award for Best Director	Slumdog Millionaire	Won
2008	New York Film Critics Online Award for Best Director	Slumdog Millionaire	Won
2008	Oklahoma Film Critics Circle Award for Best Director	Slumdog Millionaire	Won
2008	Phoenix Film Critics Society Award for Best Director	Slumdog Millionaire	Won
2008	San Diego Film Critics Society Award for Best Director	Slumdog Millionaire	Won
2008	Southeastern Film Critics Association Award for Best Director	Slumdog Millionaire	Won
2008	St. Louis Gateway Film Critics Association Award for Best Director	Slumdog Millionaire	Won
2008	Toronto International Film Festival People's Choice Award	Slumdog Millionaire	Won
2008	Washington D.C. Area Film Critics Association Award for Best Director	Slumdog Millionaire	Won

== Miscellaneous awards ==
Organizations	Year	Category	Work	Result	Ref.
Berlin International Film Festival	2000	Golden Bear	The Beach	Nominated	
British Independent Film Award	2008	Best Director	Slumdog Millionaire	Won	
Directors Guild of America Award	2008	Outstanding Directing in a Feature Film	Slumdog Millionaire	Won	
Empire Awards	1996	Best Director	Shallow Grave	Won	
Empire Awards	1997	Best Director	Trainspotting	Nominated	
Independent Spirit Awards	2010	Best Film	127 Hours	Nominated	
Independent Spirit Awards	2010	Best Director	127 Hours	Nominated	
Satellite Awards	2008	Best Director	Slumdog Millionaire	Won	
Venice International Film Festival	2026	Golden Lion	Ink	Pending	
Writers Guild of America Award	2010	Best Adapted Screenplay	127 Hours	Nominated	

== Honorary awards ==
Organizations	Year	Accolade	Result	Ref.
Britannia Awards	2009	Artistic Excellence	Honored	
British Film Institute	2010	BFI Fellowship	Honored	
Casting Society	2016	Career Achievement Award	Honored	
Empire Award	2013	Outstanding Contribution to Cinema	Honored	
Palm Springs International Film Festival	2011	Visionary Award	Honored	
Telluride Film Festival	2015	Silver Medallion Award	Honored	
