= Laurel Snyder =

American poet and writer (born 1974)

- Born: 1974 (age 51–52); Baltimore, Maryland, U.S.
- Education: University of Tennessee at Chattanooga; Iowa Writers' Workshop
- Occupation: Children's author
- Children: 2
- Website: laurelsnyder.com

Laurel Snyder (born 1974 in Baltimore) is an American poet and writer of children's books, including novels and picture books. She has also edited a number of literary journals and is a commentator for NPR's All Things Considered.

Snyder was born in Baltimore, Maryland, and holds degrees from the University of Tennessee at Chattanooga and the Iowa Writers' Workshop at the University of Iowa. She lives in Atlanta, Georgia, with her husband and children.

== Awards and honors ==
Twelve of Snyder's books are Junior Library Guild books: Any Which Wall (2009), Swan (2015), The Forever Garden (2017), Charlie & Mouse (2017), Orphan Island (2017), Charlie & Mouse & Grumpy (2017), Charlie & Mouse Even Better (2019), My Jasper June (2019), Charlie & Mouse Outdoors (2020), Charlie and Mouse Lost and Found (2021), Endlessly Ever After (2022), and Charlie & Mouse Are Magic (2022).

Swan was named one of the best books of 2016 by Bank Street College of Education.

Charlie and Mouse was named one of the best picture books of 2017 by the Chicago Public Library, New York Public Library, and The Washington Post.

Orphan Island was named one of the best books of the year by the Chicago Public Library.

My Jasper June was named one of the best books of the year by Publishers Weekly.

Awards for Snyder's writing
| Year | Title | Award | Result | Ref. |
|---|---|---|---|---|
| 2011 | Baxter, the Pig Who Wanted to be Kosher | Sydney Taylor Book Award for Younger Readers | Notable | |
| 2014 | The Longest Night | Sydney Taylor Book Award for Younger Readers | Winner | |
| 2015 | Swan | Golden Kite Award for Picture Books Text | Winner | |
| 2016 | Swan | ALSC Notable Children's Books | Selection | |
| 2016 | Swan | NCTE Orbis Pictus Award | Honor | |
| 2017 | Charlie & Mouse & Grumpy | Cybils Award for Easy Readers | Finalist | |
| 2017 | Orphan Island | National Book Award for Young People's Literature | Longlist | |
| 2018 | Charlie & Mouse | ALSC Notable Children's Books | Selection | |
| 2018 | Charlie & Mouse | Geisel Award | Winner | |

== Publications ==
=== Standalone books ===
- Daphne and Jim (2005, Burnside Review Press)
- The Myth of the Simple Machines (2007, No Tell Books)
- Inside the Slidy Diner (2008, Tricycle Press)
- Up and Down the Scratchy Mountains, or The Search for a Suitable Princess (2008, Random House Books for Young Readers)
- Any Which Wall, illustrated by LeUyen Pham (2009, Random House Books for Young Readers)
- Baxter, the Pig Who Wanted to Be Kosher (2010, Tricycle Press)
- Penny Dreadful, illustrated by Abigail Halpin (2010, Random House Books for Young)
- Bigger than a Bread Box (2011, Random House Books for Young Readers)
- Nosh, Schlep, Schluff: Babyiddish, illustrated by Tiphanie Beeke (2011, Random House Books for Young Readers)
- Good Night, laila tov, illustrated by Jui Ishida (2012, Random House Books for Young Readers)
- Camp Wonderful Wild, illustrated by Carlynn Whitt (2013, Two Lions)
- The Longest Night: A Passover Story, illustrated by Catia Chien (2013, Schwartz & Wade)
- Seven Stories Up (2014, Random House Books for Young Readers)
- Swan: The Life and Dance of Anna Pavlova, illustrated by Julie Morstad (2015, Chronicle Books)
- The Forever Garden (2017, Schwartz & Wade)
- The King of Too Many Things (2017, Rodale Kids)
- Orphan Island (2017, Walden Pond Press)
- Hungry Jim (2019, Chronicle Books)
- My Jasper June (2019, Walden Pond Press)
- Endlessly Ever After, illustrated by Dan Santat (2022, Chronicle Books)
- The Witch of Woodland (2023, Walden Pond Press)

=== Charlie & Mouse series ===
The Charlie & Mouse series is illustrated by Emily Hughes and published by Chronicle Books.

1. Charlie & Mouse (2017)
2. Charlie & Mouse & Grumpy (2017)
3. Charlie & Mouse Even Better (2019)
4. Charlie & Mouse Outdoors (2020)
5. Charlie & Mouse Lost and Found (2021)
6. Charlie & Mouse Are Magic (2022)

=== As editor ===
- Half/Life: Jew-ish Tales from Interfaith Homes (2006, Soft Skull Press)
