= John David Anderson =

American writer of middle-grade fiction

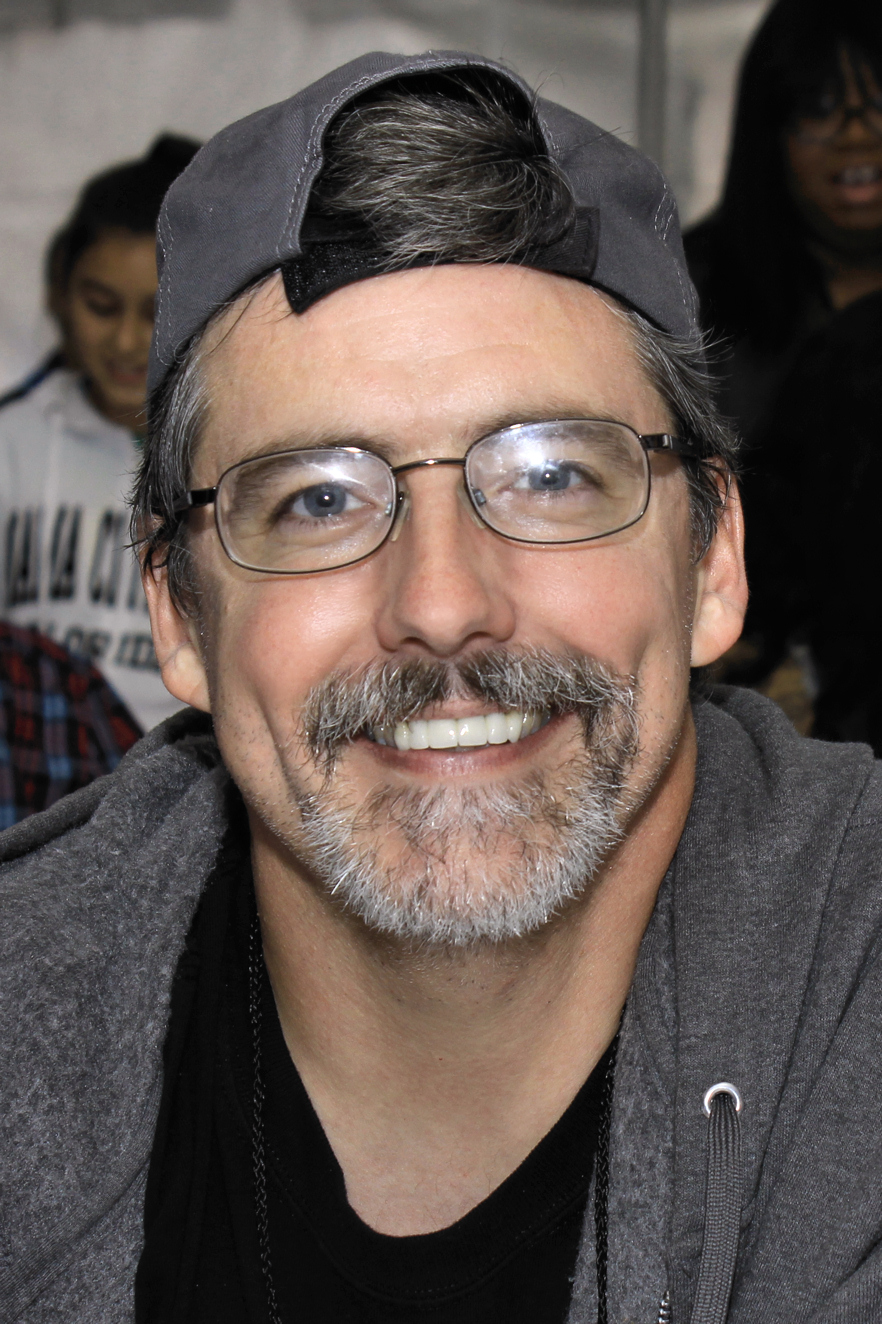
- Anderson at the 2016 Texas Book Festival
- Born: John David Anderson; May 21, 1975; Indianapolis, Indiana, U.S.
- Education: Indiana University; University of Illinois
- Occupation: Author
- Spouse: Alithia Anderson
- Writing career
- Language: English
- Genres: Action, Adventure, Fantasy
- Website: www.johndavidanderson.org

John David Anderson is an American writer of middle grade fiction. His works include Posted, Ms. Bixby's Last Day, Dive, Keep It Like A Secret, Stowaway, Homebound, One Last Shot, Riley's Ghost, Insert Coin to Continue, The Dungeoneers, Sidekicked, Minion, Granted, and Standard Hero Behavior.

== Life and career ==
Anderson was born and raised in Indianapolis, Indiana, where he currently resides. He is married to Alithea Anderson and is the father of twins.

Anderson attended Indiana University, where he received an undergraduate degree in English literature, and the University of Illinois, where he received a master's degree in the same. He is a full-time writer and frequent presenter at schools across the country. His books have been featured on many state and library reading lists.

== Works ==
- Standard Hero Behavior (2007). Clarion Books.
- Sidekicked (2013). Walden, HarperCollins.
- Minion (2014). Walden, HarperCollins.
- The Dungeoneers (2015). Walden, HarperCollins.
- Ms. Bixby's Last Day (2016). Walden, HarperCollins.
- Insert Coin to Continue (2016). Aladdin Books.
- Posted (2017). Walden, HarperCollins.
- Granted (2018). Walden, HarperCollins.
- Finding Orion (2019). Walden, HarperCollins.
- One Last Shot (2020). Walden, HarperCollins.
- Stowaway (2021). Walden, HarperCollins.
- Riley's Ghost (2022). Walden, HarperCollins.
- Homebound (2022). Walden, HarperCollins
- The Greatest Kid in the World (2023). Walden, HarperCollins
- Keep It Like a Secret (2024). Walden, HarperCollins.
- Dive (2025). Walden HarperCollins.
