= Root Magic =

2021 novel by Eden Royce

- First edition
- Author: Eden Royce
- Language: English
- Genre: Historical fiction/Children novel
- Set in: South Carolina
- Publisher: Walden Pond Books
- Publication date: January 5, 2021
- Publication place: United States of America
- Media type: Print (hardcover)
- Pages: 352
- ISBN: 978-0-06-289957-6

Root Magic is a children's novel by Eden Royce. It is her novel-length debut set in South Carolina. The first edition was published by Walden Pond Press, an imprint of HarperCollins, in 2021.
