= Framed (Cottrell-Boyce novel) =

Novel by Frank Cottrell Boyce

- First edition (publ. HarperCollins)
- Author: Frank Cottrell-Boyce
- Publisher: HarperCollins
- ISBN: 0-060-73403-5

Framed is a 2005 children's novel by English writer Frank Cottrell-Boyce. It was shortlisted for the Carnegie Medal, Whitbread Children's Book of the Year, Guardian Children's Fiction Prize, and Blue Peter Book Award.

The novel takes its setting from a true-life event, when the Manod (Cwt-y-Bugail) quarry at Blaenau Ffestiniog was used to store art treasures from the National Gallery and the Tate Gallery during World War II.

== Summary ==
Framed, set in North Wales, is the story of how paintings moved from the National Gallery in London affect the quiet town of Manod.

It follows Dylan Hughes, the only boy in Manod, who knows nothing about art and cares much more about the Teenage Mutant Ninja Turtles and cars. He and his family live and work in the town's garage and petrol station. He lives with his mam, his dad, his older sister Marie, his younger sister Minnie, who is obsessed with crime, and his baby brother Max.

Manod is depicted as a quiet town in decline, and many residents move away early in the book. Many of the men, including Dylan's dad, go away to London to work on the Thames Barrier, leaving the Hughes family to try to keep the garage open under lots of financial stress. They manage to foster a good relationship with workers from the National Gallery, who are storing and guarding the entire Gallery's collection in the mountain just up the road from the garage. Quentin Lester, the head of the Gallery's operations in Manod, takes a shine to Dylan when he mistakes his admiration for the Teenage Mutant Ninja Turtles (Leonardo, Donatello, Rafael, and Michelangelo) with a passion for the Renaissance painters of the same names.

Dylan's relationship with Lester opens up the whole town to the paintings of the Gallery's collection, and inspires the townspeople to take action in the community to make the world more colourful and exciting. Tom, who also works in the garage, is inspired by Luiz Meléndez's Still Life With Oranges to create still life scenes in shop windows across the town. The Umbrellas by Pierre-Auguste Renoir snaps Dylan's mam out of her depression and inspires her to create a 'psychedelic boa constrictor' procession of people with umbrellas during the daily school run. Claude Monet's Bathers at La Grenouillère inspires Mr. Davies, the town's butcher, to refurbish and re-open Manod's boating lake, which becomes a busy community hub.

Recognising the impact on the town and Dylan's family's connection with the art, Lester arranges to show one artwork a week in the forecourt of the garage before they go down to the Gallery in London. The garage becomes a popular spot for the town and they begin to earn more money. The existence of the valuable paintings on the property, however, increases the garage's insurance premiums, and they are forced to close down.

Dylan's sister Minnie suggests that they steal Vincent Van Gogh's Sunflowers, the most valuable painting in the collection, and ransom it back to Lester for £25 Million, in order to get the garage back open again. They manage to break into the mountain complex, and swap it out for a collage that their sister Marie made of their baby brother, Max. They hide Sunflowers behind a painting of their elderly neighbour as a young woman, but she comes to the garage and sells the painting (with Sunflowers concealed in the frame) to Lester at a car boot sale. Lester reveals that the painting is not of their neighbour, but is in fact A Greek Captive by Henriette Browne, and was stolen from the collection last time the paintings were stored in Manod, during World War II. Minnie reveals that Sunflowers is hidden in the frame, and they admit that they were only stealing it because the garage could no longer pay their insurance because of the paintings. Lester offers to pay their insurance from the Gallery's community relations fund.

Instead of Sunflowers, Marie's collage of Max is shown in the National Gallery, and after seeing it, Dylan's dad returns to Manod.

== Paintings Featured in the Book ==
The book heavily features real paintings from the National Gallery's collection, which inspire the people of Manod. Below is a list in order of appearance.

- The Manchester Madonna by Michelangelo
- Still Life With Oranges and Fruit by Luiz Meléndez
- The Ugly Duchess by Quinten Matsys
- The Umbrellas by Pierre-Auguste Renoir
- The Wilton Diptych
- A Greek Captive by Henriette Browne
- The Arnolfini Portrait by Jan van Eyck
- by Claude Monet
- The Ambassadors by Hans Holbein the Younger
- Sunflowers by Vincent Van Gogh

== Reception ==
Framed is a Junior Library Guild book. Both the book and audiobook received starred reviews from Publishers Weekly. Booklist also reviewed the book and audiobook.

Awards for Framed
| Year | Award | Result | Ref. |
|---|---|---|---|
| 2005 | Carnegie Medal | Shortlist | |
| 2005 | Whitbread Children's Book of the Year | Shortlist | |
| 2006 | Guardian Children's Fiction Prize | Shortlist | |
| 2007 | Blue Peter Book Award | Shortlist | |

== Television film adaptation ==
Framed was produced as an adult television film by the BBC, starring Trevor Eve and Eve Myles, and adapted by the author. It was first shown on 31 August 2009.
