= Danny Boyle =

English filmmaker (born 1956)

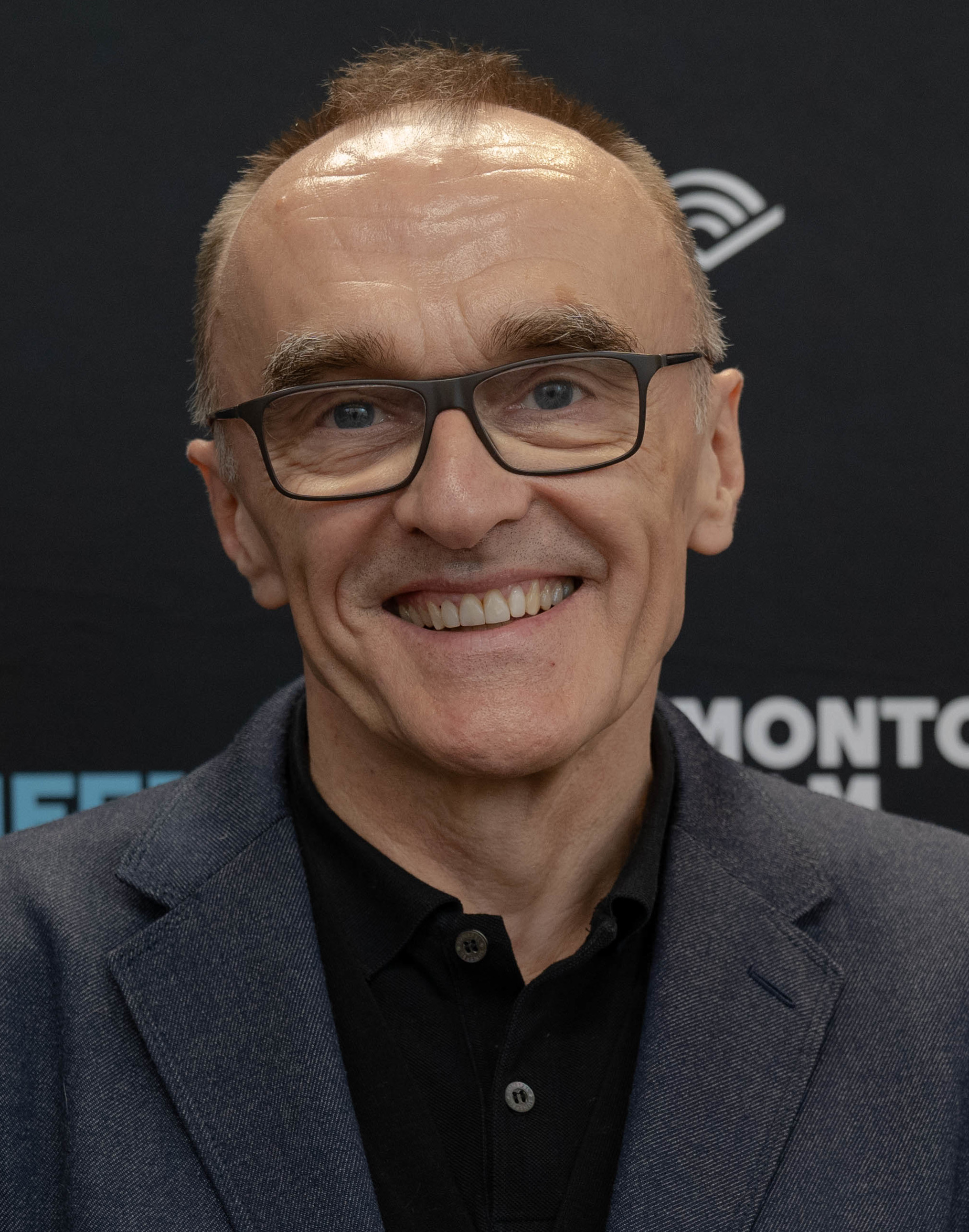
- Boyle in 2019
- Born: Daniel Francis Boyle; 20 October 1956 (age 70); Radcliffe, Lancashire, England
- Education: Thornleigh Salesian College; University College of North Wales
- Occupations: Director; producer
- Years active: 1980–present
- Awards: Full list

Daniel Francis Boyle (born 20 October 1956) is an English film director and producer. He has been described by the British Film Institute as "one of the liveliest and most unpredictable of British directors, adept at shifting genres and bringing a personal quality to whatever he tackles". He has received various accolades including an Academy Award, two BAFTA Awards, a Golden Globe Award and a Primetime Emmy Award.

His debut film was Shallow Grave (1994), followed by Trainspotting (1996), the former of which earned the BAFTA Award for Best British Film. Boyle directed the drama Slumdog Millionaire (2008), which earned him the Academy Award, BAFTA Award, and Golden Globe Award for Best Director. He was further Oscar-nominated for the survival drama 127 Hours (2010). He also directed The Beach (2000), 28 Days Later (2002), its sequel 28 Years Later (2025), Sunshine (2007), Steve Jobs (2015), T2 Trainspotting (2017), Yesterday (2019), and Ink (2026).

In 2012, Boyle served as the artistic director for the 2012 Summer Olympics opening ceremony held in London, which received wide praise as a "masterpiece" and "a love letter to Britain".

== Early life and education ==
Daniel Francis Boyle was born on 20 October 1956, in Radcliffe, Lancashire, England, about 6 miles (9.7 km) north of Manchester's city centre. His father Francis "Frank" Boyle was from Manchester and was of Irish Catholic descent from County Mayo, and his mother Annie Boyle was from County Galway. He has a twin sister, Marie, and a younger sister, Bernadette, both of whom are teachers.

Boyle was brought up in a working-class Catholic family. He was an altar boy for eight years and his mother had the priesthood in mind for him, but at the age of 14, he was persuaded by a priest against transferring to a seminary.

Whether he was saving me from the priesthood or the priesthood from me, I don't know. But quite soon after, I started doing drama. And there's a real connection, I think. All these directors – Martin Scorsese, John Woo, M. Night Shyamalan – they were all meant to be priests. There's something very theatrical about it. It's basically the same job – poncing around, telling people what to think.

Boyle attended Thornleigh Salesian College, a Catholic boys' direct grant grammar school in Bolton, and studied English and drama at the University College of North Wales (now Bangor University), where he directed several productions for the student drama society.

== Career ==
=== 1982–1989: Early theatrical works ===
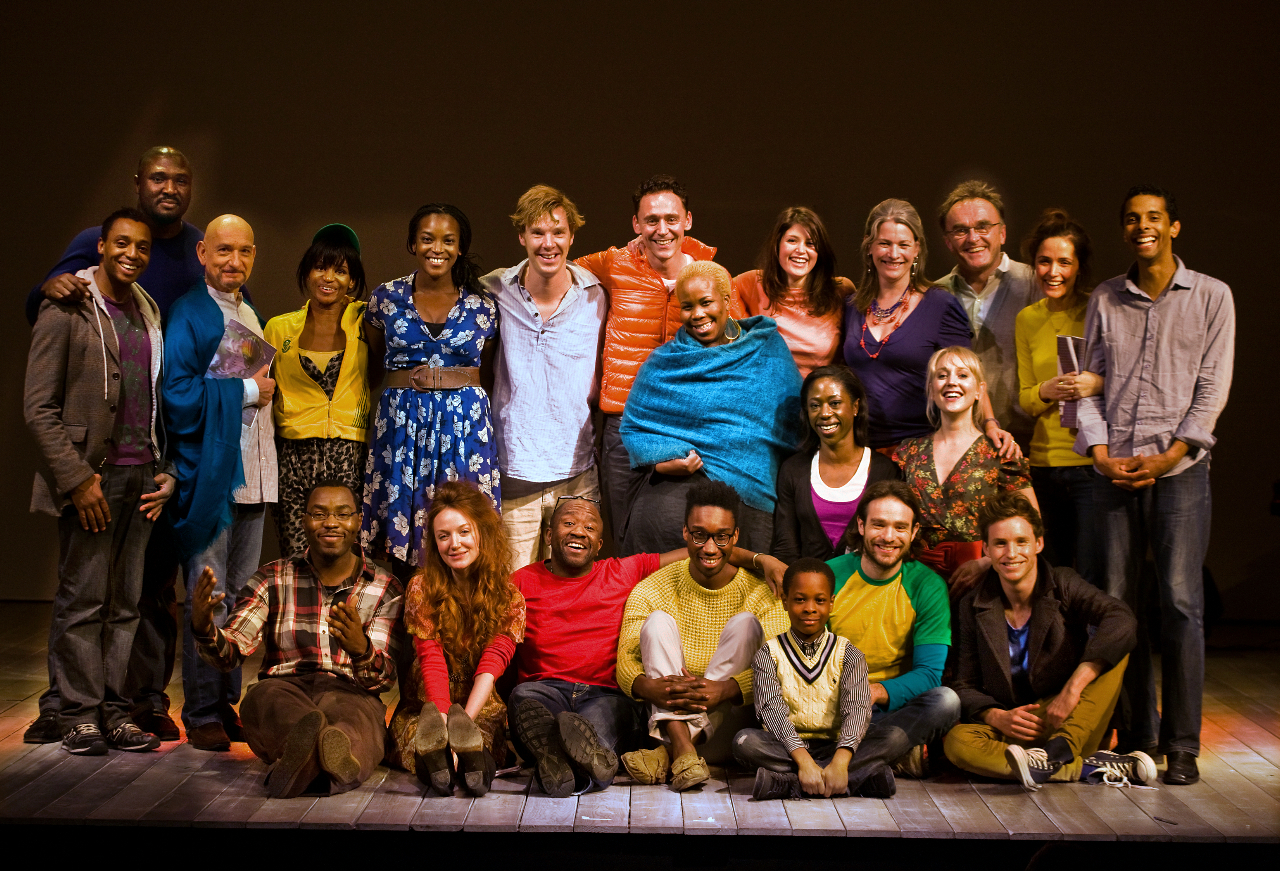
Boyle (back row, third from right) with the cast of The Children's Monologues at the Old Vic Theatre in London, November 2010

Upon graduating from university he began his career at the Joint Stock Theatre Company before moving on to the Royal Court Theatre in 1982 where he directed The Genius by Howard Brenton and Saved by Edward Bond. He directed five productions for the Royal Shakespeare Company.

In 1987 Boyle started working in television as a producer for BBC Northern Ireland where he produced, amongst other TV films, Alan Clarke's controversial Elephant before becoming a director on shows such as Arise And Go Now, Not Even God Is Wise Enough, For The Greater Good, Scout, and two episodes of Inspector Morse. Boyle was responsible for the BBC Two series Mr. Wroe's Virgins in 1993. In between The Beach and 28 Days Later Boyle directed two TV films for the BBC in 2001–Vacuuming Completely Nude in Paradise and Strumpet.

=== 1990–1999: Breakthrough in film ===
The first film Boyle directed was Shallow Grave. The film was the most commercially successful British film of 1995, won the BAFTA Award for Best British Film, and led to the production of Trainspotting. Working with writer John Hodge and producer Andrew Macdonald, Shallow Grave earned Boyle the Best Newcomer Award from the 1996 London Film Critics Circle. Critics credited these films with revitalising British cinema in the early '90s. The BFI ranked Trainspotting the 10th greatest British film of the 20th century.

Boyle declined an offer to direct Alien Resurrection, the fourth film of the Alien franchise to make A Life Less Ordinary.

=== 2000–2009: Established career and Slumdog Millionaire ===
Boyle's next project was a film adaptation of the cult novel The Beach by Alex Garland. It was filmed in Thailand. Casting Leonardo DiCaprio led to a feud with Ewan McGregor. He collaborated with Garland on the post-apocalyptic horror film 28 Days Later.

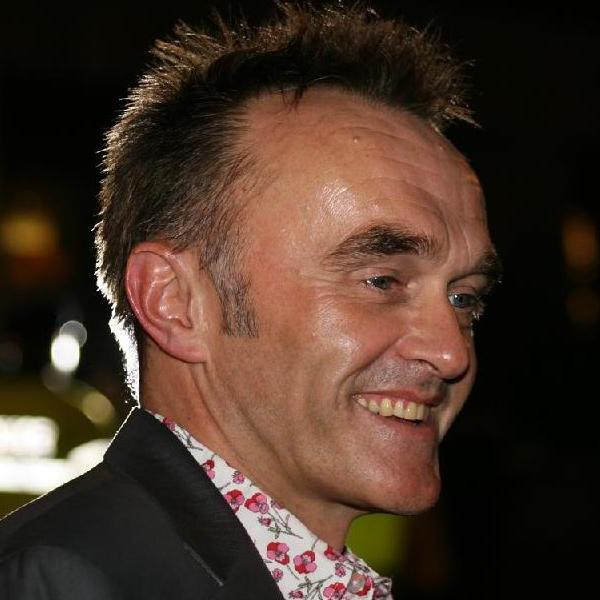
Boyle at the 2008 Toronto International Film Festival

He directed a short film Alien Love Triangle, which was intended to be one of three shorts within a feature film. The project was cancelled after the two other shorts were made into feature films: Mimic and Impostor. In 2004 Boyle directed Millions, scripted by Frank Cottrell Boyce. His next collaboration with Alex Garland was the 2007 science-fiction film Sunshine.

In 2008 he directed Slumdog Millionaire, the story of an impoverished child on the streets of Mumbai, India, who competes on the local version of Who Wants to Be a Millionaire?, for which Boyle won Academy and BAFTA Awards for Best Director. The most successful British film of the decade, the film won eight Academy Awards and seven BAFTA Awards. Boyle commented, "To be a film-maker...you have to lead. You have to be psychotic in your desire to do something. People always like the easy route. You have to push very hard to get something unusual, something different." Andrew Macdonald, producer of Trainspotting, said "Boyle takes a subject that you've often seen portrayed realistically, in a politically correct way, whether it's junkies or slum orphans, and he has managed to make it realistic but also incredibly uplifting and joyful." The success led a deal with Fox Searchlight.

Despite the commercial success of Slumdog Millionaire, Boyle faced criticism for his portrayal of India through a Western, idealised lens. Some critics saw the film as "poverty porn," though Boyle argued he showed India's "lust for life" and "resilience."

=== 2010–2019: Continued acclaim and 2012 Olympics ===
On 14 November 2010, he directed a one-night play at the Old Vic Theatre in London titled The Children's Monologues, in aid of his charity Dramatic Need, which operates in Rwanda and South Africa, helping young people to come to terms with trauma and conflict. He co-directed another performance of the play in 2015 at the Royal Court Theatre, and again in 2017 at Carnegie Hall in New York City. Also in 2010, Boyle directed the film 127 Hours. It was based on Aron Ralston's autobiography Between a Rock and a Hard Place, which detailed his struggle of being trapped under a boulder while canyoneering alone. The film was released on 5 November 2010 to critical acclaim and got six nominations at the 83rd Academy Awards, including Best Picture and Best Adapted Screenplay for Boyle and Best Actor for Franco.

In 2011, he directed Frankenstein for the National Theatre. This production was broadcast to cinemas as a part of National Theatre Live on 17 March 2011. He has appeared on Top Gear and set the fastest wet lap at that time. In 2014 both Boyle and Christian Colson signed to a first look deal with FX Productions.

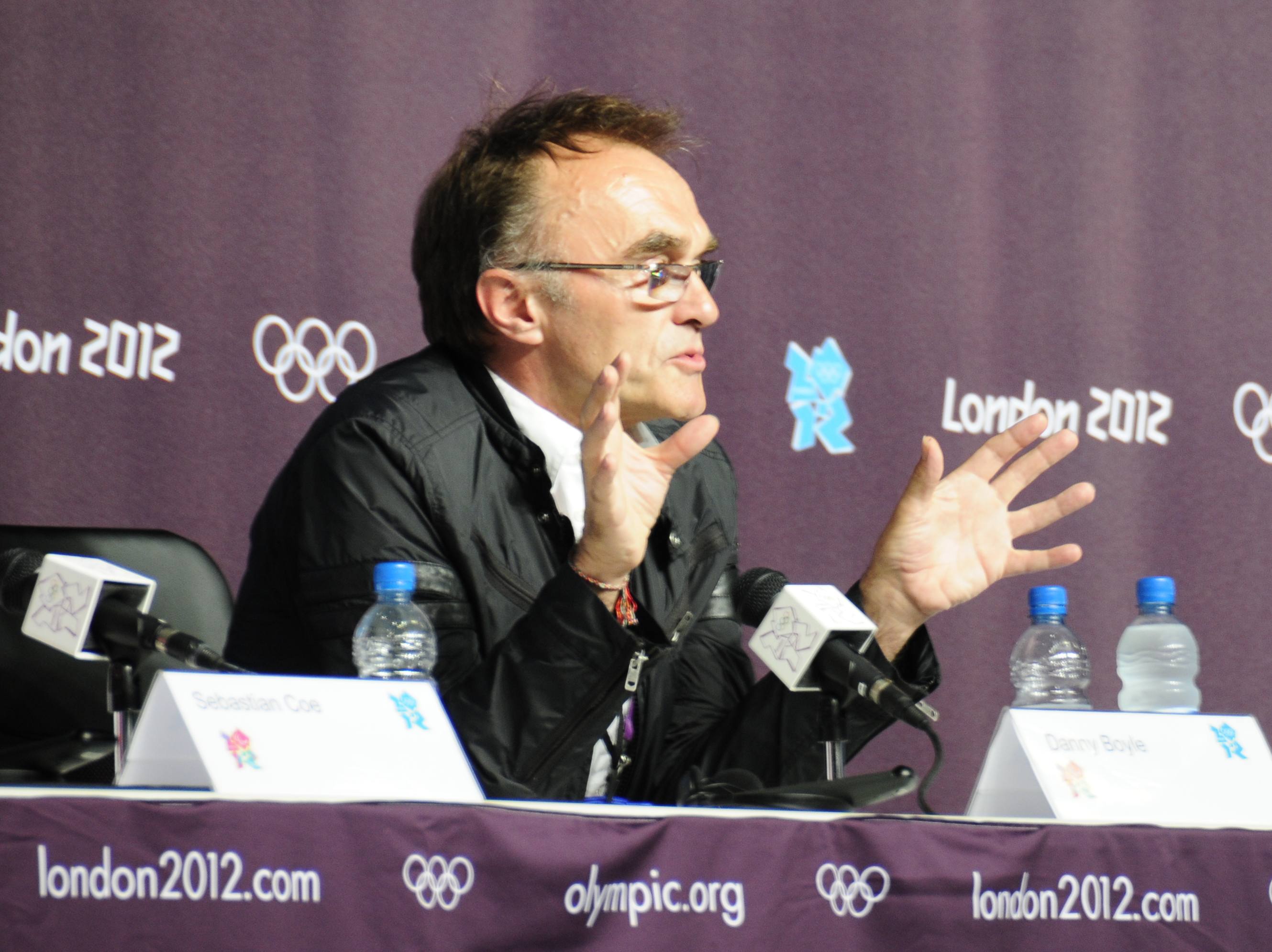
Prior to the 2012 Summer Olympics opening ceremony

Boyle was artistic director for the 2012 Summer Olympics opening ceremony in London. Entitled Isles of Wonder, it charted aspects of British culture including the Industrial Revolution and contributions to literature, music, film, and technology.

Reception to the ceremony was generally positive both nationally in the United Kingdom and internationally.

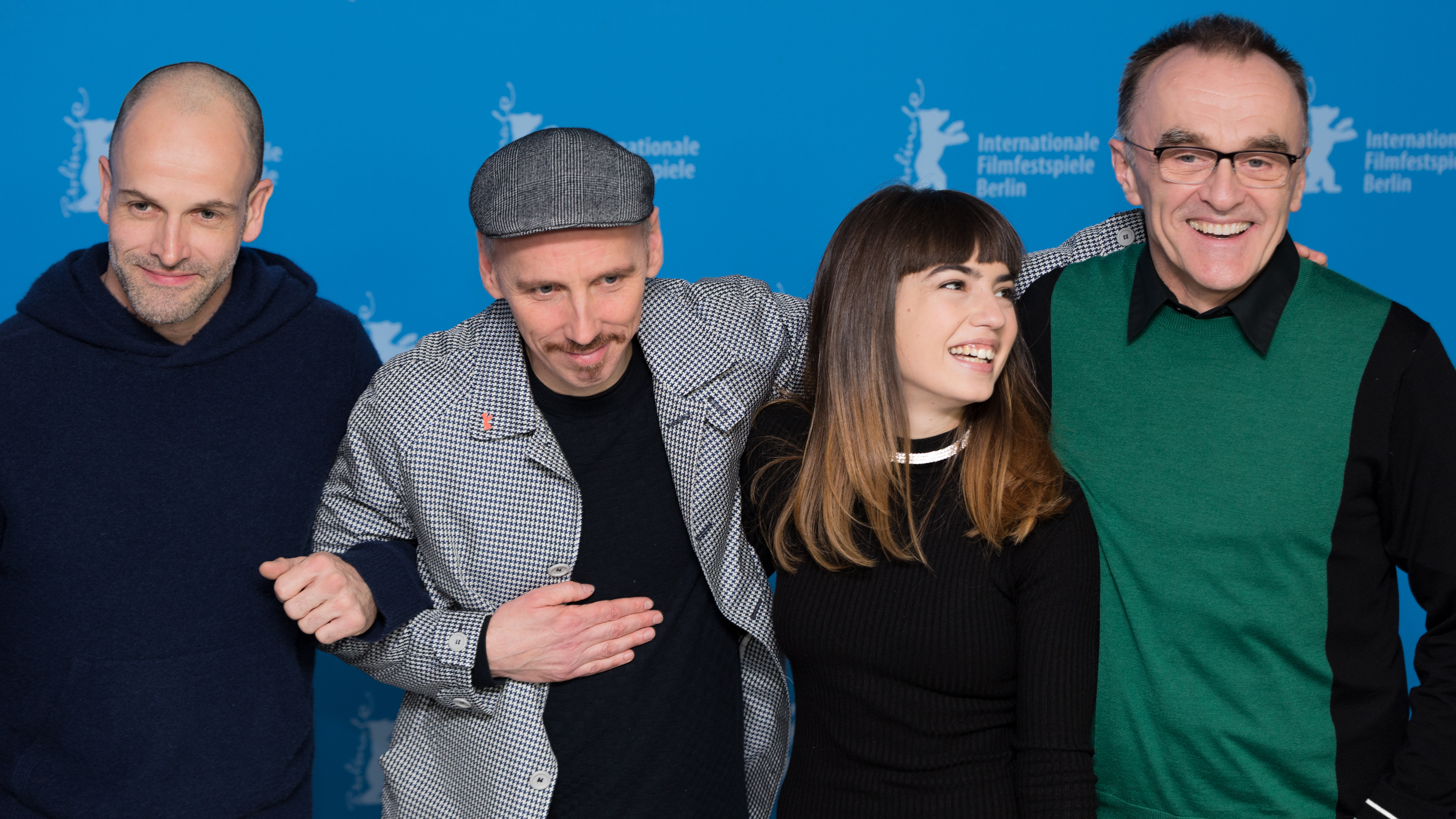
The film team of T2 Trainspotting at the Berlinale 2017

Boyle's next film was Trance. It was reported at the time that another instalment of the 28 Days Later franchise was in the development stages. Boyle has stated previously that in theory the third instalment of the series would be titled 28 Months Later, but alluded to a film taking place somewhere else in the world he created in 28 Days Later and 28 Weeks Later. He was also stated to be producing the upcoming film Paani.

Boyle told an interviewer about the eclectic range of his films, "There's a theme running through all of them—and I just realised this. They're all about someone facing impossible odds and overcoming them." With a strong interest in music, Boyle has mentioned in interviews that he has considered a musical film with original compositions. Boyle has also expressed interest in an animated film.

Boyle's biographical film Steve Jobs about Apple Inc. founder Steve Jobs closed the 59th BFI London Film Festival. It was the third time Boyle has had that honour, after Slumdog Millionaire in 2008 and 127 Hours two years later. The BFI's London Film Festival Director, Clare Stewart, said Boyle had created an "exhilarating and audacious film about a complex, charismatic pioneer". He directed the sequel to Trainspotting, T2 Trainspotting.

In a BBC interview, Boyle stated that he did not write his own films but they did reflect his personality. "I am not a big auteur fan and like to work with writers, but ultimately a film is a director's vision, because he gets all its elements together towards that vision."

In March 2018, Boyle confirmed he would be directing the then-untitled twenty-fifth James Bond film (later known as No Time to Die) but dropped out that August due to a dispute over the film's script. He and writer Richard Curtis collaborated on Yesterday, released on 28 June 2019.

=== 2020s: 28 Years Later and upcoming projects ===
On 11 January 2021, it was announced that Boyle would be adapting the Steve Jones' autobiography Lonely Boy into a six-part TV series entitled Pistol that charts the rise and fall of the Sex Pistols. The series aired on FX and Disney+ on 30 May 2022. The show was filmed in London. In September 2022, it was announced that Boyle would direct a dance adaptation of The Matrix, titled "Free Your Mind", which debuted in October 2023 in Manchester.

In 2024, after a two-year hiatus from directing, Boyle reunited with Garland to make 28 Years Later, which is set in a post-apocalyptic Britain 28 years after the first film in the 28 Days Later series. The film was released in June 2025 to positive reviews. It is the first in a planned trilogy, with the second, 28 Years Later: The Bone Temple, of which Boyle served as producer, releasing in January 2026. In August 2025, Deadline Hollywood reported that Boyle would direct a film adaptation of Ink, a play by James Graham about the rise of media mogul Rupert Murdoch. Guy Pearce and Jack O'Connell are in talks to portray Murdoch and newspaper editor Larry Lamb respectively, with Graham adapting the screenplay and filming set to begin in October 2025.

== Influence ==
Boyle's love for film began with his first viewing of Apocalypse Now:

It had eviscerated my brain, completely. I was an impressionable twenty-one-year-old guy from the sticks. My brain had not been fed and watered with great culture, you know, as art is meant to do. It had been sandblasted by the power of cinema. And that's why cinema, despite everything we try to do, it remains a young man's medium, really, in terms of audience.

== Personal life ==
While at university, Boyle dated actress Frances Barber. As of 2010 he was living in Mile End, London. He has three children.

In 2013, he spoke about his republican views of the British government and said he believes the British monarchy would be abolished in his lifetime. He described himself as a "spiritual atheist" in 2007.

== Other ventures ==
Boyle was a founding trustee in 2007, of Dramatic Need, a charity which operated in Rwanda and South Africa, helping young people to come to terms with trauma and conflict. The charity was wound up in November 2021.

As of 2008, Boyle was the patron of North West England-based young people's substance misuse charity, Early Break, which was founded and based in his home town of Radcliffe. In 2014, Boyle was appointed a patron of HOME in Manchester.

In February 2017, Boyle announced a bid to launch a £30 million film and media school in Manchester. Manchester School of Digital Arts was subsequently launched in June 2022 as part of Manchester Metropolitan University.

In May 2025, Boyle signed a petition started after the killing of Palestinian photojournalist Fatima Hassouna, accusing Israel of committing genocide in the Gaza Strip.

== Filmography ==
=== Film ===
Year	Title	Director	Producer	Writer
1994	Shallow Grave	Yes	No	No
1996	Trainspotting	Yes	No	No
1997	A Life Less Ordinary	Yes	No	No
2000	The Beach	Yes	No	No
2002	28 Days Later	Yes	No	No
2004	Millions	Yes	No	No
2007	Sunshine	Yes	No	No
2008	Slumdog Millionaire	Yes	No	No
2010	127 Hours	Yes	Yes	Yes
2013	Trance	Yes	Yes	No
2015	Steve Jobs	Yes	Yes	No
2017	T2 Trainspotting	Yes	Yes	No
2017	Battle of the Sexes	No	Yes	No
2019	Yesterday	Yes	Yes	No
2025	28 Years Later	Yes	Yes	No
2026	28 Years Later: The Bone Temple	No	Yes	No
2026	Ink	Yes	Yes	No

Key
†	Denotes films that have not yet been released

Short film

- Alien Love Triangle (2008)

Executive producer

- Twin Town (1997)
- 28 Weeks Later (2007)
- Creation Stories (2021)

=== Television ===
Year	Title	Director	Producer	Writer	Notes
1987	Scout	Yes	No	No	Television film
1987	The Venus de Milo Instead	Yes	No	No	Television film
1987	The Rockingham Shoot	No	Yes	No	Television film
1989	Elephant	No	Yes	No	TV short
1989	Monkeys	Yes	Yes	No	Television film
1989	The Nightwatch	Yes	Yes	No	Television film
1989–1993	ScreenPlay	Yes	No	No	3 episodes
1990–1992	Inspector Morse	Yes	No	No	2 episodes
1991	For the Greater Good	Yes	No	No	
1993	Mr Wroe's Virgins	Yes	No	No	3 episodes
2001	Vacuuming Completely Nude in Paradise	Yes	No	No	Television film
2001	Strumpet	Yes	No	No	Television film
2012	Isles of Wonder	Yes	No	Yes	Olympics opening ceremony
2014	Babylon	Yes	Yes	No	Episode: "Pilot"
2017	The Alternativity	Yes	Yes	No	Play of Banksy
2018	Trust	Yes	Yes	No	3 episodes
2022	Pistol	Yes	Yes	No	Miniseries

=== Theatre ===
Assistant stage manager

Year	Title	Theater
1978	The Ragged-Trousered Philanthropists	Joint Stock Theatre Company

Assistant director

Year	Title	Theater
1981	The Seagull	Royal Court Theatre

Director

Year	Title	Theater
1982	The Genius	Royal Court Theatre
1984-85	Saved	Royal Court Theatre
1985-86	The Grace of Mary Traverse	Royal Court Theatre
1988-89	The Bite of the Night	Royal Shakespeare Company, Barbican Theater
1989	The Silent Woman	Royal Shakespeare Company, Swan Theatre, Stratford-upon-Avon
1989	H.I.D	Royal Shakespeare Company, Almeida Theatre
1989-90	The Second Line	Cambridge Arts Theatre
1990-91	The Last Days of Don Juan	Royal Shakespeare Company, Swan Theatre, Stratford-upon-Avon, Barbican Theater, Newcastle Playhouse, Pit
1991-92	The Pretenders	Barbican Theater
2010	The Children's Monologues	The Old Vic
2011	Frankenstein	Royal National Theatre
2023	Free Your Mind	The Factory

== Awards and nominations ==
In 2010, The Tablet named Boyle one of Britain's most influential Roman Catholics. The BBC referred to Boyle as a "titan of the British film industry – renowned for his spunky grit – typified by his 1996 film Trainspotting."

In 2012, Boyle was among the British cultural icons selected by artist Peter Blake to appear in a new version of The Beatles' Sgt. Pepper's Lonely Hearts Club Band album cover, to celebrate the British cultural figures of his lifetime. In December 2012, it was reported that Boyle turned down a knighthood in the New Year Honours list. He later said that he believed "in being an equal citizen rather than a preferred subject" and that "that sort of thing just makes me vomit."

Awards and nominations received for films directed by Boyle
Year	Title	Academy Awards		BAFTA Awards		Golden Globe Awards	
Year	Title	Nominations	Wins	Nominations	Wins	Nominations	Wins
1994	Shallow Grave			1			
1996	Trainspotting	1		2	1		
2008	Slumdog Millionaire	10	8	11	6	4	4
2010	127 Hours	6		8		3	
2015	Steve Jobs	2		3	1	4	2
2025	28 Years Later			1			
Total		19	8	26	8	11	6

Directed Academy Award performances
Under Boyle's direction, these actors have received Academy Award nominations for their performances in their respective roles.

Year	Performer	Film	Result
Academy Award for Best Actor
2010	James Franco	127 Hours	Nominated
2015	Michael Fassbender	Steve Jobs	Nominated
Academy Award for Best Supporting Actress
2015	Kate Winslet	Steve Jobs	Nominated

== Critical reception ==
Year	Title	Rotten Tomatoes	Metacritic
1994	Shallow Grave	72% (54 reviews)	69 (21 reviews)
1996	Trainspotting	93% (176 reviews)	83 (28 reviews)
1997	A Life Less Ordinary	41% (37 reviews)	37 (22 reviews)
2000	The Beach	21% (122 reviews)	43 (34 reviews)
2002	28 Days Later	87% (240 reviews)	73 (39 reviews)
2004	Millions	87% (159 reviews)	74 (33 reviews)
2007	Sunshine	77% (172 reviews)	64 (34 reviews)
2008	Slumdog Millionaire	92% (287 reviews)	84 (36 reviews)
2010	127 Hours	93% (237 reviews)	82 (38 reviews)
2013	Trance	69% (182 reviews)	61 (37 reviews)
2015	Steve Jobs	85% (312 reviews)	82 (45 reviews)
2017	T2 Trainspotting	81% (250 reviews)	67 (42 reviews)
2019	Yesterday	64% (365 reviews)	55 (45 reviews)
2025	28 Years Later	88% (399 reviews)	77 (56 reviews)
2026	Ink	84% (25 reviews)	80 (14 reviews)
