= Up and Down the Scratchy Mountains =

2008 novel by Laurel Snyder

- Author: Laurel Snyder
- Genre: Adventure
- Publisher: Random House
- Publication date: August 2008
- Publication place: United States
- Pages: 256
- ISBN: 978-0-375-84719-6
- OCLC: 131062182
- LC Class: PZ8.S4177 Up 2008

Up and Down the Scratchy Mountains is a 2008 children's novel by Laurel Snyder.

== Plot ==
Lucy lives in the land of Bewilderness, in a village called Thistle. She helps her family with the dairy farm and likes exploring the countryside with her best friend Wynston. Lucy makes up songs that fit with the situation which gives her courage and raises her spirits. She learned how to make up songs from her mother. Her mother vanished when she was two years old. Lucy and her sister never say anything about their mother, because their father gets sad. When Wynston turns twelve, his father thinks that he should practice being a prince which includes finding a princess. Wynston doesn't understand why he has to follow his father's rules; same with Lucy. When Wynston doesn't come to one of their berry-picking parties, she is sad and decides to go on an adventure. She is going to climb the Scratchy Mountains so that she can find her mother.

== Characters ==
Lucy
A courageous, headstrong girl who wants desperately to find her mother.

Sally
Lucy's neat and tidy sister.

Wynston
A prince, who happens to be Lucy's best friend.

King Desmond-Wynston's father
A man who is very kind, but thinks that Wynston should spend more time in "the art of Queening" than with Lucy.

Lucy's father
A humble man, who raises milk cows for a living.

Steven
A boy from Torrent, the town at the top of the mountain, who sometimes breaks the rules.

Willie
A friend that Wynston met on his way to find Lucy.

== Reception ==
A Kirkus Reviews review says, "This delightfully droll fairy tale features a feisty milkmaid named Lucy and her best friend, Prince Wynston. Wynston has been forced to swap berry-picking adventures with Lucy for lessons in the rules and rituals of courtship, as his father insists that he must find a proper princess to be his future Queen". The author of Finding the Light and The Black Pond, reviewed the book saying "Up and Down the Scratchy Mountains is a fun and charming story that will touch your heart". It got reviewed by School Library Journal.
