= Frank H. Smith =

American media executive and producer

Frank Smith
- Born: Brooklyn, New York, U.S.
- Education: Pepperdine University, New England Law Boston
- Occupations: Film executive and producer

Frank H. Smith is an American media executive and producer, and current president and chief executive officer at Anschutz Film Group (AFG) and Walden Media. He is a former vice president of business and legal affairs at New Line Cinema and Fine Line Features.

== Background ==
Smith was born in Brooklyn, New York, and attended New England Law Boston (formerly New England Law School) where he received his Juris Doctor and earned his Bachelor of Science in Business Management from Pepperdine University.

Smith started his career with New Line Cinema on the Business and Legal Affairs team. In 2003, he moved to AFG as head of business affairs. He later became general counsel and has served as the chief operating officer since 2013. He was appointed as the chief executive officer within a few years; in this role, he oversees all aspects of Walden's operations. He has expanded Walden from a producer for the theatrical market into TV and streaming, producing projects such as Netflix's The Baby-Sitters Club and Apple TV+'s Finch where he served as an executive producer.

In 2009, Smith was named the Deal Maker of the Year and was awarded the Association of Media and Entertainment Counsel's Dan Brandhorst Award.

During his tenure at AFG and Walden, he oversaw business and legal affairs on several award-winning films such as The Chronicles of Narnia: the Lion, the Witch and the Wardrobe, Journey to the Center of the Earth, Prince Caspian, Voyage of the Dawn Treader, Parental Guidance, Wonder, A Dog's Purpose, and The Star.

In 2022, Smith won an Emmy Award as an executive producer of Netflix's The Baby-Sitters Club at the inaugural Children and Family Emmy Awards on December 11, 2022 in Los Angeles.
