= Millions (novel) =

2004 novel by Frank Cottrell Boyce

- First edition (UK)
- Author: Frank Cottrell Boyce
- Language: English
- Genre: Children's comedy
- Publisher: Macmillan (UK); HarperCollins (US)
- Publication date: 6 February 2004
- Publication place: United Kingdom; United States
- Media type: Print (hardback and paperback)
- Pages: 250 pp (first edition, UK)
- ISBN: 978-1-4050-4736-4; ISBN 978-0-06-073330-8 (US)
- OCLC: 440864983
- LC Class: PZ7.C82963 Mi 2004

Millions is a novel published early in 2004, the first book by British screenwriter Frank Cottrell Boyce. It is an adaptation of his screenplay for the film Millions, although it was released six months before the film (September). Set in England just before British adoption of the euro (a fictional event) the story features two boys who must decide what to do with a windfall in expiring currency.

Cottrell Boyce won the annual Carnegie Medal from the British librarians, recognising the year's best children's book published in the UK. Millions was an integral part of the annual Liverpool Reads campaign in his home city.

== Awards and nominations ==
Beside winning the Carnegie Medal from the British librarians, Millions made the shortlists for the Guardian Children's Fiction Prize, the Whitbread Award for Childrens Book, and the Branford Boase Award.

Awards
Preceded by A Gathering Light	Carnegie Medal recipient 2004	Succeeded by Tamar
