= Kevin Emerson =

American author of young adult books

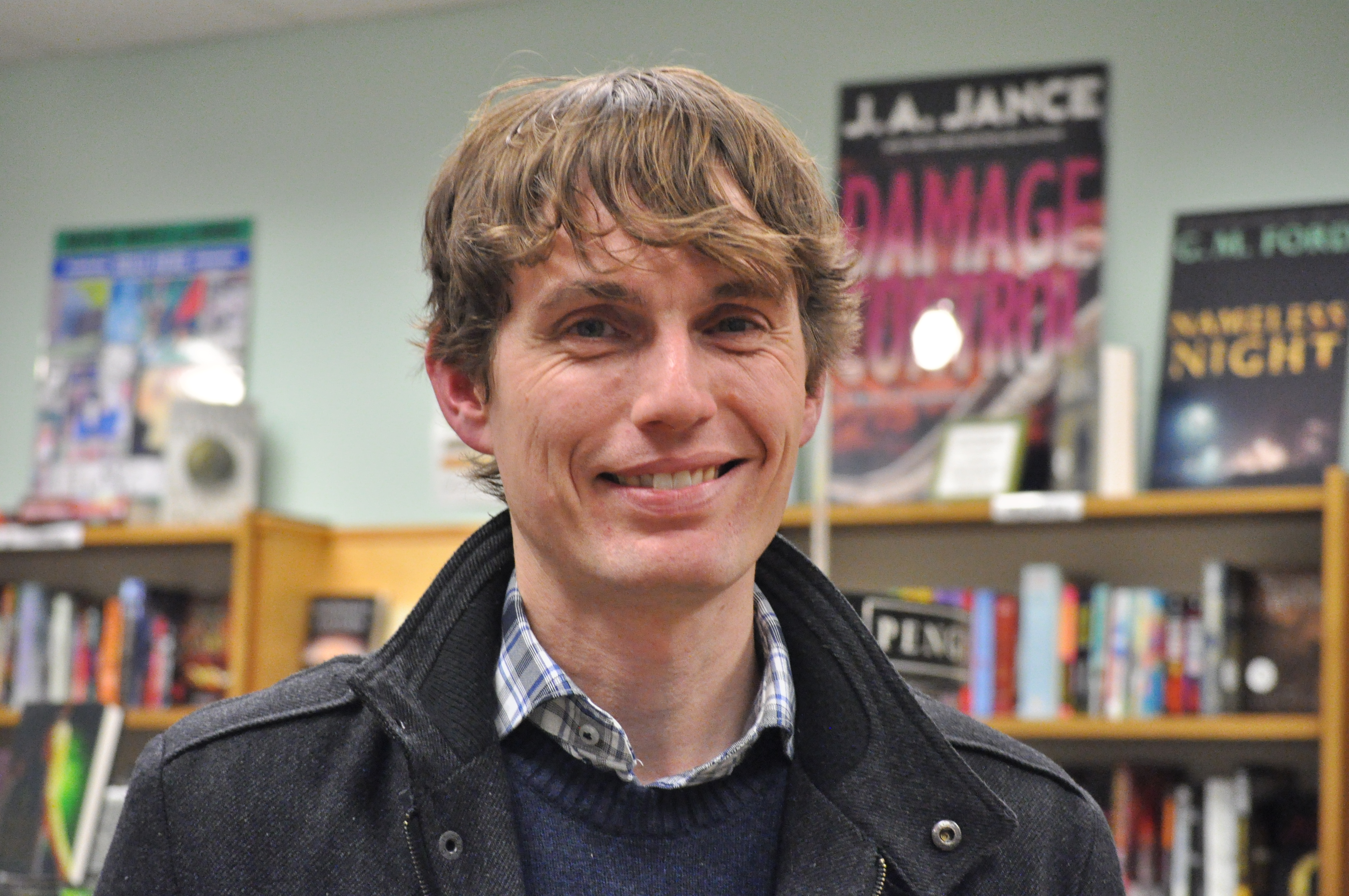
- Emerson in 2013
- Education: Colby College
- Occupations: Author, Singer
- Website: kevinemerson.net

Kevin Emerson is an American author of young adult books and is the lead singer for the band Central Services' The Board of Education.

== Biography ==
Kevin Emerson grew up in Cheshire, Connecticut and went to Colby College. His past careers were as a banker, camp counselor, and an elementary school teacher.

== Band ==
Central Services' The Board of Education is a band that sings educational music for kids and the band's songs charted nationally on college radio. They released an album called Central Services Presents... The Board of Education.

== Reception ==
R.J. Carter of the Trades said that the first Oliver Nocturne book is creepy, good for kids eight and up, and he gave the book a B+. Wendy Hines of Armchair Interviews said that she highly recommends the first Oliver Nocturne book.

In 2017, Last Day on Mars was a finalist for the Cybils Award for Elementary and Middle Grade Speculative Fiction.

== Publications ==
=== Standalone books ===
- Carlos Is Gonna Get It (2008, Arthur A. Levine Books, ISBN 9780439935258)
- Breakout (2015, Crown Books for Young Readers, ISBN 9780385391122)
- Any Second (2018, Crown Books for Young Readers, ISBN 9780553534825)
- Drifters (2022, Walden Pond Press, ISBN 9780062976963)(latest book)

=== Oliver Nocturne Series ===
1. The Vampire's Photograph (2008, Scholastic Paperbacks, ISBN 9780545058018)
2. The Sunlight Slayings (2008, Scholastic Paperbacks, ISBN 9780545058025)
3. Blood Ties (2008, Scholastic Paperbacks, ISBN 9780545058032)
4. The Demon Hunter (2009, Scholastic Paperbacks, ISBN 9780545058049)
5. The Eternal Tomb ( 2009, Scholastic Paperbacks, ISBN 9780545058056)
6. The Triad of Finity ( 2009, Scholastic Paperbacks, ISBN 9780615472096)

=== The Atlanteans Trilogy ===
1. The Lost Code (2012, Katherine Tegen Books, ISBN 9780062062796)
2. The Dark Shore (2013, Katherine Tegen Books, ISBN 9780062062826)
3. The Far Dawn (2014, Katherine Tegen Books, ISBN 9780062062864)

=== Exile Trilogy ===
1. Exile (2014, Katherine Tegen Books, ISBN 9780062133953)
2. Encore to an Empty Room (2015, Katherine Tegen Books, ISBN 9780062133984)
3. Finding Abbey Road (2016, Katherine Tegen Books, ISBN 9780062134011)

=== Chronicle of the Dark Star Trilogy ===
- The Fellowship for Alien Detection (2013, Walden Pond Press, ISBN 9780062071859)
1. Last Day on Mars (2017, Walden Pond Press, ISBN 9780062306715)
2. The Oceans Between Stars (2018, Walden Pond Press, ISBN 9780062306760)
3. The Shores Beyond Time (2019, Walden Pond Press, ISBN 9780062306791)

=== Lost in Space Duo ===
1. Return to Yesterday (2019, Little, Brown Books for Young Readers, ISBN 9780316425933)
2. Infinity's Edge (2020, Little, Brown Books for Young Readers, ISBN 9780316425971)
