= Millions (2004 film) =

2004 British film by Danny Boyle

- Theatrical release poster
- Directed by: Danny Boyle
- Screenplay by: Frank Cottrell-Boyce
- Based on: Millions by Frank Cottrell-Boyce
- Produced by: Graham Broadbent; Andrew Hauptman; Damian Jones
- Starring: Alex Etel; Lewis Owen McGibbon; James Nesbitt; Daisy Donovan; Christopher Fulford
- Cinematography: Anthony Dod Mantle
- Edited by: Chris Gill
- Music by: John Murphy
- Production companies: Fox Searchlight Pictures; Pathé Pictures; UK Film Council; BBC Films; Mission Pictures; Inside Track 2 Ingenious Film Partners; Andell Entertainment (uncredited)
- Distributed by: Pathé Distribution (United Kingdom and France); Fox Searchlight Pictures (United States)
- Release dates: 14 September 2004 (TIFF); 11 March 2005 (United States); 27 May 2005 (United Kingdom)
- Running time: 95 minutes
- Countries: United Kingdom; France; United States
- Language: English
- Box office: £7.5 million

Millions is a 2004 comedy-drama film directed by Danny Boyle, and starring Alex Etel, Lewis Owen McGibbon, and James Nesbitt. The film's screenwriter Frank Cottrell-Boyce adapted his screenplay into a novel while the film was still in production. The novel was subsequently awarded the Carnegie Medal.

== Plot ==
Damian, a 9-year-old Catholic boy, and his family move to the suburbs of Widnes after the death of his mother. One day, while playing in a cardboard box by the train tracks, Damian is disturbed by a bag of money flung from a passing train. He immediately shows the money to his brother, 12-year-old Anthony, and the brothers think of what they should do with it. Anthony wants to keep the money all to themselves, but Damian, being kind-hearted, religious, and inspired by a lecture at school, looks for ways to give his share of the money to help those in need.

Damian goes on to commit small acts of kindness, such as buying birds from pet shops and setting them free, and taking beggars to Pizza Hut. On the other hand, Anthony bribes other kids at school into being his transport and bodyguards, and looks into investing the money in real estate. A mysterious man comes snooping around the train tracks, and asks Damian if he has any money. Damian thinks that the man is a beggar and tells him he has "loads of money". However, a suspicious Anthony gives the man a jar full of coins to cover Damian's tracks.

The story takes place in the weeks leading up to the United Kingdom's fictionalised changover to the European single currency (€), an event publicised as "€ Day". An assembly is held at Damian's school to inform the children about the change, as well as to educate them about helping the poor. Realising that the money will be worthless after a few days, Damian decides that it would be best to give it away before the adoption of the Euro. He drops £1,000 into the donation can at assembly. The woman collecting the money, Dorothy, reports Damian to the head teacher. Anthony lies that he and Damian stole the money from missionaries, and both Damian and Anthony are grounded that night. When their father collects them from school, he chats with Dorothy and there is an obvious attraction between them.

After the donation, Anthony's friend informs them that a train carrying banknotes that were meant to be destroyed after the conversion had been robbed. One bag was stolen in a diversion; the robbers then distracted the police before escaping into a crowd of football fans. However, one robber stayed on the train disguised as one of the emergency staff, dispersing the money by throwing it off the train at various locations where it could later be collected by other accomplices. The boys logically conclude that their money was stolen, and Damian, who thought the money was from God, feels terrible upon hearing this.

The mysterious man on the train tracks turns out to be one of the robbers looking for the bag. He eventually finds out where Damian lives and ransacks the house. Damian informs his father about the money just before they come home to find their house destroyed. The robber, who is still in the house, hides in Damian's room after ransacking it. Damian's father, who had resolved to give the money back, decides that if the robbers are going to steal his family's Christmas, then he will steal the robbers' money. The family, as well as Dorothy, go on a massive shopping spree on Christmas Eve.

That night, while they are asleep, their house is bombarded by beggars and charities begging for donations and, seeing the confusion that ensues, Damian runs off to the train tracks to burn the money, realising that it is doing them more harm than good. Meanwhile, a robber sneaks through the back door and is arrested by the police. While Damian is burning the money, he is visited by his dead mother, who tells him not to worry about her.

In the final scene, the audience sees Damian's dream of the family flying a rocket ship to Africa and helping develop water wells, while Damian narrates over the scene that each family member but him had hidden a little bit of the money beforehand. Damian convinced them to spend this money on the wells he is dreaming about. (Earlier in the film, wells were shown to be the cheapest way of improving the quality of life for many African communities.)

== Cast ==
- Alex Etel as Damian Cunningham
- Lewis Owen McGibbon as Anthony "Tony" Cunningham
- James Nesbitt as Ronald "Ronnie" Cunningham
- Daisy Donovan as Dorothy
- Christopher Fulford as The "Poor Man"
- Pearce Quigley as Community Policeman
- Jane Hogarth as Maureen
- Alun Armstrong as Saint Peter
- Enzo Cilenti as Saint Francis of Assisi
- Nasser Memarzia as Saint Joseph
- Kathryn Pogson as Saint Clare of Assisi
- Harry Kirkham as Saint Nicholas
- Cornelius Macarthy as Gonzaga
- Kolade Agboke as Ambrosio
- Leslie Phillips as himself
- Ajit Chauhan as school boy

== Production ==
In a 2014 interview, Boyle stated that, had he and Cottrell-Boyce been more confident, they would have made the film as a musical, with the characters singing and dancing. Boyle was interested in having Noel Gallagher write original songs for the film.

== Release ==
=== Home media ===
Millions was released on DVD on 1 November 2005. The film is also available on Disney+ after its launch on 12 November 2019.

=== Box office ===
The film was a modest box office success, earning £7,830,074.88 worldwide despite a limited release to just 340 theatres, contending with Steven Spielberg's War of the Worlds. Around £3,987,642.22 of the final box office was received in the UK alone.

=== Critical reception ===
Millions received positive reviews, earning an 88% approval rating on the review aggregate website Rotten Tomatoes based on 161 reviews, with an average rating of 7.40/10. The critical consensus calls the film "a charming children fable even adults can enjoy." On Metacritic, the film holds a score of 74 out of 100 based on reviews from 33 critics.

Roger Ebert awarded it a rating of four out of four and declared it "one of the best films of the year". He went on to write, ". . . although Millions uses special effects and materializing saints, it's a film about real ideas, real issues and real kids. It's not sanitized brainless eye candy. Like all great family movies, it plays equally well for adults—maybe better, since we know how unusual it is." It was on his Top 10 movies of 2005, placing at number 10.

Richard Roeper, Roger Ebert's co-host on the television show Ebert & Roeper, called it "One of the most stylish and eccentric films about childhood dreams and heartbreaks that I've ever seen."

Leonard Maltin praised the film upon its DVD release, saying "Millions is a winning and unpredictable fable from England that will charm viewers both young and old."

==== Christian film critics ====
Catholic News Service's Harry Forbes wrote, "Boyle's offbeat tale – with a clever script by Frank-Cottrell Boyce – features good performances all around, especially by the remarkable Etel, who displays just the right innocence and religious fervor in delightful vignettes with the saints. The script dramatizes the themes of money and its complexities and the need for societal philanthropy without being heavy-handed, making this ideal entertainment for older adolescents and up."

Sister Rose Pacatte, F.S.P. (AmericanCatholic.org) commented, "Millions engages, inspires and is just quirky enough to be charming." She added, "Damien's familiarity with the saints and his recitation of their biographies is accurate and very funny."

Although praising the film for its positive depiction of the role the Christian faith can play in a young boy's life, some publications have pointed out details that viewers might find objectionable or deem inappropriate for younger audiences. As Harry Forbes wrote, "The film contains a couple of mildly crude expressions, some intense episodes of menace, a momentary sexual situation, religious stereotyping, and a brief scene where the brothers look, with boyish curiosity, at a web site for women's bras on a computer." As such, he explained, "the USCCB Office for Film & Broadcasting classification is A-II – adults and adolescents."

Johnathan Wooten of Christian Spotlight on Entertainment downplayed the significance, saying, "Those concerned about objectionable content will not find much to offend here though. There is very little violence (a short robbery scene, a very brief moment of a child in peril). Sexual content includes a glimpse of an unmarried couple in bed together as well as pre-pubescent boy viewing an Internet lingerie ad. When played out the latter scene actually has a strange wholesomeness to it considering his other viewing options. The only profanity is some mild British slang."

=== Accolades ===
The film premiered at the 2004 Toronto International Film Festival on 14 September 2004.

2005 British Independent Film Awards

- Won, Best Screenplay: Frank Cottrell-Boyce
- Nominated, Most Promising Newcomer: Alex Etel

2006 Broadcast Film Critics Association Awards

- Nominated, Best Young Actor: Alex Etel

2005 Emden International Film Festival

- Nominated, Emden Film Award: Danny Boyle

2005 Golden Trailer Awards

- Nominated, Best Animation/Family
- Nominated, Best Foreign Independent Film

2005 Humanitas Prize

- Nominated, Best Film

2005 Phoenix Film Critics Association

- Won, Best Live Action Family Film

2006 Saturn Awards

- Nominated, Best Performance by a Younger Actor: Alex Etel

== Soundtrack ==
- The song playing in the flashback to the train robbery is "Hysteria" by Muse and, shortly after, another Muse song is played, "Blackout". It also includes "Hitsville UK" by The Clash, from their album Sandinista!.
- The song playing in the scene after they descend from the sky and provide water in Africa is "Nirvana", by Elbosco on the Angelis album.
- The song "La Petite Fille de la mer" by Vangelis also appears in the film.
- Members of the Northwest Boychoir directed by Joseph Crnko sang on the soundtrack.
