= The Childrens Choir of Elbosco =

The Childrens Choir of Elbosco, also known as simply Elbosco, was a Spanish musical group that achieved worldwide success with the song "Nirvana" in 1995.

The group consisted of the children choral group of the Escolanía del Real Monasterio of San Lorenzo de El Escorial, with boys between 9 and 14 years old alongside adult instrumentalists and soloists. The group mixed classical music, children chorus and synth generated sounds, resulting in a sound similar to that of Enigma. Their name is a reference to the Dutch painter Hieronymus Bosch, known in Spain as "El Bosco".

In 1995, the group released their debut album Angelis under the Hispavox label. The opener song, "Nirvana", employed a mixture of Gregorian chants with hip-hop and techno, and attained international fame. Following this success, Angelis was released in other countries such as Brazil, Germany and Portugal. "Nirvana" was used in the soundtrack of the 2004 film Millions.

In 1997, the group released their second album, Virginal. After failing to achieve the same success as in their first releases, the group dissolved in 1998.

In 2005, to celebrate Angelis's 10th anniversary, EMI published a new edition of the album with two new songs, alongside a videoclip.

== Discography ==
Angelis (Hispavox, 1995)

- Nirvana (4:54)
- A Kind of Birds (4:21)
- Nebo (4:46)
- Spend a Happy Day (4:42)
- Zom (3:48)
- Soul Lives Forever (5:03)
- Angelis (4:10)
- Children of Light (5:28)
- Life Is One (4:53)
- Egos Quos Amo (4:50)
- Opera Verbum (4:22)
- Blind Man (4:57)
- In Excelsis (5:25)

Virginal (Hispavox, 1997)

- Ave Virgo (3:54)
- Paradise Girl (4:17)
- Echo's Queen (3:33)
- Lost Paradise (3:59)
- Virginal (4:16)
- The City (4:54)
- Orbit (3:22)
- Fancy Venus (4:25)
- Virgin's Dance (4:09)
- Vestal Aria (4:25)
- Nightingale (4:17)
- Purity (3:21)
