= Frank Cottrell-Boyce =

British screenwriter, novelist and actor (born 1959)

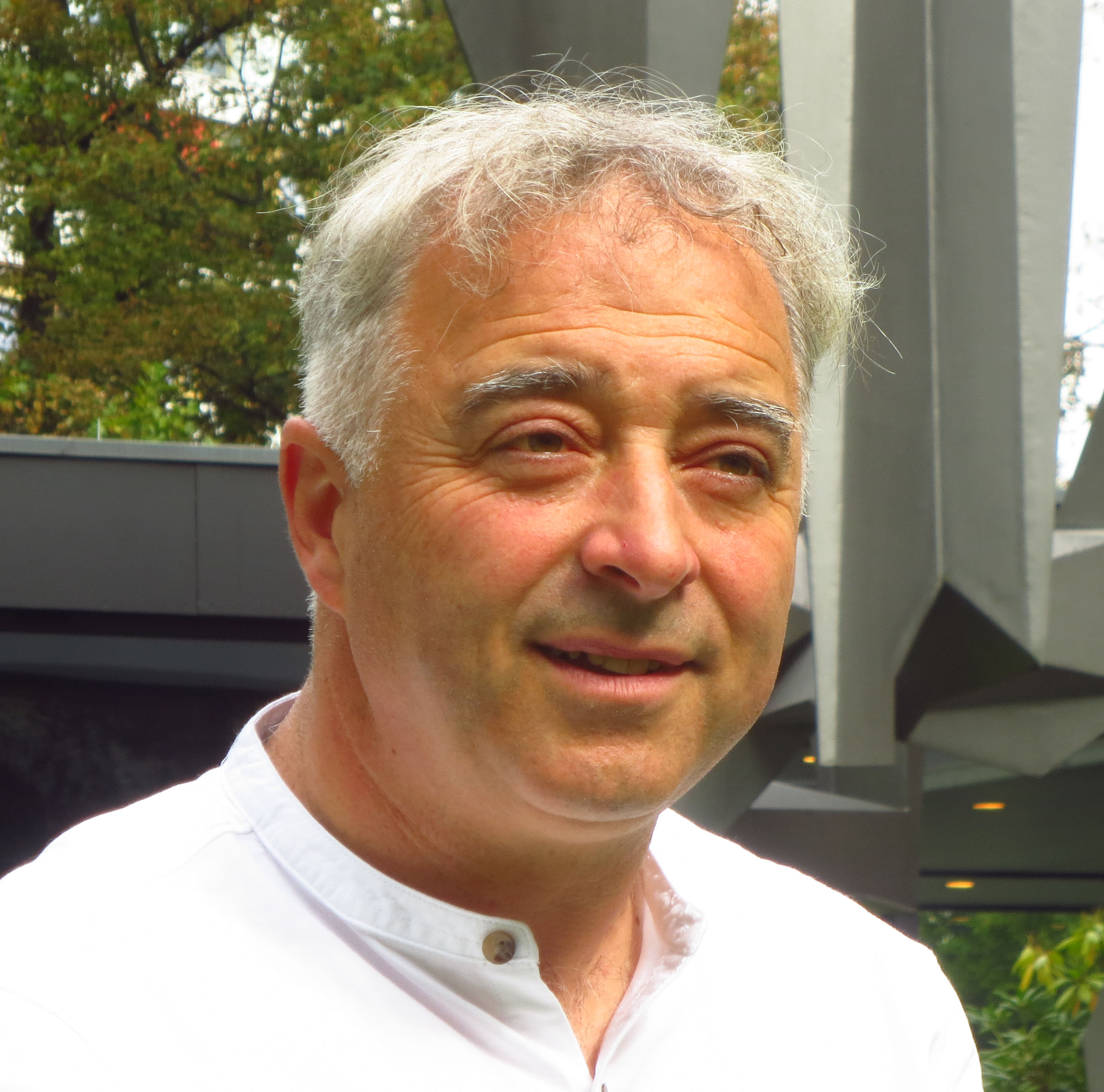
- Cottrell-Boyce at the 2015 Berlin International Literature Festival
- Born: Francis G. Boyce; 23 September 1959 (age 67); Bootle, England
- Education: Keble College, Oxford
- Occupations: Scriptwriter, author
- Spouse: Denise Cottrell (m. 1983)
- Children: 7
- Writing career
- Period: c. 1984–present
- Genres: Screenplays, children's novels
- Notable awards: Carnegie Medal; 2004; Guardian Children's Fiction Prize; 2012; Children's Laureate 2024–26

Frank Cottrell-Boyce (né Francis G. Boyce; born 23 September 1959) is a British screenwriter, novelist and occasional actor, known for his children's fiction and for his collaborations with film director Michael Winterbottom. He has achieved fame as the writer for the 2012 Summer Olympics opening ceremony and for sequels to Chitty Chitty Bang Bang: The Magical Car, a children's classic by Ian Fleming.

Cottrell-Boyce has won two major British awards for children's books: the 2004 Carnegie Medal for Millions, which originated as a film script, and the 2012 Guardian Children's Fiction Prize for The Unforgotten Coat, which was commissioned by a charity. In July 2024, he was appointed as Children's Laureate, for a two-year period, succeeding Joseph Coelho.

== Personal life ==
Boyce was born in 1959 in Bootle, near Liverpool, to a Catholic family. He moved to Rainhill, while still at primary school. He attended St Bartholomew's Primary School in Rainhill and West Park Grammar School. He was greatly influenced by reading Moomins growing up. He read English at Keble College, Oxford, where he went on to earn a doctorate. He wrote criticism for the magazine Living Marxism.

== Marriage ==
He met Denise Cottrell, a fellow Keble undergraduate, and they married in 1983 in Keble College chapel; they combined their surnames. Together they have seven children. He is also a patron of the Insight Film Festival, a biennial, interfaith festival held in Manchester, UK, to make positive contributions to understanding, respect and community cohesion. Aidan Cottrell-Boyce, one of the couple's sons, is also a writer.

In March 2026, Cottrell-Boyce was awarded the Honorary Freedom of the Borough for the Metropolitan Borough of Sefton.

== Career ==
After he met Michael Winterbottom, the two collaborated on Forget About Me. Winterbottom made five further films based on screenplays written by Cottrell-Boyce, Butterfly Kiss, Welcome to Sarajevo, The Claim, 24 Hour Party People and Code 46. Their 2005 collaboration, A Cock and Bull Story, is their last according to Cottrell-Boyce, who asked that his contribution be credited to "Martin Hardy", a pseudonym. He told Variety, "I just had to move on ... what better way to walk away than by giving Winterbottom a good script for free?"

Other film directors with whom Cottrell-Boyce has worked include Danny Boyle (Millions), Alex Cox (Revengers Tragedy), Richard Laxton (Grow Your Own) and Anand Tucker (Hilary and Jackie).

Cottrell-Boyce has been praised by Roger Ebert as one of the few truly inventive modern-day screenwriters. He has spoken against the "three-act structure" and the "hero's journey" formulas, which are often regarded as axiomatic truths in the business. Perhaps his most famous example of this is in 24 Hour Party People where the character of Anthony Wilson states that "Scott Fitzgerald said there are no second acts in American lives. This is Manchester. We do things differently. This is the second act", which Cottrell-Boyce has stated was due to criticism of the script not following the three-act structure.

Cottrell-Boyce has adapted novels for the screen and written children's fiction. His first novel Millions was based on his own screenplay for the film of the same name; it was published by Macmillan in 2004. Cottrell-Boyce won the annual Carnegie Medal from the British librarians, recognising it as the year's best children's book published in the U.K. His next novel, Framed, he made the shortlist for both the Carnegie and the Whitbread Children's Book Award. He adapted it as a screenplay for a 2009 BBC television film. He made the Carnegie shortlist again for Cosmic (2008). In 2011, he was commissioned to write a sequel to the Ian Fleming children's book Chitty Chitty Bang Bang, which was published in October 2011 as Chitty Chitty Bang Bang Flies Again. In addition to Coronation Street, he wrote many episodes of the soap opera Brookside, as well as its spin-offs Damon and Debbie and South.

He wrote and staged his first original theatre production Proper Clever at the Liverpool Playhouse during the city's European Capital of Culture year, 2008. On 18 September 2010, he co-presented the Papal Visit at Hyde Park with TV personality Carol Vorderman. In June 2012, he assumed the position of Professor of Reading (the first such professorship) at Liverpool Hope University.

Cottrell-Boyce was the writer of the 2012 Summer Olympics opening ceremony, whose storyline he based on Shakespeare's The Tempest. He collaborated with director Danny Boyle and other members of the creative team, including designer Mark Tildesley, in the development of the story and themes, and wrote "short documents that told the story of each segment" to provide context for choreographers, builders and other participants. He also wrote the brochure, the stadium announcements and the media guide for presenter Huw Edwards.

Three months later, Cottrell-Boyce won the 2012 Guardian Children's Fiction Prize for The Unforgotten Coat. That story of a cross-cultural friendship was inspired by a Mongolian girl he met as a writer visiting her school, whose family was subsequently deported by the British immigration office. It was commissioned by Reader Organisation of Liverpool and 50,000 copies were given away. The Guardian Prize is judged by a panel of British children's writers and recognises the year's best book by an author who has not yet won it. Interviewed by the sponsoring newspaper, Cottrell-Boyce told The Guardian that "I'm definitely a children's writer[;] that's what I want to be. I'm always trying to get rid of everything else. ... The movies I'm doing are ones that have been on the blocks for a long time."

Cottrell-Boyce was awarded an Honorary Doctorate of Literature at Edge Hill University on 16 July 2013.

In 2014, Cottrell-Boyce wrote an episode of Doctor Who, titled "In the Forest of the Night". He also wrote the second episode of the tenth series, "Smile". In September 2015, Cottrell-Boyce held the keynote speech at the Children's and Young Adult Program of the 15th Berlin International Literature Festival.

In January 2018, he was on the victorious Keble College, Oxford University Challenge "famous alumni" team; he won almost all of the points scored by Keble (total score 240) and was lionized on social media as a consequence; Reading University scored 0 in that game, thus making television history.

Cottrell-Boyce is an advocate for reading aloud and patron of The Reader Organisation. a charity that works through volunteers to bring literature to everyone, through reading aloud in prisons, care homes and other community spaces. In July 2024, he was appointed as Children's Laureate for the term 2024 to 2026, succeeding Joseph Coelho.

== Novels ==
- Millions (2004)
- Framed (2005)
- Cosmic (2008)
- Desirable (2008)
- The Unforgotten Coat (2011)
- Chitty Chitty Bang Bang Flies Again (2011)
- Chitty Chitty Bang Bang and the Race Against Time (2012)
- Chitty Chitty Bang Bang Over the Moon (2013)
- The Astounding Broccoli Boy (2015)
- Sputnik's Guide to Life on Earth (2016)
- Runaway Robot (2019)
- Noah's Gold (2021)
- The Wonder Brothers (2023)

== Appearances ==
- March 2010 – Desert Island Discs
- December 2017 and 2025 - University Challenge

== Writing credits ==
=== Television ===
Production	Notes	Broadcaster
Brookside	"Double Talk" (1987); "Reconnection" (1987); "Fish" (1989); "Glasses" (1989)	Channel 4
Damon and Debbie	Television miniseries (1987)	Channel 4
South	Television miniseries (1988)	ITV
The Real Eddy English	Television miniseries (1989)	Channel 4
Forget About Me	Television film (1990)	Thames Television
In Suspicious Circumstances	"An Uncommon Murder" (1992); "Unjust Deserts" (1992)	ITV
Crime Story	"All Good Friends" (1992)	ITV
A Woman's Guide to Adultery	"Episode #1.1" (1993); "Episode #1.2" (1993); "Episode #1.3" (1993)	ITV
Coronation Street	"Episode #1.3207" (1991); "Episode #1.3243" (1991); "Episode #1.3399" (1992); "Episode #1.3801" (1995)	ITV
New York Crossing	Television film (1996)	RAI
Saint-Ex	Television film (1996)	BBC
Springhill	Co-creator (1996–1997)	Sky
Captain Star	"The Atomic Alarm Clock" (1997); "Day of the Zooties" (1997); "The Worm Turns" (1997); "The Edge of the Universe" (1997)	ITV
God on Trial	Television film (2008)	BBC Two; PBS
Framed	Television film (2009)	BBC One
London 2012 Olympic Opening Ceremony: Isles of Wonder	Television film (2012)	BBC One
Doctor Who	"In the Forest of the Night" (2014); "Smile" (2017)	BBC One
Stephen	"Episode 1" (2021); "Episode 3" (2021)	ITV

=== Film ===
Year	Title	Director	Distributor
1995	Butterfly Kiss	Michael Winterbottom	Electric
1997	Welcome to Sarajevo	Michael Winterbottom	Warner Bros. Pictures
1998	Hilary and Jackie	Anand Tucker	Channel 4 Films (UK), October Films (U.S.)
2000	Pandaemonium	Julien Temple	Optimum Releasing
2000	The Claim	Michael Winterbottom	Pathé (UK), United Artists (US)
2002	24 Hour Party People	Michael Winterbottom	Pathé (UK), United Artists (US)
2002	Revengers Tragedy	Alex Cox	World Cinema Ltd.
2003	Code 46	Michael Winterbottom	MGM
2004	Millions	Danny Boyle	Pathé Distribution (UK), Fox Searchlight Pictures (USA)
2005	A Cock and Bull Story	Michael Winterbottom	Redbus Film Distribution
2007	Grow Your Own	Richard Laxton	Pathé, Warp Films
2013	The Railway Man	Jonathan Teplitzky	Lionsgate (UK), The Weinstein Company (US)
2017	Goodbye Christopher Robin	Simon Curtis	Fox Searchlight Pictures
2018	Sometimes Always Never	Carl Hunter	Parkland Entertainment (UK), Blue Fox Entertainment (USA)
2023	Kensuke's Kingdom	Neil Boyle & Kirk Hendry	Le Pacte (France)
2024	The Beautiful Game	Thea Sharrock	Netflix

== Awards and nominations ==
Year	Award	Work	Category	Result	Reference
1993	Writers' Guild of Great Britain Award	Coronation Street	TV - Original Drama Serial (with Paul Abbott, Martin Allen, Ken Blakeson, Tom Elliott, Barry Hill, Stephen Mallatratt, Julian Roach, Adele Rose, Patrea Smallacombe, John Stevenson, Peter Whalley, Mark Wadlow and Phil Woods)	Won	
1999	British Academy Film Awards	Hilary and Jackie	Best Screenplay - Adapted	Nominated	
1999	Golden Satellite Award	Hilary and Jackie	Best Motion Picture Screenplay - Adaption	Nominated	
2001	British Independent Film Award	The Claim	Best Screenplay	Nominated	
2004	Sitges - Catalan International Film Festival	Code 46	Best Screenplay	Won	
2005	British Independent Film Award	Millions	Best Screenplay	Won	
2005	Humanitas Prize	Millions	Feature Film Category	Nominated	
2007	Chlotrudis Awards	A Cock and Bull Story	Best Adapted Screenplay	Won	
2014	Australian Film Critics Association Awards	The Railway Man	Best Screenplay (with Andy Paterson)	Nominated	
2014	Film Critics Circle of Australia Awards	The Railway Man	Best Script (with Andy Paterson)	Won	
2015	Australian Film Institute Award	The Railway Man	Best Adapted Screenplay (with Andy Paterson)	Won	

== Awards ==
- 2004: Buch des Monats des Instituts für Jugendliteratur/Book of the Month by the Institute for Youth Literature (Germany), Millions
- 2004: Carnegie Medal Winner - Millions
- 2004: Guardian Children's Fiction Prize, shortlist, Millions
- 2004: Whitbread Award for Childrens Book, shortlist, Millions
- 2004: Luchs des Jahres (Germany), Millions
- 2004: Eule des Monats (Germany), Millions
- 2005: Branford Boase Award, shortlist, Millions
- 2005: Carnegie Medal, shortlist, Framed
- 2005: Blue Peter Book Award, shortlist, Framed
- 2006: Die besten 7 (Germany), Framed
- 2008: Guardian Children's Fiction Prize, shortlist, Cosmic
- 2009: Carnegie Medal, shortlist, Cosmic
- 2011: Gelett Burgess Children's Book Award, Honors, Cosmic
- 2011: Costa Book Award for Children's Book, shortlist, The Unforgotten Coat
- 2012: Elected Fellow of the Royal Society of Literature
- 2012: Guardian Children's Fiction Prize Winner - The Unforgotten Coat
- 2013: Honorary Doctorate of Literature at Edge Hill University
- 2024: Children's Laureate 2024-26
- 2026: Honorary Freedom of the Borough for the Metropolitan Borough of Sefton.

Cultural offices
Preceded by Joseph Coelho	Children's Laureate of the United Kingdom; 2024–2026	Incumbent
