= Eden Royce =

Black American Gothic horror writer

- Born: Pennsylvania, USA
- Writing career
- Genre: gothic horror
- Notable awards: Bram Stoker Award (2024); Shirley Jackson Award (2024); World Fantasy Award for Best Long Fiction (2026)
- Website: www.edenroyce.com

Eden Royce is a Black American gothic horror writer.

== Early life and background ==
Royce was born in Pennsylvania and grew up in Charleston, South Carolina.

== Career ==
Royce references the local Gullah-Geechee culture in her writing. As a short story writer, her work has appeared in anthologies and magazines such as Apex Magazine and Strange Horizons, as well as two collections. She is also known for writing articles and reviews.

In 2016, Royce was awarded the Diverse Worlds Grant by The Speculative Literature Foundation.

Her 2021 novel, Root Magic, won the Mythopeic Fantasy Award for Children's Literature.

Royce's novel The Creepening of Dogwood House won the 2024 Bram Stoker Award for Middle Grade Novel.

Her 2024 novella, Hollow Tongue, won the 2024 Shirley Jackson Award for Best Novella.

Her 2025 novella, Psychopomp & Circumstance, was a finalist for the 2026 Ignyte Award for Outstanding Novella. It won the 2026 World Fantasy Award for Best Long Fiction.

== Personal life ==
She is married and living in Kent, England.

== Bibliography ==
=== Novels ===
- Root Magic (2021)
- Conjure Island (2023)
- The Creepening of Dogwood House (2024, Middle Grade)

=== Novellas ===
- Hollow Tongue (2024)
- Psychopomp & Circumstance (2025)

=== Collections ===
- Spook Lights: Southern Gothic Horror (2015)
- Spook Lights II: Southern Gothic Horror (2017)

=== Anthologies ===
- Forever Vacancy: A Colors in Darkness Anthology (2017) with Mya Lairis and Kenya Moss-Dyme

=== Short fiction ===
- "9 Mystery Rose" (2010)
- "Finger Food" (2010)
- "With the Turn of a Key" (2010)
- "The Omega File" (2011) with Darin Kennedy
- "Red Sun, Autumn Rose" (2011)
- "Devil's Playground" (2011)
- "Infernal Proposal" (2011)
- "Hag Ride" (2011)
- "Rhythm" (2013)
- "The Death Bringer" (2013)
- "Voodooesque" (2015)
- "Doc Buzzard's Coffin" (2015)
- "Hand of Glory" (2015)
- "Homegoing" (2015)
- "Path of the War Chief" (2015)
- "Since Hatchet Was a Hammer" (2015)
- "The Choking Kind" (2015)
- "The Watered Soul" (2015)
- "Basque of the Red Death" (2015)
- "Graverobbing Negress Seeks Employment" (2017)
- "A Long Way from the Ritz" (2017)
- "Blood Read" (2017)
- "Carolina Blue" (2017)
- "Chilly Bears - 10¢" (2017)
- "Folk" (2017)
- "Grandmother's Bed" (2017)
- "Haints of Azalea Hall" (2017)
- "The Dating Pool" (2017)
- "The Laughter of Crows" (2017)
- "The Mermaid Storm" (2017)
- "The Strange Dowry of Spinster Pumpkin" (2017)
- "To-Do List" (2017)
- "Sweetgrass Blood" (2017)
- "Soupie's Lover" (2017)
- "Crickets Sing for Naomi" (2017)
- "Shine, Blackberry Wine" (2017)
- "A Cure for Ghosts" (2017)
- "Caretaker" (2018)
- "Every Good-bye Ain't Gone" (2018)
- "For Southern Girls When the Zodiac Ain't Near Enough" (2018)
- "One If by Sea" (2018)
- "Witches for Mars" (2019)
- "The Art Dealer" (2026)
