= Paul Adam (English novelist) =

English novelist

Paul Adam (born 1958 in Coventry) is an English writer of novels for both adults and younger readers.

Adam moved to Sheffield before the age of one. He studied law at the University of Nottingham, then began a career in journalism, working both in England, in his childhood town of Sheffield, and Rome. Since then he has written 11 critically acclaimed thrillers for adults and the Max Cassidy series of thrillers for younger readers about a teenage escapologist, the first of which, Escape from Shadow Island, won the Salford Children's Book Award. He has also written film and television scripts.

Adam lived in Nottingham for many years but now lives in Sheffield with his wife and two children.

== Works ==
- An Exceptional Corpse (1993)
- A Nasty Dose of Death (1994)
- Toxin (1995)
- Unholy Trinity (1999)
- Shadow Chasers (2000)
- Genesis II (2001)
- Flash Point a.k.a. Oracle Lake (2003)
- Sleeper a.k.a. The Rainaldi Quartet (2004)
- Enemy Within (2005)
- Knife Edge (2008)
- Escape From Shadow Island (2009)
- Paganini's Ghost: A Mystery (2010)
- Jaws of Death (2011)
- Attack at Dead Man's Bay (2012)
- Dixieland (2013)
- The Hardanger Riddle (2019)
