= Walden Media =

American film investor, distributor, and publishing company

Walden Media, LLC
- Logo used since 2003
- Type: Subsidiary
- Industry: Film; Television
- Founded: 2000; 26 years ago
- Founder: Micheal Flaherty; Cary Granat
- Headquarters: Los Angeles, California, United States
- Key people: Frank Smith (president & CEO); Benjamin Tappan (president of production)
- Parent: Anschutz Entertainment Group (2001–present)
- Divisions: Walden Pond Press
- Website: walden.com

Walden Media, LLC is an American media company that develops, produces, and finances feature films and television series for the U.S. and global markets. Its films focus on stories of courage drawn from biographies, historical events, and literature adaptations, as well as original screenplays. The company has also produced feature documentaries.

The corporate headquarters of Walden Media are located in Los Angeles, California. The company is owned by the Christian conservative Philip Anschutz, who has said he expects their movies "to be entertaining, but also to be life affirming and to carry a moral message."

The company's notable releases include Holes in 2003, Because of Winn-Dixie in 2005, Charlotte's Web in 2006, Bridge to Terabithia, in 2007, three adaptations of The Chronicles of Narnia in 2005, 2008 and 2010, Ramona and Beezus in 2010, and both A Dog's Purpose and Wonder in 2017. All of these films are adaptations of popular books. Walden Media operates Walden Pond Press, a joint venture with HarperCollins, which publishes middle grade books.

== History ==
Walden Media was founded in 2000 by Micheal Flaherty and Cary Granat as a movie, television, publishing and Internet enterprise whose goal is to teach and entertain kids. Granat was president of Miramax's Dimension Films division, and Flaherty came from the world of education. The two were housemates at Tufts University before following different paths, and later reunited to form the company. The company's formation was officially announced in May 2001.

During the summer of 2001, Walden entered into their first film deals; with Phoenix Pictures to finance and co-produce Holes, an adaption of the children's book of the same name, in July and with director James Cameron to distribute his documentary Ghosts of the Abyss, focusing on the remains of the RMS Titanic, in August. In December 2001, Walden announced that they had acquired the rights to produce films based on The Chronicles of Narnia. In late 2001, Anschutz Entertainment Group purchased a majority stake in the company, leaving the founders as minority shareholders.

In February 2002, Walden entered into a partnership with Summit Entertainment, who would pre-sell their films internationally. In September, Walden entered into a two-year first-look agreement with The Walt Disney Company following their acquisition of the distribution rights to Ghosts of the Abyss in North America and the United Kingdom, and Holes in a majority of territories. Walden's first film, Pulse: A Stomp Odyssey, was released theatrically that same month.

In July 2004, Walden signed a five-picture production deal with 20th Century Fox. On August 9, 2006, Walden Media announced an extension to their partnership with Fox Filmed Entertainment, which would release education-themed family-friendly pictures that would be released under G or PG ratings. All films would be released under the 20th Century Fox banner. The company, now named "Fox-Walden", announced the release of its first four films in May 2007.

In March 2008, Michael Bostick, formerly of Imagine Films, was hired as creative officer. Cary Granat was released from his co-CEO title effective December 1, 2008, with Bostick replacing him. Walden Media created a joint publishing venture with HarperCollins during the same year called Walden Pond Press. On October 2, 2008, it was announced that Fox-Walden would reduce its staff and cease operations as a standalone company. Due to the number of films released under the venture, which had bombed at the box office in North America, the company would instead be folded into 20th Century Fox as a studio division. Nevertheless, the downsizing of Fox-Walden did not affect the partnership between both companies and they would still release family-oriented films under the label.

In December 2013, Frank Smith was named Chief operating officer (COO), having worked with Anschutz Film Group for ten years.

In April 2023, Benjamin Tappan, a former EPIX executive, was named President of Production for Walden, overseeing the company's film and television development and production.

== Education program ==
Walden Media is unique among film production and distribution companies in that it works with teachers, museums, and national organizations to develop supplemental educational programs and materials associated with its films and the original events and/or novels that inspire the films.

Walden Media offers in-class teaching tools like educational guides and teacher kits and sponsors seminars and forums for teachers to discuss their practice and to share ideas on using media in the classroom. Directors, writers, and stars of the productions participate in these events.

In 2006, Walden Media sponsored the "Break the World Reading Record with Charlotte's Web". At noon on Wednesday, December 13, 547,826 readers in 2,451 locations, 50 states and 28 countries read an excerpt from Charlotte's Web, breaking the world record of 155,528 students from 737 schools in the United Kingdom who read William Wordsworth's poem, "Daffodils" in 2004.

== Filmography ==
Key to the colors used below
	Type of film
A	Animated film
H	Live-action and animated film
L	Live-action film
D	Documentary film

=== Feature films ===
	Title	Release date	Co-production(s)	Distributor(s)	Ref.
D	Ghosts of the Abyss	April 11, 2003	Earthship Productions; Ascot Elite Entertainment Group; Golden Village; Telepool and UGC PH	Buena Vista Pictures Distribution; Summit Entertainment	
L	Holes	April 18, 2003	Walt Disney Pictures; Phoenix Pictures; Chicago Pacific Entertainment	Buena Vista Pictures Distribution; Summit Entertainment	
L	Around the World in 80 Days	June 16, 2004	Spanknyce Films; Mostow/Lieberman Productions	Buena Vista Pictures Distribution; Summit Entertainment	
L	I Am David	December 3, 2004	Film and General	Lions Gate Films; Summit Entertainment	
D	Aliens of the Deep	January 28, 2005	Walt Disney Pictures; Earthship Productions	Buena Vista Pictures Distribution	
L	Because of Winn-Dixie	February 18, 2005	N/A	20th Century Fox	
L	The Chronicles of Narnia: The Lion, the Witch and the Wardrobe	December 9, 2005	Walt Disney Pictures	Buena Vista Pictures Distribution	
L	Hoot	May 5, 2006	The Kennedy/Marshall Company	New Line Cinema	
L	How to Eat Fried Worms	August 25, 2006	Gran Via Productions	New Line Cinema	
L	Charlotte's Web	December 15, 2006	The K Entertainment Company; Nickelodeon Movies	Paramount Pictures	
L	Bridge to Terabithia	February 16, 2007	Walt Disney Pictures	Buena Vista Pictures Distribution; Summit Entertainment	
L	The Seeker: The Dark is Rising	October 5, 2007	N/A	20th Century Fox (Fox-Walden)	
L	Mr. Magorium's Wonder Emporium	November 16, 2007	Mandate Pictures	20th Century Fox (Fox-Walden); Mandate Pictures	
L	The Water Horse: Legend of the Deep	December 25, 2007	Columbia Pictures; Revolution Studios; Strike Entertainment; Ecosse Films; Weta Workshop; Beacon Pictures	Sony Pictures Releasing	
L	Nim's Island	April 4, 2008	N/A	20th Century Fox (Fox-Walden); Universal Pictures; Summit Entertainment	
L	The Chronicles of Narnia: Prince Caspian	May 16, 2008	Walt Disney Pictures	Walt Disney Studios Motion Pictures	
L	Journey to the Center of the Earth	July 11, 2008	New Line Cinema	Warner Bros. Pictures	
L	City of Ember	October 10, 2008	Playtone	20th Century Fox (Fox-Walden); Summit Entertainment	
L	Bandslam	August 14, 2009	N/A	Summit Entertainment	
L	Tooth Fairy	January 22, 2010	Mayhem Pictures; Blumhouse Productions; Dune Entertainment	20th Century Fox	
L	Ramona and Beezus	July 23, 2010	Di Novi Pictures; Dune Entertainment	20th Century Fox	
D	Waiting for "Superman"	September 24, 2010	Participant Media	Paramount Vantage	
L	The Chronicles of Narnia: The Voyage of the Dawn Treader	December 10, 2010	Dune Entertainment	20th Century Fox	
L	Journey 2: The Mysterious Island	February 10, 2012	New Line Cinema; Contrafilm	Warner Bros. Pictures	
L	Tooth Fairy 2	March 6, 2012	N/A	20th Century Fox Home Entertainment	
L	Won't Back Down	September 28, 2012	Gran Via Productions	20th Century Fox	
L	Chasing Mavericks	October 26, 2012	Deuce Three Productions	20th Century Fox	
L	Parental Guidance	December 25, 2012	Chernin Entertainment; Face Productions; Dune Entertainment	20th Century Fox	
L	Return to Nim's Island	March 15, 2013	ARC Entertainment	Hallmark Channel	
L	Dear Dumb Diary	September 6, 2013	ARC Entertainment; Zucker Productions; Triple D Productions	Hallmark Channel	
L	The Giver	August 15, 2014	N/A	The Weinstein Company	
L	Everest	September 18, 2015	Cross Creek Pictures; Working Title Films	Universal Pictures	
L	The BFG	July 1, 2016	Walt Disney Pictures; Amblin Entertainment; Reliance Entertainment; The Kennedy/Marshall Company; The Roald Dahl Story Company	Walt Disney Studios Motion Pictures; Reliance Entertainment; Mister Smith Entertainment	
L	The Resurrection of Gavin Stone	January 20, 2017	Blumhouse Tilt; Vertical Church Films	WWE Studios; BH Tilt	
L	A Dog's Purpose	January 27, 2017	Universal Pictures; Amblin Entertainment; Reliance Entertainment; Pariah Entertainment Group	Universal Pictures; Reliance Entertainment; Mister Smith Entertainment	
L	Wonder	November 17, 2017	Participant Media; Mandeville Films	Lionsgate	
A	The Star	November 17, 2017	Columbia Pictures; Sony Pictures Animation; Affirm Films; Franklin Entertainment; The Jim Henson Company	Sony Pictures Releasing	
L	A Dog's Journey	May 17, 2019	Universal Pictures; Amblin Entertainment; Reliance Entertainment; Alibaba Pictures; Pariah Entertainment Group	Universal Pictures; Reliance Entertainment; Mister Smith Entertainment	
H	Dora and the Lost City of Gold	August 9, 2019	Paramount Players; Nickelodeon Movies; Media Rights Capital; Burr! Productions	Paramount Pictures	
L	Playing with Fire	November 8, 2019	Paramount Players; Nickelodeon Movies; Broken Road Productions	Paramount Pictures	
L	A Babysitter's Guide to Monster Hunting	October 15, 2020	The Montecito Picture Company	Netflix	
L	Finch	November 5, 2021	Amblin Entertainment; Reliance Entertainment; ImageMovers; Misher Films	Apple TV+	
A	Rumble	December 15, 2021	Paramount Animation; WWE Studios; Reel FX Animation Studios	Paramount+	
L	Nuremberg	November 7, 2025	Bluestone Entertainment; Mythology Entertainment; Titan Media	Sony Pictures Classics	
Upcoming
L	Billion Dollar Spy	TBA	Weed Road Pictures; Pioneer Stillking Films; HanWay Films	TBA	
A	Flat Stanley and the Eye of Odin	TBA	20th Century Animation	Disney+	

=== Television series ===
Title	Years	Network	Co-production(s)	Ref.
The Baby-Sitters Club	2020–2021	Netflix	co-production with Terrible Baby Productions, Paulilu, and Michael De Luca Productions	
Manhunt	2024	Apple TV+	co-production with Apple Studios, Lionsgate Television, Dovetale Productions, POV Entertainment, Monarch Pictures and 3 Arts Entertainment	

== Etymology and logo ==
The company is named after Walden Pond in Concord, Massachusetts. Its logo is a stone skipping across a pond.
