= Micheal Flaherty =

American educational film producer

Micheal Flaherty is an American educator and the co-founder and former president of Walden Media, a production company. Through Walden, he has developed educational materials and programs.

Flaherty lives in Lexington, Massachusetts with his wife, whom he married in October 1999, and their three children, who were previously homeschooled. He is an evangelical Christian.
