= Elana K. Arnold =

American children's author

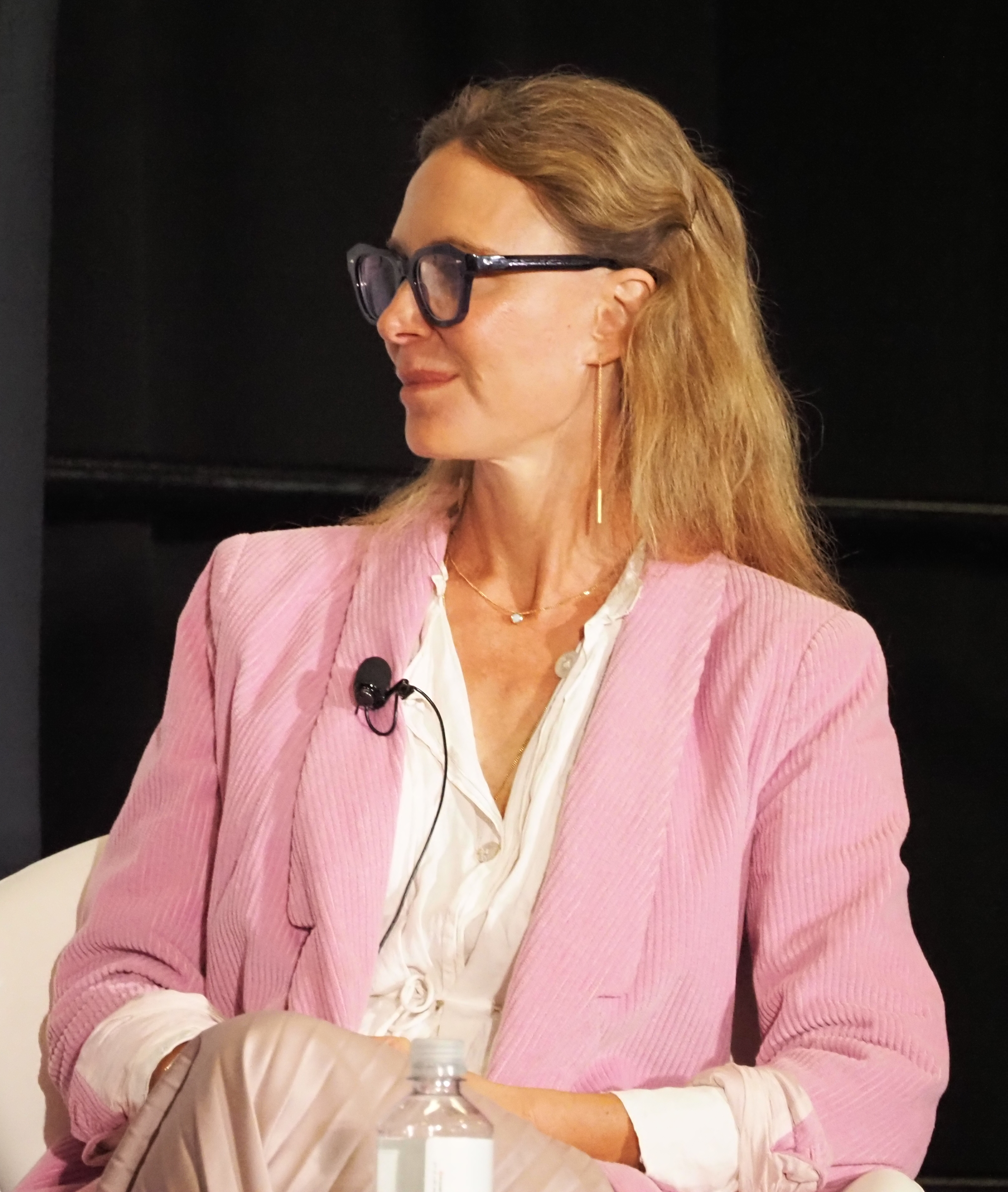
- Occupation: Author
- Website: elanakarnold.com

Elana Kuczynski Arnold is an American children's and young adult author. Her 2017 novel What Girls Are Made Of was a finalist for the 2017 National Book Award for Young People's Literature, and her 2018 novel Damsel was named a Michael L. Printz Award Honor title in 2019.

In 2022, three of Arnold's books (Damsel, Red Hood, and What Girls Are Made Of ) were listed among 52 novels banned by the Alpine School District following the implementation of Utah H.B. 374, “Sensitive Materials In Schools."

== Biography ==
Arnold obtained a Bachelor of Arts degree in Comparative Literature from University of California, Irvine. In 1998, she Master of Arts degree in English and Creative Writing from the University of California, Davis.

Arnold now teaches with Hamline University's Master of Fine Arts program focusing on Writing for Children and Young Adults.

She lives in Southern California.

== Awards and honors ==
Nine of Arnold's book are Junior Library Guild selections: A Boy Called Bat (2017), Bat and the Waiting Game (2018), Damsel (2018), Bat at the End of Everything (2019), The House That Wasn't There (2021), Red Hood (2021), Starla Jean (2021), and Just Harriet (2022).

In 2021, Publishers Weekly named Red Hood one of the top ten young adult novels of the year.

Awards for Arnold's writing
Year	Title	Award	Result	Ref
2015	Infaduous	Moonbeam Children's Book Award for Young Adult Fiction - General	Winner	
2016	Infaduous	Amelia Bloomer Book List	Selection	
2016	Infaduous	Westchester Fiction Award	Winner	
2017	What Girls Are Made Of	California Book Award	Finalist	
2017	What Girls Are Made Of	National Book Award for Young People's Literature	Finalist	
2018	What Girls Are Made Of	Amelia Bloomer Book List	Selection	
2018	Damsel	Booklist Editors' Choice: Books for Youth	Selection	
2019	Damsel	Amelia Bloomer Book List	Top 10	
2019	Damsel	Michael L. Printz Award	Honor	
2021	Red Hood	Amazing Audiobooks for Young Adults	Selection	
2021	Red Hood	Amelia Bloomer Book List	Top 10	

== Publications ==
=== Young adult novels ===
- Sacred (2012)
- Burning (2013)
- Splendor (2013)
- Infandous (2015)
- What Girls Are Made Of (2017)
- Damsel (2018)
- Red Hood (2020)
- The Blood Years (2022)

=== Middle grade books ===
- The Question of Miracles (2015)
- Far from Fair (2016)
- The House That Wasn't There (2021)
- Just Harriet (2022)

==== A Boy Called Bat series ====
- A Boy Called Bat (2017)
- Bat and the Waiting Game (2018)
- Bat and the End of Everything (2019)
- Bat and the Business of Ferrets (2025)

==== Starla Jean series ====
- Starla Jean, illustrated by A. N. Kang (2021)
- Starla Jean Takes the Cake (2022)
- Starla Jean Cracks the Case (2023)

=== Picture books ===
- What Riley Wore (2019)
- All by Himself? (2022)
- Pip and Zip (2022)

== Reception ==
In 2024 the Republican-dominated Utah Legislature passed a law mandating the removal of books deemed objectionable from all Utah public schools (including charter schools). On 2 August 2024 the Utah State School Board released its first list of banned books. Elana K. Arnold's young adult novel What Girls Are Made Of was on this list.
