= Geoff Marshall =

English video producer and YouTuber

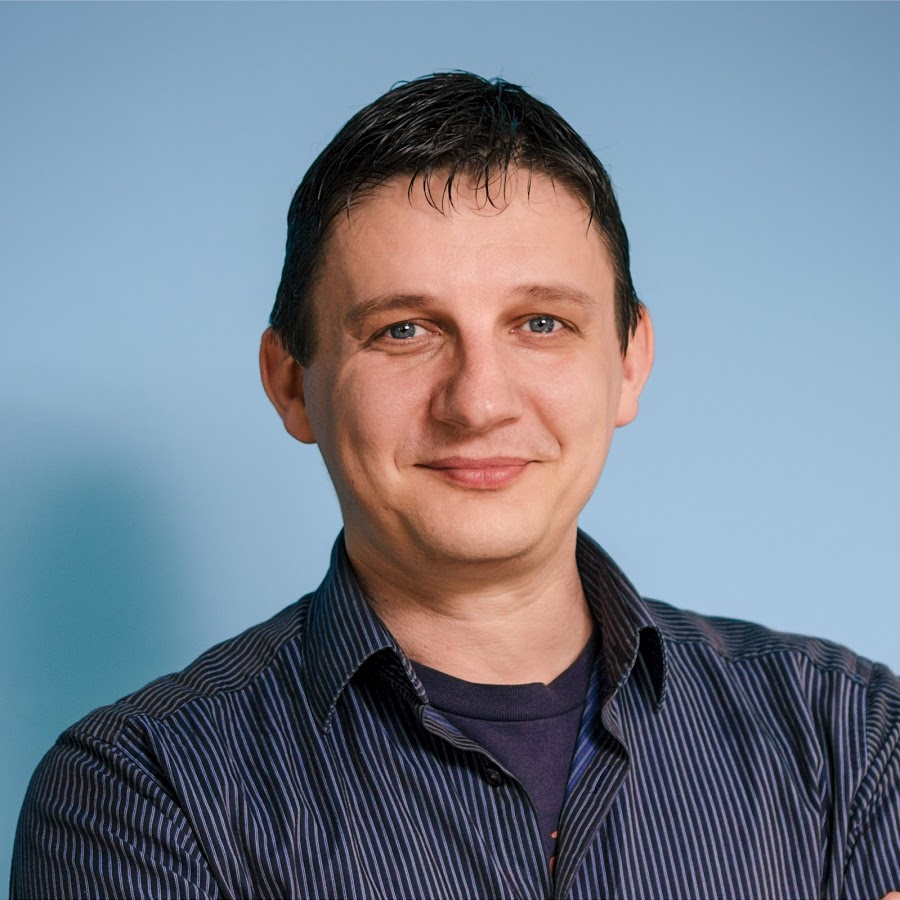
- Marshall in 2017
- Born: Geoffrey Marshall; August 1972 (age 54); Lambeth, London, England
- Occupations: Presenter; editor; YouTuber
- Years active: 2002–present
- Notable work: All The Stations

YouTube information
- Channel: Geoff Marshall
- Years active: 2006–present
- Genre: Transport
- Subscribers: 363 thousand
- Views: 109 million
- Last updated: 10 June 2026
- Website: geofftech.co.uk

Geoffrey Marshall (born August 1972) is an English video producer, performer, and author from London who runs a YouTube channel which is predominantly transport-themed. Born in London, he spent three years living in the United States between 2006 and 2009, and now resides in south London.

== Early life ==
Marshall was born in Lambeth, south London, to parents Roy and Christina. He went to school in Croydon and Sutton, and finished his studies at the age of 15. His interest in London Transport began as a child, when he and his cousins planned to go on all the bus routes. He started his own website in the 1990s. Marshall has worked in the IT industry.

== Tube Challenge ==
Marshall has twice held the world record for the Tube Challenge: travelling to all London Underground stations in the fastest time possible. His first record time to visit the then 270 stations was achieved with Neil Blake in 18 hours 35 minutes and 43 seconds in May 2004, on his seventh attempt. This beat the previous world record of 19 hours, 18 minutes and 45 seconds that was achieved by Jack Welsby in April 2002.

His second record time of 16 hours, 20 minutes and 27 seconds, was set in August 2013. A previous attempt which came close was covered by BBC News as part of London Underground's 150 year celebrations.

Marshall subsequently wrote the stage show TubeSpotting about his multiple attempts, which he performed at the Edinburgh Festival Fringe in 2014, and several times since at the London Transport Museum.

== Secrets of the Underground ==
Between 2013 and 2019, Marshall was a contributor to Londonist. One of the website's video series was Secrets of the Underground, in which Marshall presented little-known facts of the London Underground. The series originally featured just the 11 London Underground lines, but later episodes were produced for the DLR, Overground and Tramlink networks, as well as bonus episodes, and a satirical April Fools episode on the Cable Car. The series has over 17 million combined views. Marshall has continued to make Secrets of... videos on his own channel, including for the Elizabeth line and the Glasgow Subway.

== All the Stations ==
All the Stations was a project organised by Marshall and Vicki Pipe to visit all 2,563 UK railway stations in the summer of 2017. The pair filmed much of the journey, with daily updates posted on YouTube and other social media. A feature-length documentary about the journey was produced in 2018.

Funded through Kickstarter, the journey started on 7 May in Penzance and finished 105 days later on 19 August in Wick. The series consisted of 59 main videos and 12 bonus videos. Marshall and Pipe visited every station in Great Britain, including those that are served by only a small number of trains, including Shippea Hill station on 3 June, where 19 people joined them, meaning more passengers used the station in a single day than had in the whole of the previous year.

In 2019, Marshall and Pipe crowdfunded All the Stations Ireland, in which they spent three weeks visiting all 198 railway stations in Northern Ireland and the Republic of Ireland during March and April 2019. Subsequently, they spent three days in July 2019 visiting the Isle of Man to travel to every station on the island.

== TV and radio appearances ==
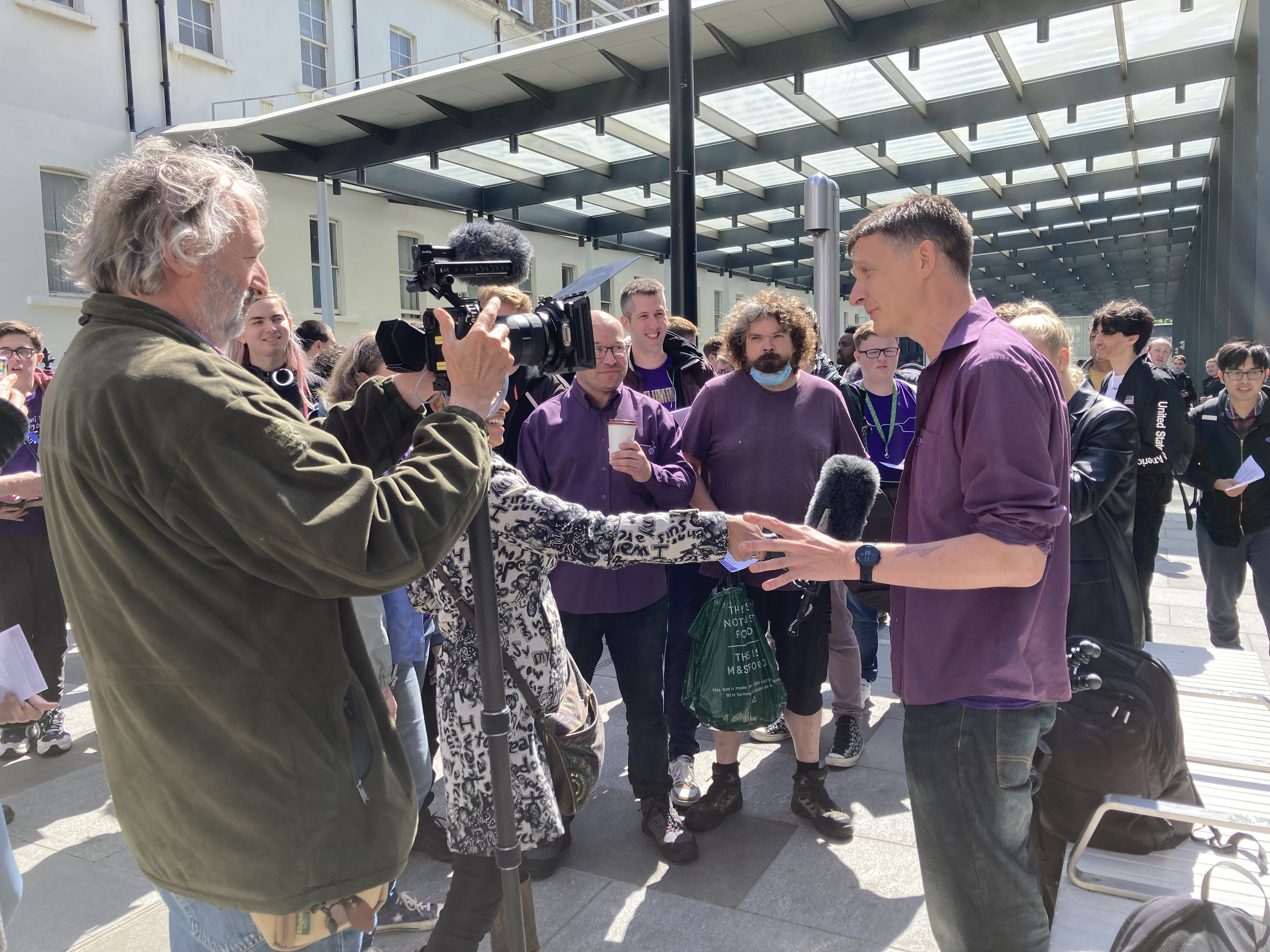
Geoff Marshall being interviewed at the opening of the Elizabeth line in May 2022

Marshall occasionally gives interviews on London TV and radio concerning transport stories, but first appeared on TV featuring in series 1 of ITV documentary The Tube. The second episode, titled "24 Hours", showed his unsuccessful attempt to beat Jack Welsby's Tube Challenge world record. This was followed later in 2003 by "Race Around The Underground", part of Carlton Television's Metroland documentary series, in which Marshall would have broken the record, had the Richmond Branch of the District Line not suffered a signal failure.

He appeared on Sky 1's quiz show The Fanatics, answering questions about the London Underground. He appeared in an episode of More4's The World's Most Beautiful Railway in September 2019, highlighting the Caledonian Sleeper and Corrour railway station in the Scottish Highlands.

== Underground: USA ==
Underground: USA was a 12-week documentary road trip which Marshall undertook between June and September 2009 in the US. He travelled to all 48 mainland states and, in each one, visited a town or a place that shared a name with a station on the London Underground map: for example, Epping, Maine, where the journey started. Despite having his filming equipment stolen during the trip, Marshall turned the story into a one-hour YouTube documentary, as well as publishing an accompanying book.

== Charity events ==
Marshall first organised a tube-based charity event in 2005 with Tube Relief, in response to the 7 July 2005 London bombings. Using the slogan "Not Afraid", around 50 people took part and raised over £11,000 for the London Bombings Relief Charitable Fund.

Subsequently, Marshall organised a series of Walk the Tube events to raise money for charities, by getting a group of people to visit every tube station, though not as a record attempt. These events took place in 2014, 2015, and 2016.

== Bibliography ==
- Marshall, Geoff (2013). Underground: USA. Blurb, Inc. ISBN 978-1304633927.
- Marshall, Geoff (2018). Tube Station Trivia. Capital Transport. ISBN 978-1-85414-431-7.
- Marshall, Geoff; Pipe, Vicki (2018). The Railway Adventures: Places, Trains, People and Stations. September Publishing. ISBN 978-1910463871.
- Marshall, Geoff; Pipe, Vicki (2020). The London Underground: 50 Things to See and Do. September Publishing. ISBN 978-1912836253.
- Pipe, Vicki; Marshall, Geoff (2020). Great British Railways: 50 Things to See and Do. September Publishing. ISBN 978-1912836284.
