= Tube Challenge =

Fastest time to travel to all London Underground Stations

A geographic 2021 map of the stations on the London Underground and the Docklands Light Railway

The Tube Challenge is the competition for the fastest time to travel to all London Underground stations, tracked as a Guinness World Record since 1960. The goal is to visit all the stations on the system, not necessarily all the lines; participants may connect between stations on foot, or by using other forms of scheduled public transport.

As of March 2025, the record for fastest completion (272 stations) is held by Robin Otter and Thomas Sheat, who completed the challenge in 17 hours, 46 minutes and 48 seconds on 10 August 2024.

Similar unofficial alternative tube challenges are also held where only specific stations or sections of railway are to be visited; however, not necessarily entirely on the London Underground network. Such challenges include:

- All Lines Challenge, where competitors ride all 11 London Underground lines.
- Bottle Challenge, where competitors visit all 50 London Underground stations which lie on or within the circle line loop.
- Croydon Tramlink Challenge, where competitors visit all 39 stops on the London Tramlink network.
- Docklands Light Railway (DLR) Challenge, where competitors visit all 45 DLR stations.
- Mouse Challenge, where competitors visit all 33 London Underground stations which lie within or on the two central branches of the northern line.
- Parks Challenge, where competitors visit all 24 London Underground stations with the word 'park' in their name along with taking an exterior photo of each station.
- Zone 1 Challenge, where competitors visit all 67 zone 1 London Underground stations.

== History ==
The first recorded challenge took place in 1959. Although many people have attempted the challenge and held the record since, they have not always been credited in the record books. In the earlier days of the challenge, participants were permitted to use private forms of transport (such as a car or bike) to move between stations. This led to times of less than 16 hours in some earlier records, and Guinness later changed the rules to ban private transport.

The following is a list of record holders that have appeared in the printed edition of the Guinness Book of Records. The record did not appear in the book until its eighth edition.

Date	Record holder(s)	Stations	Time
March 1960	George Hurst and Jane Barwick	264	18 hours, 35 minutes
9 September 1961	J Birch, B Phillips and N Storr	274	18 hours, 9 minutes
3 December 1960	K A Branch and J Branch	273	20 hours, 0 minutes
22 August 1963	Christopher Niekirk	272	14 hours, 58 minutes
4 July 1964	A Mortimer, J P Herting, D Corke and G Elliot	272	14 hours, 17 minutes
7 September 1965	Alan Paul Jenkins	273	16 hours, 57 minutes
1 November 1966	Leslie Burwood	273	15 hours, 53 minutes
1 September 1967	Leslie Burwood	277	14 hours, 33 minutes
3 September 1968	Leslie Burwood	277	15 hours, 0 minutes
27 June 1969	Anthony Durkin and Peter Griffiths	277	16 hours, 5 minutes
20 May 1980	John Trafford and Stephen Trafford	278	18 hours, 3 minutes
3 December 1981	Colm Mulvany	277	17 hours, 37 minutes
22 July 1982	Peter Robinson (youngest person to tour all stations, aged 8)	277	Not given
14 April 1986	Robert Robinson, Peter David Robinson, John Garde and Timothy John Clark	272	19 hours, 51 minutes, 14 seconds
30 July 1986	Robert Robinson, Peter David Robinson, Timothy Robinson, Timothy Clark and Richard Harris	272	18 hours, 41 minutes, 41 seconds
4 October 1994	Robert Robinson and Tom McLaughlin	270	18 hours, 18 minutes, 9 seconds
16 March 2000	Robert Robinson, Chris Loxton, Chris Stubley, Chris Whiteoak, Olly Rich and Adam Waller	272	19 hours, 57 minutes, 47 seconds
26 September 2006	Håkan Wolgé and Lars Andersson	275	18 hours, 25 minutes, 3 seconds
1 October 2013	Geoff Marshall and Anthony Smith	270	16 hours, 20 minutes, 27 seconds
21 May 2015	Steve Wilson and Andi James	270	15 hours, 45 minutes, 38 seconds
23 October 2023	Arthur Philipps, Ruairí O'Grady, John Mawdsley, Alex Rennie, Tim Livant, Joseph Solomon, Alex Sinclair, Yipeng Xu	272	18 hours, 08 minutes, 13 seconds
10 August 2024	Robin Otter and Thomas Sheat	272	17 hours, 46 minutes, 48 seconds

Between the 1960s and 1990s the record regularly appeared in the Guinness Book of Records, initially listed under "Underground Railways – circuit of", but later just under "Railways" and then "Trains". Since the change of publishing style of the book from the 2001 edition onwards, the record – although frequently broken – has only twice appeared in printed form, in the 2008 edition, and then the 2015 edition. More recent records have tended to be published online instead. Since the record has not regularly been published in the book, there have been two broad configurations on the system – one for 275 stations, and one for 270 once the East London Line was no longer part of the network.

=== 275 stations ===
On 3 April 2002 Jack Welsby set a new record time for 275 stations by traversing the system in 19 hours, 18 minutes and 45 seconds. Welsby made just one attempt, starting his route at Heathrow and finishing at Amersham.

This time was beaten on 4 May 2004 by Geoff Marshall and Neil Blake who achieved a new record time of 18 hours 35 minutes and 43 seconds. Their attempt began on the first train out of Amersham on the Metropolitan Line and ended at Upminster, and it took Guinness World Records four months to ratify it. A previous attempt had been broadcast on TV as part of The Tube TV series and another attempt had been televised as part of an ITV1 programme Metroland: Race Around the Underground on 16 October 2003.

Although this time stood for two years before being beaten by just five seconds by Samantha Cawley and Steve Wilson on 30 May 2006, it was not until Håkan Wolgé and Lars Andersson (both from Sweden) set a new record time for 275 stations that it appeared in the Guinness World Records book again, in the 2008 edition. They set a new record of 18 hours, 25 minutes and 3 seconds, on 26 September 2006.

=== 270 stations ===
In 2007, the closure of the East London Line (incorporated into London Overground) removed seven stations from the Underground network, while Wood Lane and Heathrow Terminal 5 both opened in 2008, resulting in the record being 'reset' several times in quick succession before the network settled on 270 stations for the following 13 years.

Subsequent holders of the 270-station record were Andi James and Steven Karahan, who set a time of 17 hours, 12 minutes and 43 seconds on 24 July 2008.

On 14 December 2009, James set another record with Martin Hazel and Steve Wilson, achieving a time of 16 hours, 44 minutes and 16 seconds. TfL used this route four years later as part of the Art on the Underground labyrinth project to mark the 150th anniversary of the London Underground, installing permanent designs at stations in the same order that the world record route had taken, and later appeared in an Information Capital article. The three became the first people to have held records for both the London Underground and the New York City Subway when they beat the New York Subway Challenge record in November 2013.

The record remained unbeaten for 17 months, until Marc Gawley from Denton, Greater Manchester, set a new time of 16 hours, 29 minutes and 57 seconds on 21 April 2011. As a fast marathon runner, he revealed that he did not use any buses on the day, preferring instead to make all his connections on foot. Gawley's record was beaten 37 days later, when James and Wilson completed the challenge in just 44 seconds under Gawley's time, setting a new record of 16 hours, 29 minutes and 13 seconds on 27 May 2011.

This record stood for over two years until August 2013, before being broken by previous record holder Geoff Marshall who along with Anthony Smith, completed the challenge in 16 hours, 20 minutes and 27 seconds, the record time was then published for the first time in seven years in the Guinness World Records in the 2015 edition.

Clive Burgess and Ronan McDonald set a new Guinness world record time of 16 hours, 14 minutes and 10 seconds on 21 February 2015. The record was broken later that year, on 21 May, by previous record holders Andi James and Steve Wilson, in a time of 15 hours, 45 minutes 38 seconds.

=== 272 stations ===
The total number of stations rose to 272 after the opening of Nine Elms and Battersea Power Station on the Northern line extension to Battersea.

Adham Fisher set a new Guinness World Record time of 20 hours, 4 minutes and 10 seconds on 4 October 2021.

Arthur Philipps, Ruairí O'Grady, John Mawdsley, Alex Rennie, Tim Livant, Joseph Solomon, Alex Sinclair, and Yipeng Xu set a new Guinness World Record time of 18 hours, 8 minutes, and 13 seconds on 23 October 2023. A new record was set on 10 August 2024 when Robin Otter and Thomas Sheat visited the 272 stations in 17 hours, 46 minutes and 48 seconds.

== Other attempts ==
Attempts to travel the network have been linked to charities such as Children in Need and Comic Relief. A charity attempt known as "Tube Relief" was organised, following the 7 July 2005 London bombings, to raise money for the London Bombings Relief Charitable Fund. Fifty-one people rode the entire tube network for the day, raising over £10,000 towards the official charity fund. A Sue Ryder charity event took place in November 2011, when ten teams competed against each other to have their photo taken outside as many of the 270 stations as possible. Former record holder Geoff Marshall subsequently organised a mass-participant events in 2014, 2015 and 2016, called "Walk The Tube", raising tens of thousands of pounds in the process.

== See also ==
- Subway Challenge, equivalent challenge on the New York City Subway
- Travelling salesman problem
