= Matthew Ahn =

American political candidate

Matthew Ahn is a lawyer, law professor, and Democratic politician from Ohio. Ahn grew up in North Royalton, Ohio and received a master's degree from the University of Minnesota and a J.D. from New York University School of Law. Ahn taught at Cuyahoga Community College before law school and served as a law clerk after law school. He unsuccessfully campaigned to become the prosecutor of Cuyahoga County, Ohio, in 2024. Ahn has also twice held the Guinness World Record for fastest time to travel to all New York City Subway stations, a feat commonly known as the Subway Challenge.

== Early life and education ==
Ahn grew up in North Royalton, Ohio, a western suburb of Cleveland, and entered Case Western Reserve University when he was thirteen years old. After graduating with degrees in music theory and chemistry, he received a master's degree in music composition from the University of Minnesota. He graduated with a J.D. from New York University School of Law, where he served as a senior executive editor of the New York University Law Review and studied under Bryan Stevenson, the founder of the Equal Justice Initiative.

== Career ==
Before law school, Ahn taught low-income and first-generation students at Cuyahoga Community College. After law school, Ahn served as a law clerk for Lawrence E. Kahn of the United States District Court for the Northern District of New York and for Jane Richards Roth of the United States Court of Appeals for the Third Circuit. He worked as a public defender in both state and federal court, and also as a special education lawyer. While working at the Federal Public Defender for the Northern District of Ohio during the height of the COVID-19 pandemic, his appeal in United States v. Jones was one of the first cases in the nation to expand the scope of federal compassionate release to include COVID-19.

Ahn was hired in 2021 to teach at Cleveland State University College of Law. In 2023, he was named Faculty Member of the Year by CSU Law's students.

He campaigned to become the prosecutor of Cuyahoga County, Ohio, in 2024, challenging Democratic incumbent Michael O'Malley in the March primary. While Ahn did not win, he garnered 40.67% of the vote, and his level of support within the Cuyahoga County Democratic Party was high enough to keep incumbent county prosecutor O'Malley from being endorsed by the party.

== World records and other pursuits ==
Ahn twice held the Guinness World Record for fastest time to travel to all New York City Subway stations, a feat commonly known as the Subway Challenge. The New York Times has dubbed him "King of the Subway".

A self-described "transit enthusiast", Ahn has created a replica of the New York City Subway map showing only stations which are wheelchair-accessible. It has been lauded for highlighting the relative paucity of such stations. In 2017, Ahn made MTA-related headlines again when he raced a subway train between the adjacent Chambers Street and Park Place stations on foot.

Ahn has also gained recognition as a YouTube musician for his mashup of the opening number from the hit musical Hamilton with the theme song to the movie Space Jam.

In 2015, Ahn published a widely read comprehensive ranking of every Cleveland Browns loss since 1999. He appeared as a contestant on Jeopardy! in 2013.
