= The Three Pyramids Club =

Studio album by Suggs
- Released: 7 September 1998
- Recorded: 1998
- Studios: The Church Studios; Swanyard Studios; Innovation Studios; IQ Studios (London)
- Genre: Ska/pop
- Length: 38:19
- Label: Warner Music
- Producer: Steve Lironi

Suggs chronology
| The Lone Ranger (1995) | The Three Pyramids Club (1998) | The Platinum Collection (2007) |

Professional ratings
Review scores
| Source | Rating |
|---|---|
| AllMusic | 4/5 stars |
| NME | 3/5 stars |

The Three Pyramids Club is the second solo studio album by the English singer Suggs known from ska and pop band Madness. It was released in 1998 and reached no. 82 on the UK Albums Chart in its lone week on the chart.

== Critical reception ==
NME rated the album 3/10, commenting that "the music swings drunkenly from the vaudeville cheesiness of "Straight Banana" to the rinky-dink cod-ragtime of "Our Man"." NME also compared Suggs's singing to that of a "Cockney karaoke king."

Evan Cater of AllMusic claimed the album was "far more ambitious" than Suggs' debut solo album, featuring "buoyantly energetic ska-pop". Cater was critical of "Suggs' regrettable predilection for cheesy female background singers and the eye-rolling stupidity of lyrics like "oh, girl, you got me in a whirl." Carter noted that the album was "more consistent than [Suggs's] debut." The review stated that the album was "[a] must-have for Madness collectors" and that "The Three Pyramids Club should also appeal to the new generation of ska fans."

== Track listing ==
All tracks are written by Graham McPherson and Steve Lironi, except where noted.

| No. | Title | Writer(s) | Length |
|---|---|---|---|
| 1. | "I Am" | McPherson, Nick Feldman | 4:06 |
| 2. | "So Tired" | | 4:34 |
| 3. | "Straight Banana" | | 4:07 |
| 4. | "Invisible Man" | McPherson, Mike Connaris, Boo Hewerdine | 3:18 |
| 5. | "Sing" | | 3:54 |
| 6. | "Girl" | | 3:40 |
| 7. | "The Greatest Show on Earth" | | 3:59 |
| 8. | "Our Man" | | 3:36 |
| 9. | "On Drifting Sand" | | 3:37 |
| 10. | "The Three Pyramids Club" | | 3:25 |

== Chart performance ==
| Chart (1998) | Peak position |
|---|---|
| UK Albums Chart | 82 |

== Personnel ==
- Suggs – vocals
- Steve Lironi – guitars, bass guitar, Jaguar & Hammond organs, piano, loops, vibes, theremin, programming, synthesiser, ARP Odyssey, backing vocals
- Jah Wobble – bass guitar
- Chris Barber – bass guitar, trombone
- Vic Pitt - double bass
- Ged Lynch – drums, percussion
- Guy Davies - organ
- Paul Sealey - banjo
- John Crocker - clarinet
- Andy Ross – saxophone
- Chris Margary – saxophone
- Vic Pitt – saxophone
- Rico Rodriguez – trombone
- Matt Coleman – trombone
- Dominic Glover – trumpet
- Kevin Robinson – trumpet
- Neil Yates – trumpet
- Pat Halcox – trumpet
- Nick Feldman – keyboards (1), backing vocals (9)
- Keith Summer – backing vocals (4, 8)
- Michael Flaherty – backing vocals (4, 8)
- Mike Connaris – backing vocals (4, 8)
- General Levy – vocals (6)
- Cutmaster Swift – scratching (8)
- Sarah Brown – backing vocals (3, 7, 10)
- Simon Gunning – backing vocals (9)
- Levine Andrade – violin (10)

Technical

- Steve Lironi – production, mixing
- James Young – engineering, mixing
