= Blue Day (Suggs song) =

Single by Suggs & Co. featuring the Chelsea Team
- Released: 1997
- Genre: Rock; pop
- Label: WEA
- Songwriter: Mike Connaris

Suggs singles chronology
"No More Alcohol" (1996)	"Blue Day" (1997)	"I Am" (1998)

Music video
- "Blue Day" on YouTube

"Blue Day" is a song written by Mike Connaris and was released as a single by the English singer Suggs, in collaboration with the players of football team Chelsea, in 1997 by WEA Records. It was made single of the week by NME and peaked at No. 22 on the UK singles chart.
