= Disappearing London =

- Starring: Suggs
- Country of origin: United Kingdom
- No. of series: 2
- No. of episodes: 12

Production
- Producer: Wavelength Films
- Running time: 23 mins

Original release
- Network: ITV London
- Release: 10 January 2006 – 13 February 2007

Related
- How London Was Built The Tube; Suggs' Survivors

Disappearing London is a British documentary television series that was broadcast on ITV London. In each episode, Madness frontman Suggs "searches out the people and places that give London its quirky appeal and charm, and discovers why they may not be around for much longer".

Overall, there have been 2 series of 6 episodes each. Each episode lasts approximately 23 minutes.

Both series were produced by Wavelength Films for ITV London, and series one was also produced in association with Sky Travel.

== Transmission dates ==
=== Series One ===
1. Tuesday 10 January 2006
2. Tuesday 17 January 2006
3. Tuesday 24 January 2006
4. Tuesday 31 January 2006
5. Tuesday 7 February 2006
6. Tuesday 14 February 2006

According to the series website, features included: Romford Dog Track – Going to the Dogs or the Cheetahs; Welsh in London – So much more than rugby; London's telephone boxes – a design classic; A proper London funeral; If you want to get ahead, get a hat; Italian café culture; The Victorian public loo; and Tooting Bec Lido.

=== Series Two ===
1. Tuesday 9 January 2007 – Churchill's secret wartime bunker; a prisoner-of-war camp in a Peckham park; and an old-fashioned grocers in North London.
2. Tuesday 16 January 2007 – A bespoke shoemaker's shop; an old-style barbershop, pie & mash; and Hampstead Observatory, a Victorian observatory on Hampstead Heath.
3. Tuesday 23 January 2007 – A London tram; pub skittles; an Art Deco bakery in Richmond; and an historic east end allotment.
4. Tuesday 30 January 2007 – London's only surviving windmill on Brixton Hill; boxing pubs; Tin Pan Alley; a vintage-style recording studio.
5. Tuesday 6 February 2007 – Horse-drawn London; a survivor from the days when motoring in London was actually fun; and discovers a unique Victorian theatre hidden in a former hospital.
6. Tuesday 13 February 2007 – A stylish 1930s shop in the city; London's oldest football stand; and duet with Roy Hudd on the stage of London's only surviving grand music hall.
