= Subway Challenge =

Navigating the New York City Subway system in the shortest time possible

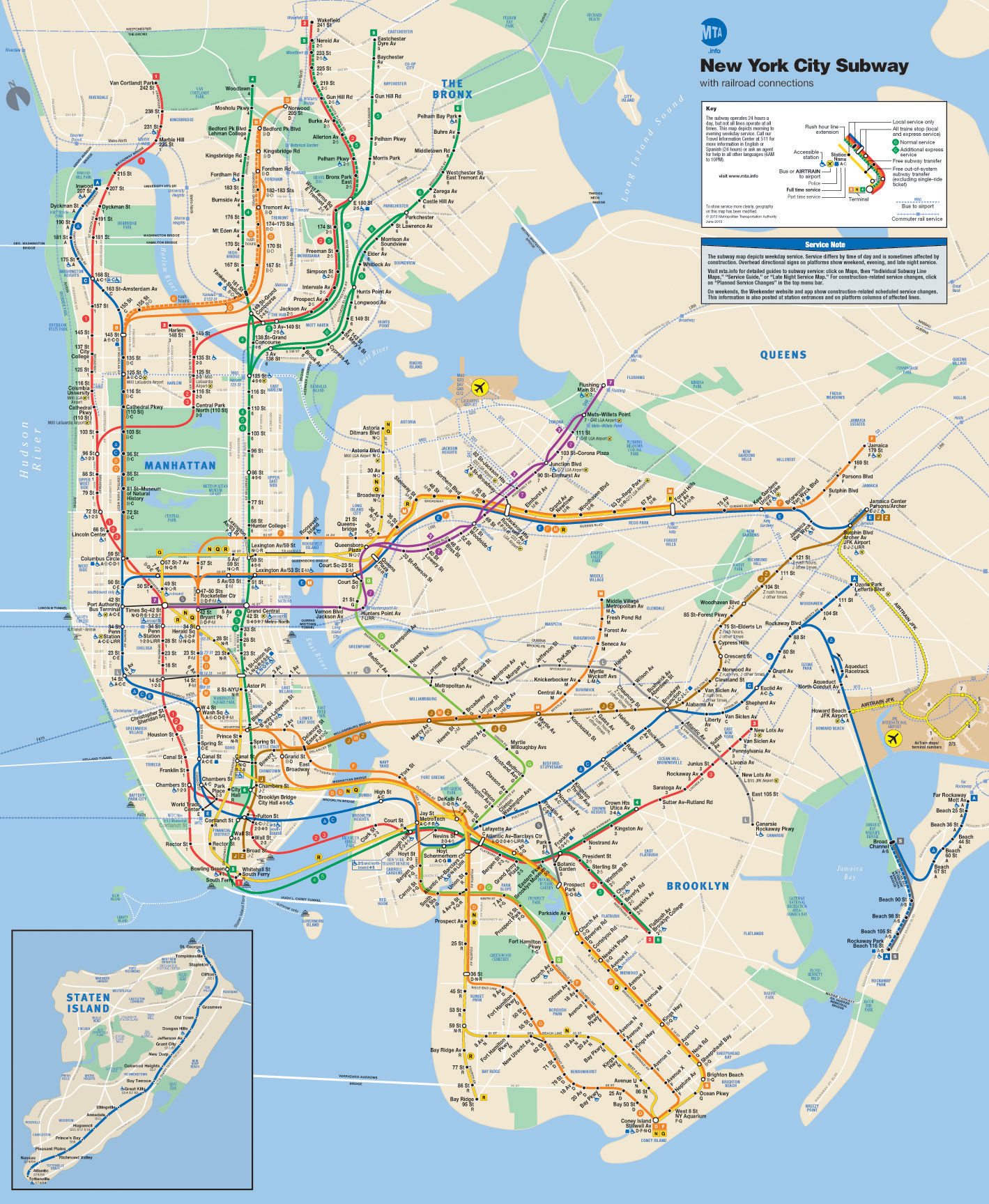
The official subway map from 2013. This is not the current map.

The Subway Challenge entails navigating the entire New York City Subway system in the shortest time possible. This ride is also known as the Rapid Transit Challenge and the Ultimate Ride. The challenge requires competitors to stop at all 472 stations; as of 2023, this record is held by Kate Jones of Switzerland. One competitor held the record for 469 stations, as he had competed before the January 2017 opening of the Second Avenue Subway. Three teams held the Guinness record for 468 stations, as they had competed prior to both the opening of the Second Avenue Subway and the September 2015 opening of the 7 Subway Extension, but after Dean Street station was closed in 1995. Records set before 1995 had a varying number of stations.

There are three primary variations of this challenge:

- Class A: Ride that requires a rider to traverse every line, but not necessarily the entire line.
- Class B: Full-system ride that requires a rider to stop at each station.
- Class C: Skip-stop ride that only requires a rider to pass through each station.

The three classes of rides (A, B and C) are defined by the Amateur New York Subway Riding Committee (ANYSRC), created by Peter Samson in 1966. In Class A, "the contestants making the run must traverse completely at least once each segment of right-of-way of the Transit Authority system. Each segment may be traversed either in one continuous transit or in any number of partial transits between stations on the segment." Guinness World Records recognizes what is essentially the Class B rules as the official world record. The only difference between the rides defined by Guinness and the ANYSRC is that per the ANYSRC, rides must be completed on a single fare, while the Guinness rules allow for transfers provided that they "be made by scheduled public transport or on foot."

== History ==
On May 30, 1940, two days before the separate subway systems of the Interborough Rapid Transit Company, Brooklyn–Manhattan Transit Corporation, and Independent Subway System were unified, Herman Rinke, an electric-railroad buff, became the first person to tour the entire system on a single 5-cent fare, doing it purely as a "sentimental gesture". Rinke rode the system for some 25 hours. Since then, more than 70 others – supposedly recorded in an unofficial file in the MTA Public Relations Department – rode the entire system. Kevin Foster held the Guinness World Record for the full-system ride for over 17 years. He set the mark of 26 hours, 21 minutes on October 25, 1989. Searching for a diversion while training to become the first person to bicycle the entire length of The Great Wall in China, Foster opened up the Guinness Book of World Records to find another challenge. He decided that to celebrate the 85th anniversary of the New York subway system he would spend 85 consecutive hours on the subway, during which time he broke the record for stopping at every station.

== Guinness Record times ==
Date	Record holder(s)	Stations	Time	Ref.
June 1, 1966	Michael Feldman and James Brown	491 (Note: Between the 1966 and 1988 records, half of the BMT Myrtle Avenue Line (9 stations), the IRT Third Avenue Line (14 stations), the BMT Culver Shuttle (3 stations), and part of the BMT Jamaica Line (5 stations) were closed. The Harlem–148th Street station, the Chrystie Street Connection (2 stations), and the Archer Avenue lines (3 stations) were opened. This resulted in a net loss of 25 stations.)	23 hours, 16 minutes	
August 3, 1967	Morgan Chu and six others	475	22 hours, 11½ minutes	
October 8, 1973	Mayer Wiesen and Charles Emerson	462	21 hours, 8½ minutes	
December 12/13, 1988	Rich Temple, Phil Vanner and Tom Murphy	466	29 hours, 47 minutes, 12 seconds	
October 25/26, 1989	Kevin Foster	466 (Note: The 63rd Street lines (3 stations) were opened on 29 October 1989, giving 469 stations. Dean Street was closed on 10 September 1995, giving 468 stations.)	26 hours, 21 minutes, 8 seconds	
December 28/29, 2006	Stefan Karpinski, Bill Amarosa Jr., Michael Boyle, Brian Brockmeyer, Jason Laska and Andrew Weir	468	24 hours, 54 minutes, 3 seconds	
January 22/23, 2009	Matt Ferrisi and Chris Solarz	468	22 hours, 52 minutes, 36 seconds	
November 18/19, 2013	Andi James, Steve Wilson, Martin Hazel, Peter Smyth, Glen Bryant and Adham Fisher	468	22 hours, 26 minutes, 02 seconds	
January 16, 2015	Matthew Ahn	468 (Note: Between 2015 and the next record in 2016, the 34th Street–Hudson Yards station was opened.)	21 hours, 49 minutes, 35 seconds	
July 22, 2016	Matthew Ahn	469	21 hours, 28 minutes, 14 seconds	
April 17, 2023	Kate Jones	472	22 hours, 14 minutes, 10 seconds	

There are 472 stations in the system (which must all be visited for the Class B record) and 423 multi-station complexes (necessary for the Class C record), on 25 routes. Challengers cover 662 miles of track in passenger service, while only being able to go to the toilet at 80 of the stations. Only the current record-holder, Kate Jones, has held the record with all 472 stations, as all previous official records are from before January 2017, when the Second Avenue Subway opened. One record holder has the record for the 469 stations, with all prior records back to 1973 being set with 468 or fewer stations.

The Amateur New York Subway Riding Committee mandates that rides must be completed on a single fare. The Guinness record rules allow a rider to exit and re-enter the system during the course of the run, and contestants may walk or take "scheduled public transport" between stations. According to the Guinness rules, "the use of private motor vehicles, taxis or any other form of privately arranged transport (bicycles, skateboards, etc.) is not allowed." Matthew Ahn's attempts, for instance, use the out-of-system transfers allowed under the Guinness rules. The complete Guinness rules can be found on the Rapid Transit Challenge website and are similar to the rules for the London Underground's Tube Challenge.

The Amateur New York Subway Riding Committee is not an official body and does not validate any record attempts, nor does the Metropolitan Transportation Authority.

=== 468 stations ===
On August 23–24, 2006, Donald Badaczewski and Matt Green made a run setting the skip-stop record. During their run, a Class C attempt as defined by the Amateur New York Subway Riding Committee, they were required to pass through, but not necessarily stop at, each station. Thus they utilized express trains where possible to save time. They did this on a single fare, not exiting the system until the completion of the race. They posted a time of 24 hours, 2 minutes, breaking the previous Class C record of 25 hours, 11 minutes for this feat set in 1998 by Salvatore Babones and Mike Falsetta. Metro broke the story of this Class C record. An AM New York article suggested that the news environment at the time created a perfect opening for such a lighthearted story. Pundits frequently questioned the pair on how they had relieved themselves during their journey. The two invariably answered that they had "held it" or "toughed it out," despite the fact that "it was tough."

On December 28–29, 2006, a Class B attempt was made by former classmates from Regis High School in Manhattan, representing all five boroughs of New York City, with a sixth member from New Jersey. In the press they were nicknamed "The Subway Six": Bill Amarosa was a lifelong railfan and had discussed a record attempt while they were in high school, but it was a conversation at their 10-year reunion on June 17, 2006, that sparked planning for the attempt. From conception to execution, the record attempt took six months. Guinness World Records confirmed the record five months afterward and sent the team their official record certificate after nine months.

On January 22, 2010, Matt Ferrisi and Chris Solarz set a new record with an official time of 22:52:36, confirmed by Guinness World Records on September 17, 2010.

On November 18–19, 2013, the record was beaten by a team of six Britons, including Glen Bryant from Emsworth, with a new time of 22 hours, 26 minutes, and 2 seconds. The competitors used an unusual route, achieving a time 26 minutes shorter than the former record, as confirmed by Guinness World Records on May 30, 2014. Three members of the British team were former record holders for the Tube Challenge, and thus became the first people to achieve the feat on both sides of the Atlantic Ocean.

On January 19, 2015, a new record of 21 hours, 49 minutes and 35 seconds, was set by Matthew Ahn, taking the 468-station record. He began his trip at Far Rockaway–Mott Avenue and finished at Flushing–Main Street, both in Queens.

=== 469 stations ===
After the 7 Subway Extension opened in September 2015, Ahn's previous record was invalidated. On July 23, 2016, he completed another such trip, and despite the addition of one station, he beat his previous record while completing the new 469-station challenge. This record was officially validated by Guinness World Records on August 26, 2016. He began his trip at Rockaway Park–Beach 116th Street in Queens and finished at Flushing–Main Street.

=== 472 stations ===
After the Second Avenue Subway opened in January 2017, Ahn's previous record was once again invalidated, and the record sat unclaimed for over six years. On April 17, 2023, Kate Jones traveled through all 472 stations, including the Second Avenue Subway stops, in 22 hours, 14 minutes, and 10 seconds. She was the first woman to set the record. Guinness World Records confirmed Jones's record in mid-May 2023.

== In popular culture ==
A 2004 Class B attempt to traverse the system was documented in a short film entitled New Lots.

A 2003 Class B attempt was the main topic of a Discovery Times Channel documentary on the subway.

== Other systems ==
The corresponding record for the London Underground (Tube Challenge) has had many holders since 1960. London and New York have always been the most notable systems for this record. Between 1967 and 1992, records for a few other subway networks were considered, attempted and appeared in the Guinness Books. Since 1993, only the London Underground record has been published with decreasing regularity, and Guinness only considered London and New York for this record category. However, since 2011, other systems have been considered again.

The first other network to be granted a record was the Paris Métro; Alan Paul Jenkins achieved a time of 11 hours and 13 minutes for travelling to 270 stations (with 7 closed) on August 30, 1967. The next record was set on 13 August 2011 by Adham Fisher, who visited 300 stations in 13 hours, 37 minutes and 54 seconds.

The Berlin U-Bahn had its first record set on May 2, 2014, by Michael Wurm, Henning Colsman-Freyberger, Rudolf von Grot and Oliver Ziemek. They visited the 173 stations in 7 hours, 33 minutes and 15 seconds. This was beaten by Adham Fisher on May 26, 2017, with a new time of 6 hours, 53 minutes and 24 seconds.

The first official record set and recognized by Guinness on the Delhi Metro was on August 29, 2021, by Prafull Singh, a Revenue Inspector for Delhi Metro Rail Corporation, covering 254 stations in 16 hours, 2 minutes and 17 seconds. Although this record was beaten earlier by Delhiite Shashank Manu on April 14, 2021 with a time of 15 hours, 22 minutes 49 seconds covering all 286 stations, it was not recognized by Guinness as a result of a mix up until June 25, 2023.

The first Guinness record of a speedrun on San Francisco's Bay Area Rapid Transit (BART) system was created by a group of UC Berkeley graduate students on March 9, 2024, covering its 50 stations in 5 hours, 47 minutes, and 42 seconds. BART recognizes a faster time of 5 hours and 9 minutes completed in October 2024, but the record was never submitted to Guinness.

== See also ==
- New York City Subway stations
- History of the New York City Subway
- Tube Challenge, a similar challenge in London
- Travelling salesman problem, a computational problem where the goal is to find the shortest route that runs through all points in a collection
