= Cecilia (Simon & Garfunkel song) =

1970 single by Simon & Garfunkel

- Artwork for US, French, and Norwegian vinyl releases featuring Simon, Garfunkel, and co-producer Roy Halee

Single by Simon & Garfunkel

from the album Bridge over Troubled Water
- B-side: "The Only Living Boy in New York"
- Released: April 20, 1970
- Recorded: November 2, 1969
- Genre: Pop rock; folk rock
- Length: 2:54; 2:38 (7-inch version)
- Label: Columbia
- Songwriter: Paul Simon
- Producers: Roy Halee; Paul Simon; Art Garfunkel

Simon & Garfunkel singles chronology
"Bridge over Troubled Water" (1970)	"Cecilia" (1970)	"El Cóndor Pasa (If I Could)" (1970)

Official audio
- "Cecilia" on YouTube

"Cecilia" is a song by American musical duo Simon & Garfunkel. It was released in April 1970 as the third single from the duo's fifth and final studio album, Bridge over Troubled Water (1970). Written by Paul Simon, the song's origins lie in a late-night party, in which the duo and friends began banging on a piano bench. They recorded the sound with a tape recorder, employing reverb and matching the rhythm created by the machine. Simon later wrote the song's guitar line and lyrics on the subject of an untrustworthy lover.

"Cecilia" was a hit single in the United States, peaking at number four on the Billboard Hot 100. On the Cash Box Top 100, it reached number one. The song also performed well in several other countries but failed to chart in the United Kingdom, where it was released as a single about six months after the album. It has been the subject of numerous cover versions, including those by American duo Times Two and English singer Suggs, which became chart hits in numerous regions.

== Background and recording ==
The song's origins lie in a late-night party attended by the duo and friends. The song's rhythm was developed by Simon, Garfunkel, and Simon's younger brother, Eddie. They recorded it for fun, utilizing a Sony tape recorder and employing reverberation. In doing so, they were able to synchronize their live rhythm with the reverberating sound on the recording. A friend grabbed a guitar, strumming and punctuating the rhythm with "aahs".

Simon later found himself coming back to the tape and its infectious quality. While listening to the recording, he composed the song's guitar line. Simon found a section, the length of shortly over a minute, that he felt had a nice groove. He and producer Roy Halee made a loop of this section, which was not an easy task before the advent of digital recording. The duo later recorded additional elements of the song at Columbia Records' Gower Street location in Hollywood, typically used for string section recording. Simon & Garfunkel dropped drumsticks on the parquet floor, incorporating their sound into the track. In addition, Simon played random notes on a xylophone, as those elements would be compressed in the final version to where it would not be audible whether or not they were correctly played. Drums were played by veteran Wrecking Crew drummer Hal Blaine.

The lyric "making love in the afternoon" was among Simon's most explicit at the time. Simon states in the 2011 documentary The Harmony Game that, during the song's initial success, he encountered a recently returned Vietnam War veteran who told him that soldiers heard the song and found it a sign of the country's changing morals.

In 2008, Stephen Colbert facetiously asked Simon why the narrator of the song would need to get up and wash his face after making love. Simon replied, "Well, it's the '60s, so I can't remember."

In 2023, during an interview on the Howard Stern Show, Simon mentioned that the opening of the song was not recorded on drums, but was actually three or four people hitting guitar cases near a Nagra tape recorder over 8–9 minutes, which gave off the slapback.

== Composition ==
Simon has suggested that the "Cecilia" of the title refers to St. Cecilia, patron saint of music in the Catholic tradition, and thus the song might refer to the frustration of fleeting inspiration in songwriting, the vagaries of musical fame or in a wider sense the absurdity of pop culture. The song is generally interpreted as a lament over a capricious lover who causes both anguish and jubilation to the singer. St. Cecilia is mentioned in another Paul Simon song, "The Coast" (from his 1990 album The Rhythm of the Saints): "A family of musicians took shelter for the night in the little harbor church of St. Cecilia."

== Release and charts ==
Simon & Garfunkel initially imagined "Cecilia" to be the first real single from Bridge over Troubled Water, following an early release of "The Boxer" in April 1969. Columbia Records chairman Clive Davis pressed the duo to instead issue the title track as the lead single.

Cash Box described "Cecilia" as a "mixture of rhythm-chant vigor and Caribbean-rock excitement". Record World called it a "Calypso type tune [that] will make [Simon & Garfunkel] more friends." Billboard said that "everything about it is absolutely perfect."

The song topped the Cash Box Top 100 in May 1970. The song peaked at number 4 on the Billboard Hot 100, spending 13 weeks on the chart. It also hit number 32 on the magazine's Easy Listening chart.

The single did not chart in the UK, despite being released as the follow-up to Simon and Garfunkel's number 1 hit "Bridge over Troubled Water", and most copies of the UK single misspelled the title as "Cecelia" on the label.

=== Charts ===
==== Weekly charts ====
Chart (1970)	Peak position
Argentina (Escalera a la fama)	1
Australia (Kent Music Report)	6
Austria (Ö3 Austria Top 40)	6
Belgium (Ultratop 50 Flanders)	3
Belgium (Ultratop 50 Wallonia)	9
Canada Top Singles (RPM)	2
Finland (Suomen virallinen lista)	21
Netherlands (Dutch Top 40)	2
Netherlands (Single Top 100)	1
Rhodesia (ZIMA)	19
Spain (IFPI Spain)	2
Switzerland (Schweizer Hitparade)	3
US Billboard Hot 100	4
US Easy Listening (Billboard)	31
US Cash Box Top 100	1
West Germany (GfK)	2

==== Year-end charts ====
Chart (1970)	Position
Australia (Kent Music Report)	41
Austria (Ö3 Austria Top 40)	19
Belgium (Ultratop 50 Flanders)	34
Canada Top Singles (RPM)	37
Netherlands (Single Top 100)	26
US Billboard Hot 100	49
US Cash Box Top 100	51
West Germany (Musikmarkt)	7

== Certifications ==
Region	Certification	Certified units/sales
New Zealand (RMNZ)	2× Platinum	60,000^{‡}
United Kingdom (BPI)	Platinum	600,000^{‡}
United States (RIAA)	Gold	1,000,000^{^}
^{^} Shipments figures based on certification alone.^{‡} Sales+streaming figures based on certification alone.

== Sweet Henry version ==
"Cecilia"

Single by Sweet Henry
- A-side: "Cecilia"
- B-side: "Oh! Reba"
- Released: February 1970
- Length: 2:26
- Label: Paramount PAA-0018
- Songwriter: Paul Simon
- Producer: Tim O'Brien

Sweet Henry singles chronology
"Cecilia" (1970)	"Any Old Time You're Lonely and Sad" (1970)

=== Background ===
A cover version by Canadian band Sweet Henry was released in February 1970, before Simon and Garfunkel's version. It was produced by Tim O'Brien. The B-side, "O'Reba!", was written by O'Brien and Gary St. Clair.

The single, which was released two months before Simon and Garfunkel's version, was reported to have initially sold well, particularly in Manitoba, Saskatchewan, Ontario and Ontario. However, Simon and Garfunkel's version quickly outsold Sweet Henry's recording outside of Canada.

=== Reception ===
The record was given a four-star rating in Record World magazine, with the reviewer describing it as "a lovely version of the Paul Simon song" with "a good sound." Billboard called it "potent debut material for the smooth blended group ... that should be established in the charts quickly." Cash Box described the record as "Standout teen material done in a tempting performance".

=== Local music charts ===
In June 1970 the Sweet Henry and Simon & Garfunkel versions shared the No. 1 position in Winnipeg. The single peaked at No. 1 in Kingston and No. 22 in Hamilton, Ontario. It also charted in Wilkes-Barre, Pennsylvania, San Jose, California, and Cypress Gardens and Jacksonville, Florida. For the week of 21 March, the single reached No. 7 in the Record World One Stop chart for Dearborn, Michigan.

=== National singles charts ===
The record made its Canadian national debut at No. 79 in the RPM Weekly RPM100 chart for the week of 16 May 1970, and peaked at No. 46 for the week of 20 June.

== Times Two version ==
"Cecilia"

Single by Times Two

from the album X2
- B-side: "Romeo"
- Released: 1988
- Length: 3:46
- Label: Reprise
- Songwriter: Paul Simon
- Producers: Jay King; David Agent; Benny Medina

Times Two singles chronology
"Strange but True" (1988)	"Cecilia" (1988)	"Set Me Free" (1990)

In 1988, a cover version by California-based dance duo Times Two was released, peaking at number 79 on the US Billboard Hot 100 and number one in New Zealand.

=== Charts ===
==== Weekly charts ====
Chart (1988)	Peak position
New Zealand (Recorded Music NZ)	1
US Billboard Hot 100	79

==== Year-end charts ====
Chart (1988)	Position
New Zealand (RIANZ)	8

== Suggs version ==
"Cecilia"

Single by Suggs featuring Louchie Lou & Michie One

from the album The Lone Ranger
- Released: April 1, 1996
- Genre: Reggae
- Length: 3:08
- Label: WEA
- Songwriter: Paul Simon
- Producer: Sly & Robbie

Suggs singles chronology
"The Tune" (1995)	"Cecilia" (1996)	"No More Alcohol" (1996)

In 1994, English singer Suggs went to work on his first solo project with producers Sly and Robbie, who suggested "Cecilia" as one of the songs to work on. Sly and Robbie had previously worked with the English ragga duo Louchie Lou & Michie One on "Shout", and they brought the duo in on the recording. "Cecilia" appears on Suggs' debut solo album, The Lone Ranger released in 1995, and the song was released in April 1996 as the fourth single from the album. The song became the most successful single for both Suggs and Louchie Lou & Michie One, reaching number four on the UK Singles Chart.

=== Charts ===
==== Weekly charts ====
Chart (1996)	Peak position
Austria (Ö3 Austria Top 40)	28
Czech Republic (IFPI CR)	3
Europe (Eurochart Hot 100)	18
Iceland (Íslenski Listinn Topp 40)	26
Ireland (IRMA)	10
Israel (Israeli Singles Chart)	17
New Zealand (Recorded Music NZ)	44
Scottish Singles Sales (Official Charts)	2
UK Singles (Official Charts)	4

==== Year-end charts ====
Chart (1996)	Position
UK Singles (OCC)	32

=== Certifications ===
Region	Certification	Certified units/sales
United Kingdom (BPI)	Silver	200,000^{^}
^{^} Shipments figures based on certification alone.
