= Kate Jones (comedian) =

American comedian

Kate Jones is a comedian, writer, wedding officiant, performer, and a Guinness World Record holder for the Subway Challenge – the fastest trip through the New York City Subway – as of May 2023. Jones studied Naval Architecture and Marine Engineering at Webb Institute during her undergraduate years. She also shared the Guinness World Record for fastest time completing all NYC ferry stops with Rob Neill and Jesse Braver. She is a founding member of the London Neo-futurist group Degenerate Fox with Desiree Burch and the voice of Michelle Nguyen on the podcast Welcome to Night Vale.

== Early life ==
Jones is from New Jersey and is Vietnamese American. She was raised by her mother, her dad, and her other dad. As of 2023, she lives in Switzerland with her dog.

== Career ==
Jones is a comedian and stage performer who performed with the New York Neo Futurist theater. Jones and Burch were members of the Neo-Futurist group in New York City. They both moved to London after touring with the New York Neo-Futurists, and decided to start their own UK branch. Jones has since moved to Switzerland but Degenerate Fox continues.

She is the voice of Michelle Nguyen on Welcome to Night Vale, a popular narrative podcast. She has performed on several tours with Welcome to Night Vale and emceed. "Emceeing for Night Vale is such a wonderful experience because the audience is so loving and so excited to see someone they know from the Night Vale world. I was cast as Michelle in 2014, so it's been eight years that they've known my voice. And as they love to tell me, they fall asleep to me, which is weird, cuz I'm a comedian — but it's fine. Do whatever you need to sleep! I think it's a really special audience. They're very loving and giving and they wanna have a good time."

She performed with the Neo-Futurists in Too Much Light Makes the Baby Go Blind at the 2014 Edinburgh Fringe Festival. She has been on The Big Quiz Thing and Nickelodeon.

She is a writer and has written for McSweeneys. She once had a comedic tweet featured in a subway.

Jones is also an amateur poker player.

== Subway Challenge ==
In May 2023, Jones completed the Subway Challenge and set the Guinness World Record for visiting all New York City Subway stops in the fastest time. She was the first person to set this record with the inclusion of the Second Avenue Subway stations "'It was one of the longest commutes of my life,' Jones joked while appearing on NY1's Mornings On 1 with Pat Kiernan on Friday, May 19." She completed every stop in 22:14:10 on her 4th attempt in April 2023 hitting all 472 stations across 665 miles of track and was certified in May 2023. She is the first woman to hold the record in 50 years and the first person to complete the challenge since new subway stops were added. Beginning at the Far Rockaway–Mott Avenue station and ending her journey on the 7 train in Queens, Jones beat the previous record with only 50 seconds to spare.
