= Times Two =

American musical duo (1988–1991)

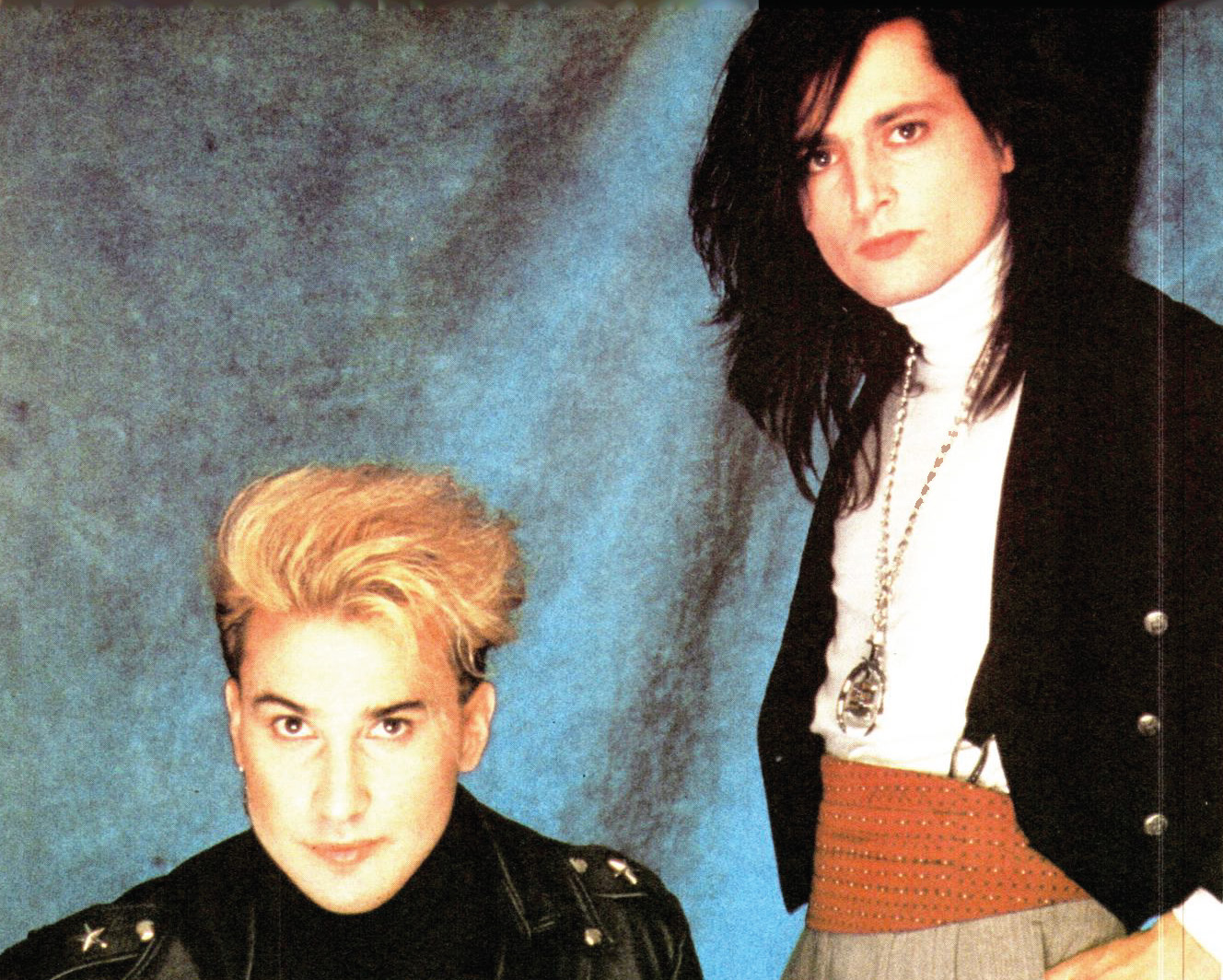
- Times Two c. 1988

Background information
- Also known as: Times 2, X2
- Origin: Point Reyes, California
- Genre: Dance-pop
- Years active: 1988–1991
- Labels: Reprise, EMI
- Past members: Shanti Jones; Johnny Dollar

Times Two was an American male musical duo composed of vocalists and keyboardists Shanti Jones and Johnny Dollar, both from Point Reyes, California. They wrote most of their own material and either produced or co-produced it as well.

== History ==
They debuted in 1988 with their Warner Bros./Reprise album X2, which reached No. 137 on the Billboard 200. In the U.S., their biggest hit was "Strange But True," which peaked at No. 21 on the Billboard Hot 100.

That year, Debbie Gibson's manager, Douglas Breitbart, signed Times Two as the opening act for her Out of the Blue Tour.

Their second U.S. single, "Cecilia" (a cover of Simon & Garfunkel's hit, featuring contributions from Paul Simon himself and produced by Club Nouveau's Jay King), was far less successful, reaching only No. 79 on the Billboard Hot 100. However, the song topped the charts in New Zealand for three weeks in 1988 and spent a total of 14 weeks on the chart. The album X2 reached No. 13 in New Zealand, buoyed by the success of the single, and spent 11 weeks on the chart.

Poor sales figures eventually led to the duo being dropped by Warner/Reprise. However, they resurfaced in 1990 on EMI Records with the EP Danger Is My Business. A cassingle and 12" were released for the track "Set Me Free", which peaked at No. 97 on the Billboard Hot R&B Singles chart. The track "Jack the Jill" prominently featured samples from Blue Swede's 1974 cover of B. J. Thomas's 1969 hit song "Hooked on a Feeling."

The EP was initially intended to serve as a teaser for their next full-length album, Hi-Fi & Mighty. A limited number of promotional copies of the album were distributed, which included the tracks from the previous EP, some new songs, and a few remixes. However, problems with management led to the cancellation of its commercial release, and the album was shelved. Soon afterward, Times Two disbanded.

== Post-breakup ==
Shanti Jones fronted a band called Sex & Reverb, which has produced several CDs.

Johnny Dollar subsequently performed under the name Giovanni Di Morente and played with El Radio Fantastique in the San Francisco Bay Area.

In 2021, a user named Carl92 posted a 17-second song snippet to WatZatSong. Since its posting, the snippet has acquired the unofficial name "Everyone Knows That (Ulterior Motives)" and has sparked a Reddit community dedicated to finding the full song. Various musicians, bands, and DJs have been contacted, including members of Times Two. People have noted similarities between the snippet's vocalist and Johnny Dollar, who was known for trading vocals with primary vocalist Shanti Jones.

However, on Sunday, April 28th, it was discovered that the song was recorded by Christopher Saint Booth and Philip Adrian Booth and featured in the pornographic film Angels of Passion. This discovery ruled out Times Two as the artist behind the song.

== Discography ==
=== Studio albums ===
- X2 (1988)
- Hi-Fi & Mighty (1990) (only released in certain countries)

=== Extended plays ===
- Danger Is My Business (1990)

=== Singles ===
- "Strange but True" (1988) peaked #21 on U.S. Billboard Hot 100, and #12 on the US Dance chart.
- "Cecilia" (1989) peaked at #79 on U.S. Billboard Hot 100
- "Set Me Free" (1990)
