= Louchie Lou & Michie One =

British female ragga/soul duo (active 1993–2000)

- Origin: London, England
- Genres: Ragga; soul
- Years active: 1993–present
- Labels: FFRR Records; China Records; Indochina Records
- Past members: Louise Gold (Louchie Lou); Michelle Charles (Michie One)

Louchie Lou & Michie One are a British female ragga/soul duo from London, best known for the single "Shout (It Out)", plus their collaboration with Suggs on the single "Cecilia", both of which reached the top 10 of the UK Singles Chart.

== Career ==
Louchie Lou (Louise Gold) and Michie One (Michelle Charles) met in 1991 at a Rebel MC gig. In 1993, they released their debut single, "Rich Girl", which samples the showtune "If I Were a Rich Man" from the musical Fiddler on the Roof. Later that year they had their first chart hit with "Shout (It Out)", which reached number 7 in the UK Singles Chart. It was a mash-up of the 1964 Lulu hit, originally recorded by The Isley Brothers, together with Henry Mancini's Peter Gunn theme, as performed by The Art of Noise and Duane Eddy (a hit in 1986).

For their 1995 album debut, II B Free, Louchie Lou & Michie One collaborated with Sly and Robbie, and Quincy Jones' son QDIII. The album was released in October 1995 and features the singles "Shout (It Out)", "Somebody Else's Guy (Me Did Love You)", "Champagne & Wine", "Secret Fantasy", "Get Down on It", "Free" and "Good Sweet Lovin'", which were all released between 1993 and 1996. International tours in Japan and the Far East, along with a headline engagement at Japansplash festival, brought visibility to Asian audiences.

Their second album, Danger-Us, released in the summer of 1996, features the single "The Honeymoon Is Over" as well as a cover version of the Brazilian hit "Crickets Sing for Anamaria" and the title track, "Dangerous", which was later featured on a 2001 episode of Nash Bridges. That same year they were featured as vocalists on Suggs' top 10 hit "Cecilia", and his top 40 hit "No More Alcohol". Danger-Us again featured QDIII and Sly and Robbie, with additional production work by Jazzwad (Buju Banton, Shabba Ranks) and Buzz Productions (Maxi Priest, Barrington Levy).

The duo have since released various compilation albums, including 7 Years of Plenty.

Michie One released a solo album entitled Power of One, although this was not issued in the UK. She is currently working on further solo material, and featuring her vocals on dance music tracks.

In 2004, Gwen Stefani remade "Rich Girl" for her single of the same name. In 2022, Puerto Rican singer Ozuna sampled Louchie Lou & Michie One's track for his song "Somos Iguales".

== Discography ==
=== Studio albums ===
Release date	Information	UK
4 September 1995	II B Free Track listing: 1. Shout (It Out) – 3:32; 2. Champagne & Wine – 3:56; 3. Free – 5:12; 4. Good Sweet Lovin' – 4:18; 5. Secret Fantasy – 4:17; 6. Somebody Else's Guy (Me Did Love Ya) – 3:11; 7. Passion – 4:53; 8. I Know A Place – 4:26; 9. Cheribiyeh – 4:22; 10. Get Down on It – 3:44; 11. Free (Jazzwad Mix) – 5:48; 12. Secret Fantasy (Dancehall Mix) – 4:17; 13. Get Down on It (Flipside Mix) – 4:03	—
23 June 1997	Danger-Us Track listing: 1. Dangerous – 4:43; 2. Party Party – 4:45; 3. I Knew It I Blew It – 4:06; 4. The Honeymoon Is Over – 3:48; 5. The Crickets Sing For Ana Maria – 4:01; 6. You'll Never Know (How You Got Me Feelin') – 4:29; 7. Feel the Vibes (In The Air) – 4:11; 8. Kingman – 3:41; 9. Translantic Lover – 4:04; 10. Baby I'm Gonna Get You – 4:03; 11. Before the Night Is Over – 3:44	—

=== Compilation albums ===
Release date	Information	UK
8 July 1996	Remix! Remix! Remix! Track listing: 1. Champagne & Wine (Single Mix) – 3:58; 2. Champagne & Wine (Dub Mix) – 4:14; 3. Secret Fantasy (The Beatmasters 7" Mix) – 3:59; 4. Secret Fantasy (Sly & Robbie Mix) – 4:17; 5. Secret Fantasy (Sly & Robbie Dub Mix) – 4:13; 6. Secret Fantasy (Mafia & Fluxy Hip Hop Mix) – 4:22; 7. Free (Baby Sean Mix) – 7:00; 8. Free (QD III 7"Mix) – 4:33; 9. Free (QD III Freestyle Mix) – 5:00; 10. Free (Jazzwad Dub Mix) – 5:47	—
22 October 2001	7 Years of Plenty Track listing: 1. Dynamite; 2. 10 Out of 10; 3. Dangerous; 4. Hot Stuff; 5. Body Rock; 6. Goody Goody Love; 7. I Don't Think So; 8. Good Sweet Lovin'; 9. All Around The World; 10. Outcast; 11. Keep Looking at Me; 12. Perfect High; 13. Powers	—

=== Singles ===
==== As lead artist ====
Release date	Single	UK	Album
17 May 1993	"Shout (It Out)"	7	II B Free
2 August 1993	"Somebody Else's Guy"	54	II B Free
18 October 1993	"Rich Girl"	—	Non-album single
7 November 1994	"Champagne & Wine"	120	II B Free
6 March 1995	"Secret Fantasy"	84	II B Free
14 August 1995	"Get Down on It"	58	II B Free
9 October 1995	"Free"	93	II B Free
3 June 1996	"Good Sweet Lovin'"	34	II B Free
16 September 1996	"Free" (reissue)	97	II B Free
19 May 1997	"The Honeymoon Is Over"	87	Danger-Us
19 October 1998	"Don't Stand So Close to Me"	—	Non-album single
13 September 1999	"Body Rock"	—	7 Years of Plenty
16 October 2000	"10 Out of 10"	—	7 Years of Plenty
28 April 2017	"Priceless" (featuring Ding Dong & Bravo)	—	Non-album single

==== As featured artist ====
Release date	Single	UK	Album
1 April 1996	"Cecilia" (Suggs feat. Louchie Lou & Michie One)	4	The Lone Ranger
9 September 1996	"No More Alcohol" (Suggs feat. Louchie Lou & Michie One)	24	The Lone Ranger
1996	"Empty Eyes" (Jack Radics feat. Louchie Lou & Michie One)	-	Affairs of the Heart
1997	"Sisteren" (Sayoko feat. Louchie Lou & Michie One)	-	MIX UP
2018	"Area Code" (Dreadzone feat. Louchie Lou & Michie One)	-	Dread Times
2022	"Double Six Domino" (Miss Fritty feat. Louchie Lou & Michie One)	-	Gangsta Lady
