= Kid Kapichi =

English rock band

- Origin: Hastings, East Sussex, England
- Genre: Punk rock
- Years active: 2013–present
- Label: Spinefarm
- Members: Jack Wilson; Eddie Lewis
- Past members: Ben Beetham; George Macdonald
- Website: www.kidkapichi.com

Kid Kapichi are an English punk rock band formed in Hastings in 2013. The band consists of vocalist and guitarist Jack Wilson and bassist Eddie Lewis.

== History ==
In 2013, Jack Wilson and Ben Beetham began writing music together. After they finished their first song, "Ice Cream," their friends from school, Eddie Lewis (bass) and George MacDonald (drums), joined the band and played their first concerts in Hastings. In the following years, the band released several singles and EPs before touring Europe in 2019, first at the Reading and Leeds Festivals and then as support for Frank Carter & The Rattlesnakes. On February 5, 2021, the band self-released their debut album, This Time Next Year. On 26 March 2022, the band opened for Liam Gallagher at London's Royal Albert Hall. Gallagher personally invited the band after hearing their song "New England", praising it on Twitter.

In June 2022, Kid Kapichi were signed by Spinefarm Records. On 23 September 2022, they released their second studio album, Here's What You Could Have Won, which features Bob Vylan's song "New England". The album entered the UK Albums Chart at number 38.

In fall 2023, they toured North America, supporting Nothing but Thieves. Their third studio album, There Goes the Neighbourhood, was released on 15 March 2024. The song "Zombie Nation" features Suggs as a guest singer. The album peaked at 90th on the UK Albums Chart. The album release was followed by a headlining tour through Europe. On 5 May 2025 it was announced that Ben and George had left the band.

== Style ==
James Wilkinson of AllMusic described Kid Kapichi as a "rough, establishment-challenging quartet inspired by U.S. alt rock while staying true to their British indie punk roots". Singer Jack Wilson cited bands such as the Arctic Monkeys, The Libertines, Queens of the Stone Age, and Soft Play as their primary influences. Wilson's vocals have also been compared to those of Mike Skinner and Liam Gallagher.

== Discography ==
=== Albums ===
- This Time Next Year (2021)
- Here's What You Could Have Won (2022)
- There Goes the Neighborhood (2024)
- Fearless Nature (2026)

=== EPs ===
- Kid Kapichi (2017)
- Lucozade Dreams (2018)
- Sugar Tax (2019)

== Awards and nominations ==
Award Ceremony	Year	Work	Category	Result
Berlin Music Video Awards	2023	Smash the Gaff	Best Narrative	Nominated
