= Suggs =

British musician (born 1961)

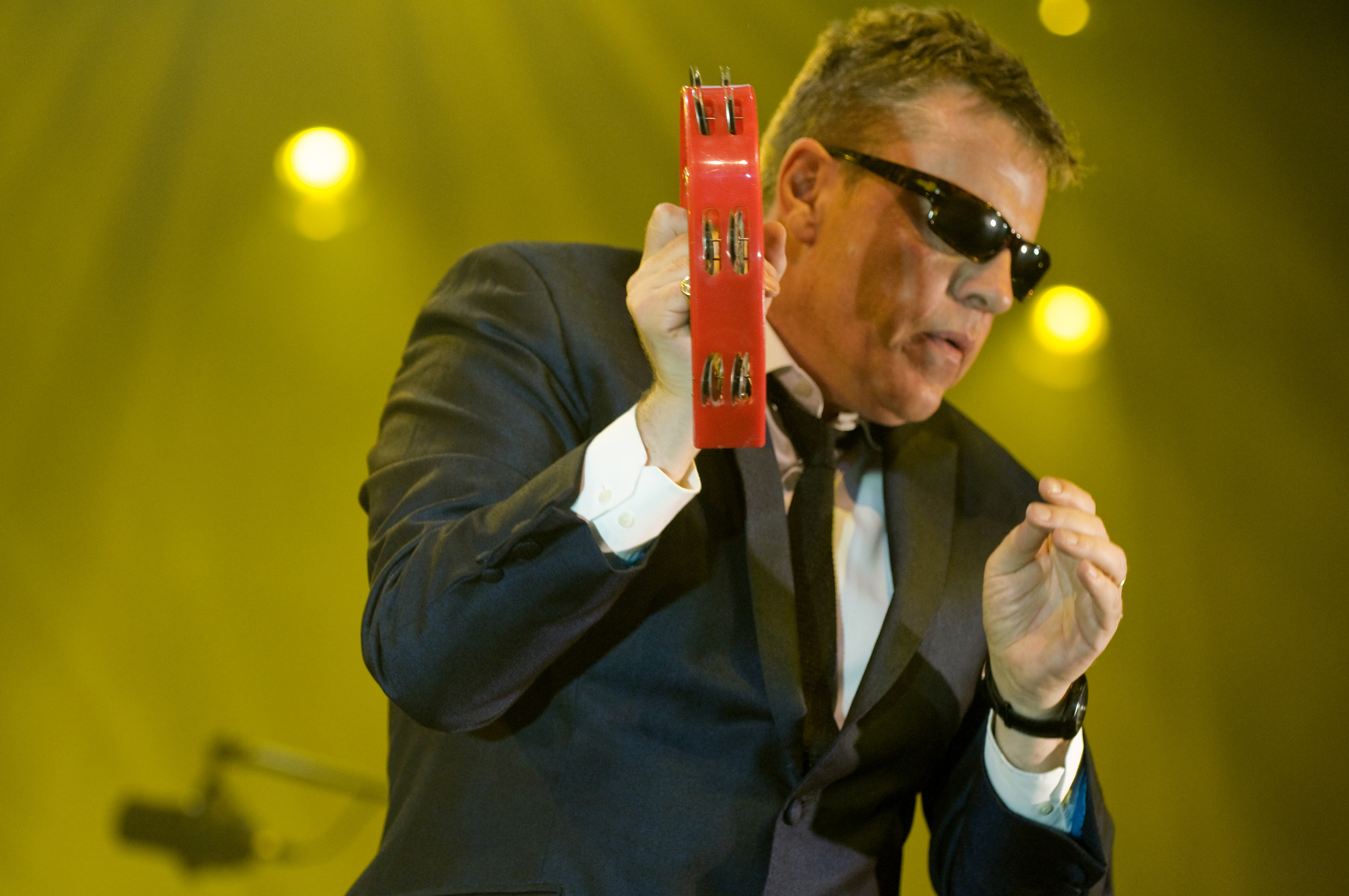
- Suggs performing live with Madness in 2009
- Born: Graham McPherson; 13 January 1961 (age 65); Hastings, England
- Occupations: Singer-songwriter; musician; radio personality; actor
- Years active: 1977–present
- Spouse: Bette Bright (m. 1981)
- Children: 2
- Musical career
- Genres: Ska; pop; new wave; 2 tone
- Instruments: Vocals; keyboards; guitar; percussion
- Labels: Warner Music; Cherry Red; Atlantic; Universal Music TV
- Member of: Madness
- Formerly of: The Madness
- Suggs's voice from the BBC programme Front Row, 2 May 2013

Graham McPherson (born 13 January 1961), known by his stage name Suggs, is an English singer-songwriter, musician, radio personality and actor.

Suggs came to prominence in the late 1970s as the lead singer of the ska band Madness, who had fifteen top 10 singles in the United Kingdom during the 1970s, 1980s and 1990s, including "My Girl", "Baggy Trousers", "Embarrassment", "It Must Be Love", "House of Fun", "Driving in My Car", "Our House", "Wings of a Dove" and "Lovestruck". Suggs began his solo career in 1995, while still a member of Madness. Since then, he has released two studio albums and two compilation albums. His solo hits include "I'm Only Sleeping", "Camden Town", "Cecilia" and "Blue Day".

Suggs has also been an actor, with roles in films, theatre and television.

== Early life ==
Graham McPherson was born on 13 January 1961 in Hastings to a Scottish father, William Rutherford McPherson (1935–1975) and Welsh mother, jazz singer Edith Gower. The couple had married in the Paddington area of London in 1960 and Suggs was raised in Hastings by his mother. His father had left by the time Suggs was three. In a 2009 interview, Suggs responded when asked about what happened to him:

I don't know, but what I've heard hasn't been good: heroin, injecting his eyeballs with paraffin, being sectioned. He must be dead now. I mean, he would have got in touch if he was alive, wouldn't he? Yeah, he must be dead, poor bugger.

Three years later in 2012, Suggs learned through Wikipedia that his father had died in 1975.

Suggs spent three years of his childhood in his mother's hometown of Haverfordwest, Wales, and had just started at a grammar school there when his mother moved to London. He then went to the Quintin Kynaston comprehensive school at St John's Wood. On the official Madness website, he has stated:

I was born in Hastings on a stormy evening on 13 January 1961. I only lived with my mum, so we were free agents. She was a singer in the pubs and clubs. We moved to Liverpool then London. I lived with relations in Wales for a while and came back to London. Because I was an only child, I was pretty insular and stubborn. All the upheaval made me lazy academically, so by the time I got to Quintin Kynaston school in St John's Wood I didn't bother much, I stayed onto the sixth form for social security reasons, and got two O-levels and a CSE on the way. I met Mike Barson hanging around Hampstead School.

Suggs got his nickname from randomly sticking a pin in an encyclopaedia of jazz musicians (hitting Peter Suggs) while he was still in school, to avoid being labelled as a member of an ethnic minority owing to his Scottish surname. To capitalise on the name he went as far as to create a myth about it, writing lines like "Suggs is our leader" on the walls and only answering to that name.

After leaving school, he worked at a butcher's shop for eight months, his first proper job. He also worked as a painter and decorator. The first gig he went to was the Who supported by the Sensational Alex Harvey Band in 1976.

== Career ==
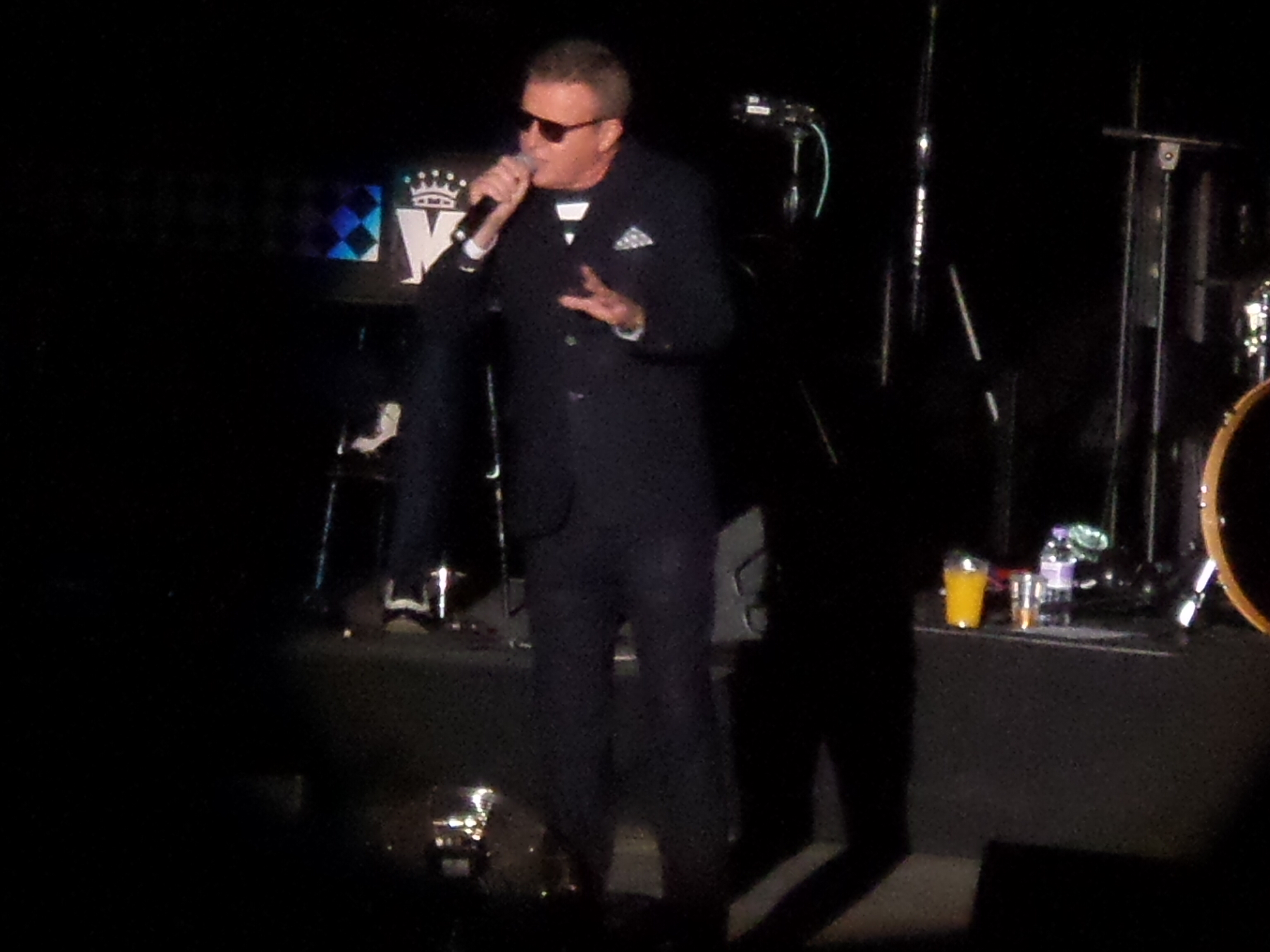
Suggs performing live with Madness at Manchester Arena, 2014

In 1976, Mike Barson, Chris Foreman and Lee Thompson formed the North London Invaders, which later became the band Madness. The original members recruited were John Hasler, Cathal Smyth and vocalist Dikran Tulaine. This six-piece line-up was stable until 1977, when Suggs took over the lead vocals and Tulaine left the band. After a decline in hits, the band broke up in 1986. Following the split of the band's spin-off, The Madness, Suggs has said that he felt "a bit lost" and he saw a psychotherapist on four occasions.

=== Solo career ===
By the end of 1988, Suggs was without a band for the first time since he was 16. During that interim period, he explored various endeavours as well as continuing to write music. He started working with former bandmate Mike Barson on an intended duo project as early as 1989. They started writing and producing songs such as "Alcohol", "She's Gone", and "Animal", the latter of which was used in the 1990 indie film The Final Frame, which Suggs starred in.

After Madness' reformation for Madstock! in 1992 and 1994, Suggs went to work on his first solo album with the production help of reggae producers Sly and Robbie. In 1995, The Lone Ranger was released on Warner Music and peaked on the UK Albums Chart at No. 14. The first single to be released from the album was a cover of the Beatles song "I'm Only Sleeping" entering the UK Top 10 at No. 7. Its music video featured appearances from Madness bandmates Mike Barson and Chas Smash. This was followed by "Camden Town", a homage to Suggs's favourite part of London, which reached No. 14 in the UK.

In December of that year, Suggs released The Christmas E.P. featuring his song "The Tune" (written by Mike Barson) plus covers of "Sleigh Ride" and "Alright" by Supergrass. In 1996, the third single from the album, a version of the Simon & Garfunkel song "Cecilia", became his most successful release, peaking at No. 4 in the UK and being certified silver by the British Phonographic Industry. The final single to be released from the album was "No More Alcohol", charting at No. 24.

In 1997, Suggs recorded the song "Blue Day" for Chelsea F.C. with Chelsea players. It was the official song for the team for the FA Cup, which Chelsea eventually won. The song reached No. 22 in the UK charts.

In 1998, Suggs released his second solo album, The Three Pyramids Club, on Warner Music, which was produced by Steve Lironi. The first and only single to be released was "I Am" charting at No. 38 in the UK. The song was also featured on the soundtrack to The Avengers. The album includes a collaboration with reggae artist General Levy and the trombone talents of ska legend Rico Rodriguez.

After completing his solo releases, Suggs returned to work with Madness on their first original album in fourteen years. Wonderful was released in 1999 and was followed by the cover album The Dangermen Sessions Vol. 1 in 2005. In 2009, Madness released The Liberty of Norton Folgate which reached No. 5 in the UK Album Charts.

Suggs – The Platinum Collection was released on 30 July 2007 on Warner Music, featuring a selection of Suggs best tracks from his two solo albums along with "Blue Day" and a remixed version of "Cecilia".

In 2008, Suggs contributed vocals to a cover of Al Bowlly's "Hang Out the Stars in Indiana" for the soundtrack for The Edge of Love, with the film soundtrack composed by Angelo Badalamenti. Suggs also made a cameo in the film, singing the track.

In 2025, Suggs partnered with local band Men With Ven to create an anthem for their local Non League football club Whitstable Town to commemorate the team's reaching Wembley for the FA Vase final, titled "WHITSTABLE (Town FC)". The Oysters went on to win the final 2–1 against AFC Whyteleafe, with the song being played around the stadium speakers before and after the match.

=== Musical collaborations ===
After the split of The Madness, Suggs served as a guest performer at some of Deaf School's reunion gigs in June 1988, performing a rendition of "My Girl". He did the same the following year for Deaf School's gig for the Big Beat '89 campaign in July 1989, which raised £750 for the Hillsborough disaster fund.

Suggs worked with Morrissey between late 1989 and early 1991, singing backing vocals on the tracks "Piccadilly Palare" and "Sing Your Life". From early 1990 to 1992, he co-managed The Farm and co-produced their first album Spartacus which reached number-one in the UK Album Charts and spawned the international hit "All Together Now". He also produced their first single "Hearts and Minds" in 1984.

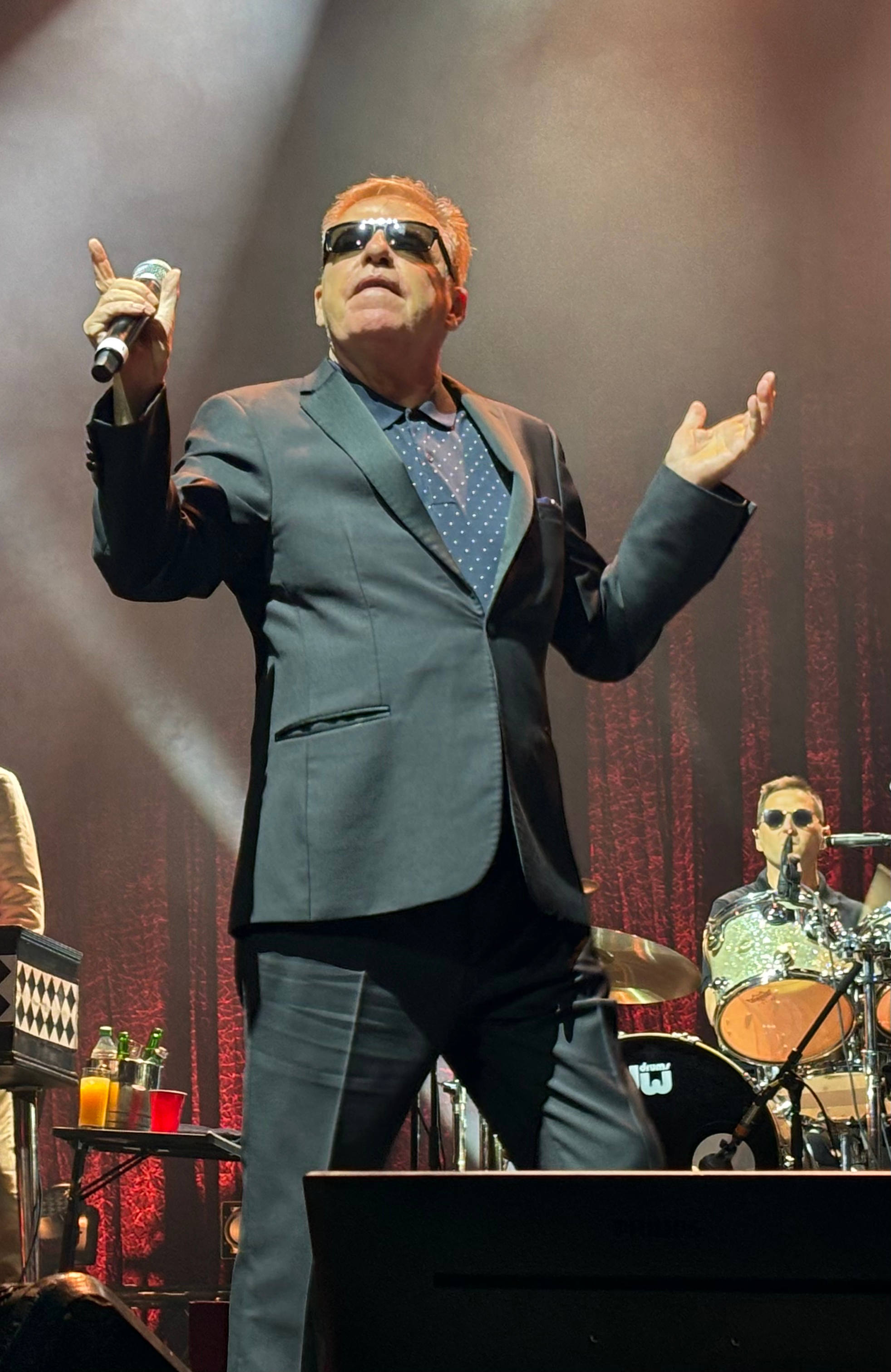
Suggs performs with Madness at MGM Fenway in Boston, Massachusetts, on 29 May 2024.

Suggs has collaborated with Jools Holland twice on his Small World Big Band albums, firstly in 2001 with the song "Oranges and Lemons Again" and then with "Jack O the Green" in 2003. He also played with Holland and his Rhythm and Blues Orchestra in 2003 for a television special where they performed two songs with veteran ska singer Prince Buster.

In July 2005, shortly after the terrorist attacks in London, Suggs and Chas Smash performed the Bob Marley song "So Much Trouble in the World" with Billy Bragg at a concert in London's Brockwell Park in aid of the victims. Also in 2005, Suggs collaborated with electronic group Audio Bullys on the track "This Road" from their top 40 album Generation. In 2006, Suggs performed the Madness song "My Girl" with the Ordinary Boys at the Brixton Academy which was released as a B-side on their UK hit single "Nine2five".

In May 2008, Suggs and Chas Smash joined the Pet Shop Boys on stage at a gig in London's Heaven nightclub where they performed a dance version of the Madness song "My Girl". In 2010, Suggs and Mike Barson again worked with the Audio Bullys on their album Higher Than the Eiffel. They appear on the tracks "Twist Me Up" and "Goodbye". In 2024, Suggs appeared on the single Zombie Nation by Hastings rock band Kid Kapichi, and joined them on stage for a life performance at Kentish Town Forum in April.

Suggs co-wrote two songs with Paul Weller for Weller's 2024 album 66, "Ship of Fools" and "Nothing". Suggs also recently co-wrote and featured on rapper Skepta's single "Innocent Smile" from his forthcoming album Fork and Knife. Skepta wrote, "No better way to kick off than with Suggs (Madness) a British icon who I’ve rated all my Life. We started this song years ago as a Ska record but over the years I’ve been messing with the production, finally I added a break beat to it from Splice and the song came alive."

== Film and theatre ==
Suggs has acted in films such as The Tall Guy (1989) and Don't Go Breaking My Heart (1998). He starred in the Channel 4 drama The Final Frame (1990), in which he played a pop star named East. He also played a pop star (called Jason Wood) in the Press Gang episode "Friends Like These" in 1990. Suggs also appeared in the 2008 romantic drama The Edge of Love starring Keira Knightley and Sienna Miller, playing the part of "the crooner" (also credited as Al Bowlly) and singing Bowlly's hit "Hang Out the Stars in Indiana".

In late 2011, Suggs began a nationwide UK tour of a new one man stage show entitled "LIVESUGGS". In the show, Suggs shared various anecdotes from his childhood to the present day, intertwined with musical numbers. The show was well received by critics.

In 2003, Suggs appeared as Joe's dad in the stage musical Our House, featuring the songs of Madness, for a limited run in London's West End. The show then ran at Isis Prison, Woolwich. In November 2012, Suggs reprised his role of Joe's dad in the 10th Anniversary Concert of the musical Our House in aid of Help for Heroes.

== Radio ==
Suggs was a principal and original DJ on BBC Radio 6 Music when it launched in March 2002. He worked with Bob Monkhouse on the BBC Radio 4 musical sitcom I Think I've Got a Problem, also starring comedian Phil Cornwell and written by Andrew McGibbon.

He became a DJ on Virgin Radio with the show Virgin Party Classics, and was nominated for a Radio Academy Award in 2005. In 2006, Virgin launched the Party Classics radio channel, available via digital television. The channel was hosted by Suggs, but was short-lived, pulled just four months after it launched. The year 2007 saw him presenting a new show on the station five days a week entitled Afternoon Tea with Suggs which ran every weekday afternoon between 14:00 – 16:00. In August 2007, the show was given an extra hour and was on every weekday 13:00 – 16:00. It was produced by Mark Bingham.

On 3 December, Suggs quit Virgin and Neil Francis took over his weekday afternoon slot with immediate effect. On 27 September, Suggs and Madness closed down Regent Street to perform for Absolute Radio's first birthday. On 2 May 2013, he appeared on the "Cultural Exchange" feature of the BBC Radio 4 series Front Row, where he nominated a poem by John Betjeman ("On a Portrait of a Deaf Man"), as a piece of art work which he had found particularly meaningful.

== Television ==
Suggs appeared twice with Madness on the British TV comedy show The Young Ones, first on the episode "Boring" in which the band performed "House of Fun". On the second series, the band performed "Our House" on the penultimate episode "Sick".

Suggs has hosted the celebrity karaoke game show Night Fever on the UK's Channel 5. He was a team captain in the BBC music trivia game show A Question of Pop, hosted by Jamie Theakston, opposite Noddy Holder. He has also appeared as a guest on the BBC Two show Never Mind the Buzzcocks.

He has co-presented two series of the programme Salvage Squad, one restoring a Model T Ford, and one restoring a Ruston-Bucyrus 10RB in which a group of engineers restored rare old machinery. Some other items restored included a steamroller, a ploughing engine called "Margaret", a Blackpool "Coronation" tram, a Scammell Mechanical Horse, a Revopak garbage truck, various boats, World War II tanks, early C20 motor launches, railway locomotives and vintage cars.

In 2005, he filmed the series Disappearing London for ITV in the London area, in which he investigated architectural and other curiosities that are vanishing. The series won three Royal Television Society awards with Suggs winning the award for "Presenter of the Year". A second series was filmed in 2006 for transmission in early 2007. In 2005 he filmed a similar one-off programme for the BBC entitled A Picture of London by Suggs, which featured the newly penned song "Cracks in the Pavement". Suggs has twice been a guest presenter on the BBC's long-running chart show Top of the Pops, once in 1995 and again in 2005.

In 2006, Suggs was the main presenter of the BBC London series Inside Out, a weekly programme for Londoners looking at surprising stories in the capital. He was part of Declan Donnelly's Boy Band on Ant & Dec's Saturday Night Takeaway the same year and performed "It Only Takes a Minute" by Take That.

In 2007, Suggs starred in a series of Birds Eye commercials which feature the Madness song "Our House". An online game featuring Suggs was also based on the commercials. In December 2007, he narrated a one-off documentary for ITV on the London music venue the Hammersmith Palais, which had closed down in 2007. The programme was broadcast on BBC Four on Christmas Eve.

In February 2008, Teachers TV broadcast Suggs in a one-off "Teaching Challenge". The challenge required Suggs to return to his secondary school, Quintin Kynaston School in North London, and teach a music lesson to a group of GCSE students. In this lesson he was assisted by vocalist Paul Curtis, his voice coach Ben Cross and his valet S.I. Boy. The class performed Curtis's "Name It You Got It". Also in 2008, he presented his own chat show titled Suggs in the City. The show, set in the Soho members club The Colony Room, aired on ITV London on Thursday nights. In October 2008, he presented a new culture series called Suggs' Italian Job which was aired on Sky Arts, following the singer around Italian culturally significant hot spots.

In 2009, Suggs performed with Zoë Ball in Let's Dance For Comic Relief dancing to "You Can Never Tell" from Pulp Fiction but was eliminated. He also appeared in an episode of Australian music quiz show Spicks and Specks on 15 April that year.

In 2015, Suggs appeared as a panellist on QI, in series L episode 15.

In 2016, he performed with Madness on the ITV comedy Benidorm.

In 2017 and 2018, Suggs presented two series of the archaeology programme WW2 Treasure Hunters alongside detectorist Stephen Taylor on the TV channel HISTORY. During one episode, the team excavated a Covenanter tank, which had been buried in the chalky soil of Denbies Wine Estate near Dorking, Surrey for over 70 years. The tank was displayed at the vineyard for six months, before being removed for restoration. The second series, which began in November 2018, included a special WW1 episode.

In 2021, Suggs returned to present on Channel 5, when MTV Studios in London produced a three-hour video countdown for the channel known as The 80s & 90s Mega Mix (on My5), with Suggs presenting the 1980s lists (Vernon Kay hosted the rundowns from the 1990s).

== Other work ==
=== Charity ===
Suggs is a patron of the charity Children in Need, and has frequently appeared on the annual television fundraiser, performing various Madness tracks with other celebrities. He has also been involved with Cancer Research UK and their "Busking Cancer" campaign, for which he performed live with Rod Stewart on HMS Belfast in May 2009. Following the death of his sister-in-law Alanah in 2012 from pancreatic cancer, he organised a fundraising night for Pancreatic Cancer UK called An Evening with Suggs and Friends. Another event was held at Porchester Hall in London in March 2014. A third charity gala took place in March 2015.

=== Useless Information Society ===
Suggs is a member of the Useless Information Society (founded 1995), a society of journalists, writers and entertainers which focuses on esoteric information and has released books such as The Book of Useless Information. Other members include or have included Keith Waterhouse, Richard Littlejohn, Noel Botham, Ken Stott and Brian Hitchen.

=== Books ===
Suggs first tried writing a children's book in the interim period when Madness had split. However, the project was eventually aborted. In August 2009, Suggs published his first book, Suggs and the City: My Journeys Through Disappearing London, which is partly based on his TV series Disappearing London. In October 2013, Suggs released his autobiography, Suggs: That Close.

=== Stand-up comedy ===
After The Madness disbanded, Suggs attempted a career in stand-up comedy in the early summer of 1989. He hosted six alternative comedy nights deemed "The Last Laugh Comedy Club" at The Mean Fiddler in Harlesden. One of these performances saw the debut of his eventual solo song "Alcohol".

However, he was largely unsuccessful in the field, noted by his awkward and drunken behaviour, in which he "dropped the microphone stand a couple of times, and clambered groggily into the audience (twice) to trade repartee." In a 1995 interview for The Independent, he later stated "You learn from these things. I learnt I didn't want to do that again."

In an interview with Melody Maker in July 1989, Suggs further explained how he felt about stand-up:

"I was terrified, I was mummified. I could've been preserved at that moment and I would've lasted 1,000 years... It's mentally exhausting. I had an idea it would be, but I was overly optimistic ― stumbling out there and seeing what would happen. Of course, I was worried that people wouldn't laugh. I think they laughed once. I don't think I warmed to them and I don't think they warmed to me too much."

== Personal life ==
In August 2012, Suggs appeared at the Queen's Hall in Edinburgh as part of the Festival Fringe. In his show Suggs: My Life Story in Word and Music, he talked about his early life and his search to find out more information about his father. He referenced his Wikipedia entry and stated that some published information relating to his early life was untrue, adding that he would get bored in interviews and make things up. He confirmed that although he was born in Hastings, the family moved around and he spent much of his early life in Wales. Suggs stated that his father left when he was three, not before he was born.

Suggs is married to singer Bette Bright, who is the vocalist of the 1970s British band Deaf School. They met through their connection with Clive Langer, married in 1981 and formerly lived in Holloway. Since 2002, Suggs has also owned a house in Apulia, Italy.

In the interim period when Madness had split in the late 1980s, Suggs struggled with his mental health and developed paranoia, due to extreme anxiety about his future and how he would provide for his family. Consequently, he started taking ecstasy but soon regretted it. As such, he started seeing a therapist, who simply told him to stop taking ecstasy as it fuelled his paranoia and explained to him that he was simply scared after leaving the comfort zone of the band.

In April 2025, Suggs revealed he had become teetotal some months previously, saying that he had realised he suffered from alcoholism and that drink had become "more important than anybody or anything else".

He is a lifelong fan of Chelsea Football Club.

== Discography ==
=== Albums ===
- The Lone Ranger (16 October 1995) – UK No. 14 (BPI: Silver)
- The Three Pyramids Club (7 September 1998) – UK No. 82
- The Platinum Collection (30 July 2007)

=== Singles ===
Year	Single	Peak positions				Certifications	Album
Year	Single	UK	AUT	IRE	NZ	Certifications	Album
1995	"I'm Only Sleeping" / "Off on Holiday"	7	—	—	—		The Lone Ranger
1995	"Camden Town"	14	—	26	—		The Lone Ranger
1995	"The Tune"	33	—	—	—		The Lone Ranger
1996	"Cecilia"	4	28	10	44	BPI: Silver	The Lone Ranger
1996	"No More Alcohol"	24	—	—	—		The Lone Ranger
1997	"Blue Day"	22	—	—	—		Non-album single
1998	"I Am"	38	—	—	—		The Three Pyramids Club
2022	"Ooh Do U Fink U R" (with Paul Weller)	—	—	—	—		Non-album single
2023	"Ooh Do U Fink U R" (reissue) (with Paul Weller)	—	—	—	—		Record Store Day non-album single
"—" denotes a recording that did not chart or was not released in that territory.

- Both "Cecilia" and "No More Alcohol" feature uncredited vocals by Louchie Lou & Michie One

=== Other appearances ===
Year	Song	Album
1986	"Live-In World"	Standalone single by The Anti-Heroin Project
1990	"Piccadilly Palare"	Bona Drag by Morrissey
1991	"Sing Your Life"	Kill Uncle by Morrissey
1998	"I Am"	The Avengers: The Album
2001	"Oranges and Lemons Again"	Small World Big Band by Jools Holland, his Rhythm & Blues Orchestra and friends
2003	"Jack O the Green"	Jack O The Green: Small World Big Band Friends 3 by Jools Holland & his Rhythm & Blues Orchestra
2005	"This Road"	Generation by Audio Bullys
2006	"My Girl" (live at Brixton Academy)	"Nine2Five" by The Ordinary Boys
2007	"Valse/Ladies How Vain"	How To Dress Sensibly by English Eccentrics
2008	"Hang Out the Stars in Indiana"	The Edge of Love: Music from the Motion Picture
2010	"Twist Me Up"	Higher Than the Eiffel by Audio Bullys
2014	"Let's Go Crazy"	Purple Reggae by Radio Riddler
2014	"All Together Now"	Standalone single by The Peace Collective
2016	"Had A Nice Night"	Practice by The Clang Group
2024	"Zombie Nation"	There Goes the Neighbourhood by Kid Kapichi
2024	"Ship of Fools"/"Nothing"	66 by Paul Weller
2025	"WHITSTABLE (Town FC)"	Standalone single by Men With Ven
2026	"Innocent Smile"	Fork and Knife by Skepta

== Filmography ==
=== Television ===
Year	Title	Role	Notes
1990	Press Gang	Jason Wood	One episode / credited as Graham 'Suggs' McPhearson
1990	The Final Frame	East	Television movie
2017	Benidorm	Himself	

=== Film ===
Year	Title	Role	Notes
1989	The Tall Guy	Himself	Cameo
1999	Don't Go Breaking My Heart	Rex	
2006	Talk	John	Short film
2007	The Vexxer	Sänger	Uncredited
2008	The Edge of Love	Al Bowlly	
2009	Billy & Lily Go to New York	Himself	
2018	Suggs: My Life Story	Himself	

Taken from IMDb
