= I'm Only Sleeping =

1966 song by the Beatles

- Cover of the Northern Songs sheet music (licensed to Sonora Musikförlag)

Song by the Beatles
- Released: 5 August 1966 (UK: Revolver); 20 June 1966 (US: Yesterday and Today)
- Recorded: 27 and 29 April, 5 and 6 May 1966
- Studio: EMI, London
- Genre: Psychedelia; folk rock; psychedelic rock
- Length: 3:02
- Label: Parlophone
- Songwriter: Lennon–McCartney
- Producer: George Martin

Audio sample
- "I'm Only Sleeping": file; help

Music video
- "I'm Only Sleeping" on YouTube

"I'm Only Sleeping" is a song by the English rock band the Beatles from their 1966 studio album Revolver. In the United States and Canada, it was one of the three tracks that Capitol Records cut from the album and instead included on Yesterday and Today, released two months before Revolver. Credited as a Lennon–McCartney song, it was written primarily by John Lennon. The track includes a backwards lead guitar part played by George Harrison, the first time such a technique was used on a pop recording.

Since the standardisation of the Beatles' catalogue for its international CD release in 1987, the song has appeared on Revolver in North America. The 1996 Anthology 2 compilation includes outtakes of the song from the Revolver sessions, including an instrumental version that features the Beatles' first use of a vibraphone. In 2018, the music staff of Time Out London ranked "I'm Only Sleeping" at number 18 on their list of the best Beatles songs.

== Background and inspiration ==
The first draft of Lennon's lyrics for "I'm Only Sleeping", written on the back of a letter from 1966, suggests that he was writing about the joys of staying in bed rather than any drug euphoria sometimes read into the lyrics. While not on tour, Lennon would usually spend his time sleeping, reading, writing or watching television, often under the influence of drugs, and would have to be woken by McCartney for their songwriting sessions. In a London Evening Standard article published on 4 March 1966, Maureen Cleave, a friend of Lennon, wrote: "He can sleep almost indefinitely, is probably the laziest person in England. 'Physically lazy,' he said. 'I don't mind writing or reading or watching or speaking, but sex is the only physical thing I can be bothered with any more.'"

== Recording ==
The recording of the song began at EMI Studios on 27 April 1966 with eleven takes of the rhythm track, comprising two acoustic guitars, bass and drums. Five further takes of the song were recorded but they were not used. Take 11 was chosen as the master and two days later Lennon added his lead vocals. On 5 May, George Harrison wrote and recorded the double guitar part. The next day the recording was completed by Lennon, McCartney and Harrison's backing vocals.

The song features the then-unique sound of a reversed guitar duet played by Harrison in a five-hour late-night recording session with producer George Martin. Harrison perfected the part with the tape running backwards so that, when reversed, it would fit the dreamlike mood. One guitar was recorded with fuzz effects, the other without. Engineer Geoff Emerick described the meticulous process as "interminable". "I can still picture George hunched over his guitar for hours on end", Emerick wrote in 2006, "headphones clamped on, brows furrowed in concentration."

During the break before the second bridge, the sound of a yawn can be heard, preceded by Lennon saying to McCartney, "Yawn, Paul."

== Release ==
"I'm Only Sleeping" was first released on 20 June 1966 as the second track on the US album Yesterday and Today and on 5 August 1966 as the third track on Revolver, the album for which the song was originally intended. The US version of Revolver did not include the song as it had already been released: US Beatles releases frequently differed from the British versions.

The mono and stereo versions of "I'm Only Sleeping" differ in the positioning and length of the backwards guitar parts:

- US mono version (mixed on 12 May 1966): No backwards track during the second verse but a quick fragment is heard on the "time" in "taking my time" and "ceiling" in "lying there and staring at the ceiling". The track is fully intact during the instrumental break and continues into the words "please don't" in "please don't spoil my day". Near the end of the song the backwards track starts four beats after the last word "sleeping".
- US rechannelled stereo version: This version was mixed from the US mono version of the song but has far more reverb. It was used only on the initial pressing of the Yesterday and Today album.
- US stereo version (20 May): Backwards track on "running everywhere at such a speed" and "till they find there's no need". The track fades in two bars into the solo but continues into the word "please" in "please don't spoil my day". At the end of the song, the track starts immediately after the word "sleeping".
- UK mono version (6 June): Backwards track on "where at such a speed", "there's no need" and "staring at the ceiling". The track stops at the end of the solo and at the end of the song, starts immediately after the word "sleeping". Of the five mixes of "I'm Only Sleeping", this version features the most extensive amount of backwards guitar.
- UK stereo version: Backwards track on "everywhere at such a speed" and "find there's no need". The track stops at the end of the solo and at the end of the song, starts immediately after the word "sleeping".

The Beatles' pioneering studio effects on Revolver proved highly influential on other contemporary artists. Musicologist Walter Everett cites the inclusion of backwards guitar parts on Crosby, Stills & Nash's 1969 song "Pre-Road Downs" as an apparent "homage" to "I'm Only Sleeping".

Since the release of the Beatles' music on CD in 1987, the UK stereo version of the album has become the standard version in the US. Part of an instrumental rehearsal of the song featuring a vibraphone and the first take of the song from 29 April 1966 were released on the 1996 album Anthology 2. The inclusion of the vibraphone part marked the Beatles' first use of this instrument and reflected the band's experimentation with new sounds during the Revolver sessions. The UK mono version of "I'm Only Sleeping" was released on CD as part of the 2009 The Beatles in Mono remastered box set.

=== Music video ===
An official music video, directed by Em Cooper, was released to YouTube on 1 November 2022. It won the Grammy Award for Best Music Video at the 66th Annual Grammy Awards in 2024.

The music video includes an animation of 1,300 oil paintings by Cooper, cut into a smooth video that rehighlights moments from the band's career, dreamlike sequences, and concluding with live action video of the artist cleaning her workspace.

== Cover versions ==
=== Suggs version ===
"I'm Only Sleeping/Off on Holiday"

Single by Suggs

from the album The Lone Ranger
- Released: July 31, 1995
- Genre: Pop
- Length: 4:17
- Label: WEA
- Songwriter: Lennon–McCartney
- Producer: Sly & Robbie

Suggs singles chronology
"I'm Only Sleeping/Off on Holiday" (1995)	"Camden Town" (1995)

Madness singer Suggs released a cover version of the song in July 1995, produced by Sly & Robbie, as the first single of his solo career and the lead single from his debut solo album The Lone Ranger. The single reached number 7 on the UK Singles Chart. The music video also featured fellow Madness members Mike Barson and Chas Smash, who also collaborated with him on other songs in the album.

==== Charts ====
Weekly charts

Chart (1995)	Peak position
UK Singles (Official Charts)	7

=== Other covers ===
- The Vines recorded a cover of the song which was featured on the tribute CD Then & Now, Australia Salutes The Beatles
- Quorthon of the Swedish extreme metal band Bathory recorded a cover version of the song, which was released on the third volume of In Memory Of Quorthon. The compilation album was released 3 June 2006.
- Rosanne Cash released a cover of the song on her 1995 album Retrospective.
- Jeff Tweedy released a cover of the song in February 2014

== Personnel ==
According to Ian MacDonald:

- John Lennon – lead and harmony vocals, acoustic guitar
- Paul McCartney – bass, harmony vocals, yawn
- George Harrison – acoustic guitar, backwards lead guitars, harmony vocals
- Ringo Starr – drums

== Sources ==
- Babiuk, Andy (2002). Beatles Gear: All the Fab Four's Instruments, from Stage to Studio. San Francisco, CA: Backbeat Books. ISBN 978-0-87930-731-8.
- Everett, Walter (1999). The Beatles as Musicians: Revolver Through the Anthology. New York, NY: Oxford University Press. ISBN 0-19-512941-5.
- Hoffmann, Frank (2016). Chronology of American Popular Music, 1900–2000. Abingdon, UK: Routledge. ISBN 978-0-415-97715-9.
- Lewisohn, Mark (2005) [1988]. The Complete Beatles Recording Sessions: The Official Story of the Abbey Road Years 1962–1970. London: Bounty Books. ISBN 978-0-7537-2545-0.
- MacDonald, Ian (2005). Revolution in the Head: The Beatles' Records and the Sixties (2nd rev. edn). Chicago, IL: Chicago Review Press. ISBN 978-1-55652-733-3.
- Miles, Barry (2001). The Beatles Diary Volume 1: The Beatles Years. London: Omnibus Press. ISBN 0-7119-8308-9.
- Reising, Russell (2006). "Vacio Luminoso: 'Tomorrow Never Knows' and the Coherence of the Impossible". In Womack, Kenneth; Davis, Todd F. (eds.). Reading the Beatles: Cultural Studies, Literary Criticism, and the Fab Four. Albany, NY: State University of New York Press. ISBN 0-7914-6716-3.
- Riley, Tim (2002) [1988]. Tell Me Why: A Beatles Commentary. Cambridge, MA: Da Capo Press. ISBN 978-0-306-81120-3.
- Rodriguez, Robert (2012). Revolver: How the Beatles Reimagined Rock 'n' Roll. Milwaukee, WI: Backbeat Books. ISBN 978-1-61713-009-0.
- Turner, Steve (2016). Beatles '66: The Revolutionary Year. New York, NY: HarperLuxe. ISBN 978-0-06-249713-0.
- Winn, John C. (2009). That Magic Feeling: The Beatles' Recorded Legacy, Volume Two, 1966–1970. New York, NY: Three Rivers Press. ISBN 978-0-307-45239-9.
