= The Lone Ranger (album) =

Studio album by Suggs
- Released: 16 October 1995
- Recorded: 1989–1995
- Genres: Reggae fusion; ska; pop
- Length: 46:29
- Label: WEA
- Producers: Suggs; Mike Barson; Sly and Robbie; TommyD

Suggs chronology
The Lone Ranger (1995)	The Three Pyramids Club (1998)

Alternative cover
- Cover for the 1996 reissue

Singles from The Lone Ranger
- 1. "I'm Only Sleeping" / "Off on Holiday" Released: August 1995; 2. "Camden Town" Released: October 1995; 3. "The Tune" Released: December 1995; 4. "Cecilia" Released: April 1996; 5. "No More Alcohol" Released: September 1996

The Lone Ranger is the debut solo album by Suggs, lead singer of the English second wave ska band Madness. It was released in 1995 and peaked at No. 14 in the UK Albums Chart. The album contains five singles which reached the UK Singles Chart, including covers of The Beatles' "I'm Only Sleeping" and Simon & Garfunkel's "Cecilia", the latter being Suggs' highest-charting solo single to date. The album track "4 am" was later re-recorded and appears on the 1999 Madness album Wonderful.

The Lone Ranger was reissued in 1996 with new artwork, a reordered track listing and including the single "No More Alcohol", a reworked version of the original album track "Alcohol". The album was reissued again in 2016 by Cherry Red Records as a two-CD deluxe edition, reverting back to its original cover.

== Background ==
=== Initial songwriting & recording ===
By the start of 1989, the short-lived incarnation of Madness―at that point known as The Madness― had split again, and Suggs went through a wilderness period in the following years, pursuing various endeavours such as acting, stand-up comedy, producing British band The Farm, and being a TV presenter on the BSB Power Station from 1990 to 1991 where he presented his own show Suggs on Saturday. During this time, Suggs also started working with fellow ex-Madness member Mike Barson sporadically to write and produce songs with him for what was intended to be a duo project, using Liquidator Studios, and traveling between their home studios in North London and Amsterdam.

By the time Suggs & Barson presented their ideas to music executive Rob Dickins, their collaborations amassed to about 60 songs, with some of the earliest songs including "Alcohol" and "Fortune Fish". Some notable songs included "Camden Town", which was Suggs' ode to where he lived, "4 am", which is a tribute to The Kinks, and "She's Gone", one of his earliest collaborations with Barson after The Madness.

The songs, including "Green Eyes", were co-produced with engineer Kevin Petrie, who also helped with "Alcohol" and "Fortune Fish". They also featured contributions by other producers, such as TommyD. Several of these self-produced songs also ended up as B-sides, such as "Bedazzled", "When You Came", and "Animal", the latter of which was first recorded in 1989 for the indie film The Final Frame, in which Suggs starred as a pop star named East.

By the time Madness reformed to promote Divine Madness, the duo had made significant progress. In a March 1992 issue of Q Magazine, Mike Barson said, "It’s good to be writing songs with Suggs again. We’re pleased with what we’ve done so far. The plan is to release them when we’re ready. I’ve no idea when that will be."

=== Further production & recording ===
Following the Madness reunion concert in 1992, which yielded the album Madstock!, Suggs became more involved in working on this album. However, Suggs was eventually convinced by Dickins to turn these songs into a solo album rather than a duo album like he and Barson had intended.

By 1994, after early production work on his own and with Barson, Dickins arranged for Suggs to work with producers Sly and Robbie on some songs. Dickins suggested "I'm Only Sleeping" as a track, while Sly and Robbie proposed "Cecilia" as one of the songs to work on. Other songs produced by Sly and Robbie are "Camden Town", "Haunted" and "Off on Holiday", and they also helped to produce "The Tune", a song written by Barson.

After the second Madstock concert, Madstock II, Suggs announced that he would pursue a solo career in August 1994, and made his first appearance as a solo artist in November on Danny Baker After All, performing "I'm Only Sleeping" and Morrissey's "Suedehead". His debut album The Lone Ranger was released in October 1995, peaked at No. 14 in the UK Albums Chart.

== Singles ==
Five singles were released from the album, all of which reached the UK Singles Chart. A cover of The Beatles' "I'm Only Sleeping", released as a double A-side with "Off on Holiday", reached No. 7 in August 1995. This was followed by "Camden Town", which reached No. 14 in October and then "The Tune", which peaked at No. 33 in December 1995. A cover of Simon & Garfunkel's "Cecilia" was the next single, peaking at No. 4 in May 1996 and becoming Suggs' highest-charting solo single to date. The final single to be released from the album, "No More Alcohol", is a reworked version of the original track "Alcohol". This reached No. 24 in September 1996. "No More Alcohol" was included on a 1996 reissue of the album with new artwork and a reordered track listing.

== Critical reception ==
Professional ratings
Review scores
Source	Rating
AllMusic	3/5 stars
NME	2/10
Record Collector	3/5 stars
Select	2/5 medals

Upon the album's release, Victoria Segal of Melody Maker was critical of "Camden Town" and "I'm Only Sleeping", describing them as being "as welcome as haemorragic fever", but felt "the rest [of the album was] actually OK, in a predictably perky, ska-ed up way". Johnny Cigarettes of NME was negative in his review, believing the album to be merely a money-making endeavour without "a single good excuse for [it] to exist", although he did note a "couple of mildly agreeable contemplative ballads". He believed that the covers of 'I'm Only Sleeping' and 'Cecilia' were recorded merely for "maximum commercial muscle" and also noted that the single "Camden Town" "borrows a hefty chunk of credible trendiness". He added, "Rope in Sly and Robbie to try and prove your authentic credentials, roll out the jaunty feel-good 'reggie' ditties, sit back and watch the cash roll in."

Evan Cater, writing for AllMusic, wrote, "The Lone Ranger has the feel of an amateur demo, populated primarily by drum machines and synthesizers, but despite the weakness of the production, Suggs manages credible covers of the Beatles' 'I'm Only Sleeping' and Simon and Garfunkel's 'Cecilia'." Cater was not impressed with Suggs' songwriting on the tracks he wrote by himself, but felt that he fared better on the ones he co-wrote with Mike Barson, "who appears to have a stronger sense of melody". Trouser Press described the album as delivering "much the same ska pop mixture and music hall jollity as [Madness], but with more weight to the production." In a review of the 2016 reissue, Record Collector's Mark Elliott commented that the "charming, 60s-influenced, 11-song set hits the sweet spot where an experimental edge packs an impressive commercial punch and everyone emerges with their dignity intact".

== Track listing ==
Adapted from the album's liner notes.

=== Original version ===
No.	Title	Writer(s)	Length
1.	"I'm Only Sleeping"	John Lennon; Paul McCartney	4:20
2.	"Camden Town"	Graham McPherson; Mike Barson	3:52
3.	"Alcohol"	McPherson	4:27
4.	"4 am"	McPherson; Barson	3:32
5.	"The Tune"	Barson	4:35
6.	"Cecilia"	Paul Simon	3:08
7.	"Haunted"	McPherson	3:53
8.	"Off on Holiday"	McPherson	4:04
9.	"Green Eyes"	McPherson; Barson; Cathal Smyth	3:51
10.	"Fortune Fish"	McPherson	5:31
11.	"She's Gone"	McPherson; Barson	5:11

=== 1996 reissue ===
No.	Title	Writer(s)	Length
1.	"Cecilia"	Simon	3:04
2.	"No More Alcohol"	McPherson	2:45
3.	"I'm Only Sleeping"	Lennon; McCartney	4:20
4.	"Camden Town"	McPherson; Barson	3:54
5.	"4 am"	McPherson; Barson	3:31
6.	"The Tune"	Barson	4:34
7.	"Haunted"	McPherson	4:34
8.	"Off on Holiday"	McPherson	4:04
9.	"Green Eyes"	McPherson; Barson; Smyth	3:51
10.	"Fortune Fish"	McPherson	5:27
11.	"Alcohol"	McPherson	4:27
12.	"She's Gone"	McPherson; Barson	5:12

Note

- "No More Alcohol" is a reworked version of "Alcohol".

=== 2016 reissue ===
Disc one

- The first disc contains the eleven tracks from the original album plus eight bonus tracks.

Bonus tracks
No.	Title	Writer(s)	Length
12.	"Bedazzled" (B-side of "Camden Town")	McPherson	3:35
13.	"Animal" (B-side of "I'm Only Sleeping"/"Off on Holiday")	McPherson	4:33
14.	"When You Came" (B-side of "I'm Only Sleeping"/"Off on Holiday")	Barson	3:35
15.	"Sleigh Ride" (from The Christmas EP, 1995)	Leroy Anderson; Mitchell Parish	3:14
16.	"Alright" (from The Christmas EP)	Gaz Coombes; Danny Goffey; Mick Quinn	3:45
17.	"I Feel Good" (B-side of "Cecilia")	James Brown	3:15
18.	"Cecilia" (7" mix)	Simon	3:04
19.	"No More Alcohol" (7" mix) (new 1996 recording of "Alcohol")	McPherson	2:44

Note

- "Animal" was first recorded in 1989 for the indie film The Final Frame, in which Suggs starred as a pop star named East. He and Barson produced it, and it was later reworked as a B-side.

Disc two

The mixes
No.	Title	Writer(s)	Length
1.	"Camden Town" (Camden Chili Pepper Dub) (B-side of "Camden Town")	McPherson; Barson	7:06
2.	"Camden Town" (Ragga in London Dub Instrumental) (B-side of "Camden Town")	McPherson; Barson	3:42
3.	"Off on Holiday" (Instrumental) (B-side of "I'm Only Sleeping"/"Off on Holiday")	McPherson	4:01
4.	"The Tune" (Instrumental) (B-side of "Cecilia")	Barson	4:14
5.	"Cecilia" (Rapino's 7" mix) (B-side of "Cecilia")	Simon	3:39
6.	"Cecilia" (Rapino's 12" Disco Instrumental) (B-side of "Cecilia")	Simon	6:05
7.	"Cecilia" (Rapino's 12" Disco Mix) (B-side of "Cecilia")	Simon	6:07
8.	"Cecilia" (Deep Pan Mix) (B-side of "Cecilia")	Simon	4:02
9.	"Cecilia" (Drumapella Mix) (B-side of "Cecilia")	Simon	4:02
10.	"Cecilia" (Alternative Mix) (B-side of "Cecilia")	Simon	3:07
11.	"No More Alcohol" (Rapino's Dance Mix) (B-side of "No More Alcohol")	McPherson	5:32
12.	"No More Alcohol" (Segue Mix) (B-side of "No More Alcohol"/"Cecilia" Segue Mix)	McPherson	2:56
13.	"Cecilia" (Segue Mix) (B-side of "No More Alcohol"/"Cecilia" Segue Mix)	Simon	2:51
14.	"No More Alcohol" (100% Proof Mix) (B-side of "No More Alcohol"/"Cecilia" Segue Mix)	McPherson	5:45
15.	"No More Alcohol" (Karaoke Mix) (B-side of "No More Alcohol"/"Cecilia" Segue Mix)	McPherson	2:43

== Personnel ==
Credits adapted from the album's liner notes.

Although no musicians are credited on the album, the following are thanked:

- Jah Wobble
- Phil Spalding
- Rico Rodriguez
- Jazz Jamaica
- John Themis
- Sly and Robbie
- Louchie Lou and Michie One (on "Cecilia")
- Ben Barson (on "Alcohol")
- Anne Dudley – string arrangement on "She's Gone"

Technical

- Suggs – production (3, 4, 9–11), booklet photography
- Mike Barson – production (3, 4, 9–11)
- Sly and Robbie – production (1, 2, 6–8), additional production (5), mixing (1, 2, 5–8)
- TommyD – production (5)
- Garry Hughes – additional production (2, 6–8)
- Kevin Petrie – additional production, engineer (3, 4, 9–11)
- Paul Taylor – additional production, mixing (4, 9)
- Pete Craigie – additional production, mixing (4, 9)
- Gregg Jackman – mixing (3, 10, 11)
- Trevor Key – booklet cover photography
- Ben Kelly – art direction (from an original idea by Marcel Duchamp)
- Assorted Images – artwork
- Jill Furmanovsky – booklet photography
- Eugene Adebari – booklet photography
- Gavin Evans – booklet photography
- Rob Dickins – executive producer

2016 reissue bonus tracks

- Louchie Lou and Michie One – vocals (17, 19)
- Suggs – production (12, 13, 15, 16)
- Mike Barson – production (12–16)
- Sly and Robbie – production (17)
- Garry Hughes – additional production (17)
- The Rapino Brothers – production (19)
- Bobby Dee – production (19)
- Gregg Jackman – engineering, mixing (19)
- Collin "Bulby" York – remix (disc two: 1, 2)
- Pepperoni – remix (disc two: 8, 9)

== Charts ==
Chart performance for The Lone Ranger
Chart (1995)	Peak position
UK Albums (Official Charts)	14

Singles

Year	Singles	Chart position	
Year	Singles	UK	IRE
1995	"I'm Only Sleeping"/"Off on Holiday"	7	—
1995	"Camden Town"	14	26
1995	"The Tune"	33	—
1996	"Cecilia"	4	10
1996	"No More Alcohol" (new version of "Alcohol")	24	—
