= The Tube (2003 TV series) =

British television series

- Series One titlecard
- Narrated by: Jonathan Kydd
- No. of series: 3
- No. of episodes: 21

Production
- Producer: Mosaic Films
- Running time: 25 mins

Original release
- Network: ITV London
- Release: 9 January 2003 – 5 January 2006

Related
- Disappearing London; How London Was Built

The Tube is a British television documentary about the London Underground network. The programme follows London Underground workers: drivers, station staff and managers, showing the Underground system to the public through their eyes. First shown on ITV London, it was later also broadcast on certain Sky television channels, including Sky Real Lives and Sky3.

The programme was produced by Mosaic Films first for Carlton Television, and later for ITV London and Sky Travel. To date, there have been three series produced, including a two-part special on the 7 July 2005 London bombings. The series is now sometimes repeated, mostly on Pick.

== Episodes ==
Series	Episodes	Originally broadcast
1	6 Episodes & 1 Special	2003
2	6 Episodes	2004
3	6 Episodes & 2 Specials	2005

=== Series One ===
Title	Original air-date	#	Episode Total	Overall Total
"Strike"	9 January 2003	1	1	1
"24 Hours"	16 January 2003	2	2	2
"One Under"	23 January 2003	3	3	3
"Rush Hour"	30 January 2003	4	4	4
"Woman Drivers"	6 February 2003	5	5	5
"Heatwave"	13 February 2003	6	6	6

=== Series One Special ===
Title	Original airdate	#	Special Total	Overall Total
"Busking on the Tube"	20 February 2003	1	1	7

=== Series Two ===
Title	Original air-date	#	Episode Total	Overall Total
"Underground Crime"	19 August 2004	1	7	8
"Mind the Gap"	26 August 2004	2	8	9
"Under Pressure"	2 September 2004	3	9	10
"The Ups and Downs"	9 September 2004	4	10	11
"Open All Hours"	16 September 2004	5	11	12
"All Change Please"	23 September 2004	6	12	13

=== Series Three ===
Title	Original air-date	#	Episode Total	Overall Total
"Special Operations"	17 November 2005	1	13	16
"Losing It"	8 December 2005	2	14	17
"Tickets Please"	15 December 2005	3	15	18
"Off the Rails"	22 December 2005	4	16	19
"The Train Set"	29 December 2005	5	17	20
"Moving On (Old & New)"	5 January 2006	6	18	21

=== Series Three Special ===
Title	Original airdate	#	Special Total	Overall Total
"Under Attack 1"	8 November 2005	2	1	14
"Under Attack 2"	10 November 2005	3	2	15

== DVD release ==
Due to the popularity of the series, Two DVD sets were released in 2007. Series One and Two were available as one double set; While Series Three was released as a single set. Special features include train footage and photographs.

Series	Episodes	Originally broadcast	DVD release date (R2)
1 & 2	12 Episodes & 1 Special	2003 & 2004	2007
3	6 Episodes & 2 Specials	2005	2007
