= W. Kenneth Holditch =

American professor (1933–2022)

William Kenneth Holditch
- Born: 18 September 1933; Ecru, Mississippi
- Died: December 7, 2022 (aged 89); New Orleans, Louisiana
- Occupation: Educator
- Writing career
- Genre: literature

William Kenneth Holditch (September 18, 1933 – December 7, 2022) was a Professor Emeritus of English at the University of New Orleans. He was one of the pre-eminent scholars of the American playwright Tennessee Williams. Notably, he co-founded the Tennessee Williams Literary Festivals in New Orleans; Columbus, Mississippi; and Clarksdale, Mississippi, and he served on the advisory board of the festival in Provincetown, Rhode Island. His published works include Tennessee Williams and the South and The World of Tennessee Williams with Richard Freeman Leavitt as well as co-editor with Mel Gussow for the Library of America's Tennessee Williams Plays 1937-1955.

== Early life ==
Kenneth Holditch spent his childhood in Ecru, Clarksdale, Vicksburg, and Tupelo, Mississippi. He graduated from Southwestern at Memphis University in 1955 with honors in English. He received his Master of Arts (1957) and his Doctorate (1961) in English from the University of Mississippi. His dissertation was entitled The Development of Techniques in the Novels of John Dos Passos, and was the first Ph.D. granted at Ole Miss.

== Career ==
Holditch began his academic teaching career at Christian Brothers College Memphis, where he taught for three years. At the University of New Orleans, he taught in the English department from 1964 until his retirement in 1993. He is also the author of a play, Tennessee Williams and His Women, based on female characters in Tennessee William's life and work, ultimately receiving dramatic readings at Lincoln Center in New York City. He was co-founder of the William Faulkner Society and was instrumental in the formation of the Tennessee Williams Literary Festival in New Orleans in 1988. In addition, he created the Literary Walking Tour of the French Quarter in 1974, which not only visited sites where Tennessee Williams, William Faulkner, and Truman Capote lived, among others, but expanded his offerings to include their favorite restaurants and haunts He has also published and edited the Tennessee Williams Literary Journal for five years. Holditch also served as the book review editor for the States-Item newspaper and the Vieux Carré Courier. He delivered the eulogy for one of three Tennessee Williams funeral services, this one held in New Orleans and has written numerous essays on Southern authors, including William Spratling, Lilian Hellman, John Kennedy Toole, and John Dos Passos. The University of Mississippi (alma mater) has honored Kenneth Holditch by creating the Holditch Scholars Award, which is awarded to the best dissertation in English each year.

== John Kennedy Toole ==
Holditch conducted research on the New Orleans author John Kennedy Toole, who wrote A Confederacy of Dunces, preparing for a biography. Thelma Toole, his mother, left Holditch the unpublished manuscript of Toole's The Neon Bible with the caveat that it never be published. However, the family brought this matter to court with the book eventually being published. Holditch was asked to write the introduction.

== George Valentine Dureau ==
Holditch was a close friend of New Orleanian artist George Dureau and wrote the introduction to the catalog of his mid-career retrospective in 1977 entitled George Dureau: Selected Works 1960-1977 at the Contemporary Arts Center. Many of Dureau's work owned by Holditch were exhibited at the New Orleans Museum of Art in the exhibition entitled Gentlemen Callers: Paul Cadmus and George Dureau in 2008. He also delivered a eulogy at Dureau's memorial service at the Ogden Museum in 2013.

== Death ==
Holditch died at his New Orleans home on December 7, 2022, aged 89.

== Awards ==
- Southern Fellowship (Duke University) | 1958-1966
- Louisiana Teacher of the Year | 1985
- Lifetime Achievement Award - Louisiana Endowment for the Humanities | 2001
- Tennessee Williams Delta Literary Festival Award | 2007
- Tennessee Williams Scholar Award (Columbus, Mississippi) | 2008
- Saints & Sinners Festival Hall of Fame
- Lifetime Achievement Award - Mississippi Institute of Arts and Letters | 2022

== Works ==
- The World of Tennessee Williams (2011) | with Richard Freeman Leavitt
- Galatoire's: Biography of a Bistro (2004) | with Marda Burton
- Tennessee Williams and the South (2002) | with Richard Freeman Leavitt
- Tennessee Williams: Plays 1937-1955 (2000) | Edited by Kenneth Holditch and Mel Gussow
- The Last Frontier of Bohemia: Tennessee Williams in New Orleans (1987) | Kenneth Holditch
- In Old New Orleans (1983) | Edited by Kenneth Holditch
- Introduction to George Washington Cable's The Grandissimes: A Story of Creole Life
- Numerous essays and lectures on Southern writers, particularly those from Mississippi and associated with New Orleans
- Essays on Sacred Harp music and author John Kennedy Toole
- Dinner With Tennessee Williams: Recipes and Stories inspired by America's Southern Playwright (2011) | Troy Gilbert and Chef Greg Picolo with Dr. W. Kenneth Holditch
