= Neon Bible (disambiguation) =

Neon Bible is a 2007 album by Canadian band Arcade Fire.

Neon Bible may also refer to:

- The Neon Bible, a novel by John Kennedy Toole, published posthumously in 1989
- The Neon Bible (film), a 1995 film adaptation
