= Thoughts on Various Subjects, Moral and Diverting =

Essay by Jonathan Swift

Thoughts on Various Subjects, Moral and Diverting (1706) is the title of an essay by Jonathan Swift (1667–1745). It also has appeared under the title Thoughts on Various Subjects. It consists of a series of short epigrams or apothegms with no particular connections between them.

It contains the quotation "When a true genius appears in the world, you may know him by this sign, that the dunces are all in confederacy against him," the source for the title of the 1980 book A Confederacy of Dunces by John Kennedy Toole.

Other well-known quotes include:

- "The latter part of a wise man's life is taken up in curing the follies, prejudices, and false opinions he had contracted in the former."
- "Whatever the poets pretend, it is plain they give immortality to none but themselves; it is Homer and Virgil we reverence and admire, not Achilles or Aeneas. With historians it is quite the contrary; our thoughts are taken up with the actions, persons, and events we read, and we little regard the authors."
- "When a man is made a spiritual peer he loses his surname; when a temporal, his Christian name."
- "If a man would register all his opinions upon love, politics, religion, learning, etc., beginning from his youth and so go on to old age, what a bundle of inconsistencies and contradictions would appear at last!"
- "What they do in heaven we are ignorant of; what they do not we are told expressly: that they neither marry, nor are given in marriage."
