= Dr. Nut =

Defunct American soft drink

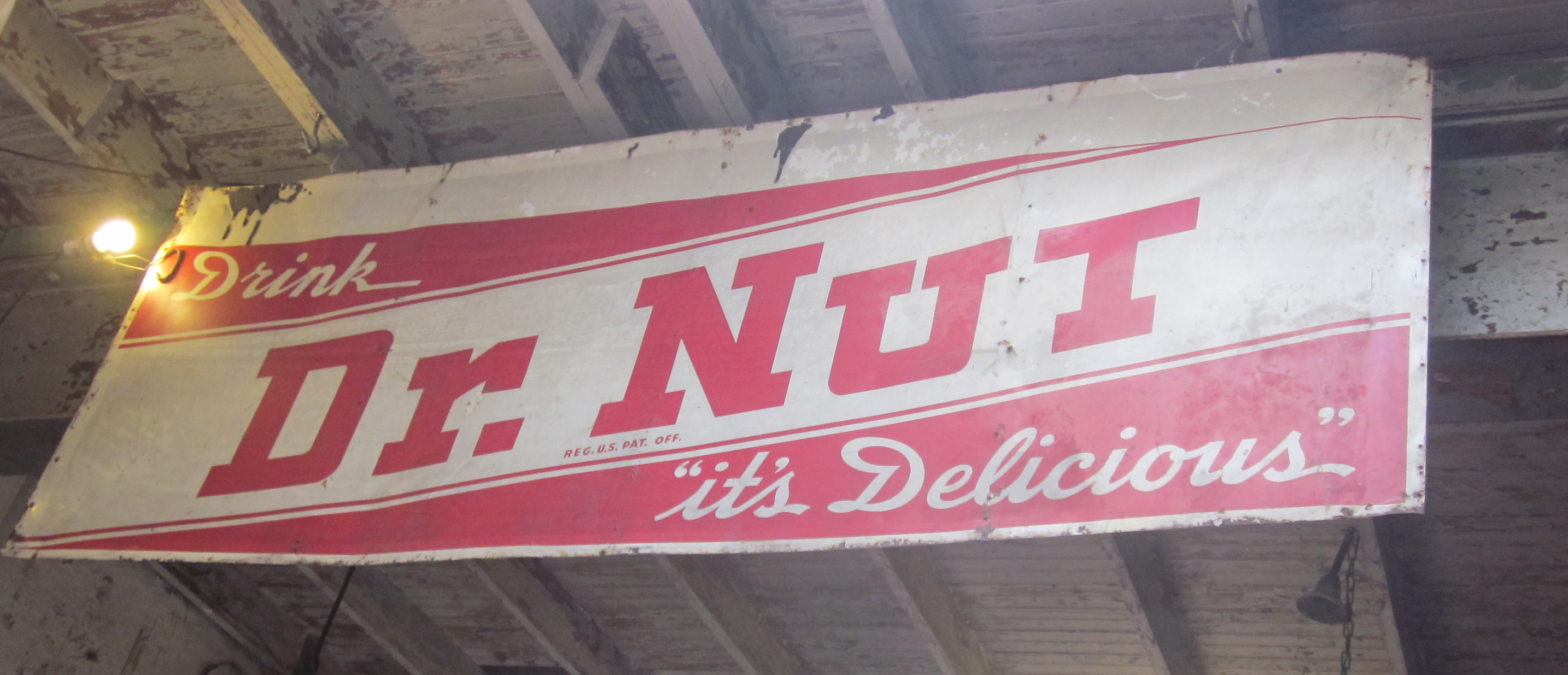
Old Dr. Nut sign

Dr. Nut was an American soft drink produced by New Orleans–based World Bottling Company (and later by another New Orleans company, Wright Root Beer). It was introduced in the 1930s and was produced until the late 1970s. Dr. Nut had a distinct almond flavor, similar to Amaretto liquor, and bottles were characterized by their plain logo depicting a squirrel nibbling on a large nut. In the 1940s it was marketed at a competitive price, was known for its slogans, and for having a man in a running costume who ran with the Mardi Gras parades.

The drink was made famous to a new generation in John Kennedy Toole's novel A Confederacy of Dunces, in which it is a favorite drink of the main character Ignatius Reilly. His copious consumption of the drink is a comic example of the discrepancies between Ignatius' purportedly ascetic medieval values and his undisciplined, gluttonous lifestyle.

By the time the novel saw print, the beverage was already out of production. A different company attempted to revive the product, but the taste of the new drink lacked the almond flavor of the original and was not well-liked by consumers.

Dr. Nut advertising used to feature a man on the beach, wearing half a nutshell as a bathing suit, and a squirrel as his friend. Many people dressed as this amusing figure during New Orleans' Mardi Gras parades.

== See also ==
- List of defunct consumer brands
