= Terence Davies =

English filmmaker (1945–2023)

- Davies in 2021
- Born: 10 November 1945; Liverpool, England
- Died: 7 October 2023 (aged 77); Mistley, England
- Occupations: Screenwriter; film director
- Years active: 1976–2023
- Website: terencedavies.com

Terence Davies (10 November 1945 – 7 October 2023) was an English filmmaker. He is best known as the writer and director of autobiographical films, including Distant Voices, Still Lives (1988), The Long Day Closes (1992) and the collage film Of Time and the City (2008), as well as the literary adaptations The Neon Bible (1995), The House of Mirth (2000), The Deep Blue Sea (2011) and Sunset Song (2015). His final two feature films were centered on the lives of influential literary figures, Emily Dickinson in A Quiet Passion (2016) and Siegfried Sassoon in Benediction (2021). Davies was considered by numerous critics as one of the great British directors of his period.

== Life and career ==
=== Early years and education ===
Terence Davies was born in Kensington, Liverpool, on 10 November 1945, as the youngest of ten children of working-class Catholic parents. Though he was raised Catholic by his deeply religious mother, at the age of 22 he rejected religion and considered himself an atheist. Davies's father, whom Davies remembered as "psychotic", died of cancer when Davies was seven years old. He recalled the period from then until he entered secondary school, at the age of 11, as the four happiest years of his life.

After leaving school at 16, Davies worked for ten years as a shipping office clerk and as an unqualified accountant, before leaving Liverpool in 1971 to attend Coventry Drama School.

=== Early short films ===
While at Coventry, Davies wrote the screenplay for what became his first autobiographical short, Children (1976), filmed under the auspices of the BFI Production Board. After that introduction to filmmaking, Davies attended the National Film School, completing Madonna and Child (1980), a continuation of the story of his alter ego, Robert Tucker, covering his years as a clerk in Liverpool. He completed the trilogy with Death and Transfiguration (1983), in which he speculates about the circumstances of his death. Those works went on to be screened together at film festivals throughout Europe and North America as The Terence Davies Trilogy, winning numerous awards. Davies, who was gay, frequently explored gay themes in his films.

=== First feature films ===
Davies's first two features, Distant Voices, Still Lives and The Long Day Closes, are autobiographical films set in Liverpool in the 1940s and 1950s. In reviewing Distant Voices, Still Lives, Jonathan Rosenbaum wrote that "years from now, when practically all the other new movies currently playing are long forgotten, it will be remembered and treasured as one of the greatest of all English films". In 2002, critics polled for Sight and Sound ranked Distant Voices, Still Lives as the ninth-best film of the previous 25 years. Jean-Luc Godard, often dismissive of British cinema in general, singled out Distant Voices, Still Lives as an exception, calling it "magnificent". The Long Day Closes was also praised by J. Hoberman as "Davies'[s] most autobiographical and fully achieved work".

Davies's next two features, The Neon Bible and The House of Mirth, were adaptations of novels by John Kennedy Toole and Edith Wharton respectively. The House of Mirth received favourable reviews, with Film Comment naming it one of the ten best films of 2000. Gillian Anderson won Best Performance in the Second Annual Village Voice Film Critics' Poll and the film was named the third best film of 2000 in the same poll.

=== Radio projects and Of Time and the City ===
After completing The House of Mirth, Davies intended to make an adaptation of Sunset Song, a novel by Lewis Grassic Gibbon published in 1932, as his fifth feature, but financing proved difficult. Scottish and international backers left the project after the BBC, Channel 4 and the UK Film Council each rejected proposals for final funds. Davies apparently considered Kirsten Dunst for the lead role before the project was postponed. Afterwards, he wrote an original contemporary-set romantic comedy screenplay, Mad About The Boy, and an adaptation of Ed McBain's crime novel He Who Hesitates, neither of which were produced.

In the interim, Davies produced two works for radio, A Walk to the Paradise Garden, an original radio play broadcast on BBC Radio 3 in 2001, and a two-part adaptation of Virginia Woolf's novel The Waves, broadcast on BBC Radio 4 in 2007.

The long interval between films ended with his only documentary, Of Time and the City, which was premiered out of competition at the 2008 Cannes Film Festival. The work uses vintage newsreel footage, contemporary popular music and Davies's narration in a paean to Liverpool. It received positive reviews on its premiere.

In 2010, after completing Of Time and the City, Davies produced a third radio project, Intensive Care, a personal recollection of his youth and his relationship with his mother.

=== Later films ===
Davies's The Deep Blue Sea, based on the play by Terence Rattigan, was commissioned by the Rattigan Trust. The film was met with widespread acclaim, and Rachel Weisz won the New York Film Critics Circle Award for Best Actress and topped the Village Voice Film Critics' Poll for best lead female performance.

Davies finally found financing for Sunset Song in 2012, and it went into production in 2014. In October 2014 the film went into post-production. It was released in 2015. During this time, an attempted adaptation of Richard McCann's Mother of Sorrows did not come to fruition.

Davies's next film was A Quiet Passion, based on the life of the American poet Emily Dickinson.

His last film, Benediction (2021), tells the story of the British war poet and memoirist Siegfried Sassoon.

In February 2023, it was announced that Davies was working on a film adaptation of Stefan Zweig's novel The Post Office Girl, though the project was subsequently abandoned due to a lack of funding. Davies said he was working on another script in September 2023, the month before he died. After his death, the script was revealed to be based on Janette Jenkins's novel Firefly, which focuses on the last five days in the life of playwright and composer Noël Coward.

=== Personal life and death ===
Davies lived in an 18th-century cottage in Mistley from the early 1990s until his death in 2023. Davies was openly gay and often explored gay themes in his work, though he said his most serious relationship was with a woman in the late 1970s, and that he later went "on to the gay scene for a couple of months" before deciding he was also uninterested in relationships with men. In 2015, he told The Guardian that he had been celibate for most of his life, adding in another interview with the newspaper in 2022 that he would "prefer to be lonely and on [his] own" than to live a life he "couldn't justify" to himself.

Discussing the impact his childhood had on him, Davies described his father as a "psychotic" man who made him feel "terrified all the time", and that the years following his father's death were the happiest of his childhood. He stated, "The one thing I can't bear now is atmospheres. I can come into a room full of people and I can tell you who's had [an argument]. I always say: if I've upset you, just come out with it. If you cold-shoulder me, I instantly see [my father] sitting in the corner of the parlour and I'm a seven-year-old again."

On 7 October 2023, at the age of 77, Davies died of cancer at his home in Mistley.

== Works ==
Source, unless specified:

Feature films

Year	Title
1988	Distant Voices, Still Lives
1992	The Long Day Closes
1995	The Neon Bible
2000	The House of Mirth
2011	The Deep Blue Sea
2015	Sunset Song
2016	A Quiet Passion
2021	Benediction

Documentary

Year	Title
2008	Of Time and the City

Short films

Year	Title	Notes
1976	Children	Also released in 1983 as part of the anthology film The Terence Davies Trilogy
1980	Madonna and Child	Also released in 1983 as part of the anthology film The Terence Davies Trilogy
1983	Death and Transfiguration	Also released in 1983 as part of the anthology film The Terence Davies Trilogy
2021	But Why?	Ephemeral film produced for the Vienna International Film Festival
2023	Passing Time	Produced for the Film Fest Gent's 2x25 project

=== Bibliography ===
Year	Title	Notes
1984	Hallelujah Now	novel
1992	A Modest Pageant	collected screenplays

== Awards and nominations ==
Year	Award	Category	Nominated work	Result	Ref.
1983	Chicago International Film Festival	Best Feature	The Terence Davies Trilogy	Nominated	
1988	Cannes Film Festival	FIPRESCI Prize	Distant Voices, Still Lives	Won	
1988	César Award	Best European Film	Distant Voices, Still Lives	Nominated	
1988	Locarno International Film Festival	Golden Leopard	Distant Voices, Still Lives	Won	
1988	Toronto International Film Festival	International Critics' Award	Distant Voices, Still Lives	Won	
1988	European Film Award	Best Film	Distant Voices, Still Lives	Nominated	
1988	European Film Award	Best Director	Distant Voices, Still Lives	Nominated	
1988	European Film Award	Best Music	Distant Voices, Still Lives	Nominated	
1989	London Film Critics Circle Award	Best Film	Distant Voices, Still Lives	Won	
1989	London Film Critics Circle Award	Best Director	Distant Voices, Still Lives	Won	
1989	Los Angeles Film Critics Association Award	Best Foreign Language Film	Distant Voices, Still Lives	Won	
1990	Independent Spirit Awards	Best Foreign Film	Distant Voices, Still Lives	Nominated	
1990	Belgian Film Critics Association	Grand Prix	Distant Voices, Still Lives	Won	
1990	Amanda Award, Norway	Best International Film	Distant Voices, Still Lives	Won	
1992	Evening Standard British Film Award	Best Screenplay	The Long Day Closes	Won	
1992	Cannes Film Festival	Palme d'Or	The Long Day Closes	Nominated	
1995	Cannes Film Festival	Palme d'Or	The Neon Bible	Nominated	
2000	USC Scripter Award	—N/a	The House of Mirth	Nominated	
2000	Satellite Award	Best Adapted Screenplay	The House of Mirth	Nominated	
2000	London Film Critics Circle Award	British Director of the Year	The House of Mirth	Nominated	
2000	New York Film Critics Circle Award	Best Director	The House of Mirth	Nominated	
2000	British Film Institute Award	Best British Independent Film	The House of Mirth	Nominated	
2001	British Academy Film Awards	Best British Film	The House of Mirth	Nominated	
2007	British Film Institute Fellowship	—N/a	—N/a	Won	
2008	London Film Critics Circle Award	British Director of the Year	Of Time and the City	Nominated	
2009	New York Film Critics Circle Award	Best Non-Fiction Film	Of Time and the City	Nominated	
2009	Chicago International Film Festival	Best Documentary	Of Time and the City	Nominated	
2009	Australian Film Critics Association Award	Best Documentary	Of Time and the City	Nominated	
2011	BFI London Film Festival	Best Film Award	The Deep Blue Sea	Nominated	
2012	Munich Film Festival	Best International Film	The Deep Blue Sea	Nominated	
2012	Cinequest Film Festival	Maverick Spirit Award	—N/a	Won	
2016	BFI London Film Festival	Best Film	A Quiet Passion	Nominated	
2016	Film Fest Gent	Grand Prix	A Quiet Passion	Won	
2017	Dublin Film Critics' Circle	Best Screenplay	A Quiet Passion	Nominated	

== See also ==
- List of British film directors
- List of atheists in film, radio, television and theatre
- Cinema of the United Kingdom
- Independent cinema in the United Kingdom
