= Of Time and the City =

2008 film by Terence Davies

- Directed by: Terence Davies
- Written by: Terence Davies
- Produced by: Solon Papadopoulos, Roy Boulter
- Cinematography: Tim Pollard
- Edited by: Liza Ryan-Carter
- Music by: Ian Neil
- Distributed by: British Film Institute
- Release dates: 28 May 2008 (Cannes); 31 October 2008 (United Kingdom)
- Running time: 72 minutes
- Country: United Kingdom

Of Time and the City is a 2008 British documentary collage film directed by Terence Davies. The film has Davies recalling his life growing up in Liverpool in the 1950s and 1960s, using newsreel and documentary footage supplemented by his own commentary voiceover and contemporaneous and classical music soundtracks.

The film premiered as part of the Special Screenings selection at the 2008 Cannes Film Festival where it received rave reviews. Time Out said "The one truly great movie to emerge so far (from Cannes)..... this film is as personal, as universal in its relevance, and as gloriously cinematic as anything he has done" and The Guardian called it "a British masterpiece, a brilliant assemblage of images that illuminate our past. Not only does it tug the heart-strings but it's also savagely funny." BBC TV film critic Mark Kermode nominated it as the best overall film of 2008 on his "Kermode Awards" section of The Culture Show. In 2018 Kermode placed the film at number one in a list of his favourite films of the previous ten years (2008-2018). Duane Byrge from The Hollywood Reporter lauded the film as "poetically composed" and a "masterwork".

Of Time and the City won Best Documentary in the Australian Film Critics Association awards for 2009. Following the success of the film, in 2010 the website People’s Stories: Liverpool Lives was launched with Heritage Lottery funding, created for Of Time and the City by producer Sol Papadopoulos and transmedia creator Krishna Stott. For the launch of the site the actors Jonathan Pryce, Alexei Sayle and Joe McGann contributed their own memories of the city.

== References within the film ==
=== Poetry and literature ===
- A Shropshire Lad by A. E. Housman (opening narration, with the line "the land of lost content")
- "Ozymandias" by Percy Bysshe Shelley
- Felician Myrbach ("If Liverpool did not exist, it would have to be invented.")
- Ulysses by James Joyce ("As you are now we once were.")
- King James Bible - Psalm 107 ("They that go down to the sea in ships..."), Psalm 137 ("By the waters of Babylon, where we sat down..."), etc.
- The Condition of the Working Class in England by Friedrich Engels ("Removed from the sight of happier classes, poverty may struggle along as it can.")
- "Crossing the Bar" by Alfred, Lord Tennyson ("Twilight and evening bell, And after that the dark!")
- "The Untold Want" by Walt Whitman ("Now voyager go forth to seek and find.")
- Willem de Kooning ("The trouble with being poor is that it takes up all your time...")
- Alexander Chekhov ("The golden moments pass and leave no trace.")
- Four Quartets by T.S. Eliot, especially "East Coker" and "Little Gidding".
- Cicero ("O tempora, O mores.")
- "Poem 301" by Emily Dickinson.
- "The Nymph's Reply to the Shepherd" by Sir Walter Raleigh
- Revelations of Divine Love by Julian of Norwich ("All manner of things will be well...")
- Hamlet by William Shakespeare ("Good night, ladies. Good night, sweet ladies...")

=== Music ===
- Franz Liszt
- The Protecting Veil by John Tavener
- "Hooray for Hollywood", song from the film Hollywood Hotel
- "Dirty Old Town" performed by The Spinners
- "Keep The Home Fires Burning" (song)
- "Still I Love Him" (traditional) (sung by a young girl)
- "He Ain't Heavy, He's My Brother" recorded by The Hollies used over images of the Korean War
- "I was glad", heard during Elizabeth II's coronation ("Vivat Regina, Vivat Regina Elizabetha. Vivat! Vivat! Vivat!")
- "The Folks Who Live on the Hill" performed by Peggy Lee whilst showing images of the newly erected tower blocks
- The Beatles
- "Hippy Hippy Shake" performed by The Swinging Blue Jeans
- Elvis Presley
- Merseybeat
- Pearl Carr & Teddy Johnson
- Alma Cogan
- Lita Roza
- Dickie Valentine
- Anton Bruckner
- Gustav Mahler
- Dmitri Shostakovich
- Jean Sibelius
- Jussi Björling
- Wilhelm Furtwängler
- Aleksandr Gauk
- Otto Klemperer
- Hans Knappertsbusch
- Robert Merrill
- Gheorghe Popescu Branesti
- Charles Munch
- Anneliese Rothenberger
- Elisabeth Schwarzkopf
- Amy Shuard
- The Pearl Fishers, opera by Georges Bizet
- Victor Sylvester
- "Jesus Wants Me For A Sunbeam", Christian hymn

=== Films ===
- Singin' in the Rain
- Victim
- Seven Brides for Seven Brothers
- Young at Heart
- All That Heaven Allows

=== Fashion ===
- Coco Chanel
- Elsa Schiaparelli

=== Landmarks ===
- Liverpool Philharmonic Hall
- Aintree Racecourse
- Liverpool Metropolitan Cathedral of Christ the King
- St. George's Hall, Liverpool
- Sefton Park
- Liverpool Stadium
- River Mersey
- Liverpool Exchange railway station
- New Brighton Tower
- Royal Liver Building
- Cunard Building
- Port of Liverpool Building
- Burbo Bank Offshore Wind Farm

=== Nearby locales ===
- Salford, Greater Manchester
- New Brighton, Merseyside

=== Regular events ===
- Guy Fawkes Night
- The Twelfth
- May Day

=== Sports ===
- Accrington Stanley
- Sheffield
- Hamilton Academical
- Queen of the South
- Preston North End
- Blackpool
- Everton
- West Ham United
- Leicester City
- Leeds United
- Manchester United
- Grand National

=== Celebrities ===
- Kenneth Horne
- Gene Kelly
- Dirk Bogarde
- Bob Danvers-Walker
- Michael O'Hehir
- Peter O'Sullevan
- Bebe Daniels
- Ben Lyon
- Gregory Peck
- Greta Kukkonen
- Valerie Hobson
- John McCallum
- Margaret Lockwood
- Peter Sellers
- Lord Mayor of Birkenhead, Alderman Griffith Davies
- Petula Clark
- Lisa Daniely
- Christine Norden
- Richard Todd
- Jack Hawkins
- Paul Carpenter

=== Scholars ===
- Carl Jung
- Friedrich Engels

=== Radio programmes ===
- Julian and Sandy

=== Laws ===
- Sexual Offences Act 1956

=== Religious leaders ===
- John, Cardinal Heenan
- Pope Pius XII
- Pope John XXIII

=== Historical figures ===
- William III of England

=== Contemporary ===
- Hovis bread
- Bakelite radio

== Reception ==
The film was widely acclaimed, with praise mostly focusing on its warmth and heartfelt approach. It holds a 93% score on Rotten Tomatoes based on 59 critics’ reviews. On Metacritic, it holds an 81% critical score based on nine reviews.

It has been described as "a mesmerizing and eloquent essay" by Jonathan Rosenbaum of Chicago Reader, "a warm and extremely thoughtful journey, with a deliberately bare-bones narrative" by Peter Hartlaub of the San Francisco Chronicle, "a distinct pleasure to experience" by Kenneth Turan of the Los Angeles Times, "mesmerizing, visceral and heartfelt" by Geoff Pevere of the Toronto Star, "a short, beautiful, characteristically sublime memory piece" by Lisa Schwarzbaum of Entertainment Weekly, "a wistful, funny, satirical, angry and forgiving portrait" by Sean Axmaker of Parallax View, and "a visual poem" by Dennis Schwartz of Ozus' World Movie Reviews. In 2018, Mark Kermode chose it as his favourite film of the last ten years.

== People’s Stories - Liverpool’s social history website ==
In 2010 - 'in response' to the film - the website People’s Stories: Liverpool Lives was launched. With Heritage Lottery funding, the website was created for Of Time and the City producer Sol Papadopoulos by transmedia creator Krishna Stott. Stott described the project as 'a community-based site of user generated content for Liverpudlians and the scouse diaspora'. Actors Jonathan Pryce, Alexei Sayle and Joe McGann contributed their own memories of the city as part of the launch. The site was a place for members of the public to upload and share their stories, films, or photographs. Papadopoulos commented: 'We had Liverpudlians from all over the world wanting to tell their story, inspired by the way Terence had told his'.

== See also ==
- The Memories of Angels, a similarly constructed film about Montreal
