= The Neon Bible =

Book by John Kennedy Toole

- First edition cover
- Author: John Kennedy Toole
- Language: English
- Genre: Novel
- Publisher: Grove Press
- Publication date: May 1989
- Publication place: United States
- Media type: Print (hardback & paperback)
- ISBN: 0-8021-1108-4 (hardback edition) & ISBN 0-8021-3207-3 (trade paperback)
- OCLC: 18411432
- Dewey Decimal: 813/.54 19
- LC Class: PS3570.O54 N46 1989
- Preceded by: A Confederacy of Dunces (1981)

The Neon Bible is John Kennedy Toole's first novel, written at the age of 16. The novel is a bildungsroman about a callow youth named David in rural Mississippi during the late 1930s to early 1950s. He learns of religious, racial, social, and sexual bigotry in the narrator's ten strongest memories, one memory per chapter. The memories begin with David on a train, escaping the past, hoping for freedom. The book is told entirely in the first person.

== Plot summary ==
The story begins with Aunt Mae, a former actress and singer, moving in with David's white working-class family in the middle of a small southern town. Aunt Mae becomes sexually involved with a 70-year-old man, ending when he is arrested on morality charges. From subsequent events David learns he does not get along with the other boys his own age. At this point, suggestive of the Great Depression, David's father, Frank, loses his factory job. The family moves to an older house on a hill overlooking the town.

The family's circumstances worsen and Frank becomes frustrated. One week he spends his entire paycheck on seeds and other farming supplies. His wife insists that crops cannot grow in the clay of the hill soil. An argument ensues and he strikes her with his knee, knocking out one of her teeth. She bleeds badly, but it eventually subsides. Subsequently, Frank is shipped to Italy to fight in World War II.

While Frank is in Italy, a traveling 'revival' ministry visits town. The traveling preacher teaches that popular dance is a prelude to 'immorality'. The town's local preacher opposes this incursion and begins a rival Bible study class. These options divide the town. Through editorials in the newspaper and spots on the town radio station, each side attacks the other. Meanwhile, Aunt Mae takes a job in the local propeller factory as a supervisor. At a company dance which she organizes, Aunt Mae entertains by singing. This leads to her being invited to join the hired band, singing for pay.

David's mother goes insane after learning that Frank had been killed in Italy. She becomes uncommunicative, spending most of her time among the wild pines that have grown over Frank's failed crops, otherwise fixating her attention on a photograph of a graveyard that she received via telegram notifying her of Frank's death. David and Aunt Mae take care of her, as Aunt Mae pursues singing. At age 15, David gets a job at the pharmacy in town. There he encounters Jo Lynne, a girl visiting the valley while her grandfather is ill. After seeing a melodramatic movie, David and Jo Lynne kiss. Shortly thereafter, Jo Lynne abruptly leaves town when her grandfather recovers and angrily rejects David’s pleas to stay, leaving him confused and anguished.

Clyde, a member of Aunt Mae's band, is in love with her, and is certain they would get a record deal in Nashville. She leaves for Nashville, promising that she will immediately send for David and his mother. On strength of this promise, David quits his job. After seeing Aunt Mae off, he reflects on his situation. He does not know his mother's whereabouts, but assumes she is in the house since she is afraid to go out at night. He fixes himself dinner rather than searching the house for his mother. After eating, as he climbs the stairs he steps in blood. He finds his mother collapsed, bleeding profusely from her mouth. He picks her up and puts her into bed. The bleeding quells with the help of an old blanket, but it is too late. After some time, she dies, exhaling one last word — "Frank."

Immediately, the imperious local preacher arrives announcing he is taking David's mother to an asylum. David tells the preacher to leave, but the man is undaunted, and begins to charge up the stairs to get David's mother. David grabs his father's rifle and shoots the preacher through the back of the head, killing him. David then buries his mother in the yard and walks into town, using money given to him by the pharmacy owner, Mr. Williams, to board a train, hoping to start anew wherever he might be destined for.

== Publication ==
Like A Confederacy of Dunces, the novel had a long and difficult road to publication. The Neon Bible was written in 1954 for a contest after Toole's visit to a friend's family in rural Mississippi. But after he lost the contest, the novel was put aside and Toole gave up on writing long fiction for nine years before he eventually began work on Confederacy. Toole, describing the novel during correspondence with an editor he was pitching Confederacy to, wrote of it "In 1954, when I was 16, I wrote a book called The Neon Bible, a grim, adolescent, sociological attack upon the hatreds caused by the various Calvinist religions in the South—and the fundamentalist mentality is one of the roots of what was happening in Alabama, etc. The book, of course, was bad, but I sent it off a couple of times anyway." Toole committed suicide in 1969, leaving the unpublished manuscripts of A Confederacy of Dunces and The Neon Bible in the possession of Thelma Toole, his mother.

Louisiana's Napoleonic code-influenced inheritance law meant that these works technically belonged not only to Thelma Toole, but also to several other relatives on his father's side of the family. However, as the initial print run of Confederacy was only 2,500 copies (and was distributed by the small and non-mainstream Louisiana State University Press) no one figured that owning rights to the book would be especially profitable. Accordingly, Thelma Toole was able to convince these relatives to give up their rights to A Confederacy of Dunces.

When Confederacy became a Pulitzer Prize winner and a commercial success in 1981, the situation changed. Toole's relatives knew that if issued as a follow-up novel, The Neon Bible could bring in a substantial amount of money. Consequently, they refused to give up their shared rights to this novel. Meanwhile, Thelma Toole refused to have the novel published if it meant that large portions of the income it derived would go to these relatives.

Thelma Toole died in 1984, but instructed author W. Kenneth Holditch to act on her behalf and keep the book from being published even after her death. Although Holditch attempted to respect Thelma's wishes (even though he did not agree with them), the relatives eventually filed a formal lawsuit that would have put the book up for auction. Holditch knew that no matter how it was auctioned off, the outcome of the legal action would be that the book would be legally published. He therefore allowed The Neon Bible to see publication in 1989, before the "spectacle" of an auction could be held.

== Adaptations ==
In 1995 a movie of the book was released. The film The Neon Bible was directed by Terence Davies, with a screenplay by Davies based on Toole's novel. The cast includes Drake Bell, Leo Burmester, Denis Leary, Peter McRobbie, Gena Rowlands, Diana Scarwid, and Jacob Tierney.
