= The Neon Bible (film) =

- Directed by: Terence Davies
- Screenplay by: Terence Davies
- Based on: The Neon Bible by John Kennedy Toole
- Produced by: Elizabeth Karlsen; Nik Powell; Olivia Stewart; Victoria Westhead; Stephen Woolley
- Starring: Gena Rowlands; Denis Leary; Diana Scarwid; Jacob Tierney
- Cinematography: Michael Coulter
- Edited by: Charles Rees
- Distributed by: Strand Releasing
- Release dates: May 1995 (Cannes); 6 October 1995 (United Kingdom)
- Running time: 92 minutes
- Country: United Kingdom
- Language: English
- Box office: $78,072

The Neon Bible is a 1995 drama film written and directed by Terence Davies, based on the novel of the same name by John Kennedy Toole. The film is about a boy named David (Jacob Tierney) coming of age in Georgia in the 1940s. His abusive father (Denis Leary) enlists in the army during World War II and disappears, leaving David to take care of his mother (Diana Scarwid) with his Aunt Mae (Gena Rowlands), who is a singer. It was filmed in Atlanta, Crawfordville and Madison, Georgia.

The film was a selection of the 1995 Cannes Film Festival and the 1995 New York Film Festival.

== Cast ==
- Jacob Tierney as David, aged 15
  - Drake Bell as David, aged 10
- Gena Rowlands as Mae Morgan
- Diana Scarwid as Sarah
- Denis Leary as Frank
- Bob Hannah as George
- Aaron Frisch as Bruce
- Charles Franzen as Tannoy Voice
- Leo Burmester as Bobbie Lee Taylor
- Sherry Velvet as First Testifier
- Stephanie Astalos-Jones as Second Testifier
- Ian Shearer as Billy Sunday Thompson
- Joan Glover as Flora
- Jill Jane Clements as Woman
- Tom Turbiville as Clyde
- Sharon Blackwood as Schoolmistress
- Peter McRobbie as Reverend Watkins
- Ken Fight as Schoolmaster
- Dana Seltzer (credited as Dana Atwood) as Jo Lynne
- Virgil Graham Hopkins as Mr. Williams
- Ducan Stewart as Boy in Drugstore
- J.T. Alessi as Boy in Drugstore
- Duncan Stewart as Head Boy
- Frances Conroy as Miss Scover
- Marcus Batton as School Boy

== Reception ==
The film was entered into the 1995 Cannes Film Festival. San Francisco Chronicle film critic Edward Guthmann said the film was poorly received when it premiered at Cannes, but called it "gorgeous" and "one of the year's most beautiful films." He said it was a rewarding film that requires a little faith from the viewer due to long, slow, "lingering shots that work as a kind of meditation." He described the revival meeting at night "like an Edward Hopper or Thomas Hart Benton painting come to life." Judd Blaise of Allmovie gave the film 2½ out of 5 stars and said "Some viewers will likely be frustrated by the slow pace and elliptical style, though others may be transfixed by the often stunning photography and poetic approach." The New York Times film critic Stephen Holden said one of the problems with the film was that it "may have succumbed to its own dreamy esthetic" by focusing on the same image too often, and that the end of the film "loses its balance."

Stephen Brophy, a staff reporter for The Tech, said "Terence Davies' latest film looks as ravishing as Distant Voices, Still Lives, or The Long Day Closes... If it weren't for the absurdity of the climax and its lack of relevance to all that has gone before, The Neon Bible could be highly recommended. Too bad." San Francisco Examiner critic Barry Walters said the film was "unrelentingly downbeat" and that "it starts off dark and gets darker". He called it "one long crawl into an emotional abyss without catharsis" and said that Davies had created a nightmare.

Jonathan Rosenbaum wrote: "Davies doesn’t offer a cinema of plot or a cinema of ideas, but a cinema of raw feelings and incandescent moments that wash over you like waves. You might find some of these waves boring if you assume that each one has to make a separate point to justify its existence."

In an interview with Time Out Film, Davies said: "The Neon Bible doesn't work, and that's entirely my fault. The only thing I can say is that it's a transition work. And I couldn't have done The House of Mirth without it."

Shown on three screens in the United States, the film grossed $78,072 in its theatrical release.

On review aggregator website Rotten Tomatoes, the film holds an approval rating of 55% based on 11 reviews, with an average rating of 5.6/10.
