= A Confederacy of Dunces =

1980 novel by John Kennedy Toole

- First edition cover (1980), illustration by Ed Lindlof
- Author: John Kennedy Toole
- Language: English
- Genre: Black comedy, tragicomedy
- Published: 1980
- Publisher: Louisiana State University Press
- Publication place: United States
- Media type: Print (hardback & paperback), audiobook, e-book
- Pages: 405 (paperback)
- Award: Pulitzer Prize for Fiction (1981)
- ISBN: 0-8071-0657-7
- OCLC: 5336849
- Dewey Decimal: 813/.5/4
- LC Class: PS3570.O54 C66 1980

A Confederacy of Dunces is a picaresque novel by American novelist John Kennedy Toole. It was published in 1980, eleven years after Toole's death. Published through the efforts of writer Walker Percy (who also contributed a foreword) and Toole's mother, Thelma, the book became first a cult classic, then a mainstream success; it earned Toole a posthumous Pulitzer Prize for Fiction in 1981, and is now considered a canonical work of modern literature of the Southern United States.

The book's title refers to an epigram from Jonathan Swift's essay Thoughts on Various Subjects, Moral and Diverting: "When a true genius appears in the world, you may know him by this sign, that the dunces are all in confederacy against him."

A Confederacy of Dunces follows the misadventures of its protagonist, Ignatius J. Reilly, a lazy, overweight, misanthropic, self-styled scholar who lives at home with his mother. He is an educated but slothful 30-year-old man living in the Uptown neighborhood of early-1960s New Orleans who, in his quest for employment, has various adventures with colorful French Quarter characters.

Toole wrote the novel in 1963 during his last few months in Puerto Rico. It is hailed for its accurate depictions of New Orleans dialects. Toole based Reilly in part on his college professor friend Bob Byrne. Byrne's slovenly, eccentric behavior was anything but professorial, and Reilly mirrored him in these respects. The character was also based on Toole himself, and several personal experiences served as inspiration for passages in the novel. While at Tulane, Toole filled in for a friend at a job as a hot tamale cart vendor, and worked at a family owned and operated clothing factory. Both of these experiences were later adopted into his fiction.

== Plot ==
Ignatius J. Reilly is an overweight and unemployed thirty-year-old with a master's degree in Medieval History who lives with his mother in New Orleans. He utterly loathes the modern world, which he feels has lost the medieval values of "geometry and theology", and is fascinated with Boethius, feeling his life is influenced by Fortune's Wheel.

One afternoon Ignatius is waiting on the street for his mother. He is dressed in a green hunting cap, voluminous tweed trousers, a red plaid flannel shirt and a muffler. He is approached by policeman Angelo Mancuso, who has been ordered to round up "suspicious characters." Affronted and outraged, Ignatius protests his innocence to the crowd while denouncing the city's vices and the graft of the local police. An elderly man, Claude Robichaux, takes Ignatius' side, denouncing Officer Mancuso and the police as communists. Mrs. Reilly arrives and demands that Mancuso arrest Robichaux as the cause of the disturbance. In the resulting uproar, Ignatius and his mother escape, taking refuge in the Night of Joy, a bar and strip club, in case Officer Mancuso is still in pursuit.

At the police station Robichaux meets Burma Jones, a young black man who also was wrongly arrested, he claims, but seems resigned to his fate. The Sergeant tells Mancuso off for arresting Robichaux and punishes him for his uselessness by making him start to wear a different costume every day on the beat, beginning with a ballerina outfit.

At the Night of Joy the bar owner arrives and throws Ignatius and his mother out, saying they are bringing the tone of the place down. Mrs. Reilly has drunk too much. As a result, she crashes her car. The compensation she owes for the accident totals $1,020, a sizable amount of money in early 1960s New Orleans (equivalent to $10,900 in 2025). Ignatius is forced to work for the first time in many years in order to help his mother pay the debt.

At the police station, Jones is told he must get a job or be arrested for vagrancy. He reluctantly starts work as a janitor at the Night of Joy. The owner can get away with paying him below the minimum wage because Jones knows if he loses the job, he will be put in jail. Still, Jones continually protests his ill treatment, threatens retaliation, and keeps an eye out for an opportunity to sabotage the business.

Darlene, the bar hostess, has an ambition to perform there as a stripper, and has devised an act involving her pet cockatoo. She has trained the cockatoo to pull off rings that hold her costume together.

Ignatius answers an ad for a position in the office at the Levy Pants factory, run by an absentee but henpecked Gus Levy. Here he performs no useful work, but does arbitrarily throw away several entire file cabinet drawers full of important files. He sends an insulting letter to a complaining customer on official stationery over the owner's signature. He carries out a regular and aggressive correspondence with his college friend Myrna Minkoff in New York. She criticizes his self-centered lifestyle and urges him to join her in radical political agitation. To impress Myrna, Ignatius tries (unsuccessfully) to incite the black workforce at the pants factory into a violent demonstration for better pay.

Dismissed from this job, he chances into employment pushing a hot dog cart. He makes few sales and spends most of his time consuming the stock himself. His boss insists that he wear a pirate outfit to try to entice trade from tourists in the French Quarter.

Ignatius gets the idea to bring about universal peace by infiltrating the U.S. military (and eventually foreign militaries) with gay soldiers who will be too busy tailoring and socializing to fight. To this end, and again to impress Myrna, he attends a wild gay party in the French Quarter (wearing his pirate outfit) looking to recruit members for his new political party, but when he begins to harangue the guests he is thrown out.

He arrives at the Night of Joy to find Jones at the door dressed as a plantation slave and Darlene about to have her opening night stripping as a Southern Belle character. Jones urges him in, hoping that trouble will ensue. When Darlene takes to the stage her cockatoo spies the gold pirate earring dangling from Ignatius’s ear and flies at it, causing chaos. Ignatius spills out into the street and Jones rescues him from being hit by a passing bus. Ignatius faints in the street. Mancuso arrests the Night of Joy's owner for pornography.

After the front page of the newspaper features embarrassing photos of that scandalous evening, Ignatius's mother has had enough and secretly phones for an ambulance to take him away to the mental hospital.

As the novel nears its end, Fortune's Wheel turns. Darlene is offered a new job due to the sensation, Gus Levy is vindicated against his berating wife, Levy and Ignatius both escape the consequences of Ignatius's insulting letter, Jones is slated for a philanthropic award, and Officer Mancuso is vindicated for his detective work. Myrna arrives at Ignatius's door, having driven from New York to rescue him from his lifestyle. Ignatius, having guessed his mother's plot to institutionalize him, urges Myrna to drive him away right then, and on the road they pass the ambulance coming to take him away.

== Major characters ==
=== Ignatius J. Reilly ===
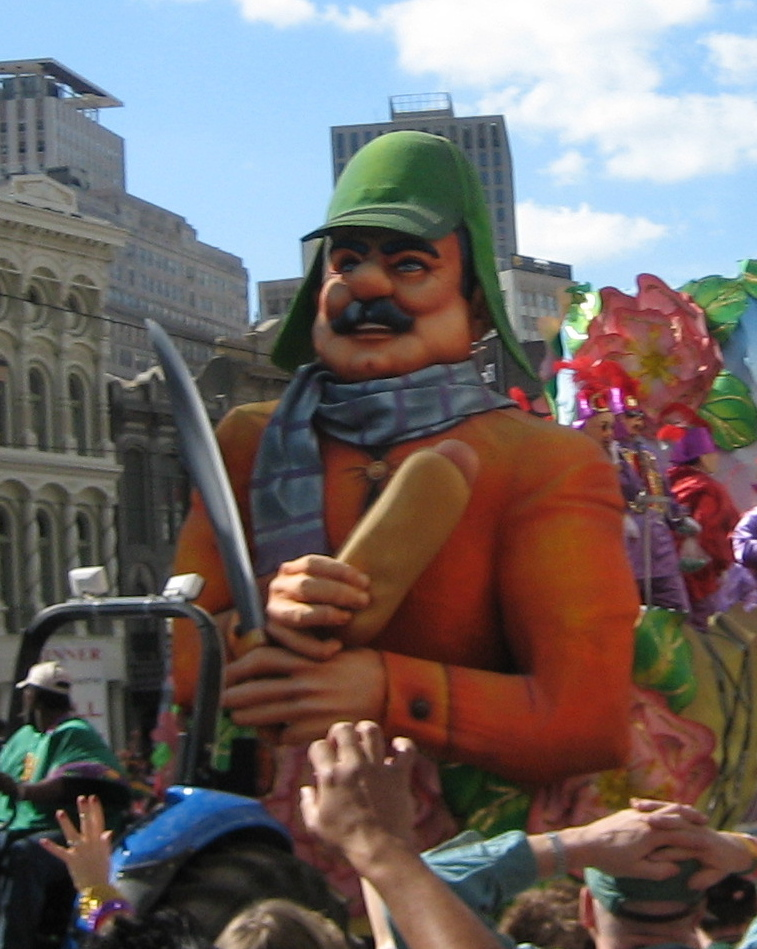
Rex Parade Float of Ignatius Reilly commemorating "The Confederacy of Dunces"

Ignatius Jacques Reilly is something of a modern Don Quixote—eccentric, idealistic, and creative, sometimes to the point of delusion. In his foreword to the book, Walker Percy describes Ignatius as a "slob extraordinary, a mad Oliver Hardy, a fat Don Quixote, a perverse Thomas Aquinas rolled into one". He disdains modernity, particularly pop culture. The disdain becomes his obsession: he goes to movies in order to mock their perversity and express his outrage with the contemporary world's lack of "theology and geometry". He prefers the scholastic philosophy of the Middle Ages, and the early medieval philosopher Boethius in particular. However, he also enjoys many modern comforts and conveniences and is given to claiming that the rednecks of rural Louisiana hate all modern technology, which they associate with unwanted change. The workings of his pyloric valve play an important role in his life, reacting strongly to incidents in a fashion that he likens to Cassandra in prophetic significance.

Ignatius is of the mindset that he does not belong in the world and that his numerous failings are the work of some higher power. He continually refers to the goddess Fortuna as having spun him downwards on her wheel of fortune. Ignatius loves to eat, and his masturbatory fantasies lead in strange directions. His mockery of obscene images is portrayed as a defensive posture to hide their titillating effect on him. Although considering himself to have an expansive and learned worldview, Ignatius has an aversion to ever leaving the town of his birth, and frequently bores friends and strangers with the story of his sole, abortive journey out of New Orleans, a trip to Baton Rouge on a Greyhound Scenicruiser bus, which Ignatius recounts as a traumatic ordeal of extreme horror.

Ignatius is portrayed as a monstrously overgrown, overeducated child: self-centered, impulsive, rebellious, mostly asexual, an extravagant daydreamer who is given to wearing a Mickey Mouse watch, reading comic books, writing in crayon, making crude arts and crafts projects, and gorging himself on doughnuts and hot dogs.

=== Myrna Minkoff ===
Myrna Minkoff, referred to by Ignatius as "that minx," is a Jewish beatnik from New York City, whom Ignatius met while she was in college in New Orleans. Though their political, social, religious, and personal orientations could hardly be more different, Myrna and Ignatius fascinate one another. The novel repeatedly refers to Myrna and Ignatius having engaged in tag-team attacks on the teachings of their college professors. For most of the novel, she is seen only in the regular correspondence which the two sustain since her return to New York, a correspondence heavily weighted with psychosexual analysis from Myrna and Ignatius's contempt for her bohemian activism. Officially, each deplores everything the other stands for. Though neither of them will admit it, their correspondence indicates that, separated though they are by 1,300 miles, many of their actions are meant to impress one another.

=== Irene Reilly ===
Mrs. Irene Reilly is the mother of Ignatius. She has been widowed for 21 years. At first, she allows Ignatius his space and drives him where he needs to go; however, over the course of the novel she learns to stand up for herself. She also has a drinking problem, most frequently indulging in muscatel, although Ignatius exaggerates that she is a raving, abusive drunk.

She is courted by Claude Robichaux, a dim but fairly well-off man with a railroad pension and rental properties. At the end of the novel, she decides she will marry Claude. But first, she agrees with Santa Battaglia (who has not only recently become Mrs. Reilly's new best friend, but also harbors an intense dislike for Ignatius) that Ignatius is insane and arranges to have him sent to a mental hospital.

=== Others ===
- Santa Battaglia, a "grammaw" who is friends with Mrs. Reilly and has a marked disdain for Ignatius
- Claude Robichaux, an old man constantly on the lookout for any "communiss" who might infiltrate the United States; he takes an interest in protecting Irene
- Angelo Mancuso, an inept police officer, the nephew of Santa Battaglia, who, after an abortive attempt to arrest Ignatius as a "suspicious character," features prominently in the novel as Ignatius's self-perceived nemesis
- the Sergeant, Mancuso's belittling supervisor, who requires Mancuso to wear ridiculous disguises and go looking for suspicious characters to arrest
- Lana Lee, a fiery and abusive owner who runs the "Night of Joy", a downscale French Quarter strip club, and who secretly doubles as a pornographic model
- George, Lana's distributor and accomplice, a young dropout who sells photographs of her to high-school children
- Darlene, a goodhearted but none-too-bright bar girl, who aspires to be a "Night of Joy" stripper with a pet cockatoo
- Burma Jones, an irascible black janitor for the "Night of Joy" who holds on to his below-minimum wage job only to avoid being arrested for vagrancy
- Mr. Clyde, the frustrated owner of Paradise Vendors, a hot dog vendor business, who inadvisedly employs Ignatius as a vendor
- Gus Levy, the reluctant, mostly absentee owner of Levy Pants, an inherited family business in the Bywater neighborhood where Ignatius briefly works
- Mrs. Levy, Gus's henpecking wife, who attempts to psychoanalyze her husband and Miss Trixie despite being completely unqualified to do so
- Miss Trixie, an aged clerk at Levy Pants who suffers from dementia and compulsive hoarding
- Mr. Gonzalez, the meek office manager at Levy Pants
- Dorian Greene, a flamboyant French Quarter homosexual from the Midwest who puts on elaborate parties
- Frieda Club, Betty Bumper, and Liz Steele, a trio of aggressive lesbians living in Dorian's building who spar with Mancuso and with Ignatius
- Dr. Talc, a mediocre professor at Tulane who had the misfortune of teaching Myrna and Ignatius
- Miss Annie, the disgruntled neighbor of the Reillys who professes an addiction to headache medicine

== Ignatius at the movies ==
Toole provides comical descriptions of two of the films Ignatius watches without naming them; they can be recognized as Billy Rose's Jumbo and That Touch of Mink, both Doris Day features released in 1962. In another passage, Ignatius declines to see another film, a "widely praised Swedish drama about a man who was losing his soul". This is most likely Ingmar Bergman's Winter Light, released in early 1963. In another passage, Irene Reilly recalls the night Ignatius was conceived: after she and her husband viewed Red Dust, released in October 1932.

== Confederacy and New Orleans ==
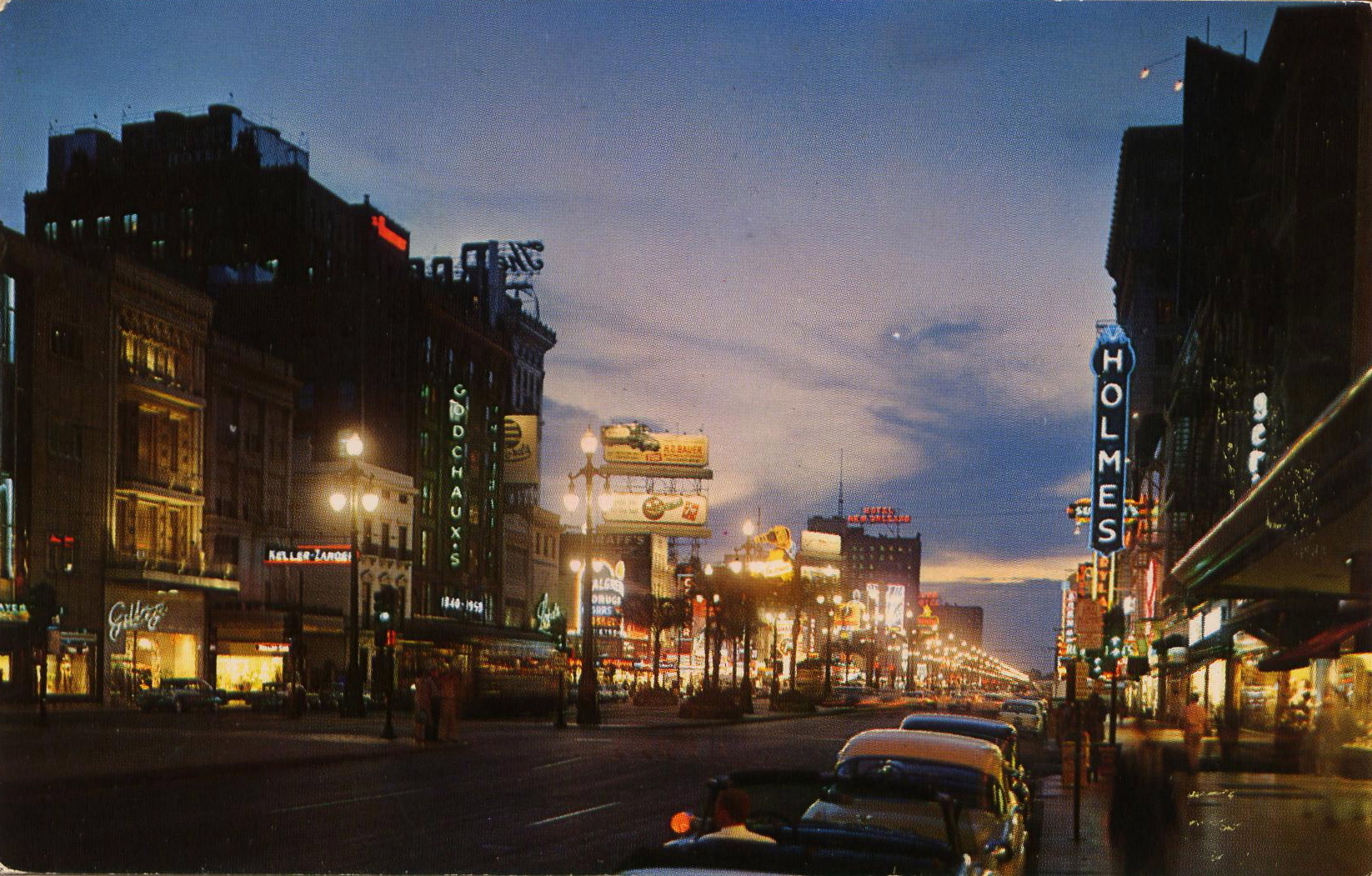
Canal Street, New Orleans in the late 1950s; the D. H. Holmes store at right

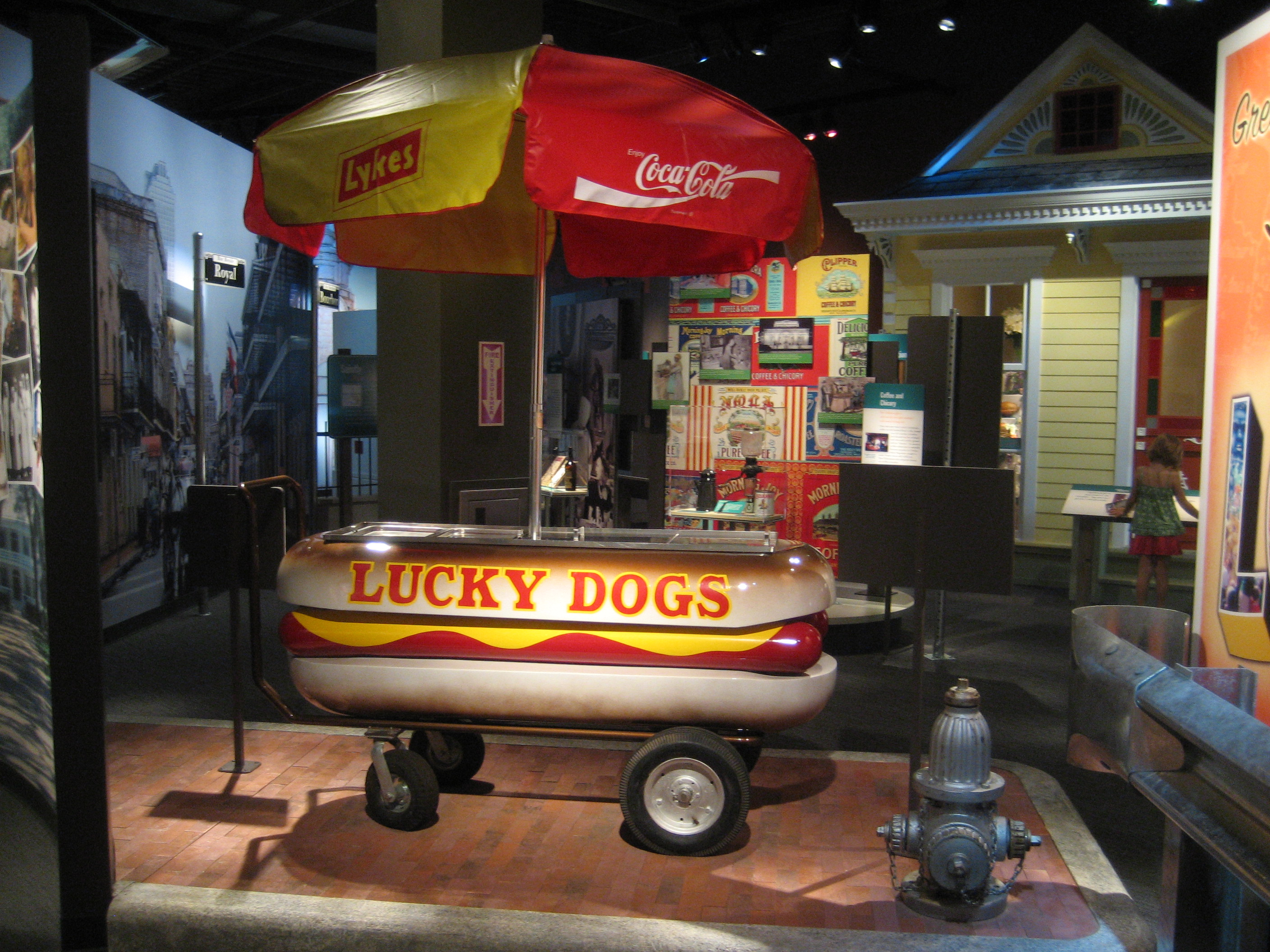
A "Lucky Dogs" cart from the era of the novel

The book is famous for its rich depiction of New Orleans and the city's dialects, including Yat. Many locals and writers think that it is the best and most accurate depiction of the city in a work of fiction.

A bronze statue of Ignatius J. Reilly is located under the clock on the down-river side of the 800 block of Canal Street, New Orleans, the former site of the D. H. Holmes Department Store, now the Hyatt French Quarter Hotel. The statue mimics the opening scene: Ignatius waits for his mother under the D.H. Holmes clock, clutching a Werlein's shopping bag, dressed in a hunting cap, flannel shirt, baggy pants and scarf, 'studying the crowd of people for signs of bad taste.' The statue is modeled on New Orleans actor John "Spud" McConnell, who portrayed Ignatius in a stage version of the novel.

Various local businesses are mentioned in addition to D. H. Holmes, including Werlein's Music Store and local cinemas such as the Prytania Theater. Some readers from elsewhere assume Ignatius's favorite soft drink, Dr. Nut, to be fictitious, but it was an actual local soft drink brand of the era. The "Paradise Hot Dogs" vending carts are an easily recognized satire of those actually branded "Lucky Dogs".

== Structure ==
The structure of A Confederacy of Dunces reflects the structure of Ignatius's favorite book, Boethius' The Consolation of Philosophy. Like Boethius' book, A Confederacy of Dunces is divided into chapters that are further divided into a varying number of subchapters. Key parts of some chapters are outside of the main narrative. In Consolation, sections of narrative prose alternate with metrical verse. In Confederacy, such narrative interludes vary more widely in form and include light verse, journal entries by Ignatius, and also letters between himself and Myrna. A copy of The Consolation of Philosophy within the narrative itself also becomes an explicit plot device in several ways.

== The difficult path to publication ==
As outlined in the introduction to a later revised edition, the book would never have been published if Toole's mother had not found a smeared carbon copy of the manuscript left in the house following Toole's 1969 death at 31. She was persistent and tried several different publishers, to no avail.

Thelma repeatedly called Walker Percy, an author and college instructor at Loyola University New Orleans, to demand for him to read it. He initially resisted; however, as he recounts in the book's foreword:

...the lady was persistent, and it somehow came to pass that she stood in my office handing me the hefty manuscript. There was no getting out of it; only one hope remained—that I could read a few pages and that they would be bad enough for me, in good conscience, to read no farther. Usually I can do just that. Indeed the first paragraph often suffices. My only fear was that this one might not be bad enough, or might be just good enough, so that I would have to keep reading. In this case I read on. And on. First with the sinking feeling that it was not bad enough to quit, then with a prickle of interest, then a growing excitement, and finally an incredulity: surely it was not possible that it was so good.

The book was published by LSU Press in 1980. It won the Pulitzer Prize for Fiction in 1981. In 2005, Blackstone Audio released an unabridged audiobook of the novel, read by Barrett Whitener.

While Tulane University in New Orleans retains a collection of Toole's papers, and some early drafts have been found, the location of the original manuscript is unknown.

== Adaptations ==
In March 1984, LSU staged a musical adaptation of the book, with book and lyrics by Frank Galati and music by Edward Zelnis; actor Scott Harlan played Ignatius.

Kerry Shale read the book for BBC Radio 4's Book at Bedtime in 1982, and later adapted the book into a one-man show which he performed at the Adelaide Festival in 1990, at the Gate Theatre in London, and for BBC Radio.

There have been repeated attempts to turn the book into a film. In 1982, Harold Ramis was to write and direct an adaptation, starring John Belushi as Ignatius and Richard Pryor as Burma Jones, but Belushi's death prevented this. Later, John Candy and Chris Farley were touted for the lead, but both of them, like Belushi, also died at an early age, leading many to ascribe a curse to the role of Ignatius.

Director John Waters was interested in directing an adaptation that would have starred Divine, who also died at an early age, as Ignatius.

British performer and writer Stephen Fry was at one point commissioned to adapt Toole's book for the screen. He was sent to New Orleans by Paramount Studios in 1997 to get background for a screenplay adaptation.

John Goodman, a longtime resident of New Orleans, was slated to play Ignatius at one point.

A version adapted by Steven Soderbergh and Scott Kramer, and slated to be directed by David Gordon Green, was scheduled for release in 2005. The film was to star Will Ferrell as Ignatius and Lily Tomlin as Irene. A staged reading of the script took place at the 8th Nantucket Film Festival, with Ferrell as Ignatius, Anne Meara as Irene, Paul Rudd as Officer Mancuso, Kristen Johnston as Lana Lee, Mos Def as Burma Jones, Rosie Perez as Darlene, Olympia Dukakis as Santa Battaglia and Miss Trixie, Natasha Lyonne as Myrna, Alan Cumming as Dorian Greene, John Shea as Gonzales, Jesse Eisenberg as George, John Conlon as Claude Robichaux, Jace Alexander as Bartender Ben, Celia Weston as Miss Annie, Miss Inez & Mrs. Levy, and Dan Hedaya as Mr. Levy.

Various reasons are cited as to why the Soderbergh version never made it to production. They include disorganization and lack of interest at Paramount Pictures, Helen Hill the head of the Louisiana State Film Commission being murdered, and the devastating effects of Hurricane Katrina on New Orleans. When asked why the film was never made, Will Ferrell has said it is a "mystery". In a 2013 interview, Soderbergh remarked "I think it's cursed. I'm not prone to superstition, but that project has got bad mojo on it."

In 2012, there was a version in negotiation with director James Bobin and potentially starring Zach Galifianakis.

In November 2015, the Huntington Theatre Company introduced a stage version of A Confederacy of Dunces written by Jeffrey Hatcher in their Avenue of the Arts/BU Theatre location in Boston, starring Nick Offerman as Ignatius J. Reilly. It set a record as the company's highest-grossing production.

The 2025 film Nirvanna the Band the Show the Movie was originally conceived as an adaptation of A Confederacy of Dunces. After more than a month of filming in New Orleans, director Matt Johnson determined that the film wasn't working and decided to scrap all previously shot footage, reworking the film into a time-travel story set in Toronto. The unused material is planned to be reworked into season three of Nirvanna the Band the Show.

In 2026, Archaia, an imprint of Boom! Studios, published A Confederacy of Dunces: A Graphic Novel Adaptation, a 240-page comic version of the novel by Spanish cartoonist Albert Monteys, who had previously adapted Kurt Vonnegut's Slaughterhouse-Five. Released on 29 September 2026, it is the first sustained visual adaptation of the book, after decades of stalled film attempts. Monteys reworks some characters, making Irene Reilly more sympathetic, for example, while Ignatius remains largely faithful to the original.

== Critical reception ==
On November 5, 2019, the BBC News included A Confederacy of Dunces on its list of the 100 most inspiring novels. It is sometimes considered one of the funniest American novels ever written.

== See also ==
- List of works published posthumously
- Development hell
