= John Kennedy Toole =

American novelist (1937–1969)

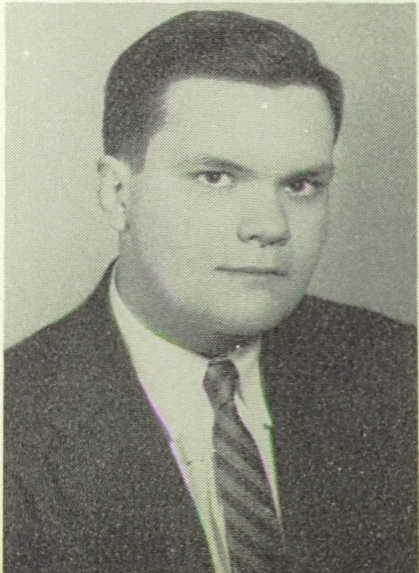
- Toole in 1954
- Born: December 17, 1937; New Orleans, Louisiana, U.S.
- Died: March 26, 1969 (aged 31); Biloxi, Mississippi, U.S.
- Education: Tulane University (BA); Columbia University
- Occupation: Author
- Writing career
- Notable work: A Confederacy of Dunces (1980)
- Notable awards: Pulitzer Prize (1981)

John Kennedy Toole (/ˈtuːl/; December 17, 1937 – March 26, 1969) was an American novelist from New Orleans, Louisiana, whose posthumously published novel, A Confederacy of Dunces, won the Pulitzer Prize for Fiction in 1981. At 16 in 1954, he wrote his first novel, The Neon Bible, which he shelved in the same year, not finding a willing publisher; he later dismissed it as "adolescent". Toole was a successful and popular professor, first at University of Southwestern Louisiana (now University of Louisiana at Lafayette), then Hunter College, and finally St. Mary's Dominican College in New Orleans. Having persuaded Simon & Schuster to accept A Confederacy of Dunces, he was unable to resolve editorial disputes. Due in part to the novel's failure, he suffered from paranoia and depression, dying by suicide at the age of 31.

Toole was born to a middle-class family in New Orleans. From a young age, his mother, Thelma, taught him an appreciation of culture. She was thoroughly involved in his affairs for most of his life, and at times they had a difficult relationship. With his mother's encouragement, Toole became a stage performer at the age of 10 doing comic impressions and acting.

On an academic scholarship, Toole received his bachelor's degree from Tulane University in New Orleans. He then earned an MA in English literature at Columbia University in New York. He returned to Columbia in pursuit of a PhD. While at Columbia, he taught at Hunter College. He also taught in Louisiana. During the early part of his academic career, his colleagues valued his wit and gift for mimicry, which he displayed at parties. His studies were interrupted when he was drafted into the Army, where he taught English to Spanish-speaking recruits in San Juan, Puerto Rico. After receiving a promotion, he used his private office to begin writing A Confederacy of Dunces, which he finished at his parents' home after his discharge.

Toole submitted A Confederacy of Dunces to publisher Simon & Schuster, where it reached editor Robert Gottlieb. Gottlieb considered Toole quite talented, but did not regard the book's themes and conflicts as sufficiently meaningful, or culminating in a unified end. Despite several revisions, Gottlieb remained unsatisfied, and after the book was rejected by another literary figure, Hodding Carter Jr., Toole shelved the novel. Suffering from depression and feelings of persecution, Toole left home on a journey around the country. He stopped in Biloxi, Mississippi where he died by suicide; he ran a garden hose from the car exhaust into the car window. After his death, his mother brought the manuscript of A Confederacy of Dunces to the attention of novelist Walker Percy, who was crucial in the book's publication. In 1981, Toole was posthumously awarded the Pulitzer Prize for Fiction.

== Early life ==
Toole was born to John Dewey Toole Jr. and Thelma Ducoing Toole. Kennedy was the name of Thelma's grandmother. The first of the Creole Ducoing family arrived in Louisiana from France in the early 19th century, and the Tooles immigrated to America from Ireland during the Great Famine of the 1840s. Toole's father worked as a car salesman, and his mother, forced to give up her teaching job when she married (as was the custom at the time and place), gave private lessons in music, speech, and dramatic expression. Toole was known to friends and family as "Ken" until the final few months of his life, when he insisted on being called John. As a child, Toole had an intense affection for his black nursemaid Beulah Matthews, who cared for him when his parents were both working.

Toole's highly cultured mother was a controlling woman, especially with her son. His father was less involved and sometimes complained of his lack of influence in their child's upbringing. Despite this, he and his father bonded through a shared interest in baseball and cars. Toole's mother chose the friends he could associate with, and felt his cousins on his father's side were too common for him to be around. Toole received high marks in elementary school and, from a young age, expressed a desire to excel academically. He skipped ahead a grade, from first to second, after taking an IQ test at the age of six, and would also eventually skip the fourth grade.

When Toole was ten, his mother gathered a group of child stage entertainers she named the Junior Variety Performers. The troupe, with Toole as its star, consisted of 50 children of varying skills and ages. While the troupe was well-received, Toole also engaged in other entertainment ventures, such as playing the lead in three productions of the Children's Workshop Theatre of New Orleans, emceeing a radio show called Telekids, modeling for newspaper ads, and developing a solo show of comic impersonations entitled Great Lovers of the World.

An excellent student, Toole curtailed his stage work when he entered high school (Alcée Fortier High). He concentrated on his academic work. Toole wrote for the school newspaper Silver and Blue, worked on the yearbook The Tarpon, and won several essay contests on subjects such as the Louisiana Purchase and the American Merchant Marine. He took up debating, a skill his father had used to win the state debate championship in high school. Toole spoke at gatherings of civic organizations such as Kiwanis and Rotary Clubs. Toole's father bought him an Oldsmobile, in which Toole delivered newspapers at the age of 13, despite the legal driving age being 15. In high school, Toole spent a lot of time at the home of classmate Larry McGee, and dated McGee's sister, Jane. Jane later said that Toole never wanted to go home and would purposely spend almost all of his free time at the McGees'. With the McGees, Toole would engage in mischievous pranks and go on double dates with Larry and his girlfriend, Buzz. The couples spent their free time at the local pool or cruising in Toole's car.

As a teenager in 1954, Toole made his first trip out of Louisiana. On a field trip, he visited Philadelphia, New York City, and Washington, D.C. He especially enjoyed New York and filled a cherished scrapbook with pictures from his visit, which included trips on the New York City Subway, an excursion on a boat in the New York Harbor, and visits to the Statue of Liberty, Chinatown, and Times Square; he also enjoyed a performance of The Rockettes at the Radio City Music Hall and brought home a program.

Toole became the editor of the news section of the school newspaper, and maintained high marks throughout high school. He received many awards, including a National Merit Scholarship, selection to the National Honor Society, and being named the Most Intelligent Senior Boy by the student body. He was one of two New Orleanians voted outstanding citizen at the Pelican (now Louisiana) Boys State convention and he was invited back to serve the following year as a counsellor. He also took part in the Newman Club, a Catholic organization for teenagers, where he won an award for outstanding student in the group. He received a full scholarship to Tulane University at age 17.

During his senior year, Toole wrote The Neon Bible, a short Southern Gothic novel that has been compared in style to Flannery O'Connor, a favorite author of Toole's. The book's protagonist, David, had lived with his family in a "little white house in town that had a real roof you could sleep under when it rained," before his father lost his job, forcing the family into a small shoddily built home. Set in 1940s Mississippi, the backwoods Baptist community setting is similar to a location to which Toole had traveled with a high-school friend for a literary contest. The novel's sudden outburst of violence at the end has been described as incongruous with what preceded it.

Toole later described the novel in correspondence with an editor, "In 1954, when I was 16, I wrote a book called The Neon Bible, a grim, adolescent, sociological attack upon the hatreds caused by the various Calvinist religions in the South—and the fundamentalist mentality is one of the roots of what was happening in Alabama, etc. The book, of course, was bad, but I sent it off a couple of times anyway." Neon Bible failed to attract interest from publishers and did not appear in print until after Toole's death.

== College studies and professorships ==
In high school, Toole, as editor of the school newspaper, had written, under a pseudonym, a column of gossip and wit, Fish Tales, and while at Tulane he worked on the college newspaper, the Hullabaloo, writing articles, reviewing books, and drawing cartoons. The cartoons were noted for their subtlety and sophistication. At Tulane he first majored in engineering on the recommendation of his father; however, after a few weeks, he changed his major to English, explaining to his mother, "I'm losing my culture." Around this time, Toole began associating with a local blues band that performed at high schools, in the French Quarter, and in the Irish Channel. Because Toole's classmates and family looked down on the French Quarter as being for tourists and the Irish Channel as a place for lowlifes, Toole kept his trips to those places a secret. His closest friend was guitarist Don Stevens, nicknamed "Steve Cha-Cha," with whom he bonded over their shared love of blues music and Beat poets. Stevens also had a side job pushing a hot tamale cart around town and, on days when he was unavailable for work, Toole would fill in for him. According to Stevens's bandmate Sidney Snow, Toole loved eating the tamales. Toole later used these experiences as material for his novel A Confederacy of Dunces, whose protagonist Ignatius J. Reilly pushes a hot dog cart around town, usually eating most of the profits. Also, like Reilly, Toole later worked at a family business that manufactured men's clothing, Haspel Brothers. He worked for J. B. Tonkel, who married one of the Haspel daughters. "Ken watched the Haspels' business dealings with great interest, absorbing and remembering their troubles and intrigues," and he later constructed the similar Levy Pants Company in A Confederacy of Dunces, with Gus Levy and his wife becoming significant supporting characters in the novel.

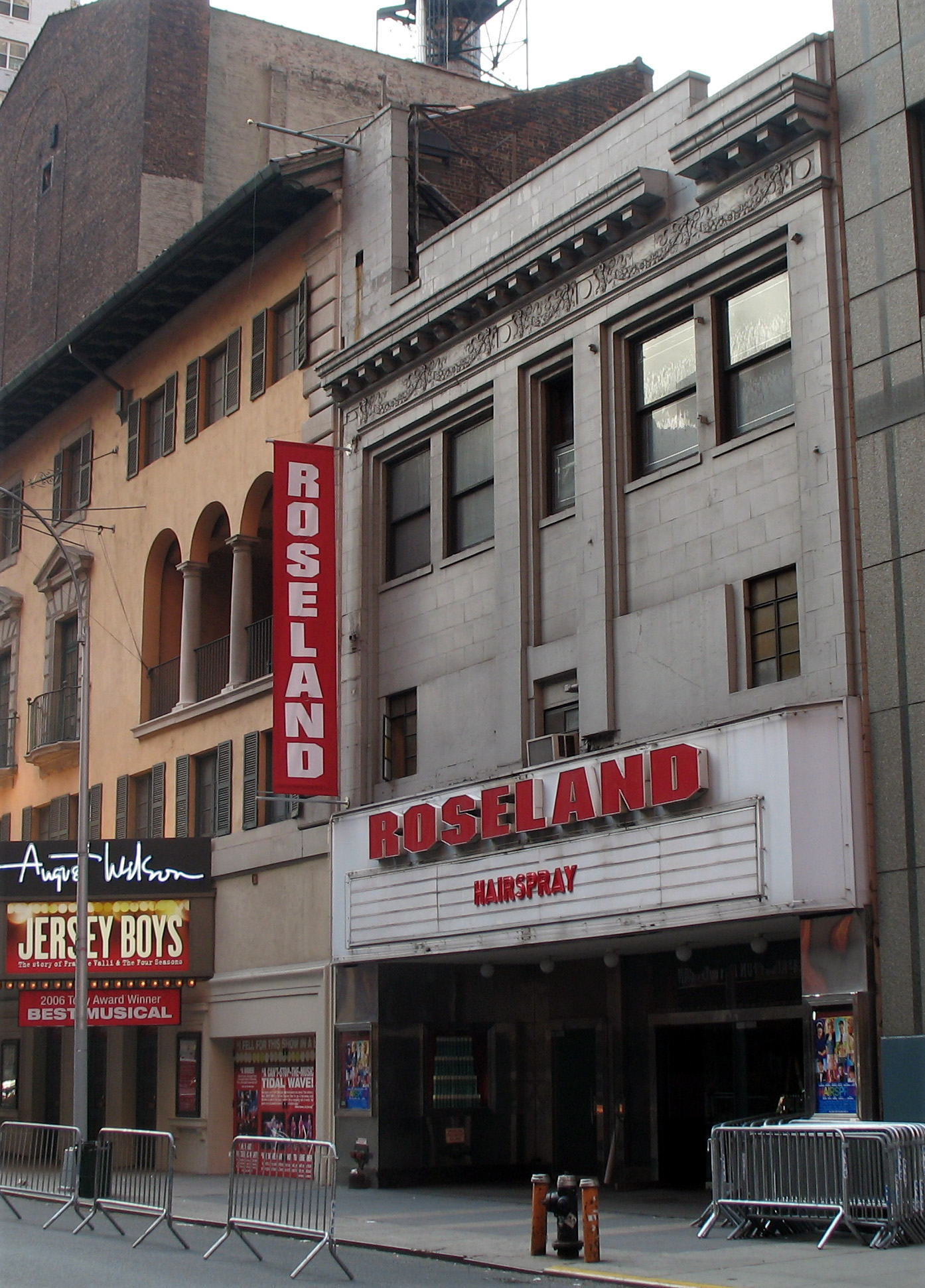
While studying at Columbia University in New York City, one of Toole's favorite activities was dancing at the Roseland Ballroom with girlfriend Ruth Kathmann. For $2.00 they could dance to big band music all night.

In 1958, Toole graduated from Tulane with honors. He enrolled in Columbia University in New York on a Woodrow Wilson Fellowship to study English literature. He took on a heavy workload so that he could earn his master's degree in a single year. In his free time he dated Ruth Kathmann, another student from Tulane, who was studying journalism at Columbia. The couple would go dancing at the Roseland Ballroom, as the $2.00 entrance fee allowed them to dance all night and suited their limited budget. Toole was considered a talented dancer. There is some question as to whether they were engaged, with friends claiming they were but Kathmann saying only that Toole asked her to marry him, but she declined. After he returned to New Orleans they rarely saw each other, and she married another man. Toole wrote his master's essay on the Elizabethan poet John Lyly, which was made easier by the fact that he had also written his honors thesis at Tulane on Lyly.

Toole returned home in 1959 to spend a year as assistant professor of English at the University of Southwestern Louisiana (USL), since renamed the University of Louisiana at Lafayette. Joel L. Fletcher, a close friend, noted, "Ken has a real gift for mimicry and a refined sense of the absurd ... the English faculty at USL, which is divided into several camps of war, both fear and court Ken because of his biting comic talent." This year is generally considered one of the happiest of his life. While at USL he rented a dilapidated apartment from an elderly and eccentric widow on Convent Street. Toole described the apartment as a "Conradian metaphor" to friends.

Toole was in constant demand and went to all the parties where it was said "he was encouraged and sometimes forced to perform, Ken would enter a room armed with quiver full of sharp stories and barbed one-liners. He would zing these out until his audience was weak with laughter, though he hadn't cracked a smile." Because he was saving for a return to Columbia to get his PhD, Toole was a notorious skinflint during his year at USL. His friends noticed this and forced him to pay for and throw a party at his home. The party was a success and generally considered the best party thrown that year. In contrast to this image of an outgoing, lively young man, when Toole's mother came to visit, friends noticed that he became sullen and withdrawn. His friend Pat Rickels commented that Thelma "was absolutely convinced that he was without flaw and that all the hopes of the world lay in him. It was an extreme form of maternalism, where all your pride and all your hopes are in one person. He had to grow up with that burden. She was a very ostentatious, shrill, loud-voiced, bossy, bragging woman."

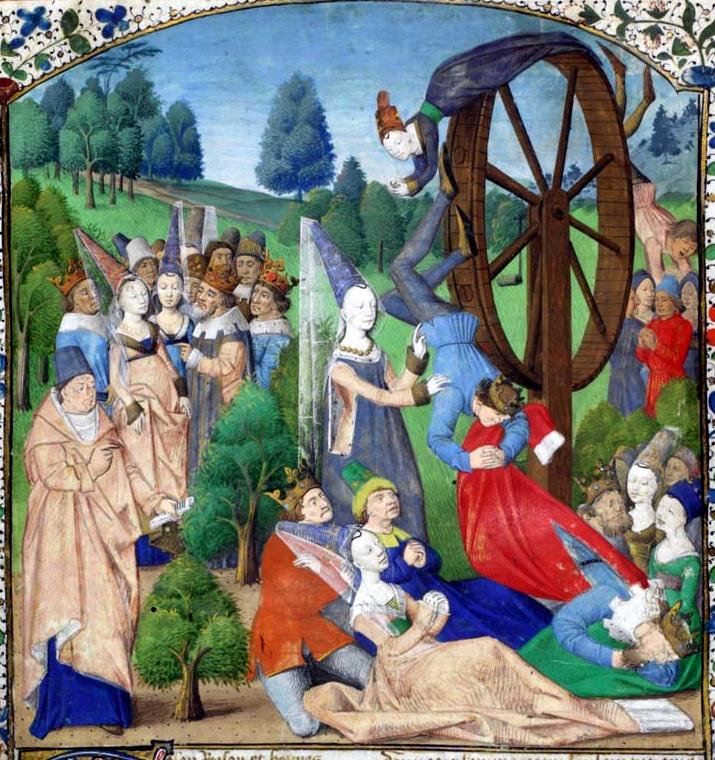
Fortuna with the Wheel of Fortune from a medieval manuscript of a work by Boccaccio. Fortuna, as interpreted by Boethius in his Consolation of Philosophy, was a favorite subject of Toole's A Confederacy of Dunces protagonist Ignatius J. Reilly.

It was at USL that Toole met Bob Byrne, an eccentric English professor who is considered one of the primary inspirations for the character of Ignatius J. Reilly. Byrne specialized in the medieval period, and he and Toole frequently discussed the philosopher Boethius and the wheel of Fortuna, as described in Boethius's Consolation of Philosophy. Boethius was the favorite philosopher of Ignatius J. Reilly, who frequently referred to Fortuna and Consolation of Philosophy. Like Ignatius, Byrne was a self-admitted devoted slob who played the lute, and also wore a deerstalker hunting cap, which Toole frequently chided him about.

When he was not studying or on the faculty party circuit, Toole frequented country bars and drank beer. He would usually listen to singer Frances Faye, whom he had once heard perform in New York. On several occasions while listening to her music with friends he enigmatically remarked, "Is Frances Faye God?" He was also an avid fan of Marilyn Monroe. Toole was devastated by her death. He once described his interest in her as having "reached the stage of obsession."

In May 1960, Toole accepted a three-year fellowship to study for a PhD in Renaissance literature at the University of Washington at Seattle. However, when he was offered a teaching position at Hunter College in New York, which suited his desire to study at Columbia, he chose Hunter instead. At 22, he became the youngest professor in Hunter's history. Although he pursued a doctorate at Columbia, he became unhappy with his PhD. He, however, wrote to Fletcher that he still liked Hunter, "principally because the aggressive, pseudo-intellectual, 'liberal' girl students are continuously amusing." Fletcher surmised that based on these girls, he created the character Myrna Minkoff for A Confederacy of Dunces. Toole, although generally only a "Christmas-and-Easter churchgoer," had some apprehension about the anti-Catholic intellectualism of some of his students, and about their seeming ever watchful for a cause they could throw their liberal zeal behind. "Every time the elevator door opens at Hunter, you are confronted by 20 pairs of burning eyes, 20 sets of bangs and everyone waiting for someone to push a Negro," he is reported to have said. When he first arrived back in New York, Toole dated Emilie Dietrich Griffin, another Louisiana transplant, with whom he had worked on the Hullabaloo staff. Toole later dated another Louisianan, Clayelle Dalferes; he learned about her through Fletcher. Dalferes and Toole loved the cinema and movie-going was a staple of their dates. Both women said their relationships with Toole never progressed beyond the level of a good night kiss.

== Military service ==
Toole's studies were interrupted by his being drafted into the United States Army in 1961. Toole (who was fluent in Spanish) served two years at Fort Buchanan in Puerto Rico, teaching English to Spanish-speaking recruits. He rose quickly in the military ranks. In under a year, he attained the rank of sergeant, and received numerous awards and citations. While serving in Puerto Rico, he frequently traveled throughout the Caribbean, either alone or with members of his company. Toole, however, began to dread the frustrations of military life and the oppressive heat of Puerto Rico. He described his work there in a letter to a friend:

The arrival of the trainees in late October has kept me very busy; as the "dean" of the English programs here, I am lost in test scores and averages and in the maze of painfully intricate Army politics and intrigue. I am quite powerful in my own little way and exercise more control over personnel and affairs in general than I had ever suspected I would; over my private telephone I contact headquarters, switching people here and there, waiting, listening, planning. I'm sure I will leave my duty here a completely mad tyrant whose niche in civilian life will be non-existent. In its own lunatic way, this is very entertaining ... After a year in Puerto Rico (as of 25 Nov), I find that the positive aspects of that year outweigh the negative. Although this seems like a great cliché, I can say that I have learned a vast amount about humans and their natures—information which I would have enjoyed having earlier. In my own curious way I have risen "meteorically" in the Army without having ever been a decent prospect for military life; but I feel that my very peculiar assignment has been responsible. The insanity and unreality of Puerto Rico itself has been interesting at all times that it was not overwhelming. (great agreement errors in this sentence, I fear). Please write. Ken.

He also engaged in one of the favorite activities of military personnel on the island: alcohol consumption. Both the soldiers and the instructors at the base drank excessively, as alcohol was cheap and plentiful. Toole remarked in another letter to Fletcher, "We are all rotting here at the moment. The decreased draft has meant no trainees since June ... the inactivity here, coupled with the remnants of a rainy and enervating summer has (have?) plunged the English instructors into an abyss of drinking and inertia. Occasionally someone will struggle off to the beach or to San Juan, but the maxim here remains, 'It's too hot.'" When Emilie Griffin paid Toole a visit in December 1961 she was dismayed at what she saw. Toole was notably depressed and while dining at a local hotel she noted that "the windows on all sides of our table were filled with perfect rainbows. Ken was sitting in a pocket of darkness surrounded by these brilliant colored arches and he never looked at them." Adding to Toole's dismay, his class ring from Tulane went missing and he searched the entire base for it, questioning everyone, until concluding that it had been stolen. Disgusted, he wrote home, "It's a wonder I haven't been stabbed yet or paralyzed by intestinal diseases on this insane little geographical mountain top protruding from the Caribbean. However, under any circumstances the loss of the ring affects me deeply."

In the early portion of Toole's military career one of his primary motivations for advancement was to acquire a private office. Privacy was a significant luxury on the island with some of the men renting rooms in nearby hotels so they could have some solitude. Toole's army buddy David Kubach, also an aspiring writer, lent him a green Swedish-made Halda typewriter for use in his office. The barracks consisted solely of college educated English professors, which gave it a different makeup from usual army companies. In contrast to almost all other army barracks where gays kept their sexual orientation a secret, this barracks had a contingent of men who were open about their homosexuality. The gay men reserved a portion of the barracks for themselves and, as they did not proposition any of the straight instructors, they were left alone. However, this particular group of gay men drank significantly more than the rest of the group and eventually began to exhibit a loud, rowdy, and vulgar brand of behavior that made the straight men uncomfortable. Toole's response was to ignore their behavior and it lost him the respect of some of the men in the barracks. The problem came to a head when a gay instructor attempted suicide by overdosing on APC (aspirin, phenacetin, and caffeine) tablets after being spurned by another soldier. When Toole found the man he waited a half-hour to call for help, hoping he would awaken on his own. His friend Kubach stated that this was because it would look bad for the soldier and that he would most likely get himself court martialed for a suicide attempt. Some of his fellow soldiers were livid and held a meeting deciding whether to report Toole's negligence. Ultimately, they did not report his behavior and the army never filed any charges but his relationships with many of the men were irrevocably changed.

After this incident, Toole became withdrawn and began spending more and more time in his office typing what would eventually become his master work, A Confederacy of Dunces. It was not a secret that Toole was writing a book. Late at night, his fellow soldiers could often hear the sound of the typewriter keys. Although he was secretive about the novel among the other men, Toole showed the early portions of it to Kubach, who gave him positive feedback. Around this time, Kubach was transferred and took his typewriter with him, so Toole was forced to buy his own. He later commented that he began to "talk and act like Ignatius" during this period as he became more and more immersed in the creation of the book. His letter home to his parents of April 10, 1963, shows these similarities:

This afternoon we were visited here by General Bogart (inspected, rather, no one simply "visits" us), the Commander of the Caribbean, the gentleman most vocal in favor of sending us away from Puerto Rico. I sincerely hope that he succeeds ... I was surprised to see Charlie Ferguson's [a high school classmate of Toole's] by-line on that article about New Orleans; he graduated from the Tulane law school a few years ago. The article, incidentally, was very badly written; some of it was almost painful to read. I thought that he could do better than that. However, the quality of the writing in the Picayune-States combine is uniformly childish and clumsy. They are very poorly edited newspapers.

== Return home and completion of A Confederacy of Dunces ==
Toole received a hardship discharge as his parents were having difficult economic times, his father struggling with deafness and an increasing incidence of irrational fear and paranoia. Toole looked forward to coming home and spending time talking with his mother. Toole turned down an offer to return to his post at Hunter, and arrived home to a teaching position at Dominican College, a Catholic all-female school. He initially liked the position as it allowed him to teach for only 10.5 hours a week and afforded him the same leisure time he had during his less active periods in the service. The nuns on the faculty were enamored of Toole from the start, considering him well mannered, genteel, and charming. He used his free time to work on his novel, and to spend some time with his musician friend Sidney Snow at Snow's home in the Irish Channel and at various night clubs where he would watch Snow and his bandmates perform, among other things, covers of songs by The Beatles. The November 1963 assassination of John F. Kennedy caused Toole to fall into severe depression. He stopped writing and drank heavily. In February 1964 he resumed writing, at which point he added an ending and sent the manuscript to Simon & Schuster.

A Confederacy of Dunces has been described as a "grand comic fugue" and is considered one of the seminal works of twentieth century Southern literature. It has received praise for its accurate use of various New Orleans dialects, including the Yat dialect. It concerns protagonist Ignatius J. Reilly, a slothful, obese, self-styled philosopher who lives with his mother. After an early financial setback for the Reilly family, caused by Ignatius, he is forced by his mother to seek employment in a variety of menial jobs to help the household financially, for which he is continually resentful of her. He subsequently takes revenge on several businesses for perceived slights. He incites black workers to insurrection at Levy Pants Company, eats more hot dogs than he sells, and attempts to break up a strip club. Along the way he runs into a divergent cast of characters, including Myrna Minkoff, a rebellious socialist intellectual with whom he conducts an ongoing literary correspondence. Although Reilly is partially modeled after Toole's eccentric friend Bob Byrne, Byrne and others have stated that much of Reilly is actually based on Toole himself:

Ken Toole was a strange person. He was extroverted and private. And that's very difficult. He had a strong ... desire to be recognized. ... but also a strong sense of alienation. That's what you have in Ignatius Reilly.

The book eventually reached senior editor Robert Gottlieb, who had talked the then-unknown Joseph Heller into completing the classic comic novel Catch-22. Gottlieb and Toole began a two-year correspondence and dialogue over the novel which would ultimately result in bitter disappointment on both sides. While Gottlieb felt Toole was undoubtedly talented, he was unhappy with the book in its original form. He felt that it had one basic flaw which he expressed to Toole in an early letter:

It seems that you understand the problem—the major problem—involved, but think that the conclusion can solve it. More is required, though. Not only do the various threads need resolving; they can always be tied together conveniently. What must happen is that they must be strong and meaningful all the way through—not merely episodic and then wittily pulled together to make everything look as if it's come out right. In other words, there must be a point to everything you have in the book, a real point, not just amusingness that's forced to figure itself out.

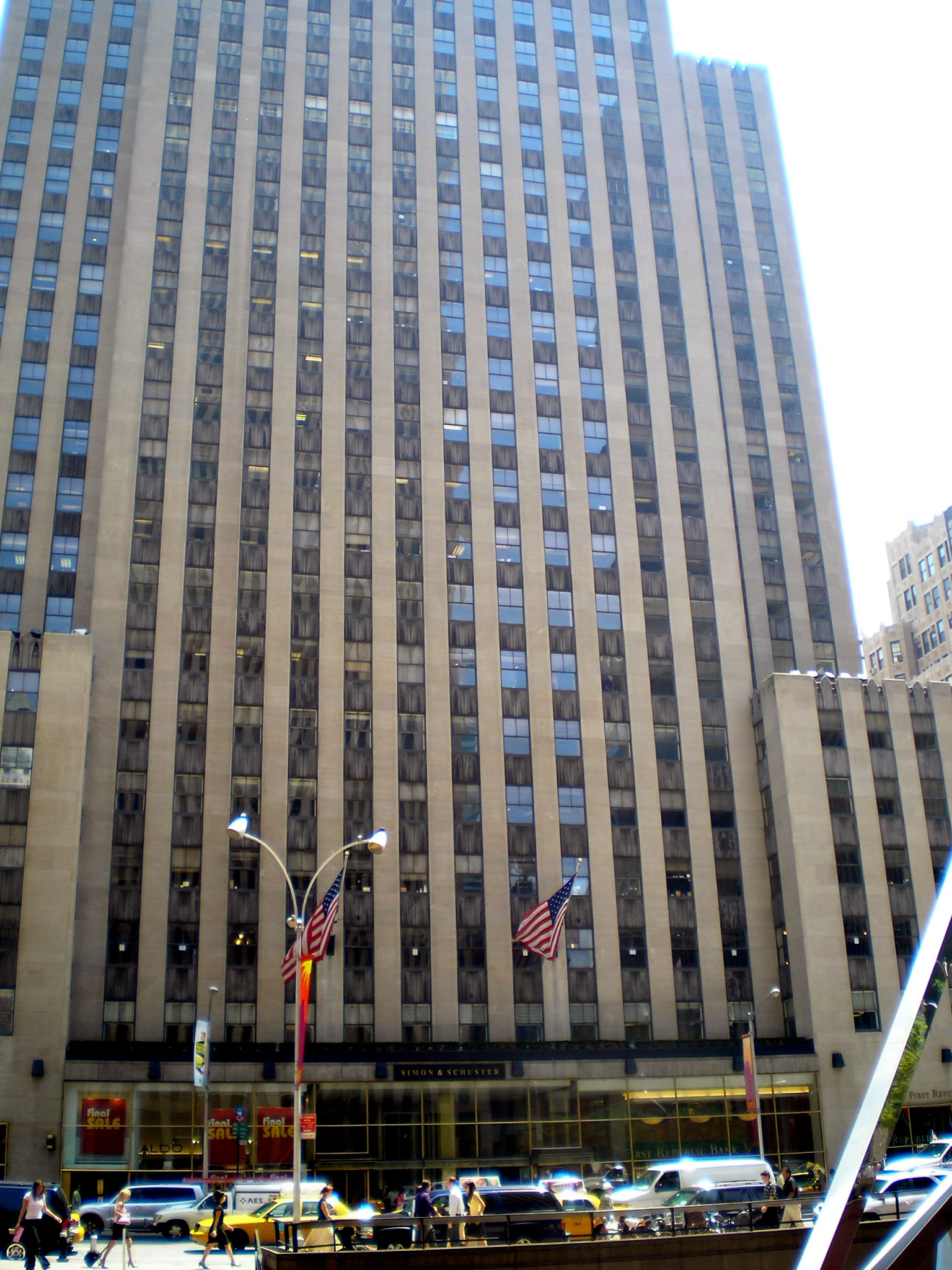
Toole made an unannounced trip to see editor Robert Gottlieb in person at the Simon & Schuster building in New York City in February 1965. When he found out Gottlieb was out of town, Toole felt humiliated.

Initially, although Toole was disappointed that the novel could not be published as is, he was exuberant that a major publisher was interested in it. He entered his second year of teaching at Dominican as one of the favorite new professors on staff. Students marveled at his wit, and Toole would make entire classes burst into laughter while hardly showing any expression. He never retold a story or joke, and had many repeat students. Shortly before Christmas break in 1964, Toole received a letter from Gottlieb. In it Gottlieb remarked that he had shown the novel to Candida Donadio, a literary agent whose clients included Joseph Heller and Thomas Pynchon. Gottlieb told Toole they felt he was "... wildly funny often, funnier than almost anyone around". Also they liked the same portions and characters of the book and disliked the same parts as well. Gottlieb gave a list of things he did not like concluding with:

But that, all this aside, there is another problem: that with all its wonderfulnesses, the book—even better plotted (and still better plotable)—does not have a reason; it's a brilliant exercise in invention, but unlike CATCH [22] and MOTHER KISSES and V and the others, it isn't really about anything. And that's something no one can do anything about.

Later on in the letter, Gottlieb stated that he still had faith in Toole as a writer and that he wished to hold onto the manuscript in case he or Toole would be able to see a way around his objections. Toole decided that it would be best for Gottlieb to return the manuscript, saying "Aside from a few deletions, I don't think I could really do much to the book now—and of course even with revisions you might not be satisfied." Toole made a trip to New York to see Gottlieb in person; however, he was out of town and Toole came back disappointed. He felt that he had embarrassed himself by giving a rambling, uncomfortable speech explaining his situation to one of Gottlieb's office staff. He returned home having left a note for Gottlieb to call him, and they later talked for an hour on the phone. In this conversation Gottlieb reiterated that he would not accept the novel without further revision. He suggested that Toole move on to writing something else, an idea which Toole ultimately rejected.

In a long, partially autobiographical letter he sent to Gottlieb in March 1965, Toole explained that he could not give up on the book since he wrote the novel largely from personal observation and because the characters were based on real people he had seen in his life.

I don't want to throw these characters away. In other words, I'm going to work on the book again. I haven't been able to look at the manuscript since I got it back, but since something of my soul is in the thing, I can't let it rot without trying.

Gottlieb wrote him an encouraging letter, in which he stated again that he felt Toole was very talented (even more so than himself) and that if Toole were to re-submit the manuscript he would continue to "read, reread, edit, perhaps publish, generally cope, until you are fed up with me. What more can I say?" In early 1966, Toole wrote Gottlieb one final letter, which has never been located. Gottlieb wrote back to him on January 17, 1966, reiterating his feelings on the book and stating that he wanted to read it again when Toole created another revision.

== Final years ==
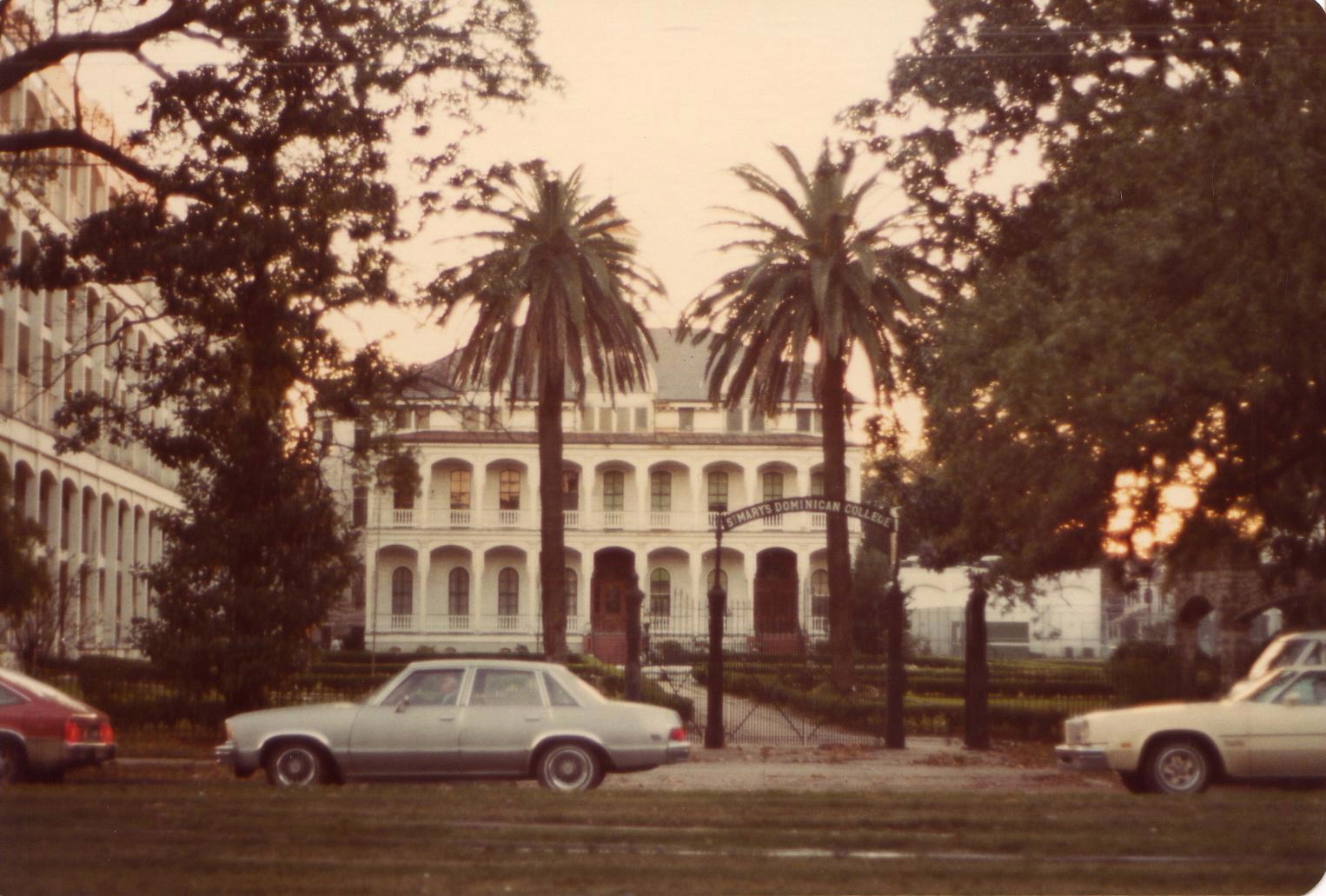
Toole taught English at Dominican College in New Orleans from Fall of 1963 until Fall of 1968. Initially, his Dominican students marveled at his wit and comedic talents. Later, as he began suffering from mental problems, his behavior appalled them.

Toole took the rejection of the book in his intended form as a tremendous personal blow. He eventually ceased work on A Confederacy of Dunces and for a time left it atop an armoire in his bedroom. He continued to teach at Dominican where he remained a favorite among the student body with his classes regularly filling up well before official registration. His comedic performances during lectures remained especially popular. He attempted to work on another novel which he titled The Conqueror Worm, a reference to death as portrayed in Edgar Allan Poe's poem of the same name, but he found little peace at home. Toole's mother persuaded him to take A Confederacy of Dunces to Hodding Carter Jr., who was well known as a reporter and publisher for the Delta Democrat Times in Greenville, Mississippi, and was spending a semester teaching at Tulane. Carter showed little interest in the book but complimented him on it. This face-to-face rejection drove Toole further into despair, and he became angry with his mother for causing him further embarrassment.

Except for a few trips by car to Madison, Wisconsin to see army pal David Kubach, Toole spent most of the last three years of his life at home or at Dominican. In the winter of 1967, Kubach, who had come down to visit Toole, noticed an increased sense of paranoia on Toole's part; once when driving around New Orleans, Toole became convinced they were being followed and attempted to lose the car. The family moved to a larger rental house on Hampson Street, and Toole continued teaching, with his students noticing that his wit had become more acerbic. He continued to drink heavily and gained a great deal of weight, causing him to have to purchase an entire new wardrobe. Toole began having frequent and intense headaches; because aspirin was no help, he saw a doctor. The doctor's treatment was ineffective, and he suggested that Toole see a neurologist, an idea Toole rejected.

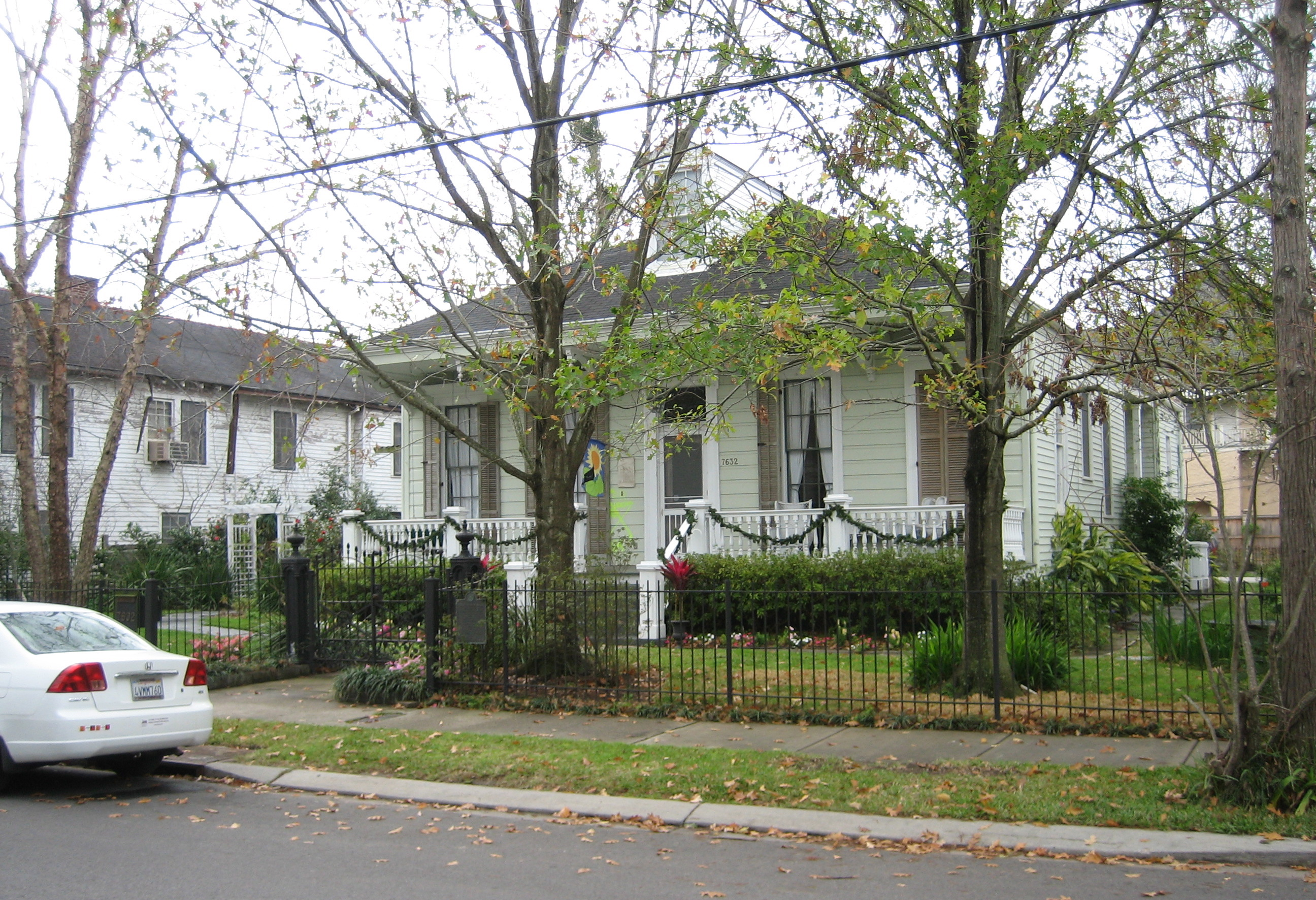
Toole lived in this house in the Carrollton neighborhood of New Orleans while teaching at Dominican.

Toole tried to maintain a sense of normality and enrolled in Tulane in the fall of 1968 with the hopes of acquiring a Ph.D. He took a course studying Theodore Dreiser, on whom he had lectured while at Hunter, and was particularly interested in Dreiser's close relationship with his mother and his anti-Catholic beliefs. The assassinations of Robert F. Kennedy and Martin Luther King Jr. in 1968 added to his feelings of grief and heightened his paranoia. Several of Toole's longtime friends noticed he had an increasing sense of feelings of personal persecution. Toole went to see his friend Bob Byrne at his home in August 1968, where he again expressed sadness and humiliation that his book would not be published. Toole told Byrne that people were passing his home late in the night and honking their car horns at him, that students whispered about him behind his back, and that people were plotting against him. Byrne had a talk with him, which he felt, for the time being, calmed him down.

In the months before his suicide, Toole, who was usually extremely well groomed, "began to appear in public unshaved and uncombed, wearing unpolished shoes and wrinkled clothes, to the amazement of his friends and students in New Orleans." He also began to exhibit signs of paranoia, including telling friends that a woman who he erroneously thought had worked for Simon & Schuster was plotting to steal his book so that her husband, the novelist George Deaux, could publish it.

Toole became increasingly erratic during his lectures at Dominican, resulting in frequent student complaints, and was given to rants against church and state. Toward the end of the 1968 fall semester, he was forced to take a leave of absence and stopped attending classes at Tulane, resulting in his receiving a grade of incomplete. The Tooles spent Christmas of 1968 in disarray, with Toole's father in an increasing state of dementia and Toole searching the home for electronic mind-reading devices.

== Death ==
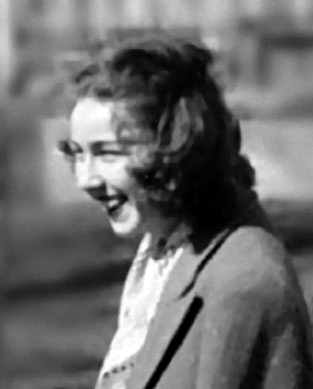
Toole was a lifelong admirer of Southern Gothic fiction writer Flannery O'Connor; his posthumously published novel The Neon Bible is said to resemble her work. Shortly before his suicide, Toole attempted to visit the home of the deceased writer.

When Toole was unable to resume his position at Dominican in January 1969, the school had to hire another professor. This upset his mother and on January 19, 1969, they had an argument. He stopped by the house the next day to pick up some things and spoke only to his father, as Thelma was out at the grocery store. He left home for the final time and withdrew $1,500 (equivalent to $13,200 in 2025) from his savings account. After a week she called the police, but, without any evidence as to his whereabouts, they took a report and waited for him to surface. Thelma became convinced that Toole's friends the Rickels knew where he was and called them repeatedly, even though they denied knowing where he had gone.

Items found in Toole's car show that he drove to California where he visited Hearst Castle and then to Milledgeville, Georgia. Here he most likely attempted to visit Andalusia, the home of deceased writer Flannery O'Connor, although her house was not open to the public. This was succeeded by a drive toward New Orleans. It was during this trip that he stopped outside Biloxi, Mississippi, and died by suicide by running a garden hose from the exhaust pipe in through the window of his car on March 26, 1969. His car and person were clean, and the police officers who found him reported that his face showed no signs of distress. An envelope discovered in the car was marked "to my parents." The suicide note inside the envelope was destroyed by his mother, who later gave varying vague accounts of its details. In one instance she said it expressed his "concerned feeling for her" and later she told a Times-Picayune interviewer that the letter was "bizarre and preposterous. Violent. Ill-fated. Nothing. Insane ravings." He was buried at Greenwood Cemetery in New Orleans. A few years earlier, Toole had driven his army buddy David Kubach to the exact spot where he would later die by suicide. As the location was unremarkable, Kubach did not understand why Toole had taken him there. He left his parents a $2,000 (equivalent to $17,600 in 2025) life-insurance policy, several thousand dollars in savings, and his car. Toole's funeral service was private and attended only by his parents and his childhood nursemaid Beulah Matthews. The students and faculty at Dominican College were grief-stricken over Toole's death, and the school held a memorial service for him in the college courtyard. The head of Dominican gave a brief eulogy which, because of the institution's religious beliefs, did not mention the suicide.

== Posthumous publications ==
After Toole's death, Thelma suffered from depression for two years, and the manuscript for A Confederacy of Dunces remained atop an armoire in Toole's former room. She then determined to find a publisher, believing it would be an opportunity to prove her son's talent. Over a five-year period, she sent it to seven publishers, but all rejected the manuscript. "Each time it came back, I died a little," she said. However, in 1976 she became aware that author Walker Percy was joining the faculty of Loyola University New Orleans. To get Percy to read the manuscript, Thelma began a campaign of phone calls and letters. Percy complained to his wife about a peculiar old woman's attempts to contact him. With time running out on Percy's term as professor, Thelma pushed her way into his office and demanded he read the manuscript. Initially hesitant, Percy agreed to read the book to stop her badgering. He admitted to hoping it would be so bad that he could discard it after reading a few pages. Ultimately, he loved the book, commenting in disbelief:

In this case I read on. And on. First with the sinking feeling that it was not bad enough to quit, then with a prickle of interest, then a growing excitement, and finally an incredulity; surely it was not possible that it was so good.

Despite Percy's great admiration for the book, the road to publication was difficult. Acceptance took more than three years; he attempted to get several parties interested in it. A Confederacy of Dunces was published by Louisiana State University Press in 1980, and Percy provided the foreword. At his recommendation, Toole's first draft of the book was published with minimal copy-editing, and no significant revisions. The first printing was only 2,500 copies, and a number of these were sent to Scott Kramer, an executive at 20th Century Fox, to pitch around Hollywood, but the book initially generated little interest. However, the novel attracted much attention in the literary world. A year later, in 1981, Toole was posthumously awarded the Pulitzer Prize for Fiction. The book eventually sold more than 1.5 million copies, in 18 languages. In 2019, the PBS show The Great American Read ranked A Confederacy of Dunces the 58th (out of 100) most loved book in America.

Toole's only other novel, The Neon Bible, was published in 1989. It was adapted into a feature film in 1995, directed by Terence Davies, that fared poorly at the box office and received a mixed critical reception.

Thelma Toole's tenacity in attempting to publish A Confederacy of Dunces is such that many manuscripts were circulated, thus making it difficult to determine which is the "original." The Loyola University New Orleans and Tulane University archives retain early versions of the manuscript.

== Bibliography ==
- A Confederacy of Dunces (LSU Press, 1980).
- The Neon Bible (Grove Press, 1989).

== Sources ==
- Fletcher, Joel L. Ken and Thelma: The Story of A Confederacy of Dunces. Gretna, La.: Pelican Publishing Company, Inc., 2005. ISBN 1-58980-296-9
- Nevils, René Pol, and Hardy, Deborah George. Ignatius Rising: The Life of John Kennedy Toole. Baton Rouge: Louisiana State University Press, 2001. ISBN 0-8071-3059-1
