= The Beat discography =

This is the discography of British 2-tone/ska band the Beat (known as the English Beat in the US and Canada) and its subsequent incarnations as the Beat featuring Ranking Roger based in the UK, and the English Beat starring Dave Wakeling based in the US.

== Albums ==
=== Studio albums ===
==== The Beat / The English Beat ====
| Title | Album details | Peak chart positions | | | | | |
| Title | Album details | UK | AUS | NOR | NZ | SWE | US |
|---|---|---|---|---|---|---|---|
| I Just Can't Stop It | Released: 23 May 1980; Label: Go-Feet, Sire; Formats: LP, MC | 3 | 66 | 30 | 30 | — | 142 |
| Wha'ppen? | Released: 8 May 1981; Label: Go-Feet, Sire; Formats: LP, MC | 3 | 59 | — | 20 | 28 | 126 |
| Special Beat Service | Released: 1 October 1982; Label: Go-Feet, I.R.S.; Formats: LP, MC, 8-track | 21 | — | — | 50 | — | 39 |
"—" denotes releases that did not chart or were not released in that territory.

==== The Beat featuring Ranking Roger ====
| Title | Album details | Peak chart positions | | |
| Title | Album details | UK | UK Indie | US Reggae |
|---|---|---|---|---|
| Bounce | Released: 30 September 2016; Label: DMF; Formats: CD, LP, digital download | 49 | 15 | 8 |
| Public Confidential | Released: 25 January 2019; Label: DMF; Formats: CD, LP, digital download | — | 7 | — |
"—" denotes releases that did not chart or were not released in that territory.

==== The Beat starring Dave Wakeling ====
| Title | Album details | Peak chart positions | |
| Title | Album details | UK Indie | US Indie |
|---|---|---|---|
| Here We Go Love | Released: 25 May 2018; Label: Here We Go; Formats: CD, LP, digital download | 10 | 17 |

=== Live albums ===
==== The English Beat ====
| Title | Album details |
|---|---|
| Live! at the US Festival | Released: 10 September 2012; Label: Floating World/Shout! Factory; Formats: CD+DVD |

==== The Beat with Ranking Roger / The Beat featuring Ranking Roger ====
| Title | Album details | Peak chart positions |
| Title | Album details | UK Indie |
|---|---|---|
| Live in London | Released: 13 December 2013; Label: Concert Live; Formats: 2×CD | — |
| Live at the Roundhouse | Released: 8 June 2018; Label: DMF; Formats: CD+DVD, 2×LP+DVD, digital download | 31 |
"—" denotes releases that did not chart.

=== Compilation albums ===
| Title | Album details | Peak chart positions | | | |
| Title | Album details | UK | AUS | NZ | US |
|---|---|---|---|---|---|
| What Is Beat? | Released: 3 June 1983; Label: Go-Feet, I.R.S.; Formats: LP, 2xLP, MC | 10 | 44 | 14 | 87 |
| B.P.M.: The Very Best of the Beat | Released: 29 January 1996; Label: Arista; Formats: CD, 2xCD, MC, 2xMC | 13 | — | — | — |
| Beat This! The Best of the Beat | Released: 20 November 2000; Label: Go-Feet, London-Sire; Formats: CD; Released in the US as Beat This! The Best of the English Beat in 2001 | — | — | — | — |
| The Platinum Collection | Released: 10 January 2006; Label: Warner Platinum; Formats: CD | — | — | — | — |
| You Just Can't Beat It: The Best of the Beat | Released: 4 February 2008; Label: Music Club; Formats: 2xCD | — | — | — | — |
| Keep the Beat: The Very Best of the English Beat | Released: 10 July 2012; Label: Shout! Factory; Formats: CD | — | — | — | — |
| Greatest | Released: 25 May 2015; Label: Crimson; Formats: CD, LP | — | — | — | — |
| Hard to Beat: Best of the Beat | Released: 25 August 2017; Label: BMG; Formats: CD, digital download | — | — | — | — |
"—" denotes releases that did not chart or were not released in that territory.

=== Box sets ===
| Title | Album details |
|---|---|
| The Complete Beat | Released: 10 July 2012; Label: Shout! Factory; Formats: 5×CD; All three studio albums plus a bonus dub album |
| The Complete Studio Recordings | Released: 12 May 2014; Label: Edsel; Formats: 4×CD; All three studio albums plus a CD of non-album singles and dub tracks |
| The 7" Singles Collection | Released: 18 April 2018; Label: Edsel; Formats: 13×7"; Vinyl box set of all thirteen 7-inch singles |

== Singles ==
=== The Beat / The English Beat ===
| Title | Year | Peak chart positions | | | | | | | | Album |
| Title | Year | UK | AUS | BEL (FL) | IRE | NL | NZ | US Under | US Dance | Album |
|---|---|---|---|---|---|---|---|---|---|---|
| "Tears of a Clown"/"Ranking Full Stop" | 1979 | 6 | — | 23 | 16 | — | — | — | — | Non-album single (Note: Included on the US version of I Just Cant Stop It.) |
| "Hands Off...She's Mine"/"Twist and Crawl" | 1980 | 9 | — | — | 1 | 41 | — | — | 22 | I Just Can't Stop It |
| "Mirror in the Bathroom" | 1980 | 4 | — | — | 7 | — | — | — | 22 | I Just Can't Stop It |
| "Best Friend"/"Stand Down Margaret" (dub) | 1980 | 22 | — | — | — | — | — | — | — | I Just Can't Stop It |
| "Too Nice to Talk To" | 1980 | 7 | 73 | — | 6 | — | — | — | — | Non-album single |
| "Drowning"/"All Out to Get You" | 1981 | 22 | — | — | 18 | — | — | — | — | Wha'ppen? |
| "Doors of Your Heart" | 1981 | 33 | — | — | — | — | — | — | — | Wha'ppen? |
| "Hit It (Auto Erotic)" | 1981 | 70 | — | — | — | — | — | — | — | Non-album single |
| "Save It for Later" | 1982 | 47 | — | — | — | — | — | 6 | 58 | Special Beat Service |
| "Jeanette"/"March of the Swivel Heads" | 1982 | 45 | — | — | — | — | — | — | — | Special Beat Service |
| "I Confess" | 1982 | 54 | — | — | — | — | — | 5 | 34 | Special Beat Service |
| "Can't Get Used to Losing You" | 1983 | 3 | 77 | 9 | 2 | 12 | 47 | — | — | What Is Beat? |
| "Ackee 1-2-3" | 1983 | 54 | — | — | — | — | — | — | — | What Is Beat? |
| "Mirror in the Bathroom" (remix) | 1995 | 44 | — | — | — | — | — | — | — | B.P.M.: The Very Best of the Beat |
"—" denotes releases that did not chart or were not released in that territory.

=== The Beat featuring Ranking Roger ===
| Title | Year | Album |
|---|---|---|
| "Walking on the Wrong Side" | 2016 | Bounce |
| "Heaven Hiding" (promo-only release) | 2016 | Bounce |
| "Avoid the Obvious" (promo-only release) | 2016 | Bounce |
| "Side to Side" (promo-only release) | 2016 | Bounce |
| "Fire Burn"/"Walk the Walk" (limited release) | 2017 | Live at the Roundhouse |
| "Maniac" | 2018 | Public Confidential |
| "Who's Dat Looking" (promo-only release) | 2019 | Public Confidential |

=== The English Beat starring Dave Wakeling ===
| Title | Year | Album |
|---|---|---|
| "You're Stuck" (promo-only release) | 2018 | Here We Go Love! |
| "The One and Only" (promo-only release) | 2018 | Here We Go Love! |
| "How Can You Stand There?" (promo-only release) | 2018 | Here We Go Love! |

== Videos ==
=== Video albums ===
| Title | Album details |
|---|---|
| Can't Get Used to Losing You: Greatest Hits | Released: September 1983; Label: Palace; Formats: VHS, Beta; Re-released in 1986 by Channel 5 |
| Live in Concert | Released: 1984; Label: WOT Video; Formats: VHS; Australia-only release |
| In Concert at the Royal Festival Hall | Released: 23 August 2005; Label: Secret Films/Music Video Distributors; Formats: DVD |

=== Music videos ===
| Title | Year |
|---|---|
| "Mirror in the Bathroom" | 1980 |
| "Best Friend" | 1980 |
| "Too Nice to Talk To" | 1980 |
| "Drowning" | 1981 |
| "Doors of Your Heart" | 1981 |
| "Hit It (Auto Erotic)" | 1981 |
| "Save It for Later" | 1982 |
| "I Confess" | 1982 |
