= Beat This! The Best of the Beat =

- European cover

Greatest hits album by the Beat
- Released: 20 November 2000; 11 September 2001 (US)
- Genre: Ska; ska punk; new wave
- Length: 47:27; 47:09 (US)
- Label: Go-Feet; London-Sire (US)
- Producer: Bob Sargeant

The Beat chronology
B.P.M.: The Very Best of the Beat (1996)	Beat This! The Best of the Beat (2000)	The Platinum Collection (2006)

Alternative cover
- US cover

Professional ratings
Review scores
Source	Rating
Allmusic	3/5 stars
Encyclopedia of Popular Music	3/5 stars

Beat This! The Best of the Beat (released as Beat This! The Best of the English Beat in the US) is a greatest hits album by British ska/new wave band the Beat, released on 20 November 2000 in Europe by Go-Feet Records and on 11 September 2001 in the US by London-Sire Records.

As well as a different track order, the US version is different from the European release in that the track "Whine and Grine/Stand Down Margaret" (which was from the album I Just Can’t Stop It ) has been replaced with the dub version of "Stand Down Margaret" (which was originally released as a double A-side single with "Best Friend"). The US version is also an enhanced CD that includes exclusive online content and 5 music videos, which are "Doors of Your Heart", "Drowning", "Mirror in the Bathroom", "Save It for Later" and "Too Nice to Talk To".

== Track listing ==
All tracks are written by The Beat, except where noted.

Beat This! The Best of the Beat
No.	Title	Writer(s)	Length
1.	"Mirror in the Bathroom"		3:07
2.	"Save It for Later"		3:35
3.	"I Confess"		4:32
4.	"Tears of a Clown"	Henry Cosby, Stevie Wonder, Smokey Robinson	2:39
5.	"Whine and Grine/Stand Down Margaret"	Prince Buster, The Beat	3:50
6.	"Best Friend"		3:01
7.	"Ranking Full Stop"		2:48
8.	"Can't Get Used to Losing You"	Doc Pomus, Mort Shuman	3:01
9.	"Hands Off...She's Mine"		3:02
10.	"Twist and Crawl"	The Beat, Les Bradell	2:35
11.	"Too Nice to Talk To"		3:08
12.	"Doors of Your Heart"	The Beat, Colin Osborne	3:47
13.	"Click Click"		1:28
14.	"Sole Salvation"		3:04
15.	"Drowning"		3:50
Total length:			47:27

Beat This! The Best of the English Beat
No.	Title	Writer(s)	Length
1.	"Mirror in the Bathroom"		3:06
2.	"Best Friend"		2:59
3.	"Hands Off...She's Mine"		3:00
4.	"Too Nice to Talk To"		3:08
5.	"Doors of Your Heart"	The Beat, Colin Osborne	3:46
6.	"I Confess"		4:31
7.	"Twist and Crawl"	The Beat, Les Bradell	2:35
8.	"Ranking Full Stop"		2:47
9.	"Drowning"		3:51
10.	"Save It for Later"		3:34
11.	"Sole Salvation"		3:04
12.	"Click Click"		1:30
13.	"Tears of a Clown"	Cosby, Wonder, Robinson	2:38
14.	"Can't Get Used to Losing You"	Pomus, Shuman	3:01
15.	"Stand Down Margaret" (Dub)	The Beat	3:39
Total length:			47:09
