= B.P.M.: The Very Best of the Beat =

Greatest hits album by the Beat
- Released: January 1996
- Genre: Ska; new wave; dub
- Label: Go-Feet; Arista
- Producer: Bob Sargeant

The Beat chronology
What Is Beat? (1983)	B.P.M.: The Very Best of the Beat (1996)	Beat This! The Best of the Beat (2000)

Professional ratings
Review scores
Source	Rating
Allmusic	4/5 stars
Encyclopedia of Popular Music	3/5 stars

B.P.M.: The Very Best of the Beat is a greatest hits album by British ska/new wave band the Beat, released in 1996. The deluxe edition includes a second CD with a selection of extended remixes and dub versions.

== Track listing ==
All tracks are written by The Beat, except where noted.

B.P.M...Beats Per Minute
No.	Title	Writer(s)	From the album:	Length
1.	"Mirror in the Bathroom"		I Just Can't Stop It	3:07
2.	"Hands Off...She's Mine"		I Just Can't Stop It	2:57
3.	"Twist and Crawl"	The Beat, Les Bradell	I Just Can't Stop It	2:34
4.	"Jackpot"	George Agard, Sydney Crooks, Jackie Robinson	I Just Can't Stop It	4:20
5.	"Tears of a Clown"	Henry Cosby, Stevie Wonder, Smokey Robinson	1979 UK non-album double A-side single	2:38
6.	"Ranking Full Stop"		1979 UK non-album double A-side single	2:47
7.	"Rough Rider"	Eddy Grant, Patrick Grant, Dervan Gordon, Lincoln Gordon	I Just Can't Stop It	4:49
8.	"Best Friend"		I Just Can't Stop It	3:02
9.	"Stand Down Margaret" (Dub)		1980 double A-side single, different from the version released on I Just Can't Stop It	3:31
10.	"Too Nice to Talk To"		1980 non-album single	3:08
11.	"All Out to Get You"		Wha'ppen?	2:46
12.	"Door of Your Heart"	The Beat, Colin Osborne	Wha'ppen?	3:01
13.	"Drowning"		Wha'ppen?	3:32
14.	"Can't Get Used to Losing You"	Doc Pomus, Mort Shuman	I Just Can't Stop It	3:25
15.	"I Confess" (7" Version)		Special Beat Service	3:33
16.	"Save It for Later"		Special Beat Service	3:34

=== Bonus disc ===
M.B.P.M...More Beats Per Minute
No.	Title	Length
1.	"Twist & Crawl" (12" Version)	4:59
2.	"Too Nice to Talk To" (Dubweiser)	4:57
3.	"Psychedelic Rockers" (Dubweiser)	5:30
4.	"March of the Swivelheads" (Extended Version)	5:14
5.	"Doors of Your Heart" (Dub)	5:50
6.	"Drowning" (Dub)	5:14
7.	"I Confess" (John "Jellybean" Benitez Remix)	5:46
8.	"Can't Get Used to Losing You" (12" 1983 Remix)	4:16
9.	"Mirror in the Bathroom" (Mark 'Spike' Stent Remix)	3:27
10.	"Mirror in the Bathroom" (Tic Tac Toe Remix)	5:40
11.	"Dub in the Bathroom" (Simon & Diamond Mix)	4:41
12.	"Just Can't Stop the Dub" (Adelphi Mix)	4:44
