= What Is Beat? =

What Is Beat? – The Best of The Beat

Greatest hits album by the Beat
- Released: June 1983
- Genre: Ska; 2 Tone; rock; dance-rock
- Length: 44:54
- Label: Go-Feet Records; Arista
- Producer: Bob Sargeant

The Beat chronology
Special Beat Service (1982)	What Is Beat? – The Best of The Beat (1983)	B.P.M.: The Very Best of the Beat (1996)

CD cover
- US CD cover

Professional ratings
Review scores
Source	Rating
AllMusic	4.5/5 stars
Robert Christgau	B+
The Encyclopedia of Popular Music	3/5 stars
Omaha World-Herald	4.5/5 stars

What Is Beat? – The Best of The Beat is a greatest hits album by the ska band the Beat released in 1983. The original vinyl release (and side B of the cassette) included an additional "free album" of extended remixes entitled Frebe. Several songs had previously only been released as singles and B-sides. These include "Too Nice to Talk To", "March of the Swivelheads" and "Psychedelic Rockers". In the UK these also include the A-side "Tears of a Clown" and "Ranking Full Stop". "March of the Swivelheads" later appeared in the film Ferris Bueller's Day Off. The song accompanies the film's climax. The question of the album's title was answered on the back of the original sleeve, "This is Beat!!"

== Track listing ==
Side 1

1. "Tears of a Clown" - 2:38 from I Just Can't Stop It
2. "Hands Off...She's Mine" - 2:58 from I Just Can't Stop It
3. "Mirror in the Bathroom" - 3:07 from I Just Can't Stop It
4. "Stand Down Margaret" - 3:31 from I Just Can't Stop It
5. "Doors of Your Heart" - 2:59 from Wha'ppen?
6. "Twist and Crawl" - 2:33 from I Just Can't Stop It
7. "Save It for Later" - 3:35 from Special Beat Service

Side 2

1. "Too Nice to Talk To" - 3:05 (non-album single)
2. "I Confess" - 3:33 from Special Beat Service
3. "Best Friend" - 3:04 from I Just Can't Stop It
4. "Drowning" - 3:33 from Wha'ppen?
5. "Ackee 1-2-3" - 3:07 Previously unreleased
6. "Can't Get Used to Losing You" - 3:23 from I Just Can't Stop It (1983 remix)
7. "Ranking Full Stop" 2:46 from I Just Can't Stop It

Frebe Side 1

1. "Twist and Crawl" - 4:58
2. "Too Nice to Talk To" - 4:56
3. "Psychedelic Rockers" - 5:30
4. "March of the Swivelheads" - 5:12

Frebe Side 2

1. "Save It for Later" - 4:54
2. "Doors of Your Heart" - 5:52
3. "Drowning" 5:14
4. "I Confess" 5:50

U.S. CD

1. "Mirror in the Bathroom" - 3:07
2. "Twist and Crawl" - 2:33
3. "Tears of a Clown" - 2:39
4. "Can't Get Used To Losing You" (Remix) - 3:23
5. "Doors of Your Heart" - 2:59
6. "What's Your Best Thing" (UK single) - 3:47
7. "Hit It" (UK single) - 3:00
8. "Save It for Later" (12" version) 4:54
9. "Best Friend" - 3:02
10. "I Confess" (12" remix) - 5:45
11. "Too Nice to Talk To" (UK single) - 3:05
12. "Get a Job/Stand Down Margaret" (recorded live in Boston, 19 November 1982) - 6:40
