= The Complete Beat =

Box set by The English Beat
- Released: 10 July 2012
- Recorded: 1979–1982
- Genres: Ska; 2 tone; new wave; dub
- Length: 294:14
- Label: Shout! Factory
- Producers: Bob Sargeant; Mike Hedges; The Beat

The English Beat chronology
Keep The Beat: The Very Best of The English Beat (2012)	The Complete Beat (2012)	The Complete Studio Recordings (2014)

The Complete Beat is a 5-CD box set by British ska/new wave band The Beat (known as The English Beat in the US) released on 10 July 2012 only in the US and Canada. The box set contains The Beat's three studio albums remastered and two CDs of bonus content: the first contains extended and dub versions, and the second contains all the tracks from their three Peel Sessions and several tracks live from the Boston Opera House.

The studio albums are the US release versions, as "Tears of a Clown", "Ranking Full Stop", "Too Nice to Talk To" and "Hit It" weren't included on the original UK releases of their respective albums. Also, both Wha'ppen and Special Beat Service CDs include bonus tracks.

On the same day of release, Shout! Factory also released the single-CD compilation album Keep The Beat: The Very Best of The English Beat and a live album, Live at the US Festival, '82 & '83.

== Critical reception ==
Professional ratings
Aggregate scores
Source	Rating
Metacritic	90/100
Review scores
Source	Rating
AllMusic	4.5/5 stars
The Austin Chronicle	4/5 stars
Blurt	8/10
Goldmine	4/5 stars
Los Angeles Times	3.5/5 stars
Paste	9.1/10
Punknews	5/5 stars
Rolling Stone	4.5/5 stars

AllMusic critic Stephen Thomas Erlewine gave the box set a rating of 4.5 out of 5 and said "as always, the extended mixes and dubs are something that appeals to a particular taste -- those who prefer the pop end of the Beat's equation won't find them compelling -- but their rangy, elastic reworkings underline the adventure and excitement at the core of the Beat. They grew up strong and they grew up fast, so fast that their recordings retain a visceral force that makes The Complete Beat something more than a dream come true for fans: it is a convincing argument for their greatness."

The review aggregator Metacritic has it at a score of 90/100 based on 8 critic reviews. Ray Sidman for Goldmine gave it a 4/5, saying that "there are a few songs in the bunch that are subpar or worse, as would be expected of any performer, but overall, The English Beat built a solid New Wave oeuvre". "The set’s packaging is simple but attractive and sturdy" with a "well-written, 24-page booklet by Alex Ogg that provides a history of band"and "though there are no previously unreleased songs here, many of the rarities are receiving a CD release for the first time with this set".

Reviewing for Rolling Stone magazine, Jody Rosen gave the box set 4.5/5 and said that it "features the band's three great studio albums, plus terrific bonus tracks and dub versions, and a slew of live recordings in which the Beat unleash their dance-floor fury and their Thatcher-era protest politics." Stephen Deusner for Paste magazine gave the box set 9.1/10 and concluded that the live tracks are the "most compelling, if only because it takes them out of the relatively hermetic environment of the studio and puts them in front of an audience. The Complete Beat argues that the band made solid albums as full statements, but this handful of tracks—especially “Tears of a Clown” and “Get-A-Job/Stand Down Margaret”—show them in their natural setting."

== Track listing ==
All tracks are written by The English Beat, except where noted.

Disc 1: I Just Can't Stop It
No.	Title	Writer(s)	Length
1.	"Mirror in the Bathroom"		3:08
2.	"Hands Off...She's Mine"		2:59
3.	"Two Swords"		2:18
4.	"Twist & Crawl"	The English Beat, Les Bradsell	2:34
5.	"Tears of a Clown"	Hank Cosby, Smokey Robinson, Stevie Wonder	2:39
6.	"Rough Rider"	Eddy Grant, Patrick Grant, Dervan Gordon, Lincoln Gordon	4:52
7.	"Click Click"		1:27
8.	"Ranking Full Stop"		2:47
9.	"Big Shot"		2:32
10.	"Whine & Grine/Stand Down Margaret"	Prince Buster, The English Beat	3:46
11.	"Noise in This World"		2:15
12.	"Can't Get Used to Losing You"	Doc Pomus, Mort Shuman	3:05
13.	"Best Friend"		3:03
14.	"Jackpot"	George Agard, Sydney Crooks, Jackie Robinson	4:17

Disc 2: Wha'ppen?
No.	Title	Writer(s)	Length
1.	"Too Nice to Talk To"		3:07
2.	"Doors of Your Heart"	The English Beat, Colin Osborne	3:46
3.	"All Out to Get You"		2:45
4.	"Monkey Murders"		3:09
5.	"I Am Your Flag"		2:53
6.	"French Toast (Soleil Trop Chaud)"	Joseph Jefferson	3:28
7.	"Drowning"		3:52
8.	"Dream House in NZ"		3:11
9.	"Walk Away"		3:11
10.	"Over and Over"		2:40
11.	"Cheated"		3:28
12.	"Get-a-Job"		3:10
13.	"The Limits We Set"		4:15
14.	"Psychedelic Rockers"		3:52
15.	"Hit It"		3:02
16.	"Which Side of the Bed?"		4:11

Disc 3: Special Beat Service
No.	Title	Writer(s)	Length
1.	"I Confess"		4:30
2.	"Jeanette"		2:47
3.	"Sorry"		2:32
4.	"Sole Salvation"		3:05
5.	"Spar Wid Me"		4:30
6.	"Rotating Head"		3:24
7.	"Save It for Later"		3:33
8.	"She's Going"		2:09
9.	"Pato and Roger a Go Talk" (sung by Pato and Roger)	The English Beat, Pato Benson	3:19
10.	"Sugar & Stress"		2:55
11.	"End of the Party"		3:29
12.	"Ackee 1 2 3"		3:11
13.	"What's Your Best Thing"		3:47
14.	"March of the Swivel Heads"		3:31
15.	"Cool Entertainer" (sung by Roger Wakeling)		3:32
16.	"A Go Talk" (Tappy Luppy Dub) (sung by Pato and Roger)	The English Beat, Pato Benson	8:38

Disc 4: Bonus Beat – 12" & Dub Versions
No.	Title	Writer(s)	Length
1.	"Hands Off...She's Mine" (Extended)		4:35
2.	"Twist & Crawl" (Extended)	The English Beat, Les Bradsell	5:00
3.	"Stand Down Margaret" (Dub)		3:32
4.	"Too Nice to Talk To" (Dubweiser)		4:58
5.	"Psychedelic Rockers" (Dubweiser)		5:30
6.	"Doors of Your Heart" (Extended)	The English Beat, Colin Osborne	5:50
7.	"Drowning" (Dub)		5:13
8.	"Hit It" (Extended)		6:29
9.	"Which Side of the Bed?" (Extended)		7:27
10.	"Save It for Later" (Extended)		4:53
11.	"What's Your Best Thing" (Dub)		3:49
12.	"Cool Entertainer" (Extended) (sung by Ranking Roger)		5:50
13.	"Jeanette"		4:08
14.	"March of the Swivel Heads" (Extended)		5:14
15.	"I Confess" (Dave Allen Remix)		5:45

Disc 5: Bonus Beat – Peel Sessions & Live in Boston
No.	Title	Writer(s)	Length
1.	"Tears of a Clown" (Peel Session – November 5, 1979)	Cosby, Robinson, Wonder	2:53
2.	"Ranking Full Stop" (Peel Session – November 5, 1979)		3:02
3.	"Click Click" (Peel Session – November 5, 1979)		1:30
4.	"Mirror in the Bathroom" (Peel Session – November 5, 1979)		2:24
5.	"Big Shot" (Peel Session – November 5, 1979)		1:53
6.	"Too Nice to Talk To" (Peel Session – September 22, 1980)		4:10
7.	"Psychedelic Rockers" (Peel Session – September 22, 1980)		4:19
8.	"Monkey Murders" (Peel Session – September 22, 1980)		3:12
9.	"Walk Away" (Peel Session – September 22, 1980)		3:13
10.	"Spar Wid Me" (Peel Session – March 29, 1982)		3:47
11.	"End of the Party" (Peel Session – March 29, 1982)		3:01
12.	"She's Going" (Peel Session – March 29, 1982)		2:06
13.	"Save It for Later" (Peel Session – March 29, 1982)		3:09
14.	"Sole Salvation" (Peel Session – March 29, 1982)		2:43
15.	"Pato and Roger a Go Talk" (Peel Session – March 29, 1982)	The English Beat, Pato Benson	4:03
16.	"Best Friend" (Opera House, Boston – November 19, 1982)		2:59
17.	"Tears of a Clown" (Opera House, Boston – November 19, 1982)	Cosby, Robinson, Wonder	3:34
18.	"Twist & Crawl" (Opera House, Boston – November 19, 1982)	The English Beat, Les Bradsell	2:44
19.	"Get-a-Job/Stand Down Margaret" (Opera House, Boston – November 19, 1982)		6:45
