= Here We Go Love =

Studio album by the Beat
- Released: 25 May 2018
- Recorded: 2015
- Studios: NRG, Los Angeles, California
- Genres: Reggae rock; ska
- Length: 57:19
- Label: Here We Go
- Producer: Kyle Hoffmann

The Beat chronology
Bounce (2016)	Here We Go Love (2018)	Public Confidential (2019)

Singles from Here We Go Love
- 1. "How Can You Stand There?" Released: 6 April 2018

“It seemed like an easy idea in the beginning, but then you start thinking, ‘How much do you make it sound like a Beat record—or what people imagine Beat records sound like? How much will it sound like the first record, the second record, or the third record, because they all seemed to me to sound quite different.”

— Guitarist and vocalist Dave Wakeling on determining the sound of Here We Go Love.

Here We Go Love is a studio album by rock and ska band the Beat credited as the Beat Starring Dave Wakeling, released in the UK on 25 May 2018 and in the US on 15 June 2018.

== Reception ==
Greil Marcus wrote that "Wakeling still reaches for what he can’t quite grasp, and ends up with more than most people even want. There’s nothing here to match 'Save It for Later,' but a whole album of 'Tenderness' is nothing to apologize for. With 'The Love You Give' you hear the beat the group named itself for; 'If Killing Worked' ('It would have worked by now'), a dance of flow and release, gives a special pleasure as you wait for the horns you just know are coming in, almost right now."

Editors at AllMusic rated this album 3.5 out of 5 stars, with critic Mark Deming writing that the music "doesn't sound all that much like the Beat" as this lacks "the fierce attack" of the Beat's earliest work and sounds more like Wakeling's band General Public. In Glide Magazine, Doug Collette scored this album a 7 out of 10, writing that "the chirpy delivery remains irresistible on tunes such as the title song even as it belies a somewhat jaundiced view of the world" and praising Wakeling's vocals. Writing for PunkNews, Julie River gave Here We Go Love 3 out of 5 stars and she wrote that "it was probably because of the fact that my expectations were so low that I enjoyed the album as much as I did" and continued that the song quality varies across the album. Aaron Badgley of Spill Magazine rated this work an 8 out of 10, noting the mix of rock and ska elements in the music, as well as the diverse lyrical themes, summing up that it is "a great album, and it is wonderful to have Dave Wakeling and The English Beat back".

Gwen Ihnat of The A.V. Club scored Here We Go Love a C−, praising some tracks, but continuing that "the rest of the record lacks this much spark, with many tracks running together in a chirpy, insipid ska hodgepodge".

== Track listing ==
All songs written by Dave Wakeling, except where noted.

1. "How Can You Stand There?" – 4:05
2. "The One and the Only" – 4:22
3. "Redemption Time" (Kiran Shahani, Rick Torres, and Wakeling) – 5:11
4. "If Killing Worked" – 4:57
5. "Here We Go Love" – 3:32
6. "Never Die" – 4:42
7. "The Love You Give" – 3:29
8. "You Really Oughtta Know" – 4:19
9. "You're Stuck" – 2:25
10. "Every Time You Told Me" (Shahani, Torres, and Wakeling) – 5:47
11. "Dem Call It Ska" (Wayne Lothian and Wakeling) – 3:48
12. "Drive Her Away" – 3:50
13. "Be There for You" – 6:59

== Personnel ==
Musicians

- Roddy 'Radiation' Byers – electric guitar
- Tony Chin – electric guitar
- Andy Cox – garden shears
- Drew Erickson – organ, horn and string arrangement
- Antonee First Class – toasting
- Isaiah Gage – cello
- Rich Hinman – pedal steel guitar
- Raynier Jacildo – keyboards
- Native Wayne Jobson – electric guitar
- Jelani Jones – background vocals
- Nate Laguzza – drums, percussion
- Thomas Lea – viola
- Danny T. Levin – trumpet, piccolo trumpet, flugelhorn, trombone, euphonium
- Nate Light – bass guitar
- Luis Maldonado – electric guitar
- David Moyer – baritone saxophone, tenor saxophone, alto saxophone, piccolo, recorder, bass clarinet
- Durga McBroom – background vocals
- Perry Morris – percussion
- Everett Morton – congas
- Jared Palazzollo – guitar
- Michael Railton – piano, organ, accordion, synthesizers
- Roger Rivas – organ
- Jon Sosin – acoustic guitar, electric guitar
- Deborah Troiano – background vocals
- Dave Wakeling – electric guitar, lead vocals
- Eli Wakeling – background vocals
- Josef Wakeling – background vocals
- Kevin Williams – background vocals
- Leah Zeger – violin

Technical personnel

- Jay Baumgardner – mixing
- Hunt Emerson – artwork
- Kyle Hoffmann – audio engineering, production
- Ted Jensen – audio mastering

== Charts ==
Chart (2018)	Peak position
Scottish Albums (Official Charts)	39
UK Independent Albums (Official Charts)	10
US Independent Albums (Billboard)	17

== See also ==
- 2018 in American music
- 2018 in British music
- List of 2018 albums
- List of longest gaps between studio albums
