= Click Click (disambiguation) =

Click Click is a British electro-industrial music band formed in 1982.

Click Click may also refer to:

- "Click Click", a song by The Beat from the 1980 album I Just Can't Stop It
- A synonym for a double click, the act of pressing a computer mouse button twice quickly without moving the mouse
