= Wha'ppen? =

Studio album by the Beat
- Released: 8 May 1981
- Studio: Roundhouse Studios (London)
- Genres: Ska; two-tone; worldbeat
- Length: 39:50; 43:20 (CD)
- Labels: Go-Feet; Sire
- Producer: Bob Sargeant

The Beat chronology
I Just Can't Stop It (1980)	Wha'ppen? (1981)	Special Beat Service (1982)

CD cover
- 1999 re-release

Singles from Wha'ppen?
- 1. "Drowning"/"All Out to Get You" Released: 10 April 1981; 2. "Doors of Your Heart" Released: 12 June 1981

Wha'ppen? is the second studio album by the English ska band the Beat (credited on the US release as "the English Beat"). It was released in 1981 on Go-Feet Records in the United Kingdom and Sire Records in the United States. After the critical and commercial success of I Just Can't Stop It (1980), which mixed ska, reggae and punk rock with social lyrics, the band changed direction on Wha'ppen?, taking influence from many other musical styles, including African, steel band and dub music, while keeping reggae at its core. The fast pace of the band's previous work is put aside for a slower, mid-tempo pace. Accompanying the music are socially conscious, political lyrics. The band recorded at Roundhouse Studios with producer Bob Sargeant.

Released in May 1981, Wha'ppen? was a commercial success, peaking at No. 3 on the UK Albums Chart, though its singles were the least commercially successful the band had released to date. Fans' reaction to the album was mixed, with some finding the band to have "mellowed out," though the album gave the band a larger American audience than before. Critics were generally favourable towards the album's musicianship and lyricism. NME named it the 4th best album of 1981, while Robert Christgau named it the 5th best album of 1981.

Wha'ppen? has been re-released and remastered several times.

== Background and concept ==
The Beat formed in 1978 and, according to Chris Woodstra, became "one of the earliest and most important ska revivalist groups" with their multiracial line-up and alternating lead vocals from toaster Ranking Roger and guitarist Dave Wakeling. They were part of the two-tone music scene in the Midlands that mixed ska, reggae, punk rock and politically and socially conscious lyrics. They briefly signed to 2 Tone Records for their debut single, a Top 10 cover of "Tears of a Clown," before creating Go-Feet Records, on which they released their critically and commercially acclaimed debut album I Just Can't Stop It (1980), which mixed political and personal lyrics with rocksteady and a punk energy.

After I Just Can't Stop It, the band felt they had to change their sound for their second album. Ranking Roger of the band felt this may have been because of fellow two-tone band the Specials changing their musical style on their second album More Specials (1980). He felt that while the first Specials album was "very punkish with an edge," More Specials "was like Muzak, hotel music! Obviously they’d been on the road too long, that’s what we thought. We thought they’ve been on the road too long cause this is the kind of music we hear in them hotels when we tour round America – everywhere! But it still had a message and that was really successful for them. And maybe it was more successful for them because they challenged to change."

Whereas the Beat had listened to reggae, dub and punk rock bands like the Clash and Devo when touring in preparation for their first album, several band members had become tired of the heavy bass work of dub music and the "thrashy" nature of punk rock when touring in preparation for their second album. Instead, the band began listening to West African music, the influence of which can be heard on Wha'ppen?. Ranking Roger noted: "What you listen to on your bus could dictate what your next album sounds like." The band's idea for Wha'ppen? was "not to keep the same, but to keep changing." Consequently, the band made Wha'ppen? more relaxed than its predecessor, while retaining the "melodies and catchy hook lines." Ranking Roger later described Wha'ppen? as "the most relaxed Beat album" and noted that "Californians and surfers, people like that – that album was made for them."

== Writing and recording ==
After touring with the Pretenders, the Beat began jamming to curate ideas for Wha'ppen?. During this period, the band read letters from their fan club, one of which was from an American woman who told the band she attempted to use their music in fitness lessons but found it too fast. Roger noted: "It was a lovely written letter so we decided to tone it down a bit in the way that The Beat became what we call 'one-drop', where the rim shot and the snare hits at the same time and that’s the main emphasis. So we did 'Doors of your Heart' and 'Monkey Murders' and along with a few others and that was the kind of style for that album in the end."

"Everybody would write onto somebody else’s thing and a lot of the lyrics from the second album and the third album came in that way. It was a great way to get stuff together and say well that’s a band effort. Cause even like the smallest line from the drummer could get into the song. We used a lot of bits from headlines and stuff like that. It all came together and made sense."

— Ranking Roger

The band found it difficult to write lyrics while on tour, so they each bought a notepad, jotted down ideas, kept them for several days and then passed them onto other band members, who then wrote their own ideas onto the sheet. This communal fashion of writing songs was not unlike their approach to writing I Just Can't Stop It, as the lyrics of both albums were created when several band members would propose lyrics, and after passing these lyrics around the group, the whole band decided on what to retain and reject. As the band's musical influences were disparate, the band wrote the music in a more complex fashion, where, "[a]s a consequence, through playing an embryonic song over and over, 'everybody sort of jostles for position' until [the band agreed] upon a satisfying arrangement." Bruce Dancis of Mother Jones believe this contributed towards the gentler, moodier sound of Wha'ppen? in comparison to I Just Can't Stop It.

Wha'ppen? was recorded at Roundhouse Studios, London, in 1981 and produced by Bob Sargeant. While this was the same studio that the band's debut album was recorded in, Wha'ppen? was recorded in only half the time and half the budget, due to the expenses of digital recording and the pressures placed on the band by Arista Records, who owned the band's label Go-Feet Records. Five guest musicians appear on the album, most notably guest keyboardist Dave "Blockhead" Wright, who was 38 when working on the album and had taken with him many years of experience, having notably worked with XTC and playing in the Saint Kitts steel band the Casanovas. The album was engineered by Mark Dearnley and mastered at The Town House.

== Composition ==
=== Music ===
Wha'ppen? moves the Beat into a variety of musical directions as they incorporate disparate influences into their music. While, like its predecessor, Wha'ppen? still uses the basic elements of reggae at its core, it uses the genre as a foundation for rhythmic experiments. The album was greatly influenced by the band members' growing individual collections of African music as well as instruments from African and Chinese music, and is less abrasive and more mellow, mid-tempo and maturely paced than I Just Can't Stop It, which featured a punk rock-styled dense, hectic pace. The Beat felt that a one drop rhythmic emphasis on simultaneous rim shot and snare hits dominates the album.

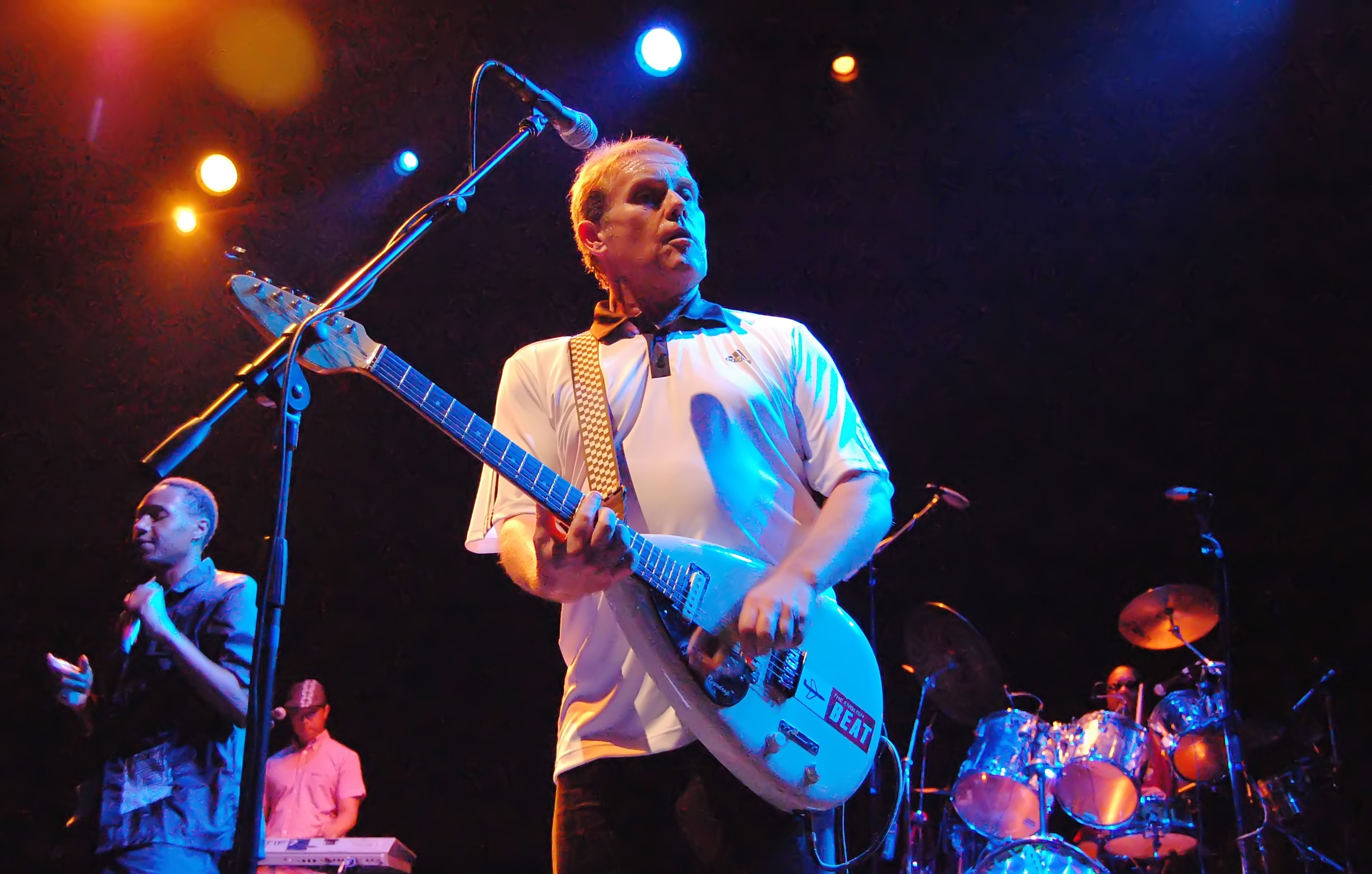
Dave Wakeling of the Beat, playing with the English Beat in 2009

The album incorporates Afrobeat percussion, steelpans and notable usage of studio space, as well as midtempo grooves drawn from an array of Third World cultures. According to Robert Christgau, the album is a worldbeat record with "snaky grooves" and a variety of rhythms beyond the group's signature riddims, which are retained only in part. Saxa's saxophone work guides the album and displays an eclectic style, with both loud and quiet parts, while his "long-growl ballad solos" are resumed on the album from the Beat's previous work. Guest musicians contribute trumpets and marimbas to the album.

"Doors of Your Heart" is a dreamy pop song dominated by saxophone and laced with dub music. "Monkey Murders" incorporates Spanish guitar in a high-stepping fashion. Sung in Dominican Creole French, "French Toast (Soleil Trop Chaud)" is a cover of "Soleil Trop Chaud" (1974) by Dominica-based Gramacks which mixes Cadence-lypso and Afrobeat. According to Jo-Ann Greene of AllMusic, "Drowning" and "Dream Home in NZ" combine reggae with art rock experimentation reminiscent of Gang of Four. "Walk Away" is influenced by the Motown Sound, while "Over and Over" builds into a steel band groove. One critic described "Cheated" as being in a "bellicose dub" style." "Get-a-Job" is a pop song with influences from funk.

=== Lyrics ===
Wha'ppen? continues the socially-concerned, angry lyrics from the Beat's previous work, with songs displaying downbeat views of numerous social and personal troubles. Ed Ward of NPR Music felt the album was more strongly political than its predecessor. The album was released during the 1981 England riots, and according to Milo Miles of Rolling Stone, the songs address relevant issues to the riots including the "fears tearing daily life apart" and "the tactics, however brutal, that everyone uses to cope," with several songs in particular being cautionary and dread-ridden with a plea for unity. Angst is prevalent throughout the lyrics of "All Out to Get You", "A Dream Home in NZ" and "Monkey Murders", while "Drowning" is also downbeat. "I Am Your Flag" intensely attacks jingoism and nationalism, while "Over and Over" attacks the "cult of violence." Beyond the political themes, several songs also concern depressed romances.

According to Christgau, opening song "Doors of Your Heart" is a "unity rocker" where "love means eros and agape simultaneously, and Wakeling finds that dread blocks the way to both, and Roger advises him to stop his fighting." In the song's reggae toast, Ranking Roger draws similarities between eros and agape, where "everybody looks the same when the lights are out". The song features guest falsetto vocals from Jamaican musician Cedric Myton. "All Out to Get You" and "Monkey Murders" highlight tensions raised by "a society in quiet desperation," while "Drowning" is about the death fantasy of a harried business man. According to Greene, "Cheated" and "Get-a-Job" both "take headers into the paucity of British life and opportunities in general." Of the two songs, "Cheated" tackles Rupert Murdoch's dominance over the British media, while "Get-a-Job" concerns unemployment. "French Toast (Soleil Trop Chaud)" is sung in Dominican Creole French.

Miles felt the "bracing fervor" of the music turns the lyrically bleak songs into "sharp exhortations to dance all over one's troubles," with "Drowning" being an "eerie variation" in regards to its gliding and dipping, breezy beat and "suicide-is-sensuous fable" lyrics. Trouser Press shared these sentiments, finding the loping music, effervescent sax and playful mixing of vocalists to "almost obscure the songs' depressing views of personal and social troubles," something they felt was "not out of character" for the band." Ranking Roger noted: "The music was happy, the lyrics sad. We always had a yin-yang thing going."

== Release and promotion ==
Careful consideration went into the album title, and proposed albums names included, among many titles, Misdemean and Dance Yourself Stupid. The final name, Wha'ppen?, is a Jamaican term – frequently used by Ranking Roger to his bandmates – meaning "what's going on?". Heather Augustyn, in her book Ska: An Oral History, found the name to be very similar to "Wha'up Skavoovie?", a 1960s Jamaican phrase used by Cluett Johnson of Clue J & His Blues Blasters which is believed to have inspired the name 'ska'. The album cover was designed by Hunt Emerson and the Beat. Exemplifying the lighthearted side of the band, the back cover of the album shows snapshots of the band in sunny weather.

Wha'ppen? was released in the United Kingdom in May 1981 by the band's label Go-Feet Records. It was a success in the UK Albums Chart, peaking at No. 3 and staying on the chart for 18 weeks, although the album's singles were less successful than their earlier singles. "Drowning" and "All Out to Get You" were released as a double A-side ahead of the album in April 1981, which peaked at No. 22 on the UK Singles Chart, at the time their-joint lowest placing, whereas "Doors of Your Heart" was released as the second and final single in June with "Get-a-Job" on the B-side, only reaching No. 33 on the chart. In the United States, where the band was known as the English Beat, the album was their final on Sire Records. To promote Wha'ppen? in the US, copies of the album, alongside specially pressed EPs consisting of material previously unavailable in the US, were used in campus radio promotions in 50 college campuses. It reached No. 126 on the US Billboard 200 and spent six weeks on the chart.

Fans of the band were mixed in their reaction to Wha'ppen?; Ranking Roger recalled that the album was "weird" in that it was more relaxed than the "really up and dancey" I Just Can't Stop It, commenting that: "I don't know what people thought, but when it came out people were like, 'what's happened to The Beat?'." Fans in the UK felt the album saw the band leave their ska sound behind and had followed the Specials in having "mellowed out." Roger recalled: "It's a lot like The Specials who came out with their first album all guns blazing, then the second album was more like muzak and Spanish music and we thought, 'hey up what's going on? It's modern cowboy music or something?' – but people still got into it, they still think of it as a classic." Nonetheless, when the Beat toured California, the band found that the surfers, mods and "beach bums" of the state were enjoying the album. Roger felt that this was when he "realised how brilliant this band was at merging in such a subtle, sophisticated way and not in a pushing it in your face way."

In 1987, I.R.S. Records re-released the album on CD in the US, while in 1999, Go-Feet and London Records released a new, CD version of the album in the UK digitally remastered from the original masters by Sargeant at the Townhouse Studio, the same studio it was originally recorded in. This version has new artwork and adds the hit "Too Nice to Talk To" to the track list. In June 2012, Edsel Records released deluxe editions of Wha'ppen? and the band's other studio albums, with each deluxe edition including bonus material and an extra DVD. The album was also included in the band's 2012 box set The Complete Beat alongside the band's other albums among other material. Wha'ppen? was re-released on heavyweight vinyl only by Demon Records in August 2013. This version was remastered from the original reel-to-reel tapes using 64 tracks over two 32-track recorders over a period of some three months.

== Critical reception ==
Professional ratings
Review scores
Source	Rating
AllMusic	4/5 stars
Christgau's Record Guide	A
Encyclopedia of Popular Music	3/5 stars
The Great Rock Bible	7/10
Record Mirror	4/5 stars
Rolling Stone	4/5 stars
The Rolling Stone Album Guide	3/5 stars
Smash Hits	7/10
Spin Alternative Record Guide	6/10

Wha'ppen? was released to a mostly positive reception from music critics. Mark Cooper of Record Mirror rated the album four stars out of five and noted how the band "[defined] their sound over a whole album, realise their strengths (most notably the individuality of each performer) and, in general, settle down." He felt that while I Just Can't Stop It consisted "largely of singles, imaginative covers, odd bits," Wha'ppen? is comparatively "a settled Beat product with a consistent sound – lazy, sunny, sinuous, sexy. And still pushy." John Swenson of Musician reviewed Wha'ppen? alongside the Specials' Ghost Town EP. He felt the "collective spirit of a hot interracial band somehow captures the very essence of post World War II popular music," complimenting the bands' two-tone style as "a true melding of the interracial musical spirit that has produced so much of the greatest music of the past two decades — Stax/Volt, Little Feat, Miles Davis, the Butterfield Blues Band, etc., etc."

Milo Miles of Rolling Stone wrote that: "Except in sheer pep, Wha'ppen? marks an advance for the English Beat: truly complex love-and-jealousy tales, politics that are more keenly defined." He said that, alongside Kid Creole and the Coconuts, the Beat "have an instant-legend aura about them, weaving an eccentric path between black and white, calculation and craziness, that's hard to follow," and wrote that they "are still incubating their most powerful music." At the end of 1981, Swenson wrote that "[t]he things that might have gone sour on the English Beat— their potentially narrow ska genre, their message- mongering, their stake in a movement — have all been guarded against." He noted a lightheartedness to Wha'ppen? and felt that the music is "linked to, not fettered by, ska, and their messages are delivered (again) with a degree of lightheartedness. Singers and players are darting and fluid, and this welcome effort thumbs its nose at sophomore slump."

Among retrospective reviews, Martin C. Strong wrote in The Great Rock Bible that the Beat chose to "emphasise the reggae element" of their sound with Wha'ppen?. Jo-Ann Greene of AllMusic was favourable, calling Wha'ppen? "[a] splendid album that might not have the urgency of its predecessor, but was more adventurous and twice as interesting." David Dye of NPR Music called the album a "classic." Less savoury towards the album was J. D. Considine in The New Rolling Stone Album Guide, who wrote that "although the band's musical skills are strong, the songs are disappointingly forgettable." Trouser Press said that: "Although not out of character for the group, it's the only one of their three albums that isn't essential listening." In The Rough Guide to Rock, Roger Sabin found it disappointing that the album's lyrics "express paranoia and despair in place of the old anger."

== Legacy ==
The Illustrated London News noted that, with their respective albums Wha'ppen? and Sandinista!, the Beat and the Clash became 1981's most potent bands to possess "street credibility" in their mixing of rock music with "direct social and political comment." The NME ranked Wha'ppen? at No. 4 on their top ten "Albums of the Year" for 1981 list. Hot Press named it the 15th best album of 1981. The album ranked at No. 23 on the 1981 Pazz & Jop' critics poll of the year's best albums. Robert Christgau, who curated the poll, ranked it at No. 5 on his personal "Dean's List" of the best albums of the year. In 1993, drummer Philip Selway of Radiohead listed Wha'ppen? as one of his favourite albums and as an influence. For their third album Special Beat Service (1982), also their last before their initial split, the Beat combined the musical styles of I Just Can't Stop It and Wha'ppen?.

Bob Sargeant noted that working on the album caused him to build on his fascination of ethnic sounds within his own work, where he crosses sounds from genres such as African and Creole music. He told Black Music & Jazz Review in 1983: "I enjoy crossing cultures. It's a general trend now, but I feel like I've been doing it a few years. Basically the 2-Tone explosion was the first significant musical trend to take that direction. Mind you, for me this has come probably from working with the Beat, especially Wha'ppen, that featured a lot of African rhythms, which certainly changed the aspect of things in my life." In 2012, Paris Pompor of The Sydney Morning Herald wrote how some of the album's lyrics "remain remarkably relevant: the Afghanistan-referencing 'I Am Your Flag', unemployment tune 'Get a Job' [and] 'Cheated', which was 'written about Rupert Murdoch defecating over the British media'."

== Track listing ==
All songs by the Beat, unless otherwise noted.

=== Original release ===
Side one
No.	Title	Writer(s)	Length
1.	"Doors of Your Heart"	The Beat; Colin Osborne	3:46
2.	"All Out to Get You"		2:45
3.	"Monkey Murders"		3:10
4.	"I Am Your Flag"		2:54
5.	"French Toast (Soleil Trop Chaud)"	Joseph Jefferson	3:31
6.	"Drowning"		3:53

Side two
No.	Title	Length
7.	"Dream Home in NZ"	3:11
8.	"Walk Away"	3:11
9.	"Over and Over"	2:40
10.	"Cheated"	3:28
11.	"Get-a-Job"	3:10
12.	"The Limits We Set"	4:15
Total length:		39:50

=== CD reissues ===
1999 reissue
No.	Title	Writer(s)	Length
1.	"Too Nice to Talk To" (non-album single A-side)		3:08
2.	"Doors of Your Heart"	The Beat; Colin Osborne	3:48
3.	"All Out to Get You"		2:47
4.	"Monkey Murders"		3:13
5.	"I Am Your Flag"		2:55
6.	"French Toast (Soleil Trop Chaud)"	Joseph Jefferson	3:31
7.	"Drowning"		3:52
8.	"Dream Home in NZ"		3:13
9.	"Walk Away"		3:14
10.	"Over and Over"		2:41
11.	"Cheated"		3:31
12.	"Get-a-Job"		3:13
13.	"The Limits We Set"		4:14
Total length:			43:20

2012 reissue bonus tracks
No.	Title	Length
14.	"Psychedelic Rockers"	3:52
15.	"Hit It"	3:02
16.	"Which Side of the Bed...?"	4:11

== Personnel ==
Credits are adapted from the Wha'ppen? liner notes.

The Beat

- Dave Wakeling – guitar, vocals
- Ranking Roger – vocals
- Andy Cox – guitar
- David Steele – bass
- Everett Morton – drums
- Saxa – saxophone

Additional musicians

- Dave "Blockhead" Wright – keyboards
- "Have a Go Bobby" Sargeant – marimba
- Cedric Myton – extra vocals on "Doors of Your Heart"
- Dick – steel drum
- Saltin – trumpet

Technical personnel

- Bob Sargeant – producer
- Mark Dearnley – engineer
- Hunt Emerson, the Beat – sleeve design

== Charts ==
Chart (1981)	Peak position
Australian Albums (Kent Music Report)	59
New Zealand Albums (RMNZ)	20
Swedish Albums (Sverigetopplistan)	28
UK Albums (Official Charts)	3
US Billboard 200	126
Chart (2012)	Peak position
UK Independent Albums (Official Charts)	30

== Certifications ==
Region	Certification	Certified units/sales
United Kingdom (BPI)	Silver	60,000^{^}
^{^} Shipments figures based on certification alone.
