= Stand Down Margaret =

1980 single by the Beat

Single by the Beat

from the album I Just Can't Stop It
- A-side: "Best Friend"
- Released: 8 August 1980
- Genre: Ska; 2 tone
- Length: 3:32 (dub version); 3:51 (album version)
- Label: Go-Feet (UK); Arista (Europe)
- Songwriters: Ranking Roger; Andy Cox; Everett Morton; David Steele; Dave Wakeling
- Producer: Bob Sargeant

The Beat singles chronology
"Mirror in the Bathroom" (1980)	"Best Friend" / "Stand Down Margaret" (1980)	"Too Nice to Talk To" (1980)

Official audio
- "Stand Down Margaret" on YouTube

"Stand Down Margaret" is a song by the English ska and new wave band the Beat, released as a double A-side single with "Best Friend" in August 1980. It is one of the band's most political songs, referring to the want for the then Prime Minister Margaret Thatcher to resign.

== Background and meaning ==
At the time, in the UK, there was high rates of unemployment, crime and fear of nuclear war. According to lead vocalist Dave Wakeling:

"...what most Americans didn’t see was the complete dismantling of towns and villages, of people's lives being cut short and then cutting their own lives short because they thought, like the Sex Pistols said, that there was no future. That time signalled a breaking of the English spirit, were people who used to have each other's back, and used to talk to strangers – Thatcher turned neighbours into competitors." "She broke the unions. She sold shares of companies that the people already owned, all of which flopped in value. A generation saw their parents give up on life as they saw their own opportunities stunted. They saw the town where they'd grown up dismantled. She was very divisive".

The song was inspired by the 1978 novel The Third World War by the Australian-born British soldier John Hackett, where "he postulated that the first nuclear bomb would go off above Winson Green Prison", which was right above the hospital where Wakeling was born and also above the pub where the Beat formed. According to Wakeling, the band were "very much of the mind that it was apocalypso and the world was going to end. So we thought, "There's a few things that need saying and a few dances that need to be had before we go"".

Wakeling has said that the song not only called for Thatcher to resign but also for her to "stand down as in get off your soap box. Get off your high horse. Stop trying to talk down to people. You don't really know that much more than them, anyway" as Thatcher "was acting as though she had airs and graces to the manor born". The lyrics "how can it work in this all white law" was written by Andy Cox and alludes to Thatcher's cabinet ministers Geoffrey Howe and William Whitelaw. Wakeling described this line as "one of the best satirical lyrics in literature".

== Release ==
"Stand Down Margaret" was first released on the band's debut studio album I Just Can't Stop It in May 1980 as part of a mash with "Whine and Grine", written by Prince Buster. In August 1980, a remixed dub version was released as a double A-side single with "Best Friend" as the fourth and final single from the album. The proceeds from the sales of the single went to the Anti-Nuclear Campaign and the CND.

== Critical reception ==
Reviewing the song at the time for Record Mirror, Robin Smith wrote "it washes over me not making the slightest impression on my ear drums. What these people don't seem to realise is that we have nuclear missiles because of those damn Ruskies, who are always trying to stir things up. Sucks boo to the lot of yer". However, Martyn Sutton for Melody Maker described it as having "fabulous sax passages and a fiendish beat ... and is just as effective as the original". Retrospectively, Uncut magazine described the song as "polite insurrection set to uptempo reggae and African hi-life guitar".

Left-wing singer-songwriter Billy Bragg said that he first heard "Whine and Grine/Stand Down Margaret" on The Old Grey Whistle Test and thought ""this is a nice reggae song." Then all of a sudden it started talking about white law and that pricked my ears: "Wait a minute, stand down Margaret. This is incredible". It was one of the first anti-Thatcher songs I ever heard. I went straight out and bought it".

In 2008, Conservative politician, Ed Vaizey appeared on a BBC Four documentary by Michael Portillo about Thatcher, called The Lady's Not for Spurning. In it, he said he "adored" the Beat despite being an "ardent Thatcherite" and "assumed that everyone in Britain admired Mrs Thatcher in much the same awestruck terms as he did so when it came to [the target of 'Stand Down Margaret']... the penny never really dropped. 'I couldn't work out what they had against Princess Margaret."

== Cheggers Plays Pop ==
In 1980, the Beat appeared on the children's television show Cheggers Plays Pop to play "Stand Down Margaret". During rehearsal, Keith Chegwin told Wakeling that some in the production room thought the song was about Thatcher and he asked him if it was true. Wakeling replied "Of course it's not", "it's the name of a dance from Jamaica". When the band started the song live on air, they took off their jackets to reveal t-shirts with "Margaret Thatcher as a robot with an nuclear explosion behind her".

== Charts ==
Chart (1980)	Peak position
UK Singles (OCC)	22
