= Best Friend (The Beat song) =

1980 single by The Beat

Single by the Beat

from the album I Just Can't Stop It
- A-side: "Stand Down Margaret"
- Released: 8 August 1980
- Genre: Ska; 2 tone
- Length: 3:02
- Label: Go-Feet (UK); Arista (Europe)
- Songwriters: Ranking Roger; Andy Cox; Everett Morton; David Steele; Dave Wakeling
- Producer: Bob Sargeant

The Beat singles chronology
"Mirror in the Bathroom" (1980)	"Best Friend" / "Stand Down Margaret" (1980)	"Too Nice to Talk To" (1980)

"Best Friend" is a song by the English ska and new wave band the Beat, released on 8 August 1980 as the fourth and final single from their debut studio album I Just Can't Stop It. It was released as a double A-side single with a dub version of "Stand Down Margaret". The single wasn't as successful as the band's previous singles and only peaked at number 22 on the UK singles chart. The band raised 14 thousand pounds from the sales of the single, which went to the Anti-Nuclear Campaign and the CND.

== Meaning and reception ==
Dave Wakeling said that he was "singing it to myself in the same mirror that "Mirror in the Bathroom" was written in" and that the song is about "singing a song to a reflection, you know, I just found I'm your best friend – you".

Reviewing the song for Smash Hits, David Hepworth wrote "more efficient than a Japanese watch factory, these boys continue to crank out hit product". This is another perfectly levelled 45, crisp, economical and punchy, the usual cleverly varied arrangement shifting the emphasis around a song so simple it's almost a cretin". "Like "Mirror in the Bathroom", it has an insistence to it which is further proof of The Beat's quite incredible sureness of touch". Martyn Sutton for Melody Maker described "Best Friend" as in many ways, their most commercial cut yet. The reggae and ska influences are not so apparent and the whole, attractive sound could well be labelled "Pure Pop". Fabulous rhythm, excellent guitar work and a compulsive hook". On the other hand, reviewing for Sounds, Sandy Robertson was not impressed, writing that "apart from horns, this tune could almost be a lame version of that other Beat from LA".

== Charts ==
Chart (1980)	Peak position
UK Singles (OCC)	22
