= Drowning (The Beat song) =

1981 single by the Beat

Single by the Beat

from the album Wha'ppen?
- A-side: "All Out to Get You"
- Released: 10 April 1981
- Genre: Ska; 2 tone
- Length: 3:53
- Label: Go-Feet
- Songwriter(s): Ranking Roger; Andy Cox; Everett Morton; David Steele; Dave Wakeling
- Producer(s): Bob Sargeant

The Beat singles chronology
"Too Nice to Talk To" (1980)	"Drowning" / "All Out to Get You" (1981)	"Doors of Your Heart" (1981)

"Drowning" is a song by British ska/new wave band the Beat, released in April 1981 as the first single from their second album Wha'ppen?. It was released as a double A-sided single with "All Out to Get You" and peaked at number 22 on the UK Singles Chart.

== Reception ==
Milo Miles for Rolling Stone described "Drowning" as a "suicide-is-sensuous fable about a harried organization man's death fantasy" and "All Out to Get You" as "[spotlighting] the tensions of adolescence raised to the breaking point by a society in unquiet desperation".

Mark Cooper reviewing for Record Mirror wrote "Drowning has always been a fair enough description of the Beat sensation at its best and their best this is. Sometimes its a pleasure to go under. An utterly original melody, a lazy but taut feel, Saxa's sexy sax, Roger's toasting interlude and a treated riff that surprises and then brings smiles and you realise how preferable 'Drowning' is to sailing". However, he described "All Out to Get You" as "ordinary by comparison, a standard piece of Beat meat, in fact a rewrite of 'Too Nice To Talk To'. You can hear this is the rhythm of the title. But so what, the Beat continue to transform themselves while remaining charming and 'Drowning' will be huge".

== Track listing ==
7": Go Feet / Feet 6

1. "Drowning" – 3:53
2. "All Out to Get You" – 2:45

== Charts ==
Chart (1981)	Peak position
Ireland (IRMA)	18
UK Singles (OCC)	22
