= Mirror in the Bathroom =

Single by The Beat

- One of UK vinyl editions

Single by The Beat

from the album I Just Can't Stop It
- B-side: "Jackpot"
- Released: 25 April 1980
- Genre: Ska; pop; two-tone; new wave
- Length: 3:10
- Label: Go-Feet
- Songwriters: Ranking Roger; Andy Cox; Everett Morton; David Steele; Dave Wakeling
- Producer: Bob Sargeant

The Beat singles chronology
"Hands Off...She's Mine" / "Twist and Crawl" (1980)	"Mirror in the Bathroom" (1980)	"Best Friend" / "Stand Down Margaret" (1980)

Music video
- The English Beat - Mirror in the Bathroom (Official) on YouTube

"Mirror in the Bathroom (Mark "Spike" Stent Remix)"

Single by the Beat

from the album B.P.M.: The Very Best of the Beat
- Released: 19 October 1995
- Recorded: 1980, 1995
- Genre: Ska; dub; jungle
- Length: 3:28
- Label: Go-Feet; BMG
- Songwriters: Ranking Roger; Andy Cox; Everett Morton; David Steele; Dave Wakeling

The Beat singles chronology
"Ackee-1-2-3" (1983)	"Mirror in the Bathroom (Mark "Spike" Stent Remix)" (1995)	"Mirror in the Bathroom CD2" (1996)

"Mirror in the Bathroom" is a single by the English ska band the Beat, released as a single in 1980 from their debut studio album I Just Can't Stop It. It reached number 4 on the UK singles chart and consequently was their highest charting release in the UK until 1983. It was released again in 1995 as a 12" single and early in 1996 as a CD single (both containing contemporary club remixes) to promote B.P.M.: The Very Best of the Beat. The reissued single reached number 44 in 1996.

The song was ranked at #3 among the top ten "Tracks of the Year" for 1980 by NME.

== Composition ==
According to composer and singer Dave Wakeling,

The lyrics were written when I was working on a construction site. I’d had a couple of drinks the night before, and forgot to hang up my clothes to dry for the next day.... I was shaving in the mirror, with the hangover and the wet clothes, and the thought of trying to break up frozen sand to put into the concrete machine was not that tasty. And I started talking to myself in the mirror, and said, “Dave, we don’t have to do this, mate. We don’t have to do this.” And in the mirror behind me, the door of the bathroom had a tiny little latch on it, and I said to myself, “The door’s locked. There’s only me and you. Just me and you here. We don’t have to do this.” And of course we did, because we needed money for Guinness that night.

On his way to work on his motorbike, he thought about the idea of "The door is locked, just you and me"; and reflected on the nature of narcissism:

And you'd see it perhaps on Saturday afternoon with people window shopping, half the time they're actually just looking at their own reflection. Then this restaurant opened, and it was a big deal at the time because it had glass tables, and I was like, oh, you can watch yourself.

When he first heard David Steele's "revolutionary" 2/2 bassline, he thought, "Wow, that poem I was writing on the motorbike fits it like a glove."

The title of the song led some to believe, mistakenly, that it was about drawing lines of cocaine on a mirror. Wakeling says that "in America in the early '80s, everybody gave me knowing winks and said, 'Oh, I know what that one's about, then, Dave.' And it wasn't that mirror in the bathroom at all, it was the one on the wall, and not the one on your knee."

== Release ==
Jerry Dammers wanted the Beat to release "Mirror in the Bathroom" as their first single for his company 2 Tone Records, but Chrysalis Records, 2 Tone's parent company, refused to allow them to release it as a single. Instead, they released a ska version of the Smokey Robinson and the Miracles song "The Tears of a Clown". When that record was successful, the Beat formed their own label, Go-Feet Records, which released "Mirror in the Bathroom". It was released in April 1980 and reached No. 4 in the UK Singles Chart.

== Critical reception ==
"Mirror in the Bathroom" was ranked at No. 3 in the NME "Tracks of the Year" list for 1980, and at No. 24 in Sounds magazine's "Singles of the Year" list for 1980. In 2003, Q magazine ranked the song at No. 517 in their list of the "1001 Best Songs Ever". In 2002, Gary Mulholland included the song in his list This is Uncool: The 500 Greatest Singles Since Punk and Disco.

== Later releases ==
The single was re-released on 21 April 2012 for Record Store Day 2012 as a limited edition 750 run of 7" copies. Its B-side is "Too Nice to Talk To".

Ranking Roger's album Pop Off the Head Top includes a new remix version of "Mirror in the Bathroom" produced by Gaudi.

The song is included in the soundtracks of the films Someone to Watch Over Me (1987), Grosse Pointe Blank (1997), and SLC Punk! (1999), by a project called Fifi.

== 1990s reissues ==
12" single, 74321232061 (1995)

1. "Mirror in the Bathroom" (Sure Is Pure Remix)
2. "Mirror in the Bathroom" (Tic Tac Toe Remix)
3. "Mirror in the Bathroom" (Simon and Diamond Remix)
4. "Mirror in the Bathroom" (Adelphi Remix)

A promo 12" containing only the first two tracks (VAIN 001) was also released.

CD single, 74321232062 (January 8, 1996)

1. "Mirror in the Bathroom" (Mark "Spike" Stent Remix) — 3:28
2. "Mirror in the Bathroom" (Tic Tac Toe Remix) — 5:41
3. "Mirror in the Bathroom" (Adelphi Remix) — 4:45
4. "Mirror in the Bathroom" (Original Version) — 3:08

== Charts ==
Chart (1980)	Peak position
UK Singles (OCC)	4
US Dance Club Songs (Billboard)	22

Chart (1996)	Peak position
UK Singles (OCC)	44

== Certifications ==
Region	Certification	Certified units/sales
United Kingdom (BPI)	Silver	200,000^{‡}
^{‡} Sales+streaming figures based on certification alone.
