= Too Nice to Talk To =

1980 single by The Beat

- UK vinyl cover

Single by The Beat
- B-side: "Psychedelic Rockers"
- Released: 5 December 1980
- Studio: Townhouse, London
- Genre: Ska; 2 tone
- Length: 3:08
- Label: Go-Feet
- Songwriter(s): Ranking Roger; Andy Cox; Everett Morton; David Steele; Dave Wakeling
- Producer(s): Bob Sargeant

The Beat singles chronology
"Best Friend" / "Stand Down Margaret (Dub)" (1980)	"Too Nice to Talk To" (1980)	"Drowning" / "All Out to Get You" (1981)

"Too Nice to Talk To" is a non-album single by British ska/new wave band The Beat, released on 5 December 1980 by Go-Feet Records. It peaked at number 7 on the UK Singles Chart. The song has since been included on CD reissues of the band's second album Wha'ppen?.

== Reception and meaning ==
In his review of the song in Record Mirror, Mike Gardner said "I really can't muster much enthusiasm for a single that is so beautifully produced with layers and whirls of aural texture but goes nowhere beyond decoration. A disappointment." Reviewing the song retrospectively for AllMusic, Jo-Ann Greene said "the whole number positively simmers, fueled by the hand drums that give the piece an Afro-beat feel, and sizzling into the clubs via the roiling bass, driving guitar riff and insistent keyboards, all brought to a boil by the vehement bass line."

Dave Wakeling says that the inspiration comes from a nightclub in Birmingham called Barbarella's, where "they used to have this dastardly trick at 20 past 2 every morning, because they closed at 2:30, it didn't matter what was happening, whatever record was playing, they would just scratch the record off and turn on the lights"..."it was a story really about wanting to go and dance with somebody and just spending too long, and going over in your mind what you would say, or what you ought to say, or having your friends going, 'Go on, go and talk to her.' And you waited that long for it, you took a big breath and strode towards the dance floor, all the lights in the club went on and the record got scratched up, 'Okay, thank you, good night.' Oh, it's too late now, it's 20 past 2, I've spent all night just watching you. But yeah, it's to do with that shyness to the point of discomfort. And then finally making the bold move just a moment too late."

== Track listings ==
Two versions of the 7-inch single were released, both with the same catalogue number. The second version is a dub version that has less vocals on it, titled with the parenthesised "Dubweiser". A 12-inch single was also released, but only of the dub version.

7": Go Feet / Feet 4

- "Too Nice to Talk To" – 3:08
- "Psychedelic Rockers" – 3:54

7": Go Feet / Feet 4

- "Too Nice to Talk To" (Dubweiser) – 3:08
- "Psychedelic Rockers" (Dubweiser) – 3:54

12": Go Feet / Feet 124

- "Too Nice to Talk To" (Dubweiser) – 4:58
- "Psychedelic Rockers" (Dubweiser) – 5:30

12" Promo: Sire / PRO-A-988 (US, 1981)

- "Too Nice to Talk To" – 5:00
- "Mirror in the Bathroom" – 3:07
- "Walk Away" – 3:10

12" Promo: I.R.S. / SP-70970 (US, 1983)

- "Too Nice to Talk To" – 3:05
- "Too Nice to Talk To" (Extended Version) – 5:00
- "Best Friend" – 3:00

== Charts ==
Chart (1981)	Peak position
Australia (Kent Music Report)	73
Ireland (IRMA)	6
UK Singles (OCC)	7
