= Special Beat Service =

Studio album by the Beat
- Released: 1 October 1982
- Studio: Roundhouse Studios (London)
- Genres: New wave; pop rock
- Length: 39:52
- Labels: Go-Feet; I.R.S.
- Producers: Bob Sargeant; Ranking Roger and Mike Hedges (only "Pato and Roger a Go Talk")

The Beat chronology
Wha'ppen? (1981)	Special Beat Service (1982)	What Is Beat? (1983)

Singles from Special Beat Service
- 1. "Save It for Later" Released: 2 April 1982; 2. "Jeanette" Released: 3 September 1982; 3. "I Confess" Released: 26 November 1982

Special Beat Service is the third studio album by the English ska band the Beat, released on 1 October 1982 by Go-Feet Records. Like the rest of their material, it was released in the US under the name "the English Beat". It peaked at No. 39 on the Billboard 200 album chart in 1983 on the strength of two singles, "I Confess" and "Save It for Later," the music videos for which received modest airplay on the fledgling MTV video network.

== Critical reception ==
Professional ratings
Review scores
Source	Rating
AllMusic	4.5/5 stars
Christgau's Record Guide	A−
The Encyclopedia of Popular Music	3/5 stars
Record Mirror	5/5 stars
Rolling Stone	4/5 stars
The Rolling Stone Album Guide	4/5 stars
Smash Hits	9/10
Sounds	3.5/5 stars
Spin Alternative Record Guide	8/10

The Spin Alternative Record Guide wrote that "'Save It for Later' and 'End of the Party' are romantic, piano-driven pop gems." Rolling Stone said that "'Special Beat Service' sparkles with surprising touches"

== Track listing ==
All tracks are written by the Beat (as per ASCAP: Roger Charlery, Andy Cox, Everett Morton, David Steele and Dave Wakeling), except where noted.

Side one
No.	Title	Length
1.	"I Confess"	4:34
2.	"Jeanette"	2:46
3.	"Sorry"	2:33
4.	"Sole Salvation"	3:05
5.	"Spar Wid Me"	4:32
6.	"Rotating Head"	3:24

Side two
No.	Title	Writer(s)	Length
7.	"Save It for Later"		3:34
8.	"She's Going"		2:10
9.	"Pato and Roger Ago Talk"	Pato Banton; Charlery; Cox; Morton; Steele; Wakeling	3:19
10.	"Sugar and Stress"	Charlery; Cox; Morton; Steele; Wakeling; Wesley Magoogan	2:57
11.	"End of the Party"		3:32
12.	"Ackee 1-2-3"		3:12
Total length:			39:52

2012 reissue bonus tracks
No.	Title	Writer(s)	Length
13.	"What's Your Best Thing"		3:47
14.	"March of the Swivel Heads"		3:31
15.	"Cool Entertainer"		3:32
16.	"Ago Talk" (Tappy-Luppy Dub)	Banton; Charlery; Cox; Morton; Steele; Wakeling	8:38

== Personnel ==
Credits are adapted from the Special Beat Service liner notes.

The Beat

- Ranking Roger – toasting; vocals; percussion
- Dave Wakeling – vocals; guitar
- David Steele – bass; banjo
- Andy Cox – guitar; mandolin
- Everett Morton – drums
- Saxa – saxophone
- Wesley Magoogan – clarinet; lyricon; saxophone; sax FX unit
- Dave "Blockhead" Wright – keyboards; piano

Additional musicians

- Bob Sargeant – telephone; marimba
- Marc Fox – percussion
- Jack Emblow – accordion
- Markandey Mishra – tabla
- Vince Sullivan – trombone
- Dave Lord – trumpet
- Steve Sidwell – trumpet
- Pato Banton – toasting

Production and artwork

- Bob Sargeant – producer
- Trevor Hallesy – engineer
- Mark Dearnley – engineer
- Brian Gaylor – engineer
- Ian Cooper – cutting engineer
- Mike Hedges – producer ("Pato and Roger a Go Talk")
- Ranking Roger – producer ("Pato and Roger a Go Talk")
- Martyn Atkins – art direction
- Nick Rogers – supervisor

== Charts ==
Chart (1982)	Peak position
New Zealand Albums (RMNZ)	50
UK Albums (Official Charts)	21
US Billboard 200	39
