= Saxa (musician) =

Jamaican saxophonist (1930–2017)

- Also known as: Saxa
- Born: Lional Augustus Martin; 5 January 1930; Croft's Hill, Jamaica
- Died: 3 May 2017 (aged 87)
- Genres: Ska, reggae, 2-tone
- Instrument: Saxophone
- Years active: 1950s–2004
- Formerly of: The Beat

Lionel Augustus "Saxa" Martin (5 January 1930 – 3 May 2017) was a Jamaican saxophonist, best known for being a member of The Beat.

== Early life ==
Lionel Augustus Martin was born at Croft's Hill, Jamaica he originally played on a homemade bamboo saxophone, but later switched to the drums. He moved to Kingston, where he played saxophone in Spanish Town under the names Ganzi and Count Moody. While in Kingston, he learned the tenor saxophone and recorded with Tommy McCook and Roland Alphonso.

== Move to England ==
He moved to England in 1960, spending eighteen months in London and then moved to Birmingham. He split the bill with The Beatles at The Continental, a club in Soho Road, Handsworth.. Saxa also played saxophone for Prince Buster, Laurel Aitken, and Desmond Dekker.

== The Beat ==
Martin joined The Beat in 1978 to help them record their first single, a cover of "The Tears of a Clown" by Smokey Robinson & The Miracles, in 1980. He initially joined as a session musician, but soon became a full-time member. Saxa was a generation older than the rest of the band.

Rolling Stone described his saxophone playing on the Beat's I Just Can't Stop It album: "a rambunctious cluster of singles held together by tenor saxophonist Saxa's winning, authoritative blowing and a rhythm section...that cared more about adventure than duplicating antique reggae."

Saxa retired from touring in 1982 due to poor health, and his live replacement was Wesley Magoogan. The Beat disbanded in 1983.

== Later career ==
After touring with Tony Beet in 1990, Saxa, Beet and The Beat drummer Everett Morton formed International Beat, who recorded an album and toured until 1995.

== Death ==
After the death of his wife in 2004, Saxa started drinking heavily and disappeared for long spans of times, and fake reports of his death spread among radio stations.

Saxa had three children, one who lives in Jamaica, and two who he had in England with Peggy. Saxa passed away in his sleep on 3 May 2017, aged 87.
