= Hunt Emerson =

English cartoonist (born 1952)

- Born: 1952 (age 73–74) Newcastle upon Tyne, England
- Areas: Cartoonist, Artist
- Notable works: Firkin the Cat

Hunt Emerson's cover art for Diceman no. 5

Hunt Emerson (born 1952) is an English cartoonist. He was closely involved with the Birmingham Arts Lab of the mid-to-late 1970s, and with the British underground comics scene of the 1970s and 1980s. His many comic strips and graphic novels have been translated into numerous languages.

== Biography ==
His earliest strips in the 1970s appeared in such British small press comics as Graphixus, Brainstorm Comix, Moon Comix, Yikes, Animal Bite Comix, No Ducks, Phobos, Streetcomix, Free Comix, Warrior and Fish.

A trip to the US put Emerson in touch with the underground comix publisher Rip Off Press, which published his Thunderdogs title; while Don and Maggie Thompson included him in their mini-comic series, for which he created Calculus Cat. Emerson's art also appeared in the US underground/alternative anthologies Commies from Mars and Eclipse Monthly. Dogman, and Large Cow Comix (a five issue series with separate subtitles) were all Emerson work cover to cover, but it was Knockabout Comics, a British comic book-sized, and later album-sized, anthology that featured some of Emerson's most notable strips, including the characters Alan Rabbit, Calculus Cat, Max Zillion & Alto Ego, Pusspuss, Momo and Fuzi, Charlie Chirp, plus the one-shot stories "Cakes And Bricks," "The Dentist," and "Mouth City". The latter two stories spawned a series called Citymouth, and later a collected volume.

== Works ==
Square-bound books written by others, such as You Are Maggie Thatcher and Hard To Swallow, showcase Emerson strips and illustrations throughout. In Outrageous Tales From the Old Testament he tackled a version of the Book of Leviticus written by Alan Moore, and in The Seven Deadly Sins, depicted "Envy". For the DC Comics imprint Factoid Books, in the 1990s, he did biographical comics on everything from Erich von Stroheim to Prince Charles and Princess Diana. These appeared in The Big Book Of series. For dozens of issues of the British underground Brain Damage, he created "Arsover Tit".

The Emerson graphic novels Lady Chatterley's Lover, The Rime of the Ancient Mariner, Casanova's Last Stand and other adaptations of classic novels and tales have been sold in numerous countries, and translated into several different languages.

For over 30 years Hunt Emerson's strips and illustrations have appeared in Fortean Times, a magazine of occult and unexplained phenomena, while his pornographically humorous Firkin the Cat (written by Tym Manley) has appeared in hundreds of Fiesta magazines.

He drew the cover design for Terry McCann's 1975 album Stand Back It's Rent-a-Crowd. He designed the 'Beat Girl' icon for Birmingham band The Beat. and painted a mural of the band, which was used as cover art for the band's second album Wha'ppen?.

In 2016, he designed the Walsall Silver Thread Tapestries.

Emerson drew and created "Ratz" for The Beano, a strip about mean rats in a sewer. In 2002–2007, he drew Little Plum for that comic. In March 2009, he revived the "Fred's Bed" strip.

== Politics ==
In a 2019 interview, the anarchist cartoonist Donald Rooum described himself as an admirer of Emerson, having taken out a subscription to the Fortean Times purely to read his work. More explicitly, a New Politics article identified Emerson as a fellow anarchist cartoonist alongside Rooum, among others. Emerson had previously exhibited work at the British Library show Comics Unmasked: Art and Anarchy in the UK, and would later contribute work to an exhibition about the Victorian radical John Ruskin. Emerson himself has described ignoring high politics, instead choosing to focus on community-based work. He has also said that explicitly political work of his, such as a Titan Books publication with Pat Mills about Margaret Thatcher, have become dated too quickly as politics moves on.
