= Hands Off...She's Mine =

1980 single by The Beat

- UK vinyl cover

Single by the Beat

from the album I Just Can't Stop It
- B-side: "Twist and Crawl" (released as a double A-side in the UK)
- Released: 14 February 1980
- Genre: Ska; pop; 2 tone
- Length: 3:01 (7" & album version); 4:34 (12" version)
- Label: Go-Feet (UK); Arista (Europe)
- Songwriters: Ranking Roger; Andy Cox; Everett Morton; David Steele; Dave Wakeling
- Producer: Bob Sargeant

The Beat singles chronology
"Tears of a Clown" / "Ranking Full Stop" (1979)	"Hands Off...She's Mine" / "Twist and Crawl" (1980)	"Mirror in the Bathroom" (1980)

"Hands Off...She's Mine" is the second single by the English ska and new wave band the Beat, released on 14 February 1980 as the first single from their debut album I Just Can't Stop It. The single was successful, peaking at No. 9 on the UK singles chart.

== Release ==
The single was the first release on the band's newly created record label Go-Feet and was released as a double A-sided single with "Twist and Crawl" in the UK as there were opposing thoughts in the band as to which song should be the A-side. A 12" extended dub mix of the single was released on 22 February 1980, a week after the release of the 7" single.

== Critical reception ==
In his review of the song in Record Mirror, journalist John Shearlaw wrote "Why then is this turgid, beatless, tuneless, production-less mere germ of an idea (that could turn into a song if they sat down and worked on it for about a year) allowed to be released to pervert the minds of the nation's youth?". Reviewing the song retrospectively for AllMusic, Jo-Ann Greene said that the "rich and fulsome arrangement blends a driving spot-on rhythm, tuneful riffing that dances merrily around the melody, fabulous sax solos, and sweetened by a xylophone-esque line that gives the piece a further Caribbean flair".

Dave Wakeling later said that some people took the meaning of the song completely wrong, saying that "It was meant obviously to mean the opposite. Of course she’s not yours. Nobody is ever anybody else’s, are they? And some people got it, but some girls were really offended. They were like, "I can’t believe you’d come up with something like that! 'Hands Off, She’s Mine'. What nonsense!" I’m like, "Yes. That’s the point. It’s nonsense.""

== Popular culture ==
- The song appeared in the episode "The War Room" of the 1986 crime thriller TV mini-series Dead Head.
- The song is featured in the 2004 romantic comedy film 50 First Dates.
- It is featured in the film and on the soundtrack of the 2007 comedy-drama Mama's Boy.

== "Twist and Crawl" ==
In an interview with Songfacts, Wakeling said "it was actually a friend of David Steele's, the bass player, Peter Greenall, wrote the lyrics", and Wakeling "filled out the lyrics" and "made it scan a bit more". The song is about "somebody wanting to be in the Twist and Shout kind of casual '60s confidence, but found that it was more like twist and crawl. Just social discomfort to the point of pitiful pain of always feeling you're in the wrong place at the wrong time and saying the wrong thing to the wrong person. Never getting anywhere with it."

== Track listing ==
7"

- "Hands Off..She's Mine" – 3:01
- "Twist and Crawl" – 2:30

12"

- "Hands Off..She's Mine" – 4:34
- "Twist and Crawl" – 4:58

== Charts ==
Chart (1980)	Peak position
Ireland (IRMA)	1
Netherlands (Dutch Top 40)	35
Netherlands (Single Top 100)	41
UK Singles (Official Charts)	9
US Dance Club Songs (Billboard)	22
