= I Just Can't Stop It =

Studio album by the Beat
- Released: 23 May 1980
- Genres: Ska; two-tone; new wave
- Length: 36:24
- Labels: Go-Feet; Sire
- Producer: Bob Sargeant

The Beat chronology
I Just Can't Stop It (1980)	Wha'ppen? (1981)

Singles from I Just Can't Stop It
- 1. "Tears of a Clown"/"Ranking Full Stop" Released: 30 November 1979; 2. "Hands Off...She's Mine"/"Twist and Crawl" Released: 14 February 1980; 3. "Mirror in the Bathroom" Released: 25 April 1980; 4. "Best Friend"/"Stand Down Margaret" Released: 8 August 1980

I Just Can't Stop It is the debut studio album by the English two-tone band the Beat, released on 23 May 1980 by Go-Feet Records in the United Kingdom. It was released the same year in the United States on Sire Records, with the band credited as "The English Beat"; in Australia, it was released on Go-Feet under the band name "The British Beat".

The album was well received; Rolling Stone raved that the music was "wild and threatening, sexy and sharp," while AllMusic later wrote it "was a stunning achievement" which had not been diminished by time.

The album was reissued on CD in 1990 on I.R.S. Records in the U.S., in 1999 on London Records, and in 2012 by Edsel Records in the UK and Shout! Factory in the U.S.

== Artwork ==
The "Beat Girl" icon seen on the cover and used on the band's merchandising was designed by Birmingham-based cartoonist Hunt Emerson.

== Critical reception ==
Professional ratings
Review scores
Source	Rating
AllMusic	5/5 stars
Christgau's Record Guide	A−
Encyclopedia of Popular Music	4/5 stars
Record Mirror	2/5 stars
The Rolling Stone Album Guide	5/5 stars
Smash Hits	9/10
Sounds	4/5 stars
Spin Alternative Record Guide	10/10
Tom Hull – on the Web	A−

At the end of 1980, I Just Can't Stop It appeared in numerous lists of the best albums of the year: NME ranked it third, Sounds ranked it 13th, The Village Voice ranked it 21st and OOR ranked it 41st. In 1995, Spin ranked the album at No. 94 in its list of the "Top 100 Alternative Albums". Fast 'n' Bulbous ranked the album at number 283 in its list of "The 500 Best Albums Since 1965". A 2002 poll of KCPR DJs ranked it at No. 40 in a list of the "Top 100 Records of the 80s". Les Inrockuptibles included it in its list of "50 Years of Rock 'n' Roll." Music journalist Simon Reynolds lists it as one of the five most important albums of "2-Tone and the Ska Resurrection" in his 2005 book Rip It Up and Start Again: Postpunk 1978–1984. In 2016, Paste ranked I Just Can't Stop It at No. 48 on its list of the 50 best new wave albums.

"Mirror in the Bathroom" was ranked at No. 3 in the NME "Singles of the Year" list and at No. 24 in Sounds' "Singles of the Year" list. In 2003, Q ranked the song at No. 517 in its list of the "1001 Best Songs Ever". In 2002, Gary Mulholland included the song in his list This Is Uncool: The 500 Greatest Singles Since Punk and Disco. In 2001, Michaelangelo Matos included it in his list of "The Top 100 Singles of the 80s." In 2006, 97x ranked it at No. 186 in its list of "The 500 Best Modern Rock Songs of All Time." In 1990, Robert Christgau ranked "Twist & Crawl" at No. 10 in his list of the best songs of the 1980s.

== Track listing ==
All tracks are written by The Beat (as per ASCAP: Roger Charlery, Andy Cox, Everett Morton, David Steele and Dave Wakeling), except where noted. Note that despite the group author credits on the label, Saxa is not listed as a co-author of any song according to ASCAP.

Original UK release
No.	Title	Writer(s)	Length
1.	"Mirror in the Bathroom"		3:10
2.	"Hands Off...She's Mine"		3:01
3.	"Two Swords"		2:19
4.	"Twist & Crawl"	The Beat; Dick Bradsell	2:35
5.	"Rough Rider" (originally performed by Prince Buster & the All Stars)	Eddy Grant; Patrick Grant; Dervan Gordon; Lincoln Gordon	4:53
6.	"Click Click"		1:28
7.	"Big Shot"		2:34
8.	"Whine & Grine/Stand Down Margaret" ("Whine & Grine" originally performed by Prince Buster & the All Stars)	The Beat; Prince Buster	3:51
9.	"Noise in This World"		2:19
10.	"Can't Get Used to Losing You" (originally performed by Andy Williams)	Doc Pomus; Mort Shuman	3:04
11.	"Best Friend"		3:01
12.	"Jackpot" (originally performed by the Pioneers)	George Agard; Sydney Crooks; Jackie Robinson	4:19

The U.S. release of the album on Sire Records added "Tears of a Clown" and "Ranking Full Stop", originally released as double A-sides of a single on 2 Tone Records in 1979 (TT 6). These tracks remained on most subsequent CD reissues of the album, the exception being the 1999 London Records edition.

US LP release and CD reissues
No.	Title	Writer(s)	Length
1.	"Mirror in the Bathroom"		3:10
2.	"Hands Off...She's Mine"		3:01
3.	"Two Swords"		2:19
4.	"Twist & Crawl"	The Beat; Dick Bradsell	2:35
5.	"Tears of a Clown" (originally performed by Smokey Robinson and the Miracles)	Henry Cosby; Smokey Robinson; Stevie Wonder	2:39
6.	"Rough Rider"	Eddy Grant; Patrick Grant; Dervan Gordon; Lincoln Gordon	4:53
7.	"Click Click"		1:28
8.	"Ranking Full Stop"		2:44
9.	"Big Shot"		2:34
10.	"Whine & Grine/Stand Down Margaret"	The Beat; Prince Buster	3:51
11.	"Noise in This World"		2:19
12.	"Can't Get Used to Losing You"	Doc Pomus; Mort Shuman	3:04
13.	"Best Friend"		3:01
14.	"Jackpot"	George Agard; Sydney Crooks; Jackie Robinson	4:19

== Personnel ==
Credits are adapted from the album's liner notes.

The Beat

- Dave Wakeling – lead vocals, rhythm guitar
- Ranking Roger – toasting, vocals
- Andy Cox – lead guitar
- David Steele – bass guitar
- Everett Morton – drums
- Saxa – saxophone

Production and artwork

- Bob Sargeant – production
- Alvin Clark – engineering
- Mark Dearnley – engineering
- Mike Dunne – engineering
- Trevor Hallesy – engineering
- Nick Rogers – engineering
- Hunt Emerson – artwork

"Thanks to: John Peel, the Specials, Selecter, A/W Hunt Emerson"

== Charts ==
Chart (1980–81)	Peak position
Australian Albums (Kent Music Report)	66
New Zealand Albums (RMNZ)	30
Norwegian Albums (VG-lista)	30
UK Albums (Official Charts)	3
US Billboard 200	142

== Certifications ==
Region	Certification	Certified units/sales
United Kingdom (BPI)	Gold	100,000^{^}
^{^} Shipments figures based on certification alone.
