= I Confess (The Beat song) =

1982 song written and recorded by The Beat

Single by the Beat

from the album Special Beat Service
- B-side: "Sole Salvation"
- Released: 26 November 1982
- Genre: New wave; sophisti-pop
- Length: 4:34
- Label: Go-Feet
- Songwriter: The Beat
- Producer: Bob Sargeant

The Beat singles chronology
"Jeanette" (1982)	"I Confess" (1982)	"Can't Get Used to Losing You" (1983)

Music video
- "I Confess" on YouTube

"I Confess" is a 1982 song written and recorded by the English ska band the Beat (known in the United States and Canada as the English Beat). The song was released as a single from the band's third and final studio album, Special Beat Service, finding moderate chart success in the UK. Inspired by the romantic escapades of English tabloids and Wakeling's own personal relationships, the song featured a piano performance led by touring keyboardist Dave "Blockhead" Wright.

As the album's third single, "I Confess" found moderate success on the charts, peaking at No. 54 on the UK singles chart. The song was praised by critics. A music video for the track was also produced, featuring the band's parody of the New Romantics.

== Background ==
Lyrically, "I Confess" was a mix of Beat frontman Dave Wakeling's personal experiences and sensationalized stories that he had read in magazines. Wakeling had been a frequent reader of these magazines; he recalled, "At the same time, I had a bit of an obsession with what was called 'Photo Love' in England. They were those teen magazines where they had photographs with bubbles coming out of their mouths. Broken hearts and redemption, that sort of thing. I loved the cloying, hyper-driven emotion of them, and I'd had my photograph as a pin-up in a couple of them". Wakeling then connected his "own tawdry tales of young love" with a tabloid story about a man who "had been caught having sex with his new bride's sister on their wedding day".

Musically, the song had originated from a riff composed by Beat touring keyboardist Dave "Blockhead" Wright. Wright had filled in for Beat saxophonist Saxa and introduced a piano part he had composed to Wakeling. Wakeling explained,

One day I heard [Wright] playing a tune. I was like, 'Ooh that's nice, what's that?' He said, 'Oh, just this little calypso thing, I've had it in my head for ages.' I was like, 'It's fantastic, can you make a cassette of that?' It had all the charm of calypso, but the drama of Wuthering Heights, I thought, with the chord changes.

Wakeling compared David Steele's bass part to Chic.

== Release and critical reception ==
"I Confess" was released as the third single from Special Beat Service (1982), with "Sole Salvation" on the B-side. The single peaked at number 54 on the UK singles chart. AllMusic's Stewart Mason pointed to the song's atypical lyrics and musical style as off-putting for some Beat fans, leading to a level of skepticism toward the song. In the US, the track went to number 34 on the Billboard Dance/Disco Top 80 chart.

"I Confess" has seen positive critical reception since its release. Mason said of the track, "It's actually a startlingly well-constructed song, as well as one of the group's most unforgettable singles", while fellow AllMusic writer Jo-Ann Greene praised its "Joe Jackson-esque piano line".

In a 1982 interview, Elvis Costello praised the song as "one of the most beautiful bits of singing I've heard all year". Wakeling had previously named Costello's "Secondary Modern" as one of his all-time top ten favorite songs.

== Music video ==
The song's single release was accompanied by a music video. Wakeling recalled that the video satirized the "New Romantic" style that had been gaining in popularity during the early 1980s. He explained,

The video was a bit of a take on 'The New Romantics'. ... We were getting pretty jealous of them, y'know, because they'd stolen our thunder. We looked like a bunch of plumbers on the unemployment line in comparison. We were like, 'Y'know, everybody goes through a phase of trying on their mum's clothes, and a little bit of makeup when she's out, but the idea is to get them back in the wardrobe and get your face washed before she gets home. You're not meant to go on TV like that, are you?' So we sort of camped it up a bit for that video, which was our mocking criticism, and that went completely over people's heads as well. [Laughs.] We heard, 'Oh, you look gorgeous!' Nooooo!
