= Go-Feet Records =

UK record label

Go-Feet Records was an English record label founded by, and predominantly used to release recordings by, the ska revival band the Beat (known as the English Beat in North America). The band had some chart success in the United Kingdom in the 1980s. The label also released a few recordings by other bands. The Beat's first release was on 2 Tone Records, but when Madness struck a deal with Stiff Records, the Beat left to form their own label. As of 2025, The Beat's catalogue now operates under Warner Music Group's Rhino Entertainment.

The label was distributed over the years by labels such as Arista, London, Edsel, and BMG Rights Management.

== Albums ==
- The Beat: I Just Can't Stop It (BEAT 1, 1980)
- The Congos: Heart of the Congos (BEAT 2, 1980 reissue)
- The Beat: Wha'ppen? (BEAT 3, 1981)
- Cedric Myton & The Congos: Face the Music (BEAT 4, 1981)
- The Beat: Special Beat Service (BEAT 5, 1982)
- The Beat: What Is Beat? (BEAT 6, 1983 compilation)

== 7" singles ==
Cat No	Artist	A Side	B Side	Comment
Feet 01	The Beat	"Hands Off...She's Mine"	"Twist and Crawl"	
Feet 02	The Beat	"Mirror in the Bathroom"	"Jackpot"	
Feet 03	The Beat	"Best Friend"	"Stand Down Margaret (Dub)"	
Feet 04	The Beat	"Too Nice to Talk To"	"Psychedelic Rockers"	
Feet 04	The Beat	"Too Nice to Talk To" (dubweiser)	"Psychedelic Rockers" (dubweiser)	Different Version but same catalogue number
Feet 05	The Congos	"Fisherman"	"Can't Come In"	
Feet 06	The Beat	"All Out to Get You"	"Drowning"	
Feet 07	The Mood Elevators	"Annapurna"	"Driving By Night"	
Feet 08	Not Released			
Feet 09	The Beat	"Doors of Your Heart"	"Get A Job"	
Feet 10	Cedric Myton And The Congos	"Can't Take It Away"	"Where He Leads Me"	
Feet 11	The Beat	"Hit It"	"Which Side of the Bed...?"	
Feet 12	Unreleased			
Feet 333	The Beat	"Save It for Later"	"What's Your Best Thing?"	
Feet 14	Pato And Roger	"Pato and Roger (Ago Talk)"	"Cool Entertainer"	
Feet 15	The Beat	"Jeanette"	"March of the Swivel Heads"	
Feet 16	The Beat	"I Confess"	"Sole Salvation"	With Live Single BLS16
Feet 17	The Beat	"Can't Get Used to Losing You (1983 Remix)"	"Spar Wid Me"	
Feet 18	The Beat	"Ackee 1–2–3"	"Monkey Murders"	

== See also ==
- Lists of record labels
