= Save It for Later =

Single by the Beat

from the album Special Beat Service
- B-side: "What's Your Best Thing?"
- Released: 2 April 1982
- Studio: Roundhouse Studios (London)
- Genre: Rock; new wave; pop; ska
- Length: 3:34
- Label: Go-Feet
- Songwriter: The Beat
- Producer: Bob Sargeant

The Beat singles chronology
"Hit It (Auto Erotic)" (1981)	"Save It for Later" (1982)	"Jeanette" (1982)

Music video
- "Save It for Later" on YouTube

"Save It for Later" is a 1982 song written and recorded by the English ska and new wave band the Beat (known in the United States and Canada as the English Beat). The song was released as a single from the band's third and final studio album, Special Beat Service (1982), finding moderate chart success in Britain.

Written by Beat guitarist Dave Wakeling before the band was founded, the song nearly went unreleased due to opposition from bassist David Steele. After pressure from Wakeling and the record company, it was ultimately recorded for the band's third studio album and has since become one of the band's most famous tracks. It has been featured in various soundtracks and compilation albums.

"Save It for Later" is also notable for its unique tuning, which was achieved accidentally. The track's lyrics highlight the suggestive double entendre of the song's title.

== Background ==
"Save It for Later" was written by Beat guitarist Dave Wakeling as a teenager before the founding of the band. The song was then attempted at band rehearsals. Although Wakeling said he "always liked the song before [he] was in the group," it was initially rejected by bassist David Steele for "being too 'rock,' too 'old wave'". The ska-influenced original has "hints of rock and old wave...the lyrics are said to be about coming of age, according to writer Dave Wakeling, but the title is also a reference to a dirty joke popular with schoolboys." The dirty joke, Wakeling explained in 2012, is a play on words: "The phrase 'save it for later' is meant to be 'save it,' comma, 'fellator.' As in, 'Leave it as it is, cocksucker.' But we didn't have the term 'cocksucker' in England at the time. We didn't really learn that one 'til we came to America. So it wasn't really a put-down, because we didn't really use that term to put down people at the time, and I don't think they do very much in England now, either. Anyways, that was the nature of the joke."

By the time of the band's third studio album, however, Steele had been unable to provide enough material and the record company began pressuring the band to record "Save It for Later". Wakeling recalled, "It was only really when the record company insisted [on releasing the track], and I got a bit of courage and said, 'Well, look, if it’s not on our record I’d just rather go and record it myself and bring it out.'" Steele continued to refuse to play on the backing track, leaving Wakeling and drummer Everett Morton to record a basic track until the rest of the band relented.

== Music and lyrics ==
"Save It for Later" features a unique DADAAD tuning that Wakeling stumbled upon; he explained, "I had tried to tune my guitar to DADGAD to play along with Jon Martyn [sic] tunes in late 70's before the English Beat started. I accidentally came up with DADAAD, so I made up my own chord shapes and enjoyed the hypnotic drone of the tuning on my national steel for hour after hour."

Guitarist Pete Townshend called Wakeling to ask how to play the song, having been confused while trying to teach himself the guitar part:

"I got a phone call at 11 in the morning, and somebody gave me the phone and said, “It’s Pete Townshend for you.” And I said, “Of course it is, he phones about this time every Saturday doesn’t he?” [Laughs.] I thought it was somebody making a joke. I picked up very sarcastically, 'Oh, hello Pete.' And he said, 'Oh, hello Dave, this is Peter Townshend here and I’m sitting with David Gilmour [of Pink Floyd], and we're trying to work out your song 'Save It for Later,' but we can’t work out the tuning.' They presumed it was DADGAD as well, and couldn’t make it work, and so I had to explain that I’d made a mistake and it was not DADGAD, it was DADAAD. And he laughed and said, 'Oh, thank heavens for that! We've been breaking our fingers trying to get our hands around these chords.'"

— Dave Wakeling

Townshend subsequently performed the song at his Deep End concerts.

Wakeling described the lyrical theme of "Save It for Later" as "about turning from a teenager to someone in their 20s." The title of the song also served as a double entendre—Wakeling explained, "It started off as a dirty schoolboy joke. The phrase 'save it for later' is meant to be 'save it,' comma, 'fellator.'"

== Release and critical reception ==
"Save It for Later" was released on Special Beat Service in 1982. The song was also released as a single, reaching number 47 on the UK Singles Chart. In the US, along with the track, "Sole Salvation", "Save It for Later" went to number 58 on the Billboard Dance/Disco Top 80 chart.

"Save It for Later" remains one of the Beat's most acclaimed songs. Wakeling acknowledged the song's success, saying, "[The track] actually ended up earning about a third of our catalogue's publishing money, nowadays." According to Wakeling, Pete Townshend (who covered the song on multiple occasions) described the song as "one of [his] favorite songs in [his] whole life." Townshend included the song as one of several covers on his 1986 live album Deep End Live!. Counting Crows' lead vocalist Adam Duritz named it his perfect summer song, saying, "There's just something about the joy of the song ... It just seems so Technicolor to me." Pearl Jam regularly performs the song live in a medley with their song "Better Man."

The track has appeared in Kingpin (1996), Since You've Been Gone (1998), Big Daddy (1999), Funny People (2009), Hot Tub Time Machine (2010), Spider-Man: Homecoming (2017), and Like Father (2018). It also features in the Season 1 finale of Love and Once Upon a Time in the episode "Wake Up Call".

== Cover versions ==
A cover of the song by Seattle alternative rock band Harvey Danger appears in the film 200 Cigarettes (1999); a version by Canadian punk rock band Flashlight Brown appears in Sky High (2005). A cover of the song by Pearl Jam's Eddie Vedder was recorded specifically for use in the American television series The Bear. As described by American Songwriter, the Vedder version recorded for The Bear has "more of a quiet, anticipatory lead-up...[not] quite as brash as the original. The English Beat version definitely has more of a brit-rock flavor, while Vedder's version is firmly rooted in U.S. grunge." In 2025, Vedder released a cover of the song as a limited edition 12" single (backed with his version of Tom Petty and the Heartbreakers' "Room at the Top") for Record Store Day.
