= Can't Get Used to Losing You =

1963 song by Andy Williams

- One of US single picture sleeves

Single by Andy Williams with Robert Mersey and his Orchestra

from the album Days of Wine and Roses and Other TV Requests
- B-side: "Days of Wine and Roses"
- Released: March 1963
- Recorded: December 1962
- Genre: Easy listening
- Length: 2:20
- Label: Columbia 42674
- Songwriters: Jerome "Doc" Pomus, Mort Shuman
- Producer: Robert Mersey

Andy Williams with Robert Mersey and his Orchestra singles chronology
"Don't You Believe It" (1962)	"Can't Get Used to Losing You" (1963)	"Days of Wine and Roses" (1963)

"Can't Get Used to Losing You" is a song written by Jerome "Doc" Pomus and Mort Shuman, first made popular by Andy Williams in a 1963 record release, which was a number-two hit in both the US and the UK. Twenty years later, British band The Beat took a reggae re-arrangement to number three in the UK.

== Andy Williams recording ==
"Can't Get Used to Losing You" was recorded by Andy Williams in December 1962 and released in 1963. It peaked at number two in both the US and the UK. In the US, the single spent four weeks at number two on the Billboard Hot 100 chart (behind "He's So Fine" by the Chiffons and "I Will Follow Him" by Little Peggy March) and topped the Easy Listening chart for four weeks, peaking on both in April 1963. Williams' recording peaked at number one on the Cashbox charts.

Williams' vocals on the song's verses were double-tracked in unison, and overdubbed on the choruses so the listener hears Williams singing harmony with himself. The song appears on an album titled Days of Wine and Roses and Other TV Requests in North America and Can't Get Used to Losing You and Other Requests in the United Kingdom.

=== Charts ===
Chart (1963)	Peak position
Germany (GfK)	39
UK Singles (Official Charts)	2
US Billboard Hot 100	2
US Cash Box Top 100	1
US Adult Contemporary	1
US Hot R&B	7

== Other 1960s covers ==
In 1963, Patti Page recorded a version, with strings background, as part of the Say Wonderful Things album. In the same year, Paul Anka included it on the album Song I Wish I'd Written, and Julie London performed it on The Wonderful World of Julie London. In 1965, Chad and Jeremy's cover appeared on their Before and After. Welsh band Amen Corner covered the song on their debut album Round Amen Corner.

== The Beat version ==
"Can't Get Used to Losing You"

Song by The Beat

from the album I Just Can't Stop It
- Released: May 1980
- Genre: Two-tone; pop; ska
- Length: 3:04
- Label: Go-Feet; Sire
- Songwriters: Doc Pomus; Mort Shuman
- Producer: Bob Sargeant

Official audio
- "Can't Get Used to Losing You" (2012 Remaster) on YouTube

"Can't Get Used to Losing You (1983 Remix Version)"

Single by The Beat

from the album What Is Beat?
- B-side: "Spar Wid Me"
- Released: 15 April 1983
- Genre: Two-tone; pop; ska
- Length: 3:23
- Label: Go-Feet; Arista
- Songwriters: Doc Pomus; Mort Shuman
- Producer: Bob Sargeant

The Beat singles chronology
"I Confess" (1982)	"Can't Get Used to Losing You (1983 Remix Version)" (1983)	"Ackee 1-2-3" (1983)

The Beat (known as The English Beat in the USA) originally recorded their cover of "Can't Get Used to Losing You" as a track on their 1980 album I Just Can't Stop It. It was not released as a single until three years later, just as the Beat announced that they were breaking up. The single was remixed slightly from the album track, and became the band's fifth and final top ten UK hit, and their highest-charting single release.

Elvis Costello, who singled out the song as his favorite Doc Pomus composition, had hoped to cover the song, but scrapped the idea after "the Beat beat me to it".

=== Personnel ===
Credits are adapted from the album's liner notes.

- Dave Wakeling – lead vocals; rhythm guitar
- Ranking Roger – toasting; vocals
- Andy Cox – lead guitar
- David Steele – bass guitar
- Everett Morton – drums
- Saxa – saxophone

=== Charts ===
Chart (1983)	Peak position
Belgium (Ultratop 50 Flanders)	9
Ireland (IRMA)	2
Netherlands (Dutch Top 40)	9
Netherlands (Single Top 100)	12
New Zealand (Recorded Music NZ)	47
UK Singles (Official Charts)	3

== Other versions ==
British singer Colour Girl had a number 31 hit with her UK garage version in 2000.

== See also ==
- List of number-one adult contemporary singles of 1963 (U.S.)
