= The Tears of a Clown =

1970 single by Smokey Robinson & the Miracles

- Spanish picture sleeve

Single by Smokey Robinson & the Miracles

from the album Make It Happen (aka The Tears of a Clown)
- B-side: "Promise Me"
- Released: July 1970
- Recorded: 1967
- Studio: Hitsville U.S.A. (Studio A), Detroit
- Genre: Soul; pop
- Length: 3:02
- Label: Tamla; T 54199
- Songwriters: Hank Cosby; Smokey Robinson; Stevie Wonder
- Producers: Hank Cosby and Smokey Robinson

Smokey Robinson & the Miracles singles chronology
| "Who's Gonna Take the Blame" (1970) | "The Tears of a Clown" (1970) | "I Don't Blame You at All" (1971) |

Music video
- Smokey Robinson & The Miracles - "The Tears Of A Clown" on YouTube

"The Tears of a Clown" is a song written by Hank Cosby, Smokey Robinson, and Stevie Wonder and originally recorded by Smokey Robinson & the Miracles for the Tamla Records label subsidiary of Motown, first appearing on the 1967 album Make It Happen. The track was re-released in the United Kingdom as a single in July 1970, and it became a number-one hit on the UK singles chart for the week ending September 12, 1970. Subsequently, Motown released a partially re-recorded and completely remixed version as a single in the United States as well, where it quickly became a number-one hit on both the Billboard Hot 100 and R&B Singles charts.

This song is an international multi-million seller and a 2002 Grammy Hall of Fame inductee. Its success led Miracles lead singer, songwriter, and producer Smokey Robinson, who had announced plans to leave the act, to stay until 1972. In 2021, it was listed at No. 313 on Rolling Stone's "Top 500 Greatest Songs of All Time".

== History ==
=== Origins ===
Stevie Wonder (who was discovered by Miracles member Ronnie White) and his producer Hank Cosby wrote the music for the song, and Cosby produced the instrumental track recording. Wonder brought the instrumental track to the 1966 Motown Christmas party because he could not come up with a lyric to fit the instrumental. Wonder wanted to see what Robinson could come up with for the track. Robinson, who remarked that the song's distinctive calliope motif "sounded like a circus," provided lyrics that reflected his vision and sang lead vocal. In the song, his character, sad because a woman has left him, compares himself to the characters in the opera Pagliacci, comedians/clowns who hide their hurt and anger behind empty smiles. He had used this comparison before: the line "just like Pagliacci did/I'll try to keep my sadness hid" appears in this song as well as in "My Smile Is Just a Frown (Turned Upside Down)", which he had written in 1964 for Motown artist Carolyn Crawford. The record is one of the few hit pop singles to feature the bassoon, which was played by Charles R. Sirard.

"The Tears of a Clown" was an album track on 1967's Make It Happen but was not released as a single. "The Tears of a Clown" on the monaural version of Make It Happen contains an alternate lead vocal with a slightly different verse melody. By 1969, Robinson had become tired of constantly touring with the Miracles, and wanted to remain home in Detroit, Michigan, with his wife Claudette and their two children, Berry and Tamla (both named after aspects of the Motown corporation). Robinson informed his groupmates Pete Moore, Bobby Rogers, and best friend Ronald White that he would be retiring from the act to concentrate on his duties as vice-president of Motown Records.

=== Commercial success ===
In 1970, to capitalize on the Miracles' success, and due to a lack of new material from the group, Motown Britain selected "The Tears of a Clown" from the group's catalog for single release. One account suggests it was Karen Spreadbury, head of the British division of the Motown Fan Club, who first recommended the track to John Reid, then UK manager for the American Tamla Motown label, who went on to manage Elton John and Queen, when he asked her which track she'd favor as a single from the 1967 album. Reid reportedly then gave the go ahead for “Tears of a Clown” to be issued as the single. The record became a #1 hit in the UK seven weeks after its July release.

This newfound popularity prompted Motown to release the song as a single in the United States, using a new mix of the song made in February 1970 (whereas the UK release had used the original 1967 stereo mix from the Make It Happen LP). Cash Box said of the US single release that it was a "brilliant return to the heyday sound of the Miracles," calling it "bright blues rock that hasn't been heard here for a long while." It became a #1 hit on both the pop and R&B charts within two months of its release. Despite the fact that the Miracles had been one of Motown's premier acts in the early and mid-1960s and its first successful group act, "The Tears of a Clown" was their first and only #1 hit while Smokey Robinson was lead singer. (The Miracles hit #1 again several years later with the smash hit "Love Machine", but by that time Smokey had long since left the group, replaced by Billy Griffin. "Shop Around" had hit #1 on the Cash Box Pop Chart, but only #2 on Billboard's.)

The 45 single was issued with two different B-sides: the first pressing had an alternate version of the 1967 Miracles Top 20 hit single "The Love I Saw in You Was Just a Mirage;" the second had a new Miracles song, "Promise Me". Motown released a Tears of a Clown LP in 1970 as well, which was essentially a re-packaging of the Miracles' 1967 Make It Happen. It was included again on the group's 1971 LP One Dozen Roses, which used a new stereo mix.

Two years later, Smokey Robinson decided to follow through with his plans to leave the Miracles and retire. Smokey Robinson & the Miracles embarked on a six-month farewell tour, culminating in a July 16, 1972, performance in Washington, DC, where Robinson introduced the Miracles' new lead singer, Billy Griffin.

The song charted again in the UK in 1976, peaking at number 34 (see The Miracles discography).

== Personnel ==
The Miracles

- Smokey Robinson – lead vocals
- Claudette Rogers Robinson – background vocals
- Pete Moore – background vocals
- Ronnie White – background vocals
- Bobby Rogers – background vocals
- Marv Tarplin – guitar

Other personnel

- Written by Stevie Wonder, Hank Cosby, and William "Smokey" Robinson
- Produced by Hank Cosby and William "Smokey" Robinson
- Charles R. Sirard – bassoon
- Mike Terry – baritone saxophone
- Melvin Davis – drums
- Other instrumentation by the Funk Brothers
  - There is some uncertainty about who from the Motown session musicians the Funk Brothers played bass on the recording. Variously Tony Newton, Bob Babbitt, and James Jamerson have been noted as playing on takes of the song. It is speculated that Jamerson performed on the original track. When Motown prepared the song for a US single release in 1970, they dubbed in new drums and bass. Babbitt is credited as playing bass on the 1970 dub.

== Charts ==
=== Weekly charts ===
1970–1971 weekly chart performance for "The Tears of a Clown"
| Chart (1970–1971) | Peak position |
|---|---|
| Australia (Kent Music Report) | 7 |
| Belgium (Ultratop 50 Flanders) | 7 |
| Canada RPM Top Singles | 7 |
| Ireland (IRMA) | 3 |
| Netherlands (Single Top 100) | 4 |
| UK (OCC) | 1 |
| US Billboard Hot 100 | 1 |
| US Billboard R&B | 1 |
| US Cash Box Top 100 | 1 |

1976 weekly chart performance for "The Tears of a Clown"
| Chart (1976) | Peak position |
|---|---|
| UK (OCC) | 34 |

=== Year-end charts ===
Year-end chart performance for "The Tears of a Clown"
| Chart (1970) | Rank |
|---|---|
| Netherlands | 54 |
| UK (OCC) | 10 |

== Certifications ==
Certifications for "The Tears of a Clown"
| Region | Certification | Certified units/sales |
|---|---|---|
| United Kingdom (BPI) | Silver | 200,000^{‡} |
^{‡} Sales+streaming figures based on certification alone.

== The Beat version ==
"Tears of a Clown"
- Original 2 Tone cover

Single by the Beat
- A-side: "Ranking Full Stop" (double A-side)
- Released: November 30, 1979
- Genre: Two-tone; pop; ska; R&B; soul
- Length: 2:39
- Label: 2 Tone (UK); Chrysalis (Europe)
- Songwriters: Hank Cosby; Smokey Robinson; Stevie Wonder
- Producer: Bob Sargeant

The Beat singles chronology
| "Tears of a Clown" (1979) | "Hands Off...She's Mine" (1980) |

Official audio
- "The Tears of a Clown" on YouTube

In November 1979, the British ska/new wave band the Beat released a cover of the song as their debut single on the 2 Tone label. The double A-side with "Ranking Full Stop" reached number 6 on the UK Singles Chart, making it the band's third biggest hit. It was also certified silver in the UK by the BPI.

It was not included on the original UK release of the Beat's debut album, I Just Can't Stop It, but was included on the US release and has been included on subsequent CD reissues of the album.

=== Personnel ===
Credits are adapted from the liner notes for I Just Can't Stop It.

- Dave Wakeling – lead vocals, rhythm guitar
- Ranking Roger – toasting, vocals
- Andy Cox – lead guitar
- David Steele – bass guitar
- Everett Morton – drums
- Saxa – saxophone

=== Charts ===
| Chart (1980) | Peak position |
|---|---|
| Belgium (Ultratop 50 Flanders) | 23 |
| Ireland (IRMA) | 16 |
| UK Singles (Official Charts) | 6 |

== See also ==
- List of Hot 100 number-one singles of 1970 (U.S.)
- "Vesti la giubba"
