= The Beat (British band) =

English band

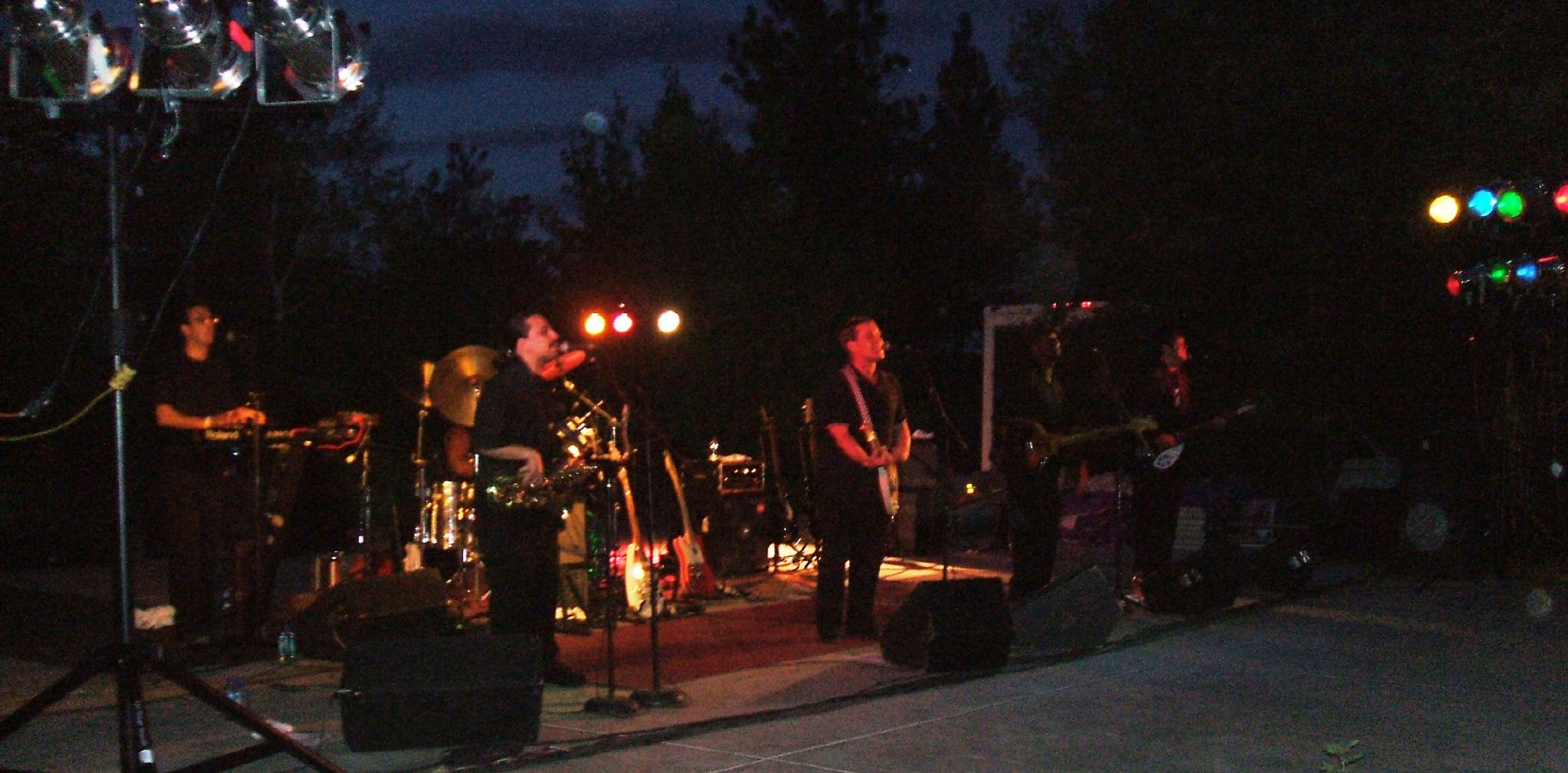
- The Beat in 2007

Background information
- Also known as: The English Beat, the British Beat
- Origin: Birmingham, England
- Genres: Ska; two-tone; reggae rock; post-punk
- Works: The Beat discography
- Years active: 1978–1983; 2003; 2006–present
- Labels: Go-Feet; 2 Tone; London; Sire; I.R.S.; EMI; A&M; Chrysalis
- Spinoffs: General Public; Fine Young Cannibals
- Members: Dave Wakeling; Antonee First Class
- Past members: Ranking Roger; Andy Cox; David Steele; Everett Morton; Saxa; Wesley Magoogan; Dave 'Blockhead' Wright

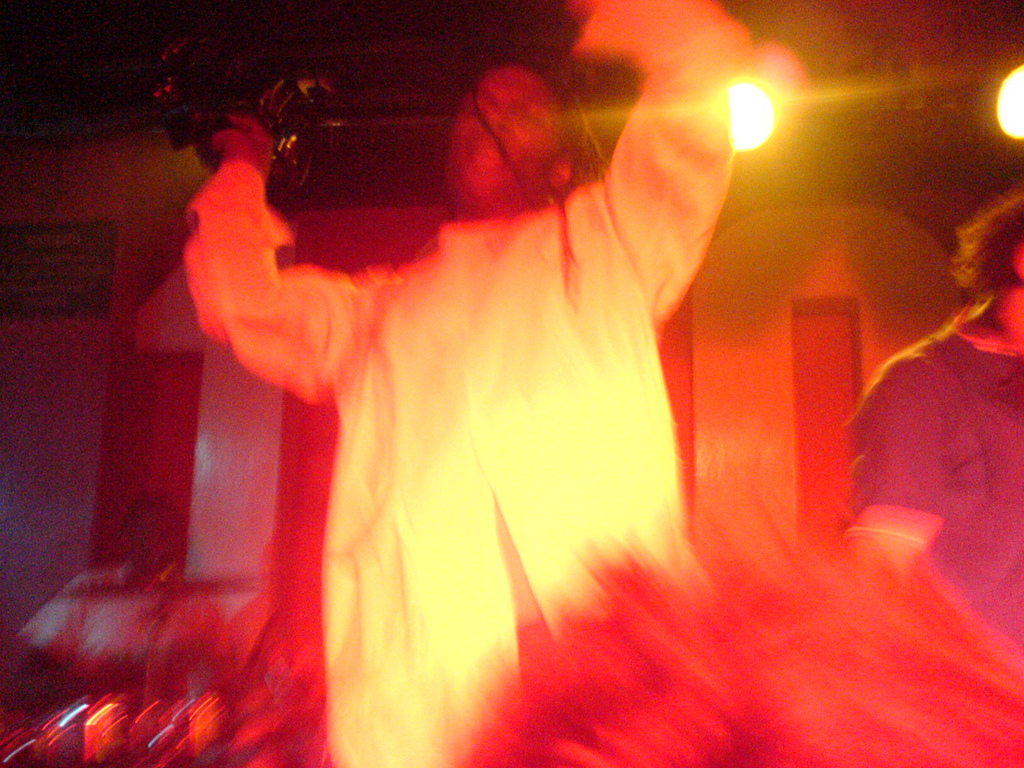
Ranking Roger and Everett Morton's reformation of the Beat in London, 2006

The Beat (known in the United States and Canada as the English Beat and in Australia as the British Beat) are an English band formed in Birmingham in 1978. Their music fuses Latin, ska, pop, soul, reggae and punk rock.

The Beat, consisting of Dave Wakeling (vocals, guitar), Ranking Roger (vocals), Andy Cox (guitar), David Steele (bass), Everett Morton (drums) and Saxa a.k.a. Lionel Augustus Martin (saxophone), joined by keyboard player Dave "Blockhead" Wright in 1980, released three studio albums in the early 1980s: I Just Can't Stop It (1980), Wha'ppen? (1981) and Special Beat Service (1982), and a string of singles, including "Mirror in the Bathroom", "Save It for Later", "I Confess", "Too Nice to Talk To", "Can't Get Used to Losing You", "Hands Off...She's Mine" and "All Out to Get You".

== Career ==
=== 1978–1983 ===
The Beat formed in Birmingham, England, in 1978, during a period of high unemployment and social upheaval in the United Kingdom. Ranking Roger, one of the band's vocalists, added a Jamaican vocal flavour to the band's sound with his toasting style. Jamaican saxophonist Saxa added a Jamaican ska instrumental sound. Saxa (born Lionel Augustus Martin in 1930) had played saxophone with Prince Buster, Laurel Aitken, and Desmond Dekker in the first wave of ska. He joined the Beat to record their first single, "Tears of a Clown", a cover version of the Motown hit by Smokey Robinson and the Miracles.

The band's debut studio album, I Just Can't Stop It, was released in May 1980, entering the UK albums chart at No. 3. Notable singles from the album included "Can't Get Used to Losing You", "Mirror in the Bathroom", "Hands Off...She's Mine" and "Best Friend". The second Beat album, Wha'ppen? was supported by extensive touring, including a United States tour with the Pretenders and Talking Heads. The album yielded more UK hits, with "All Out to Get You", "Drowning" and "Doors of Your Heart", all of which broke into the Top 40 of the UK Singles Chart. The Beat received support from modern rock radio stations such as KROQ-FM in Los Angeles, the now defunct KQAK The Quake 99FM (98.9) & KITS Live 105 (105.3) in San Francisco and KYYX in Seattle.

Although the Beat's main fan base was in the UK, the band was also popular in Australia, partly due to exposure on the radio station Triple J and the TV show Countdown. The Beat had a sizable following in the US and Canada, where the band were known as the English Beat for legal reasons (to avoid confusion with the American band the Beat). The Beat toured the world with well-known artists including David Bowie, the Clash, the Police, the Pretenders, R.E.M., the Specials and Talking Heads. Members of the band often collaborated on stage with the Specials.

During their early career, the band were associated with Birmingham-based cartoonist Hunt Emerson, who designed their 'Beat Girl' icon and painted the mural that was used on the cover of Wha'ppen?

Band Name

The band were known by different names in different markets. In the United Kingdom and Europe, they were known as The Beat, while in the United States and Canada they were known as The English Beat, and The British Beat in Australia. The alternative names were adopted to distinguish the band from the American power-pop group The Beat, led by Paul Collins, which was active at the same time.

=== Post-breakup ===
After the break-up of the Beat in 1983, Dave Wakeling and Ranking Roger went on to form General Public and had a couple of hit singles in the US and Canada including "Tenderness", while Andy Cox and David Steele formed Fine Young Cannibals with vocalist Roland Gift from the ska band Akrylykz. Drummer Everett Morton and Saxa formed the International Beat along with the Birmingham-based singer, Tony Beet, and the band released an album titled The Hitting Line on Blue Beat Records in 1990. The album was produced by Ranking Roger and he often guested with the band at some of their shows. The International Beat toured the UK and United States until 1992.

Ranking Roger also briefly joined Mick Jones' post-Clash band Big Audio Dynamite and performed at several live shows with the band. However, the band broke up shortly after he joined when its last album was shelved by the record company. Meanwhile, "March of the Swivelheads", an instrumental version of the Beat's song "Rotating Head", was used in the climactic chase scene of 1986's Ferris Bueller's Day Off; the band was listed in the end credits as "The (English) Beat". "Save It for Later" was featured on the soundtrack album to 1996's Kingpin, 2010's Hot Tub Time Machine and 2017's Spider-Man: Homecoming.

Everett Morton formed Beat Goes Bang and recruited vocalist Ross Lydon from 360, bass player Faisal Rashid, and Lukasz Machometa on sax, former member of Citybeats and Urban Groove Syndicate.

Roger released his solo debut, a reggae-oriented album entitled Radical Departure, in 1988. In the early 1990s, Roger joined members of the Specials to form Special Beat, which toured and released two live albums. They supported the Campaign for Nuclear Disarmament (CND). In 2001, Roger released another solo album, Inside My Head, which included traditional reggae and ska with influences of electronica, jungle and dub. Ranking Roger's son, Ranking Junior, followed in his father's footsteps. In 2005, he appeared on the Ordinary Boys' single "Boys Will Be Boys".

Pete Townshend performed "Save It for Later" numerous times between 1985 and 1998. The Who performed the song twice on their 1989 Reunion Tour.

Brazilian rock group Paralamas do Sucesso, strongly influenced by ska and world music, inspired by the vibraphone chords from "Hand's Off... She's Mine" to make the intro chords of their song "Oculos", recorded in 1984.

The Wonder Stuff also played "Save It for Later" featuring Ranking Roger on their "From the Midlands with Love" series in June 2012.

Pearl Jam also began playing "Save It for Later" in 1996, blending it (a practice often known as "tagging") into the end of "Better Man", and it remained in the set list of their 2023 tour. In June 2024, lead singer Eddie Vedder released a full, solo version of the track.

=== 21st century ===
In 2003, the Beat's original line-up, minus Cox and Steele, played a sold-out one-off gig at the Royal Festival Hall. In 2004, the VH1 show Bands Reunited tried unsuccessfully to reunite the original line-up.

In 2006, the UK version of the Beat, featuring Ranking Roger, recorded a new album that was mixed by Adrian Sherwood, but it remains unreleased. The band also featured Everett Morton and Mickey Billingham on keyboards, formerly a member of Dexys Midnight Runners and General Public.

Dave Wakeling fronts the US version of the group as the English Beat, which usually adds a couple of General Public songs to the setlist. The singer and his band flew to the UK in April 2011, to perform at the London International Ska Festival at the Clapham Grand music venue. They played the Great Dorset Steam Fair show 2011 on 31 August 2011. At this point, both the UK and US versions of the band continued to tour frequently on either sides of the Atlantic.

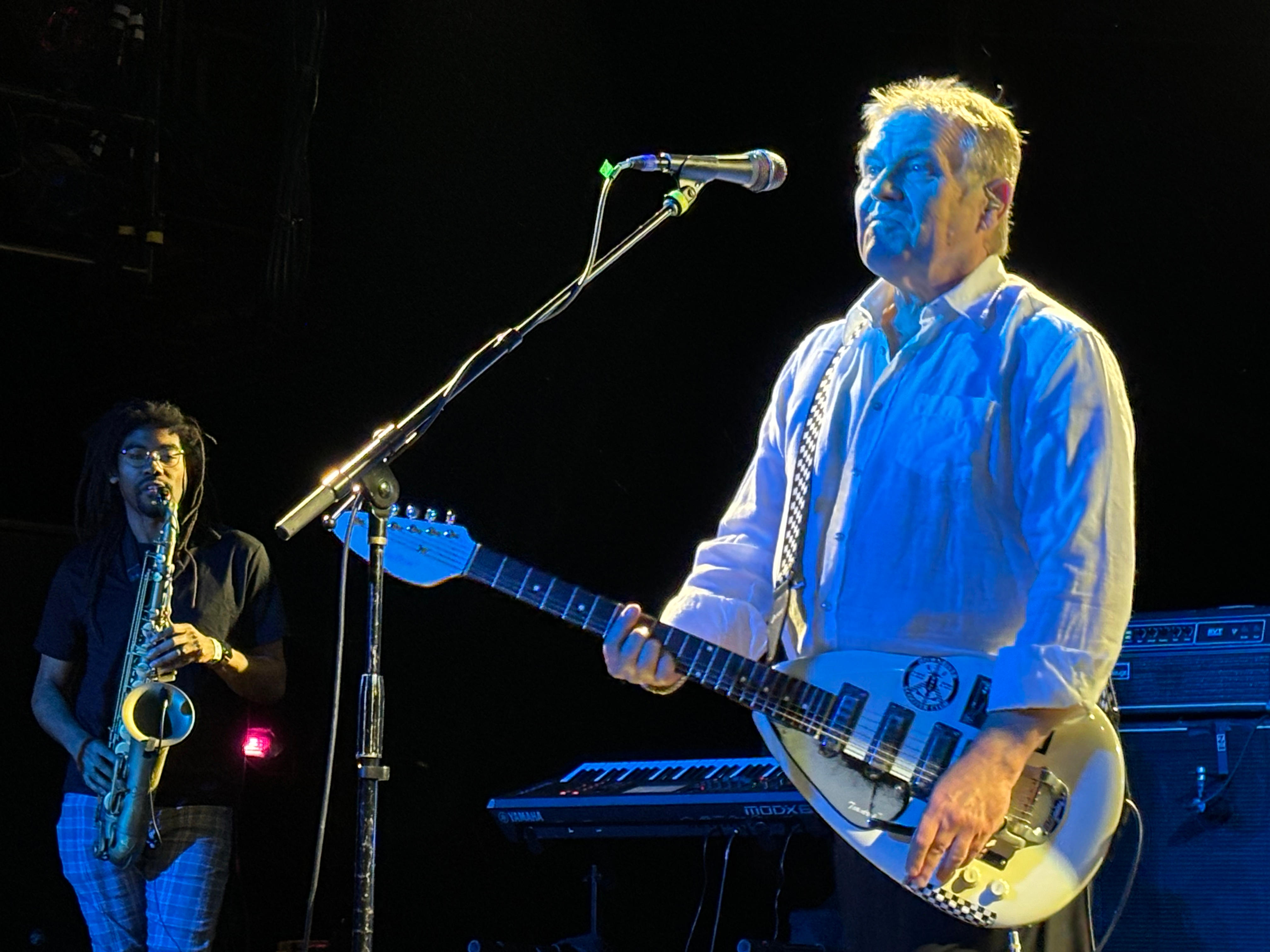
David Wakeling performs with The English Beat at The Palladium in New York City on April 7, 2024.

In mid-2012, the Beat released a box set, titled The Complete Beat, comprising their three albums along with non-album singles, remixes and live material. Additional bonus tracks were included on re-released, double-CD versions of each studio album.

The English Beat recorded two new songs that feature prominently in the Scooby-Doo! Mystery Incorporated episode "Dance of the Undead" which aired 26 March 2013. It features a zombie ska group called Rude Boy and the Ska-Tastics who come back to life in order to turn people into zombies and make them dance to ska music forever. According to an interview Dave Wakeling conducted with the San Francisco Examiner, he said: "This was my first opportunity to do anything for television as a gun for hire, and I actually managed to record and mix two songs in 12 hours. It was like running at double speed with no brakes, but it was exciting, and Warner Bros. really loved them. So the zombies have a song called 'You’re Dead Right, Mate,' and the Hex Girls have one called 'We're the Good Bad Girls,’ which has a definite Ramones–Runaways vibe to it, but frankly, I'm really happy I did it, because I’ve always loved ‘Scooby-Doo."

In late 2013, the Beat with Ranking Roger released the live album, Live in London which featured a new song titled "How Do You Do (Side to Side)" and also a song previously released solo by Ranking Roger, entitled "Dangerous", among many other songs.

The Beat feat. Ranking Roger released Bounce, a studio album, on 30 September 2016, on CD, Vinyl and Digital on DMF Records. The first single from the album, 'Walking on the Wrong Side' was released in July 2016, whilst the album reached No. 49 on the UK Albums Chart.

Saxa (born Lionel Augustus Martin) died on 3 May 2017 at the age of 87.

In 2018 the Beat feat. Ranking Roger released The Beat – Live at the Roundhouse a live album with accompanying DVD, while the (English) Beat starring Dave Wakeling released an album called Here We Go Love. This album was announced by Wakeling in 2014, with the project funded through the PledgeMusic website (which was a direct-to-fan music platform where fans could donate money to a group to complete an album project).

On 26 January 2019 the Beat feat. Ranking Roger released a new studio album, Public Confidential. The first single from the album 'Maniac' was playlisted on BBC Radio 6 Music.

Weeks after undergoing surgery for two brain tumours, and while undergoing treatment for lung cancer, Ranking Roger died at home on 26 March 2019, aged 56.

In March 2021, Mini Murphy (Ranking Junior from the Special Beat and the version of the Beat signed to DMF Music in 2016) teamed up with indie rock band the Ordinary Boys to record a tribute to his late father, Ranking Roger. The resulting double-A side single, with "Legacy" on one side and "Jump and Skank" on the other, was released as a download, vinyl and CD single by United Sound Records/Proper.

On 8 October 2021, drummer Everett Morton died in Birmingham at the age of 71. Keyboardist Dave "Blockhead" Wright died in October 2025.

== Personnel ==
=== The Beat / The English Beat ===
- Andy Cox – guitar (1978–1983)
- Everett Morton – drums (1978–1983, died 2021)
- Ranking Roger – lead vocals, toasting (1978–1983, died 2019)
- Saxa – saxophone (1978–1983, died 2017)
- David Steele – bass (1978–1983)
- Dave Wakeling – lead vocals, guitar (1978–1983)
- Dave "Blockhead" Wright – keyboards (1980–1983; died 2025)
- Wesley Magoogan – saxophone (1981–1983)

=== The English Beat starring Dave Wakeling ===
- Dave Wakeling – lead vocals, guitar
- Brian Nucci Cantrell – drums, vocals
- Matt Morrish – sax, vocals
- Wesley Perry – sax, vocals (current)
- Kevin Lum – keys, vocals
- Minh Quan – keys, vocals
- Brad Engstrom – bass, vocals
- Antonee First Class – toasting (current)

== Discography ==
=== The Beat / The English Beat's original run ===
- I Just Can't Stop It (1980)
- Wha'ppen? (1981)
- Special Beat Service (1982)

=== The Beat featuring Ranking Roger ===
- Bounce (2016)
- Public Confidential (2019)

=== The Beat starring Dave Wakeling ===
- Here We Go Love (2018)

== Bibliography ==
- The Rolling Stone Encyclopedia of Rock and Roll, Third Edition (Fireside, 2001)
- The Beat: Twist and Crawl by Malu Halasa (Eel Pie, 1981)
- Simmons, Doug (7 December 1982). "No touching, please, we're British: On the road with the English Beat". The Boston Phoenix.
