= Everett Morton =

Saint Kitts-born British ska drummer (1950–2021)

- Born: Everett Livingstone Matthew Morton; 5 April 1950; Saint Kitts and Nevis
- Died: 8 October 2021 (aged 71) Birmingham, England
- Genres: New wave; ska; post-punk; Dub
- Occupations: Drummer; musician
- Instruments: Drums; percussion
- Years active: 1978–2019
- Labels: 2 Tone Records; Go-Feet Records
- Formerly of: The Beat; The International Beat

Everett Livingstone Matthew Morton (5 April 1950 – 8 October 2021) was a Saints Kitts-born British ska drummer best known for his work with the band the Beat. Following the breakup of the band in 1983, Morton joined former Beat bandmate Saxa, guitarist/vocalist Tony Beet, General Public keyboardist Mickey Billingham, and others to form the International Beat; sometimes featuring Beat frontman Ranking Roger as a guest vocalist.

Pete Chambers, curator of the Coventry Music Museum described Morton as the 'engine room of the Ska band': “He was a true gentleman, gently spoken, charming, always supportive and always there for people...His drumming was incredible gracing top ten charts hits such as ‘Tears of A Clown’, ‘Mirror in The Bathroom’ and ‘Can’t Get used to losing You’ and top ten albums: ‘I Just Can’t Stop It’ and ‘Wha’ppen’.”

== Career ==
After moving to Birmingham in the 1960s, Morton went to drum school and joined his cousin's band. 15 years of drumming in reggae and soul bands honed Morton into a deeply coveted percussionist in the Birmingham music scene. On recommendation from Steele's psychiatric hospital colleague, Morton joined Dave Wakeling, Ranking Roger, and Andy Cox to form The Beat in 1978.

Morton is described as having a frantic style, weaving a tapestry of intricate new rhythms by playing the entirety of his drum kit. Morton's distinctive style was additionally flavoured by his approach to his drum kit, playing a right-handed drum kit setup it left-handed. Wakeling noted the skill with which Morton held his bandmates: “He’s such a strong player and he was so much better than the rest of us when we began that if he thought we were going wrong he’d just stop us dead with a roll – we’d stand there open-mouthed until he let us back in.”. Over their first five years, the Beat toured internationally with The Clash, The Police, R.E.M., and David Bowie.

Following the breakup of the band in 1983, Morton joined fellow Beat saxophonist Saxa, guitarist/vocalist Tony Beet, General Public keyboardist Mickey Billingham, and others to form the International Beat; sometimes featuring Beat frontman Ranking Roger as a guest vocalist who also produced their album The Hitting Line in 1990.

== Personal life and death ==
Born in St Kitts on 5 April 1950, Morton moved to Birmingham in the 1960s.

In the 2010s, Morton broke his knee, preventing him from playing for several years as it healed.

Morton died in Birmingham on 8 October 2021, at the age of 71.
