= Bob Sargeant =

British musician and record producer (1947–2021)

- Born: Robert Sargeant; 20 November 1947; North Shields, Northumberland, England
- Died: 13 July 2021 (aged 73) Kilburn, London, England
- Occupations: Musician; record producer
- Instruments: Keyboards; guitar
- Years active: c. 1965–c. 1990
- Label: RCA

Robert Sargeant (20 November 1947 – 13 July 2021) was a British musician and record producer.

== Life and career ==
Born in North Shields, Sargeant played keyboards in various local bands before joining regional R&B band the Junco Partners in 1966. He left in 1970 to become a studio musician in London, and in the early 1970s played live with Mick Abrahams, Al Stewart, and the band Curved Air, appearing on the band's album Airborne (1976).

In the summer of 1974, Sargeant began working on a solo album, First Starring Role, and met Mick Ronson who "was immediately impressed with Bob as both a songwriter and a performer". The soft rock album was recorded at Trident Studios, with Ronson co-producing it with Sargeant and Dennis Mackay. It features a number of well-known musicians such as Herbie Flowers, Walt Monaghan, Mike Garson and Cozy Powell. All the songs were written, arranged and sung by Sargeant, who also played electric guitars, keyboards and various percussion. It was released on 16 May 1975 on RCA Records and three singles were also released, but it found little success.

He became a regular producer of sessions on John Peel's radio shows on BBC Radio 1 in the late 1970s and 1980s, especially on post-punk and new wave acts, including Joy Division, the Cure, Stiff Little Fingers, Gang of Four, Wire, and Dexys Midnight Runners. He also produced several successful records for bands including the Fall (Live at the Witch Trials), the Ruts, the Monochrome Set, and the Beat. For the Beat, he produced three successful albums and several hit singles including "Tears of a Clown", "Mirror in the Bathroom", and "Can't Get Used to Losing You".

Later in the 1980s, Sargeant worked successfully as a producer for Haircut 100, A Flock of Seagulls, the Specials, the Undertones, the Damned, the Woodentops, and many more. His final successes came in the late 1980s with the band Breathe, for whom he produced the hit singles "Hands to Heaven" and "How Can I Fall?". Sargeant also made a habit of playing on the records he produced, particularly the marimba in the 1980s. A notable example of this is on "Love Plus One" by Haircut One Hundred.

His activities after the early 1990s were less prominent. He died in Kilburn, London, in 2021, at the age of 73.

== Selected production credits ==
- 24 Hours – The Transmitters (1978)
- Live at the Witch Trials – The Fall (1979)
- The Crack – The Ruts (1979)
- Frustration Paradise – The Carpettes (1979)
- Jellied Eels to Record Deals – The Buzzards (1979) (only "Baby If You Love Me Say Yes If You Don't Say No")
- Strange Boutique – The Monochrome Set (1980)
- I Just Can't Stop It – The Beat (1980)
- Q-Tips – Q-Tips (1980)
- Wha'ppen? – The Beat (1981)
- Pelican West – Haircut One Hundred (1982)
- Special Beat Service – The Beat (1982)
- Mummer – XTC (1983) (only "Great Fire")
- Paint and Paint – Haircut One Hundred (1984)
- No Sense of Sin – The Lotus Eaters (1984)
- Trapped and Unwrapped – Friends Again (1984)
- Theodore and Friends – The Adventures (1985) (only "Send My Heart")
- Phantasmagoria – The Damned (1985) (only "Grimly Fiendish")
- Face Another Day – The Monroes (1985)
- Giant – The Woodentops (1986)
- All That Jazz – Breathe (1987)
- Ultra Modern Nursery Rhymes – Terry, Blair & Anouchka (1990)
- Witness – Halo James (1990)
- Peace of Mind – Breathe (1990)
- Your Beauty – Grethe Svensen (1995)
- Here We Go Love! – The Beat Starring Dave Wakeling (2018) (executive producer)
