= Dave Wakeling =

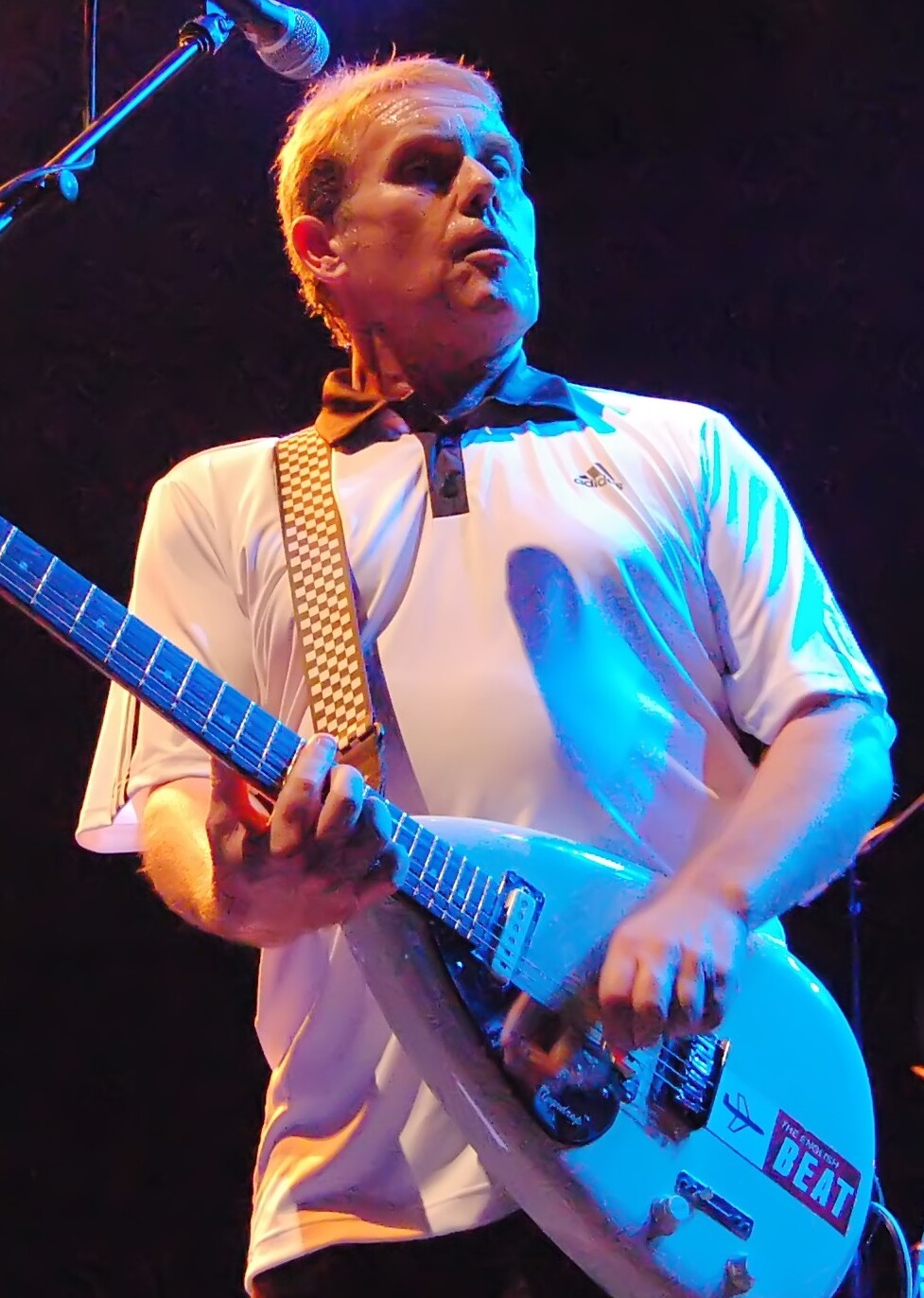
- Wakeling performing in 2009

Background information
- Born: 19 February 1956 (age 70); Birmingham, England
- Genres: New wave; ska; two-tone; post-punk
- Occupations: Singer; songwriter; musician
- Instruments: Vocals; guitar
- Years active: 1978–present
- Label: I.R.S.
- Member of: The Beat
- Formerly of: General Public
- Website: davewakeling.com

David Wakeling (born 19 February 1956) is an English singer, songwriter and musician, best known for his work with the band the Beat (known as the English Beat in the US) and General Public.

== Career ==
Wakeling began his professional career when he formed the band the Beat. The band's debut studio album, I Just Can't Stop It (1980), included "Mirror in the Bathroom", "Hands Off...She's Mine", and "Can't Get Used to Losing You", all of which charted within the Top 10 on the UK Singles Chart. The band also had UK hits from the studio albums Wha'ppen? (1981) and Special Beat Service (1982), but split up in 1983.

Wakeling then formed General Public with Ranking Roger in 1983, and they released their debut studio album, All the Rage, the next year. He also recorded two other studio albums with General Public, Hand to Mouth (1986) and Rub It Better (1995), however, the band disbanded in 1987.

In 1984, Wakeling, along with Ranking Roger, sang backing vocals on the song "Free Nelson Mandela" by the Special A.K.A. They also provided backing vocals on the Madness studio album Keep Moving, singing on the tracks "Waltz into Mischief" and "Victoria Gardens".

He then produced the soundtrack for the John Hughes romantic comedy film She's Having a Baby (1988), in which he also recorded the title track.

In 1991, Wakeling released his sole solo studio album, No Warning, on I.R.S. Records.

He recorded two new songs that feature in the Scooby-Doo! Mystery Incorporated episode "Dance of the Undead", which debuted in March 2013."

In 2018, the Beat album Here We Go Love was released.

Wakeling regularly performs as the English Beat in North America.

Throughout his career, Wakeling has mainly used a left-handed Vox Teardrop guitar, the Vox Mark III. He was initially drawn to this guitar as his favourite artist and guitarist Brian Jones of the Rolling Stones used one. "I wanted to be him and I used to play my cricket bat or my tennis racket and pretend it was a teardrop in the mirror when my mum had gone out shopping. I even bought a blond wig from a second-hand shop and I cut it out into a bob. As soon as I heard the front door I would think "Great, she's gone". I would take out the wig, the cricket bat and play in front of the mirror." On 8 April 2006, he donated his Vox of 26 years to the Rock and Roll Hall of Fame.

== Personal life ==
Wakeling is divorced, with two children. He resides in the San Fernando Valley, California.

In 1985, Wakeling mentioned in a press interview with Mother Jones magazine that he was bisexual.

== Discography ==
- No Warning (1991 I.R.S. Records)

Side one

1. "I Want More" (Dave Wakeling, Parthenon Huxley) – 4:16
2. "No Warning" (Wakeling, Mark Goldenberg) – 4:53
3. "Remember in the Dark" (Wakeling) – 5:23
4. "Every Time You Look at Me That Way" (Wakeling) – 4:12
5. "Sensation" (Wakeling, Mickey Billingham, Goldenberg) – 4:04

Side two

6. "Freedom Fighter" (Wakeling, Billingham) – 5:53
7. "One + One + One" (Wakeling, Goldenberg) – 5:15
8. "Sex with You" (Wakeling) – 3:32
9. "I'm Not Ready" (Wakeling, Billingham) – 3:58
10. "She's Having a Baby" (Wakeling, Ian Ritchie) – 3:44

Produced by Mark Goldenberg (tracks 1–9) and Steve Levine ("She's Having a Baby")
