= Say a Prayer (disambiguation) =

"Say a Prayer" is a song by Taylor Dayne from her album Greatest Hits. The phrase may also refer to:

- "Say a Prayer" (Breathe song)
- "Say a Prayer", a song by Sara Groves from her album Tell Me What You Know
