= Peace of Mind (Breathe album) =

- Front cover

Studio album by Breathe
- Released: 20 August 1990
- Recorded: 1988–1990
- Studios: Abbey Road (London); Rooster (West London); Roundhouse Recording (London)
- Genres: Pop; adult contemporary
- Length: 50:31
- Labels: Siren (UK); A&M (US) Virgin (international)
- Producers: Bob Sargeant; Breathe

Breathe chronology
All That Jazz (1987)	Peace of Mind (1990)

Singles from Peace Of Mind
- 1. "Say a Prayer" Released: August 1990 (US) & October 1990 (UK); 2. "Say Hello" Released: 3 September 1990 (UK only); 3. "Does She Love That Man?" Released: November 1990

Professional ratings
Review scores
Source	Rating
AllMusic	1.5/5 stars

Peace of Mind is the second and final studio album by English pop band Breathe. It was released on 20 August 1990 in the United Kingdom by Siren Records, and on 4 September 1990 by A&M records in the United States.

Two years after the band burst onto the music scene with the hits "Hands to Heaven" and "How Can I Fall?" from their debut album All That Jazz (1987), this album brought the group back to the charts with two more hit singles. Despite their renewed success from the two hit singles, reviews were generally mixed, with some praising lead singer David Glasper's "strong, soulful voice", while others dismissed the album itself as "a bit too seamless and proper to sink in deeply".

Peace of Mind peaked at No. 116 on the US Billboard 200, while the singles "Say a Prayer" and "Does She Love That Man?" both reached their highest positions on the US Adult Contemporary chart at Nos. 3 and 17, respectively. "Say Hello" was released as a single in the United Kingdom, where it peaked at No. 87 on the Top 100 singles chart.

The song "Where Angels Fear" was later covered by American contemporary Christian artist Clay Crosse under the title "Where Angels Dare" in 1993.

== Track listing ==
No.	Title	Writer(s)	Length
1.	"I Hear You're Doing Fine"	David Glasper; Francis White	4:23
2.	"Say a Prayer"	David Glasper; Marcus Lillington	3:51
3.	"Does She Love That Man?"	David Glasper; Marcus Lillington	4:47
4.	"Mississippi Water"	David Glasper; Marcus Lillington	3:52
5.	"Will the Circle Be Unbroken?"	David Glasper; Francis White	4:15
6.	"Woman"	David Glasper; Marcus Lillington	4:34
7.	"Got To Get By"	David Glasper; Francis White	3:34
8.	"Say Hello"	David Glasper; Francis White	4:32
9.	"Where Angels Fear"	David Glasper; Marcus Lillington	4:49
10.	"Without Your Love"	David Glasper; Marcus Lillington	3:55
11.	"A Perfect Love"	David Glasper; Marcus Lillington	4:02
12.	"Say a Prayer" (Remix)	David Glasper; Marcus Lillington	3:57
Total length:			50:31

== B-Sides ==
No.	Title	Writer(s)	Length
1.	"May Lightning Strike" (B side to Say a Prayer)	David Glasper; Marcus Lillington	4:25
2.	"Say It" (B side to Does She Love That Man)	David Glasper; Marcus Lillington	3:38

"May Lightning Strike" was only available in releases to the UK. "Say It" was only available in some releases.

== Interview cassette ==
"An Interview and Music with Breathe's David Glasper"

- Released: 1990
- Label: Siren
- Format: Cassette single

Promotional audio cassette featuring an interview with Glasper, inter-cut with a portion of Hands to Heaven, from their first album All That Jazz, and songs from their sophomore album Peace of Mind. In this interview, David talks about the background behind writing the album, and behind the meaning and ideas of some of the individual songs, like the three singles from that album, including Say Hello, Does She Love That Man and Say a Prayer, though other songs from the album are also discussed. Along with this, David discusses his inspirations for the songs, as well as inspirations from other artists.

== Personnel ==
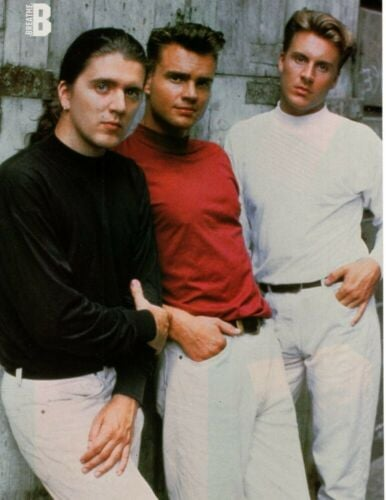
photo of Breathe personnel, taken in 1990, to help promote the release of Peace of Mind

=== Band ===
- David Glasper – lead vocals, backing vocals
- Marcus Lillington – keyboards, programming, guitars
- Ian Spice – drums

=== Guest musicians ===
- Richard Cottle – keyboards
- Merv De Peyer – keyboard programming
- Georgie Fame – organ
- Bob Sargeant – keyboards, organ
- Danny Schogger – keyboards
- Francis White – keyboards
- Jim Williams – guitars
- Jaz Lochrie – bass
- Charlie Morgan – drum programming
- Marc Fox – percussion
- Phil Smith – saxophones
- Andy Caine – backing vocals
- Carol Kenyon – backing vocals
- Beverley Green – backing vocals
- Juliet Roberts – backing vocals

=== Production ===
- Producers – Breathe and Bob Sargeant
- Engineer – John Gallen
- Assistant Engineers – Chris Brown, Tristan Powell and Simon Van Zwanenberg.
- Mixed by Julian Mendelsohn
- Mix Assistants – Steve Fitzmaurice and Danton Supple
- Remixing – Daniel Abraham on "Say A Prayer"
- Mastered by Ian Cooper
- A&R – Simon Hicks
- Art Direction and Design – John Warwicker at Vivid I.D.
- Management – Jonny Too Bad and Paul King
- Photography – Martin Brading

== Chart performance ==
Chart (1990–91)	Peak position
US Billboard 200	116

In the U.S., Peace of Mind spent 20 weeks on the Billboard 200 from 22 September 1990, peaking at No. 116 on 3 November. In the UK, the album failed to enter the Top 100 albums chart.

== Singles ==
Three singles were issued from Peace of Mind: "Say a Prayer" was issued in the United States during August 1990 as the first single from the album. In the United Kingdom, Siren Records released "Say Hello" as the first album single on 3 September 1990, followed in October by "Say a Prayer". The third single, "Does She Love That Man?" was released in November 1990, with A&M Records in the United States billing the artist as ‘Breathe featuring David Glasper’.

Year	Month	Single	Peak chart positions					B-Side
Year	Month	Single	UK	AUS	CAN	US	US AC	B-Side
1990	Aug	"Say a Prayer"	93	92	6	21	3	"Say a Prayer" [Save My Soul] (US) / "May Lightning Strike" (UK)
1990	Sep	"Say Hello"	87	x	x	x	x	"All That Jazz"
1990	Nov	"Does She Love That Man?"	—	—	19	34	17	"Say It" (US) / "Where Angels Fear" (UK)
"—" denotes releases that did not chart, "x" denotes releases not released in that country

While a fourth commercial single did not eventuate from Peace of Mind, A&M Records issued "Without Your Love" to radio in the U.S. as a promotional single, with the artist being billed again as ‘Breathe featuring David Glasper’.
