= Billboard Year-End =

Billboard magazine charts

Billboard Year-End charts are cumulative rankings of entries in Billboard magazine charts in the United States in any given chart year. Several hundred Year-End charts are now published by Billboard, the most important of which are the single or album charts based on Hot 100 and Billboard 200 respectively.

Billboard's "chart year" runs from the first Billboard "week" of December to the final week in November, but because the Billboard week is dated in advance of publication, the last calendar week for which sales are counted is usually the third week in November. This altered calendar allows for Billboard to calculate year-end charts and release them in time for its final print issue in the last week of December.

Due to this methodology, albums at the peak of their popularity at the time of the November/December chart-year cutoff many times end up ranked lower than one would expect on a year-end tally, yet are ranked on the following year's chart as well, as their cumulative points are split between the two chart years.

== History ==
Various listings, such as top radio tunes, popular songs on jukebox, top artists, and best-selling sheet music of the year, had been published for a number of years. Best-selling records of the year based on Billboard's Music Popularity Charts was also published for 1942. A chart covering the year 1945 based on "Honor Roll of Hits", where the same song by different artists were amalgamated into one, was published.

In January 1947, Billboard released its inaugural charts for the year 1946, initially called "Annual Music Record Poll", which included records charts where songs by different artists were listed separately. In the early years, the annual charts for a particular year were dated to January the following year. Starting in 1952, the release date was moved earlier to December the same year to provide disk jockeys with listings for their end-of-year programming. The chart year therefore also shifted, for example, the year of 1952 covered the first week of the year until the December 20 issue and the charts published dated December 27, while the 1953 year-end charts were dated December 19. The published dates have fluctuated, but Billboard's chart year now typically runs from the first Billboard "week" of December to the final week of November.

== Methodology ==
Prior to incorporating chart data from Nielsen SoundScan (from 1991), year-end charts were calculated by an inverse-point system based solely on a title's performance (for example a single appearing on the Billboard Hot 100 would be given one point for a week spent at position 100, two points for a week spent at position ninety-nine, and so forth, up to 100 points for each week spent at number one). Other factors including the total weeks a song spent on the chart and at its peak position were calculated into its year-end total. The same method was used for albums based on the Billboard 200, and songs appearing on the other charts (e.g. Hot Country Singles).

After Billboard began obtaining sales and airplay information from Nielsen SoundScan and Nielsen Broadcast Data Systems, the year-end charts are now calculated by a very straightforward cumulative total of yearlong sales (or sales and airplay) points. This gives a more accurate picture of any given year's most popular titles, as an entry that hypothetically spent nine weeks at number one in the spring could possibly have earned fewer cumulative points than one spending six weeks at number three in January.

Exceptions appeared to be in the 1980s as songs with chart runs were as high as they were as if they were in the chart for a whole year. Two examples are "Desire" by U2 and "How Can I Fall?" by Breathe (both in 1988), which both peaked at number 3 in November and December, respectively. "Desire" came in at number 56 in the 1988 year-end, then "How Can I Fall?" would take the number 27 spot in 1989, despite "Desire" appearing in only nine issues of the chart in the 1988 charting year, and "How Can I Fall?" having appeared in five in 1989. ("He's So Shy" had 14 in the 1980 charting year and in 12 in that of 1981, but appeared in neither year-end.)

Songs are also not always placed as high in the Decade-End and All Time charts as they were in the Year-End. In the Decade-End, an example is in the 2008 year end which showed "No Air" by Jordin Sparks and Chris Brown and "I Kissed a Girl" by Katy Perry at numbers six and 14 respectively, but only "I Kissed a Girl" was in the decade-end of the two, at number 66. And another example is from the 1979 year end where "My Sharona" by The Knack is the number one song of 1979, but lower than "Hot Stuff" by Donna Summer in the all time chart. ("My Sharona" is number 95, "Hot Stuff" at No. 87 and number seven in the 1979 year-end.)

George Michael, the Beatles, Elton John (under Dionne & Friends for the song "That's What Friends Are For"), Elvis Presley, Percy Faith and Bruno Mars are the only artists to have ever achieved two year-end number-ones. The Beatles, Usher and Justin Bieber are the only three artists to hold the top-two positions of the Year-End Hot 100.

== Billboard Number One Awards (1971–1989) ==
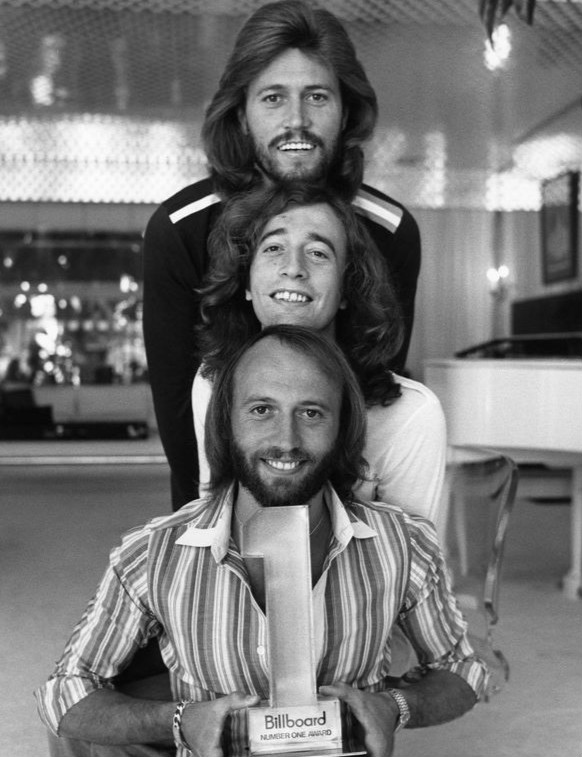
Bee Gees with a trophy of the 1977 Billboard Number One Awards

Prior to the inauguration of the Billboard Music Awards in 1990, the magazine had the "Number One Awards" to honor the top-performing artists in each of the year-end chart categories. The first Billboard Number One Awards presentation was hosted by Gary Owens in August 1972 at Franco's La Taverna Restaurant, Los Angeles, where trophies were presented to artists who topped the 1971 year-end charts.

List of Top Artist winners at the Billboard Number One Awards
Year	Top Artist of the Year	Top Albums Artist	Top Singles Artist	Ref
1971	—N/a	Chicago	Three Dog Night	
1972	—N/a	Roberta Flack	Al Green (tie); Michael Jackson (tie)	
1973	—N/a	Deep Purple	Gladys Knight & the Pips	
1974	—N/a	Jim Croce	Gladys Knight & the Pips	
1975	—N/a	Elton John	John Denver (male); Linda Ronstadt (female); America (group)	
1976	—N/a	Aerosmith	Diana Ross	
1977	Stevie Wonder (male); Linda Ronstadt (female); Fleetwood Mac (group)	Fleetwood Mac	Rod Stewart	
1978	Andy Gibb (male); Linda Ronstadt (female); Bee Gees (group)	Bee Gees	Bee Gees	
1979	Billy Joel (male); Donna Summer (female); Bee Gees (group)	Billy Joel	Donna Summer	
1980	Kenny Rogers (male); Donna Summer (female); Pink Floyd (group)	Pink Floyd	Michael Jackson	
1981	REO Speedwagon	REO Speedwagon	Kenny Rogers	
1982	The Go-Go's	The Go-Go's	Olivia Newton-John	
1983	Michael Jackson	Michael Jackson	Michael Jackson	
1984	Lionel Richie	Lionel Richie	Lionel Richie	
1985	Madonna	Prince and the Revolution	Madonna	
1986	Whitney Houston	Whitney Houston	Janet Jackson	
1987	Bon Jovi	Bon Jovi	Madonna	
1988	George Michael	George Michael	George Michael	
1989	New Kids on the Block	Guns N' Roses	Bobby Brown	

== Billboard year-end number ones ==
Pop
Singles: Best Sellers in Stores ('40s-1958), Billboard Hot 100 (1958-present)
Albums: Best-Selling Popular Albums (1955–1956), Best-Selling Pop Albums (1956–1957), Best-Selling Pop LPs (1957–1959), Top LPs (1963–1972), Top LPs & Tapes (1972–1984), Top 200 Albums (1984), Top Pop Albums (1985–1991), The Billboard 200 Top Albums (1991–1992), Billboard 200 (1992-present), Top Artists (1981-present)

Between 1959 and 1963 the chart was divided in a stereo chart and a mono chart and were named Best-Selling Stereophonic LPs and Best-Selling Monophonic LPs (1959–1960), Stereo Action Charts and Mono Action Charts (1960–1961), Action Albums—Stereophonic and Action Albums—Monophonic (1961) and Top LPs—Stereo and Top LPs—Monaural (1961–1963).

R&B / Soul / Hip-hop
Singles: Hot Soul Singles, Hot Black Singles, Hot R&B Singles, Hot R&B/Hip-Hop Singles & Tracks, Hot R&B/Hip-Hop Songs (Note: Billboard did not publish a singles chart for R&B songs from late 1963 through early 1965.)
Albums: Top Soul Albums, Top Black Albums, Top R&B/Hip-Hop Albums
Country
Singles: Hot Country Singles, Hot Country Singles & Tracks, Hot Country Songs
Albums: Top Country Albums

== See also ==
- List of best-selling albums by year in the United States

== Sources ==
- Joel Whitburn's Top Pop Singles 1955–2002 (ISBN 0-89820-155-1)
- Joel Whitburn Presents the Billboard Albums, 6th edition, (ISBN 0-89820-166-7)
- Additional information obtained can be verified within Billboard's online archive services and print editions of the magazine.
