= Out of the Grey (disambiguation) =

Out of the Grey are a Contemporary Christian music project.

Out of the Grey may also refer to:

- Out of the Grey (The Dream Syndicate album) the 1986 release by the American alternative rock band The Dream Syndicate
- Out of the Grey (Out of the Grey album) the 1991 self-titled debut album by the American Christian music band
