= The Other Side of Something =

Studio album by Sara Groves
- Released: March 23, 2004
- Studios: Sound Kitchen (Franklin, Tennessee); Art House (Nashville, Tennessee)
- Genres: CCM, acoustic, folk
- Length: 47:24
- Label: INO
- Producers: Charlie Peacock; Nate Sabin

Sara Groves chronology
All Right Here (2002)	The Other Side of Something (2004)	Add to the Beauty (2005)

The Other Side of Something is the third studio album and fourth album overall from Christian singer and songwriter Sara Groves, and it released on March 23, 2004, by INO Records. The producers on the album is Charlie Peacock and Nate Sabin. This release became critically acclaimed and commercially successful.

== Critical reception ==
Professional ratings
Review scores
Source	Rating
CCM Magazine	A−
Christianity Today	5/5 stars
Cross Rhythms	8/10 squares
Jesus Freak Hideout	4.5/5 stars
The Phantom Tollbooth	4/5 stars

The Other Side of Something garnered critical acclaim from music critics. At Christianity Today, Russ Breimeier rated the album five stars, stating that "It's to the point where you can reliably count on Sara Groves for smart, sincere pop music that stimulates the mind and soul" and on this album she "takes it one step further." Peter Bate of Cross Rhythms rated it eight out of ten squares, writing that it comes with "quality songwriting" that "resonates nicely." At CCM Magazine, Lizza Connor graded the album an A−, saying that the album "covers new lyrical ground, the sonic element also swings to something unique." Founder John DiBiase of Jesus Freak Hideout rated the album four-and-a-half stars, affirming that "The Other Side Of Something should not be missed." At The Phantom Tollbooth, Brian A. Smith rated the album four tocks, highlighting that "The result is eleven songs that are real, raw, and sometimes painful, as she not only reveals her own weaknesses, but our as well if we are paying attention to the lyrics."

== Commercial performance ==
For the Billboard charting week of April 10, 2004, The Other Side of Something was the No. 29 most sold album in the Christian music market via the Christian Albums position. Also, it placed at No. 32 on the breaking-and-entry chart the Heatseekers Albums.

== Track listing ==
No.	Title	Writer(s)	Length
1.	"The One Thing I Know"	Sara Groves	3:12
2.	"Jeremiah"	Groves	6:04
3.	"Compelled"	Groves, Charlie Peacock	4:28
4.	"Roll to the Middle"	Groves	3:10
5.	"What I Thought I Wanted"	Groves	5:48
6.	"Esther"	Groves	4:04
7.	"Boxer"	Groves	5:01
8.	"Undone"	Groves	3:02
9.	"All I Need"	Groves	4:09
10.	"Like a Skin"	Groves	2:53
11.	"Come Thou Fount"	public domain, John Wyeth	5:33
Total length:			47:24

== Personnel ==
Musicians

- Sara Groves – vocals, arrangements (11)
- Charlie Peacock – acoustic piano (1, 3, 6), programming (1, 3, 7), keyboards (3, 6), Rhodes electric piano (7)
- Jeff Roach – keyboards (2, 4, 5, 8–11)
- Roger Smith – Hammond B3 organ (6, 7)
- Scott Denté – acoustic guitar (1, 3)
- Jerry McPherson – electric guitar (1, 3, 6, 7), guitars (2, 4, 5, 8–11), dobro (6)
- Matt Patrick – additional guitars (2), acoustic guitar (11), dulcimer (11)
- Mark Hill – bass (1, 3, 6)
- Matt Pierson – bass (2, 4, 5, 8–11)
- Danny O'Lannerghty – acoustic bass (7)
- Steve Brewster – drums, percussion (4, 5, 8–11)
- Ken Lewis – percussion (1, 3, 6)
- John Catchings – cello (2, 5, 10)
- Monisa Angell – viola (5, 10)
- David Davidson – violin (7)
- Nate Sabin – harmonica (9)
- Dick Hensold – Northumbrian pipes (11)

Background vocalists

- Chris Eaton – backing vocals (1, 3, 6)
- Sara Groves – backing vocals (1–3, 5–11)
- Charlie Peacock – backing vocals (1, 7)
- Chris Brown – backing vocals (2)
- Matt Patrick – backing vocals (2, 9)
- Lori Sabin – backing vocals (2, 5, 9)
- Nate Sabin – backing vocals (2, 5, 9–11)
- Chris Altamirano – backing vocals (5, 11)
- Harmony LeBeff – backing vocals (5)
- Sara Renner – backing vocals (5)
- Billy Steele – backing vocals (5)
- Terry Greener – backing vocals (9)
- Kirby Groves – backing vocals (9)
- Troy Groves – backing vocals (9)
- Becca Harrington – backing vocals (9)
- Greyley Sabin – backing vocals (9)
- Josh Stigen – backing vocals (9)

=== Production ===
- Troy Groves – executive producer
- Charlie Peacock – producer (1, 3, 6, 7)
- Nate Sabin – producer (2, 4, 5, 8–11)
- Richie Biggs – recording, mixing
- David Streit – assistant engineer (1, 3, 6, 7)
- Richard Dodd – mastering at Vital Recordings (Nashville, Tennessee)
- Leah Payne – budget administrator (1, 3, 6, 7)
- Dana Salsedo – creative director, stylist
- Wayne Brezinka – design
- Kristin Barlowe – photography
- Kellen Whiteman – stylist
- Sheila Davis – hair, make-up

== Charts ==
Chart (2004)	Peak position
US Christian Albums (Billboard)	29
US Heatseekers Albums (Billboard)	32
