= Say Hello (disambiguation) =

"Say Hello" is a 2005 song by Deep Dish.

Say Hello may also refer to:

- "Say Hello" (Breathe song), 1990
- "Say Hello", a song by April Wine from Harder ... Faster, 1979
- "Say Hello", a song by Drugstore from White Magic for Lovers, 1998
- "Say Hello", a song by Jay-Z from American Gangster, 2007
- "Say Hello", a song by Texas, a B-side from "Can't Resist", 2005
