= Diamond Days =

Diamond Days may refer to:

== Music ==
=== Albums ===
- Diamond Days (The Outfield album), released in 1990
- Diamond Days (Out of the Grey album), released in 1994
- Diamond Days (Eric Bibb album), released in 2007
- Collection Album Vol.1 Diamond Days, by Lia (Japanese singer) 2007
- Diamond Days (Bento album), Ben Gillies solo album 2012

=== Songs ===
- "Diamond Days", single by Kids in Glass Houses from In Gold Blood
- "Diamond Days", single by Mary Black, written by Jimmy MacCarthy 1985
- "Diamond Days" a song written by Chris Murphy and performed on season 4 of Australian Idol
- "Diamond Days", single by Cruel Youth from +30mg

=== Other ===
- Diamond Day Records, the label of The Steepwater Band
- Diamond Days, a five-week special event concluding Steven Universe's fifth and final season
