= Floodplain (Sara Groves album) =

Studio album by Sara Groves
- Released: November 6, 2015
- Genres: Contemporary Christian music, folk
- Length: 50:41
- Labels: Fair Trade, Columbia
- Producers: Brown Bannister; Steve Brewster; Scott Denté; Sara Groves; Daniel Phelps; Matt Pierson

Sara Groves chronology
Invisible Empires (2011)	Floodplain (2015)

Floodplain is the eighth studio album and twelfth album overall from Sara Groves. Fair Trade Services alongside Columbia Records released the album on November 6, 2015. Groves worked with Brown Bannister, Steve Brewster, Scott Dente, Daniel Phelps, and Matt Pierson, in the production of this album.

Sara found her inspiration for the album while jogging along the Mississippi River in the Minneapolis-Saint Paul area when she saw the juxtaposition of a homeless man near the river and a local mansion, the James J. Hill House, on the blufftop. Keeping with the album's theme of floodplain on the Mississippi, the album cover uses an 1874 illustration of the Eads Bridge, the first bridge to cross the Mississippi in St. Louis, Missouri.

== Critical reception ==
Professional ratings
Review scores
Source	Rating
CCM Magazine	4/5 stars
The Christian Beat	4.5/5 stars
Jesus Freak Hideout	4/5 stars
New Release Today	5/5 stars

Indicating in a four star review by CCM Magazine, Andy Argyrakis responds, "the 13 pensive pop tracks have a heavy yet hopeful heart placed strikingly across her own production". Mark Rice, giving the album four stars for Jesus Freak Hideout, describes, "as with many of Grove's albums containing complex themes and simple, organic music, it does take a certain mindset and repeated listens to really appreciate Floodplain in all its depth." Awarding the album five stars at New Release Today, Kevin Davis states, "Floodplain is a standout, profound listening experience...This is truly a great album and a moving and prayerful listening experience which reflects how we are bound together as believers in faith, love and vulnerability." Madeleine Dittmer, rating the album four and a half stars from The Christian Beat, says, "Sara Groves masterfully creates a beautiful collection of songs in this new album...Floodplain is an impressive album that will draw you in and invite you to deepen your relationship with God." Reviewing the album for The Phantom Tollbooth, Bert Saraco writes, "Floodplain is another brilliant album by Sara Groves. An accessible work of wisdom and beauty: lyrically poetic and musically smart, Floodplain is still essentially a pop album replete with hooks and well-informed by the best of the classic rock era."

== Track listing ==
All tracks are written by Sara Groves, except those noted.

No.	Title	Writer(s)	Length
1.	"This Cup"	Groves, Ellie Holcomb	4:17
2.	"Expedition"		3:48
3.	"Second Guess Girl"		3:33
4.	"Floodplain"		3:34
5.	"Enough"	Groves, Julie Masen, Sarah Masen	3:49
6.	"Native Tongue"		4:11
7.	"I've Been Here Before"		3:50
8.	"On Your Mark"		4:34
9.	"I Feel the Love Between Us"		4:21
10.	"Signal"		4:53
11.	"Your Reality"		3:10
12.	"My Dream"		4:06
13.	"Expedition (Reprise)"		2:35
Total length:			50:41

== Personnel ==
- Sara Groves – vocals
- Matt Pierson – Moog keyboards, bass
- Scott Denté – acoustic guitars
- Dan Phelps – electric guitars
- Steve Brewster – drums, percussion

=== Production ===
- Brown Bannister – producer, vocal recording
- Steve Brewster – producer
- Scott Denté – producer
- Sara Groves – producer
- Dan Phelps – producer
- Matt Pierson – producer
- Don Chaffer – extra production (7)
- Martin Woodlee – recording
- Ben Gowell – mixing
- Sam Hofstedt – assistant engineer
- Barrett Miller – assistant engineer
- AJ Mather – mix assistant

== Chart performance ==
Chart (2015)	Peak position
US Top Christian Albums (Billboard)	8
US Americana/Folk Albums (Billboard)	8
US Top Rock Albums (Billboard)	24
