= When the Saints (disambiguation) =

When the Saints is typically shorthand for the title of the traditional hymn "When the Saints Go Marching In".

When the Saints may also refer to:

- "When the Saints Go Marching In" (sports anthem), the hymn adapted for use in sports stadiums
- "When the Saints", a song by Sara Groves from her album Tell Me What You Know
- When the Saints, a novel by Dave Duncan
