= Don't Tell Me Lies =

1986 single by Breathe

- 1986 U.K. single cover

Single by Breathe

from the album All That Jazz
- B-side: "Moments"
- Released: January 1986
- Recorded: 1985
- Genre: Synth-pop; new wave
- Length: 3:44
- Label: Siren Records
- Songwriters: David Glasper; Marcus Lillington; Ian Spice; Michael Delahunty
- Producer: Bob Sargeant

Breathe singles chronology
"Don't Tell Me Lies" (1986)	"In All Honesty" (1986)

"Don't Tell Me Lies" is the debut single by British band Breathe. An original composition by the group, the lyrics were written by David Glasper, with music by Marcus Lillington, Ian Spice and Michael Delahunty.

The song was recorded in 1985 with producer Bob Sargeant, and originally released as a single in the United Kingdom in January 1986. The single peaked at #77 on the UK Singles Chart in March 1986 and provided the band with its first national exposure.

"Don't Tell Me Lies" was not included by Siren Records on the original 10-track British issue of the album All That Jazz. In the United States however, A&M Records substituted album track 9 "For Love or Money" with a special U.S. edit of the extended dance mix of “Don’t Tell Me Lies,” remixed by John Morales. This same track was later added to the British version of album upon its re-release with 11 tracks in September 1988.

== Track listings ==
UK 7” Single (SIREN 11)

A. "Don’t Tell Me Lies" - 3:44

B. "Moments" - 3:48

UK 12” Single (SIREN 11-12)

A. "Don’t Tell Me Lies" [Extended Version] - 5:40

B. "Moments" [Extended Version] - 4:26

UK Double 12” Single (SIREN 11-13)

A1. "Don’t Tell Me Lies" [Extended Version] - 5:40

A2. "Moments" [Extended Version] - 4:26

B1. "Don’t Tell Me Lies" [Dance Mix] - 6:49

B2. "Don’t Tell Me Lies" [12” Dub Mix] - 3:44

Lyrics by David Glasper; Music by Marcus Lillington, Ian Spice, Michael Delahunty. All songs published by Virgin Music, Inc.

== Personnel ==
=== Band ===
- David Glasper (vocals)
- Marcus Lillington (guitar)
- Michael Delahunty (bass guitar)
- Ian Spice (drums)

=== Production ===
- Remixing: John Morales (Don’t Tell Me Lies [Dance Mix])
- Design: Caryn Gough
- Photography: Amanda Searle

== Music video ==
The original music video for "Don't Tell Me Lies" was produced by Roger Hunt, directed by Simon Milne, and carries a production date of 20 December 1985.

== Chart performance ==
"Don't Tell Me Lies" spent a total of five weeks on the Top 100 singles chart in the United Kingdom. Charting at #94 on 8 February 1986, the single dropped out of the top 100 the following week. On 22 February it re-entered at #82, reaching #80 the next week, before peaking at #77 on 8 March 1986. The single sat at #100 for its final week on the chart.

Chart (1986)	Peak position
UK Singles Chart	77

== 1989 re-release ==
"Don't Tell Me Lies (Re-release)"
- 1989 U.S. single cover

Single by Breathe

from the album All That Jazz
- B-side: "Liberties of Love" (US); "Monday Morning Blues" (UK)
- Released: 3 January 1989
- Recorded: 1985
- Genre: Synth-pop; new wave
- Length: 3:44
- Label: A&M Records; Siren Records
- Songwriters: David Glasper; Marcus Lillington; Ian Spice; Michael Delahunty
- Producers: Bob Sargeant; Chris Porter; Harvey Goldberg

Breathe singles chronology
"How Can I Fall?" (1988)	"Don't Tell Me Lies (Re-release)" (1989)	"All This I Should Have Known" (1989)

Alternative Cover 1
- 1989 U.K. & International single cover

Audio sample
- "Don't Tell Me Lies (1989)": file; help

After the success of “Hands to Heaven” and “How Can I Fall?”, A&M Records released “Don’t Tell Me Lies” in a new mix by Tom Lord-Alge on 3 January 1989 as Breathe’s fourth single in the United States. The song peaked at #10 on the Billboard Hot 100 singles chart, and at #5 on the Billboard Hot Adult Contemporary chart.

Siren Records waited until March 1989 before issuing the Lord-Alge mix as the group’s ninth single in Britain, where it reached #45 on the Top 100 singles chart.

=== Track listings ===
UK 7” single (SIREN SRN109) ^{[a]}

A. "Don’t Tell Me Lies" [1989 Final 7” Version] - 3:44

B. "Monday Morning Blues" - 3:58

^{^a}The U.K. 7” single was also offered in a limited-edition box, with an A3 poster of the band, plus a postcard for each of the three band members (SRNX 109).

US 7” single (A&M AM-1267) Cassette Single (A&M TS-1267) ^{[b]}

A. "Don’t Tell Me Lies" [1989 Final 7” Version] - 3:44

B. "Liberties of Love" - 3:30

^{^b}The U.S. cassette single contains both tracks on each side of the cassette.

UK 12” single (SIREN SRNT109)

A1. "Don’t Tell Me Lies" [Extended Version] - 5:40

B1. "Don’t Tell Me Lies" [1989 Final 7” Version] - 3:44

B2. "Monday Morning Blues" - 3:58

US 12” single (A&M SP-12296)

A1. "Don’t Tell Me Lies" [12” Mix] - 5:38

A2. "Don’t Tell Me Lies" [1989 Final 7” Version] - 3:41

B1. "Don’t Tell Me Lies" [Full Length Version] - 4:08

B2. "Liberties of Love" - 3:30

UK CD mini-single (SIREN SRNCD 109)

1. "Don’t Tell Me Lies" [1989 Final 7” Version] - 3:44
2. "Liberties of Love" [Extended Version] - 6:21
3. "Monday Morning Blues" - 3:58
4. "Don’t Tell Me Lies" [Extended Version] - 5:40

All songs written by David Glasper, Marcus Lillington, Michael Delahunty and Ian Spice except “Liberties Of Love” written by David Glasper/Danny Schogger. All songs published by Virgin Music, Inc. except “Liberties Of Love” published by Virgin Music, Inc./Schogger Songs Ltd.

Five different versions of "Don't Tell Me Lies" are presented on the 2013 deluxe edition of All That Jazz.

=== Music video ===
A new music video for "Don't Tell Me Lies" directed by The Molotov Brothers

== Personnel ==
=== Band ===
- David Glasper (vocals)
- Marcus Lillington (guitar)
- Michael Delahunty (bass guitar)
- Ian Spice (drums)

=== Production ===
- Engineer: Chris Porter (“Monday Morning Blues”); John Madden (“Liberties Of Love”).
- Mixing: Bob Sargeant (“Don’t Tell Me Lies”); Chris Porter (“Liberties Of Love”); Harvey Goldberg (“Liberties Of Love” [Extended Version]).
- Remixing: Tom Lord-Alge (“Don’t Tell Me Lies”).
- Design: Bill Smith Design.
- Photography: Peter Mountain (U.K. cover).

== Chart performance ==
In the United States, "Don't Tell Me Lies" debuted at #96 on the Billboard Hot 100 singles chart for the week of 14 January 1989. Peaking at #10 on March 18, the song spent a total of sixteen weeks in the top 100. In reaching #10, Breathe became the first act in A&M’s 27-year history to pull three top ten singles from its debut album. On the Billboard Hot Adult Contemporary chart, the song reached #5 on 8 April 1989, spending a total of twenty weeks on that chart after its debut on January 21.

In the United Kingdom, "Don't Tell Me Lies" hit a top placing of #45 in the Top 100 singles on March 25, and spent six weeks on the chart.

Chart (1989)	Peak position
Canada RPM Top Singles	10
UK Singles Chart	45
US Billboard Hot 100	10
US Billboard Adult Contemporary	5
