= Fireflies and Songs =

Studio album by Sara Groves
- Released: November 17, 2009
- Studios: Art House (Nashville, Tennessee); Milton Studio (St. Paul, Minnesota)
- Genres: Contemporary Christian music, acoustic, folk
- Length: 40:58
- Label: Fair Trade/Columbia/Integrity
- Producer: Charlie Peacock

Sara Groves chronology
Tell Me What You Know (2007)	Fireflies and Songs (2009)	Invisible Empires (2011)

Fireflies and Songs is the sixth studio album and ninth overall album from Christian singer and songwriter Sara Groves, and it was released on November 17, 2009, by Fair Trade, Columbia Records and Integrity Music. The producer of the album is Charlie Peacock. This release became critically acclaimed and commercially successful.

== Background ==
The album was released on November 17, 2009, by Fair Trade, Columbia and Integrity, and it was produced by Charlie Peacock. This was the sixth studio album and ninth album overall from the songstress.

== Critical reception ==
Professional ratings
Review scores
Source	Rating
Allmusic	3.5/5 stars
Alpha Omega News	B+
Christian Broadcasting Network	3.5/5 spins
Christian Music Review	95%
Christianity Today	5/5 stars
Cross Rhythms	10/10 squares
Jesus Freak Hideout	4/5 stars
Louder Than the Music	2/5 stars
The Phantom Tollbooth	4.5/5 stars

Fireflies and Songs garnered critical acclaim from music critics. At Christianity Today, Andrew Greer rated the album five stars, evoking that the release "probes yet deeper, and even more beautifully, into the fears, doubts, and joys of the human soul." Andree Farias of Allmusic rated the album three-and-a-half stars, highlighting that "Groves' big break may still be farther than ever before, but it's doubtful she cares: Fireflies and Songs is proof she is in this for the long haul." At Cross Rhythms, Peter Timmis rated the album ten out of ten squares, and felt that "the listener is left wanting more."

Kevin Davis of Christian Music Review gave the album a 95-percent, calling it an "excellent work" on which "Sara’s excellent songwriting and captivating piano-based singer-songwriter style have made her my favorite female artist in all of Christian music." At Jesus Freak Hideout, Laura Nunnery Love rated the album four stars, affirming that the release "is an excellent addition to the Sara Groves catalogue." Jen Rose also of Jesus Freak Hideout rated the album four stars, calling the album "some of her most poetic, vulnerable, and transparent music to date." At The Phantom Tollbooth, Bert Saraco rated the album four-and-a-half tocks, felling that her music "stings like a bee." Brian A. Smith also of The Phantom Tollbooth rated the album four-and-a-half tocks, saying that he's "never been displeased with a Groves album, but some stand out more than others", and this "is one of them."

At Christian Broadcasting Network, Monique Derr rated the album three-and-a-half spins, noting how the listener will find "Smooth vocals, comforting words, and strong instrumentation" on the album, and it contains Groves' "rich melodies and silky tone quality make for a relaxing, inspiring, and positive listening experience." Ken Wiegman of Alpha Omega News graded the album a B+, commenting that "The new album is peaceful and a joy to listen to and the personal approach is a welcomed new tool for an already superior artist such as Sara Groves." However, Louder Than the Music' Suzanne Physick rated the album two stars, criticizing that "It's hard to differentiate between most of the songs and the outcome is purely an album of pleasant background music with the occasional lyrical high."

== Commercial performance ==
For the Billboard charting week of December 5, 2009, Fireflies and Songs was the No. 13 most sold album in the Christian music market via the Christian Albums position, and it was the No. 156 Top Current Album, which are just the new albums out minus the catalog titles in The 200.

For the Billboard charting week of May 29, 2010, the album was the No. 119 most sold album in the entirety of the United States via The Billboard 200 placement, and it was the No. 5 most sold album in the Christian music market segment via the Christian Albums position. In addition, the album was the No. 7 folk album sold by the Folk Albums chart, and it was the No. 47 most sold album in the rock albums category via the Top Rock Albums charting. It was the No. 116 Top Current Album.

== Track listing ==
Tracklist
No.	Title	Writer(s)	Length
1.	"Fireflies and Songs"	Sara Groves	3:24
2.	"From This One Place"	Groves	3:40
3.	"Different Kinds of Happy"	Groves	4:16
4.	"Twice as Good"	Groves, Christa Wells	3:38
5.	"It's Me"	Groves	5:27
6.	"This House"	Groves	3:02
7.	"Setting Up the Pins"	Groves	2:43
8.	"Love"	Groves	3:11
9.	"Like a Lake"	Groves	4:38
10.	"Eyes Wide Open"	Groves	3:30
11.	"Joy Is in Our Hearts"	Groves	3:29
Total length:			40:58

== Personnel ==
- Sara Groves – vocals, acoustic piano (1–6, 8–11), backing vocals (2–4, 6, 9, 11)
- Jeff Taylor – accordion (1, 6, 8)
- Charlie Peacock – string arrangements (1, 8), Wurlitzer electric piano (3, 7, 9), trumpet (3, 5), Rhodes electric piano (4, 5, 9, 11), vibraphone (4, 8), woodwind (5), orchestra percussion (5), keyboards (6, 10), percussion (8)
- Ben Gowell – acoustic guitar (1, 6, 10, 11), electric guitar (1, 3, 4, 9, 10), loops (7), keyboards (10), string arrangements (11), backing vocals (11)
- Jerry McPherson – guitars (2), electric guitar (4, 5, 8–11), acoustic guitar (7)
- Scott Denté – acoustic guitar (3)
- Bruce Bouton – lap steel guitar (1, 2, 5, 6)
- Andy Leftwich – mandolin (1, 7)
- Aaron Fabbrini – bass, percussion (7), backing vocals (11)
- Zach Miller – drums, percussion (2, 6, 7, 10), backing vocals (11)
- Buddy Greene – harmonica (7)
- David Davidson – strings (1, 8)
- Matt Slocum – strings (1, 8), cello (11)
- Matthew Perryman Jones – backing vocals (1, 2, 9)
- Brian Eichenberger – backing vocals (7, 11)

=== Production ===
- Troy Groves – executive producer
- Jeff Moseley – executive producer
- Charlie Peacock – producer, overdub engineer
- Andy Hunt – tracking engineer
- Richie Biggs – overdub engineer
- Ben Gowell – tracking engineer, overdub engineer, editing
- Shane D. Wilson – mixing
- Sarah Deane – mix coordinator
- Jim DeMain – mastering at Yes Master (Nashville, Tennessee)
- Wayne Brezinka – art direction, design, illustration
- Jamie Rau – art direction, photography

== Charts ==
Chart (2009)	Peak position
US Top Christian Albums (Billboard)	13
Chart (2010)	Peak position
US Billboard 200	119
US Top Christian Albums (Billboard)	5
US Americana/Folk Albums (Billboard)	7
US Top Rock Albums (Billboard)	47
