= What Do I Know (disambiguation) =

"What Do I Know" is a song by Ricochet from their self-titled debut album.

What Do I Know may also refer to:

- "What Do I Know?", a song by Ed Sheeran from the album ÷
- "What Do I Know", a song by Sara Groves from the album Conversations

== See also ==
- "Que sçay-je? " (What do I know?), the personal motto of French philosopher Michel de Montaigne
- Que sais-je?, a French book series
