= Add to the Beauty =

Studio album by Sara Groves
- Released: October 4, 2005
- Recorded: May–October 2004
- Studio: Emerald Sound Studios and Oxford Sound (Nashville, Tennessee); McPherson Studios (Minneapolis, Minnesota)
- Genre: Contemporary Christian music
- Length: 58:53
- Label: Sony BMG
- Producer: Brown Bannister

Sara Groves chronology
The Other Side of Something (2004)	Add to the Beauty (2005)	Tell Me What You Know (2008)

Add to the Beauty, a contemporary Christian album, is the fourth studio album and fifth album overall by Sara Groves. It was released in the United States on October 4, 2005, by Sony BMG. As a theme for her album, Christian singer-songwriter Sara Groves focused on the concept that "God has invited us, as mere human beings, to add to the beauty of his plan and creation." As a result, she has concocted a hopeful album that invites listeners to rise above the depravity of this world, and to contribute to its betterment.

== Background ==
The album released on October 4, 2005, by INO Records, and the producer is Brown Bannister. The album is the fourth studio album and the fifth album overall by Sara Groves.

== Songs ==
The album starts off with "When It Was Over", an unblinkingly honest look at love's perseverance in the face of hurtful situations. "You Are The Sun" brings more of Sara's poignant songwriting into play, with thoughts about how Jesus is the sun, we are the moon, and in order to reflect His light, we've got to turn our faces to Him. "It's Going To Be Alright" is written as Sara speaking to a friend about a difficult experience in their life. The acoustic piano and guitar sound continue with the title track, and starts to really hit on the theme of this record: the building of the kingdom of God. "Something Changed" richly conveys the experience of a transformation of the heart, and was used in the movie The Ultimate Gift as a closing theme to represent the new person whom its main character had become through a difficult process of growth and experience. "To The Moon" is a short (barely a minute and a half long) track bearing the central message of leaving this earth, getting away from all of its nonsense and taking the church to the moon. "Kingdom Comes", a highlight track, she walks through different ways that the body of Christ can reach out and be "a little stone... a little mortar" in building up the church. Second to last, "Loving A Person" touches on themes of simply loving people "just the way they are... it's no small thing." Closing the album out is "When It Was Over (Reprise)", which stays loyal to the soft feel of this entire record. Mixing together lines from the different tracks, Groves effectively reminds us of all that we have learned through this journey she takes us on on Add To The Beauty.

== Production ==
Though Sara's excelled as a go-it-alone songwriter for most of her recordings, this time around she collaborates in several instances with friends new and old. Joel Hanson (of PFR fame), Gordon Kennedy (Eric Clapton, Pierce Pettis), Matt Bronlewee (Jars of Clay) and the GMA's current “Producer of the Year” Ed Cash each weigh in. While Sara's thought-provoking lyrics remain the centerpiece of the songs she and her comrades paired on, and she composed most of the music in these instances, these four friends escort her into occasional new territory. A consistently pronounced sense of melody and more hook-driven choruses are the result. Thematically, the disc is pure Groves. The storyteller's songs are relational, personal, hopeful and, of course, poetic. In a subtle departure for Sara, there are no mentions of biblical personalities by name except for that of Jesus in any of the lyrics.

== Critical reception ==
Professional ratings
Review scores
Source	Rating
Allmusic	4/5 stars
CCM Magazine	A
Christian Broadcasting Network	3/5 spins
Christianity Today	4/5 stars
Cross Rhythms	10/10 squares
Jesus Freak Hideout	4.5/5 stars
New Release Tuesday	4.5/5 stars
The Phantom Tollbooth	4/5 stars
The Trades	B

Add to the Beauty garnered critical acclaim from music critics. At CCM Magazine, Jay Swartzendruber graded the album an A, calling the songs on the release "revealing and vulnerable" and noting how the lyricism is "more inclusive, open and universal." Rick Anderson of Allmusic rated the album four stars, writing that "if you just wish [Christian pop] were more consistently transcendent, then this album will give you cause for hope." At Christianity Today, Andree Farias rated the album four stars, proclaiming the album as yet "another winner" of hers. Founder Tony Cummings of Cross Rhythms rated the release a ten out of ten squares, affirming that it is "A gem" of an album on which Groves is "at the top of her game" in this unquestionable "very fine set" of songs. At Jesus Freak Hideout, Shaun Stevenson rated the album four-and-a-half stars, highlighting that this "is great for those looking for a soft sound and a definite thought-provoking conversation with Sara Groves." Brian A. Smith of The Phantom Tollbooth rated the album four-and-a-half tocks, affirming that this is "simply a wonderful album". At New Release Tuesday, Kevin Davis rated the album four-and-a-half stars, calling the album "excellent". The Trades' Paul Schultz graded the album a B, noting how "The title track anchors the consistently uplifting theme of the album". However, Christian Broadcasting Network's Jennifer E. Jones offered up a mixed review, rating the album three spins, stating that "There are less breakout tracks on this album like there were on Other Side of Something but it has a gentle consistency."

== Commercial performance ==
For the Billboard charting week of October 22, 2005, Add to the Beauty was the No. 42 most sold album in the Christian music market via the Christian Albums position.

For the Billboard charting week of October 29, 2005, the album was the No. 19 most sold album in the Christian music market via the Christian Albums chart placement. Also, it placed at the No. 28 position on the Heatseekers Album chart, which is the breaking-and-entry chart.

== Awards ==
The album was nominated for a Dove Award for Recorded Music Packaging of the Year at the 37th GMA Dove Awards.

== Track listing ==
Tracklist
No.	Title	Writer(s)	Length
1.	"When It Was Over"	Ed Cash, Sara Groves	5:44
2.	"Just Showed Up for My Own Life"	Groves, Joel Hanson	4:35
3.	"You Are the Sun"	Matt Bronleewe, Groves	5:15
4.	"It's Going to Be Alright"	Groves, Gordon Kennedy	5:37
5.	"Add to the Beauty"	Bronleewe, Groves	4:13
6.	"Rewrite This Tragedy"	Groves	5:10
7.	"Something Changed"	Groves	3:45
8.	"How Can I Tell?"	Groves	4:03
9.	"To the Moon"	Groves	1:27
10.	"Kingdom Comes"	Groves	4:58
11.	"Why It Matters"	Groves	3:49
12.	"Loving a Person"	Groves, Kennedy	3:51
13.	"When It Was Over (Reprise)"	Groves	6:25
Total length:			58:53

== Personnel ==
- Sara Groves – vocals, acoustic piano (9)
- Blair Masters – acoustic piano (1–3, 5, 7, 8), keyboards (2–6, 10), Rhodes electric piano (4), Hammond B3 organ (7, 10, 12), scitando harp (8)
- Shane Keister – acoustic piano (4, 6, 10–12)
- Scott Denté – acoustic guitars (1–8, 10)
- Jerry McPherson – electric guitars (1–3, 5–8)
- George Cocchini – electric guitars (2)
- Tom Bukovac – electric guitars (4, 10, 12)
- Paul Franklin – steel guitar (7, 10)
- Matt Pierson – bass (1–8, 10, 12)
- Steve Brewster – drums (1–8, 10, 12)
- Ken Lewis – percussion (2–8, 10)
- Bill Woodworth – English horn (1)
- John Catchings – cello (3, 11)
- Jason Lefan – scitando harp assistant (8)
- Stuart Duncan – fiddle (10)
- Nirva Dorsaint – backing vocals (2, 4, 8, 12)
- Michael Mellett – backing vocals (2, 4–6, 8, 12)
- Lisa Bevill – backing vocals (5)
- Debbie Patterson – backing vocals (6)
- Travis Cottrell – backing vocals (8, 12)

Choir on "To The Moon"

- Brown Bannister
- Steve Bishir
- Sara Groves
- Aaron Sternke

== Production ==
- Troy Groves – executive producer
- Jeff Moseley – A&R
- Brown Bannister – producer
- Steve Bishir – recording, mixing (1, 4, 6, 10–13)
- Todd Robbins – mixing (2, 3, 5, 7–9)
- Wayne Thomas – engineer (9)
- Jason Lefan – assistant engineer
- Dave Salley – assistant engineer
- Aaron Sternke – assistant engineer, digital editing
- Richard Dodd – mastering at Vital Recordings (Nashville, Tennessee)
- Dana Salsedo – creative director, stylist
- Wayne Brezinka – design, layout
- Kristin Barlowe – photography
- Found vintage art – illustrations
- Faith Miller – stylist
- Suzy Wigstadt – stylist
- Sheila Davis-Curtis – hair, make-up

== Charts ==
Chart (2005)	Peak position
US Christian Albums (Billboard)	19
US Heatseekers Albums (Billboard)	28
