= All That Jazz (Breathe album) =

- Original cover

Studio album by Breathe
- Released: 24 August 1987
- Length: 43:08
- Labels: A&M (US); Siren/Virgin (International); Cherry Pop (2013 UK Deluxe Edition)
- Producers: Bob Sargeant; Chris Porter; Paul Staveley O'Duffy

Breathe chronology
All That Jazz (1987)	Peace of Mind (1990)

Singles from All That Jazz
- 1. "Don't Tell Me Lies" Released: January 1986 (UK only); 2. "Jonah" Released: May 1987; 3. "All That Jazz" Released: 31 August 1987 (UK only); 4. "Hands to Heaven" Released: 20 October 1987 (UK); 5. "Any Trick" Released: 28 March 1988 (UK only); 6. "How Can I Fall?" Released: August 1988 (US); 7. "Jonah" Released: October 1988 (UK reissue); 8. "Don't Tell Me Lies" Released: 3 January 1989 (US) & March 1989 (UK reissue); 9. "All This I Should Have Known" Released: Apr 1989 (US only)

Alternative Cover 1
- Reissue and Deluxe Edition front cover

Alternative Cover 2
- Canadian front cover

All That Jazz is the debut studio album by English pop band Breathe. Originally scheduled for release in October 1987, the album was issued first in the United States on 24 August 1987, ahead of the United Kingdom and other markets. The album peaked at No. 22 on the UK Albums Chart and at No. 34 on the US Billboard 200. It has been certified Gold in the US by the RIAA, Gold in Canada and Silver in the UK by the BPI.

A number of the album's tracks were recorded in 1985 with producer Bob Sargeant. The group's first British single, "Don't Tell Me Lies", was released in January 1986 and reached No. 77 on the UK singles chart. In 1987, Chris Porter was brought on board to produce, and the band continued working on the rest of the tracks to be included on All That Jazz. "Don't Tell Me Lies" was not featured on the initial UK release of the album (though an edited dance version was included on the US version and later album pressings worldwide). In May 1987, "Jonah" became the band's first US single, and third in the UK, but failed to chart in either territory.

The biggest hit single from the album was "Hands to Heaven", which reached No. 4 in the UK singles chart and No. 2 on the US Billboard Hot 100. Other singles from the album include three UK-only tracks—"All That Jazz", "Any Trick", and a remix of "Jonah"—along with "How Can I Fall?", a remix of "Don't Tell Me Lies, and "All This I Should Have Known" (US only).

On 25 February 2013, a Deluxe Edition of the album was issued by Cherry Pop Records.

== Critical reception ==
Professional ratings
Review scores
Source	Rating
AllMusic	3/5 stars
The Rolling Stone Album Guide	1.5/5 stars

In a review of All That Jazz for AllMusic, William Cooper wrote that it "rarely strays from the lushly produced elevator music" of the singles "Hands to Heaven" and "How Can I Fall?", describing the album as "a pleasant enough listen for fans of harmless, romantic pop", though the band "falters considerably with the more up-tempo material." He went on to opine that the album "is only sporadically entertaining".

== Commercial performance ==
In the US, All That Jazz spent 51 weeks in the Billboard 200, from June 4, 1988, with a peak at No. 34 on 24 December 1988. In the UK, the album debuted at its peak position of No. 22 on 8 October 1988, dropping from the chart 5 weeks later. Spending 5 weeks also on the Swedish albums chart from 11 January 1989, All That Jazz reached No. 12 on 8 February 1989. In Canada, the album spent 26 weeks on the RPM 100 albums chart, achieving its highest position of No. 43 on 26 November 1988. In Germany, it peaked at No. 50 for two weeks from 20 February 1989.

The album was certified Gold in the United States on 21 November 1988, Silver in the United Kingdom on 14 April 1989, and Gold in Canada on 21 April 1989.

== Track listings ==
All tracks written by David Glasper and Marcus Lillington, except where noted.

UK release – original release
No.	Title	Writer(s)	Length
1.	"Jonah"		4:49
2.	"All That Jazz"		4:09
3.	"Monday Morning Blues"		3:57
4.	"Hands to Heaven"		4:17
5.	"All This I Should Have Known"		3:47
6.	"Any Trick"		4:01
7.	"Liberties of Love"	Glasper; Danny Schogger	3:30
8.	"Won't You Come Back?"		5:57
9.	"For Love or Money"		3:59
10.	"How Can I Fall?"		4:42
Total length:			43:08

In the United States, A&M Records substituted track 9 "For Love or Money" with a special edit of the extended dance mix of "Don't Tell Me Lies", remixed by John Morales.

US release
No.	Title	Writer(s)	Length
1.	"Jonah"		4:49
2.	"All That Jazz"		4:09
3.	"Monday Morning Blues"		3:57
4.	"Hands to Heaven"		4:17
5.	"All This I Should Have Known"		3:47
6.	"Any Trick"		4:01
7.	"Liberties of Love"	Glasper; Schogger	3:30
8.	"Won't You Come Back?"		5:57
9.	"Don't Tell Me Lies"		3:40
10.	"How Can I Fall?"		4:42
Total length:			42:49

When Siren Records re-released All That Jazz on 26 September 1988, the US edit of "Don't Tell Me Lies" was added to the album as track 6. A new cover design replaced the original, which had included since-departed fourth band member Michael Delahunty. The UK and European cassette version of the re-released album added "In All Honesty" as track B6. After initial American pressings sold out, A&M started using the new UK cover design, but maintained the original US track listing. Virgin Canada favoured the expanded UK track listing and packaged the album in a new cover that featured a seductively entwined couple caught mid-tango. For a brief period, this cover also appeared on some European and South American pressings.

UK re-release
No.	Title	Writer(s)	Length
1.	"Jonah"		3:38
2.	"All That Jazz"		4:09
3.	"Monday Morning Blues"		3:57
4.	"Hands to Heaven"		4:17
5.	"All This I Should Have Known"		3:47
6.	"Don't Tell Me Lies"		3:40
7.	"Any Trick"		4:01
8.	"Liberties of Love"	Glasper; Schogger	3:30
9.	"Won't You Come Back?"		5:57
10.	"For Love or Money"		3:59
11.	"How Can I Fall?"		4:42
Total length:			46:48

The 2-CD Deluxe Edition, released in 2013, builds upon the UK re-release. On disc 1, tracks 1 to 11 are retained in their original configuration, with an extra 8 tracks following. Disc 2 features an additional 14 tracks consisting of 5 non-album B-sides, and 9 remixes. Of the 33 tracks, 15 had not previously been available on CD (*).

Deluxe Edition (Disc 1) additional tracks
No.	Title	Length
12.	"Don't Tell Me Lies (1986 UK 7" Version)" (*)	3:42
13.	"In All Honesty (7" Version)" (*)	3:38
14.	"Jonah (1987 7" Version)" (*)	3:57
15.	"All That Jazz (Radio Mix)" (*)	4:10
16.	"Any Trick (Like A Monkey Radio Mix)" (*)	3:50
17.	"Jonah (1988 7" Version)"	3:38
18.	"How Can I Fall? (Single Version)"	4:02
19.	"Don't Tell Me Lies (1989 US 7" Version)" (*)	3:41
Total length:		77:26

Deluxe Edition (Disc 2)
No.	Title	Length
1.	"Moments" (*)	3:47
2.	"Take a Little Time"	4:10
3.	"Stay"	3:53
4.	"Life and Times"	4:46
5.	"Make It Funky" (*)	3:49
6.	"Don't Tell Me Lies (Dance Mix)" (*)	6:49
7.	"In All Honesty (Chilled Out Mix)" (*)	5:51
8.	"Jonah (A Whale Of A Mix)" (*)	7:42
9.	"All That Jazz (Remix)" (*)	6:14
10.	"Hands to Heaven (Extended Heaven)" (*)	6:25
11.	"Any Trick (Like A Monkey Club Mix)" (*)	9:14
12.	"How Can I Fall? (Extended Remix)"	6:03
13.	"Don't Tell Me Lies (Extended Version)"	5:40
14.	"In All Honesty (US Remix)"	3:52
Total length:		78:15

== Personnel ==
Band

- David Glasper – vocals
- Marcus Lillington – guitars, keyboards
- Michael Delahunty – bass
- Ian "Spike" Spice – drums, percussion

Production

- Produced by Paul Staveley O'Duffy, Chris Porter, and Bob Sargeant
- Engineers: John Gallen, John Madden, Chris Porter
- Mixing: Michael Brauer, Chris Porter
- Remix: Bob Kraushaar
- Mastering: Tim Young
- Mastering (Deluxe Edition): Alan Wilson

== Charts ==
Chart performance for All That Jazz
Chart (1988–89)	Peak position
Canadian Albums (RPM 100 Albums)	43
German Albums (Offizielle Top 100)	50
Swedish Albums Chart	12
UK Albums Chart (OCC)	22
US Billboard 200	34

== Certifications ==
Region	Certification	Certified units/sales
Canada (Music Canada)	Gold	50,000^{^}
United Kingdom (BPI)	Silver	60,000^{^}
United States (RIAA)	Gold	500,000^{^}
^{^} Shipments figures based on certification alone.

== Singles ==
All That Jazz generated nine singles, including two re-releases. Four of these issues were made in both the US and the UK, with another exclusive to the US and four not released in the US.

Year	Month	Single	Peak chart positions									B-Side
Year	Month	Single	UK	AUS	CAN	GER	NOR	NZ	SWE	US	US AC	B-Side
1986	Jan	"Don't Tell Me Lies" (original release)	77	x	x	x	x	x	x	x	x	"Moments"
1987	May	"Jonah" (original release)	—	—	—	—	—	—	—	—	—	"In All Honesty"
1987	Aug	"All That Jazz"	—	—	—	—	—	—	—	x	x	"Stay"
1987	Oct	"Hands to Heaven"	4	95	5	29	4	10	14	2	2	"Life and Times"
1988	Mar	"Any Trick"	—	x	x	x	x	x	x	x	x	"Make It Funky"
1988	Aug	"How Can I Fall?"	48	—	2	—	—	—	—	3	1	"Monday Morning Blues" (US) "All This I Should Have Known" (UK)
1988	Oct	"Jonah" (re-release)	60	—	x	—	—	—	—	x	x	"Liberties Of Love"
1989	Jan	"Don't Tell Me Lies" (re-release)	45	—	10	—	—	—	—	10	5	"Liberties Of Love" (US) "Monday Morning Blues" (UK)
1989	Apr	"All This I Should Have Known"	x	x	x	x	x	x	x	—	34	"In All Honesty"
"—" denotes releases that did not chart, "x" denotes releases not released in that country

Three singles failed to chart in any territory, while the final single "All This I Should Have Known", released only in the US, reached No. 34 on the Billboard Adult Contemporary chart.
