= Does She Love That Man =

1990 single by Breathe

"Does She Love That Man?"
- UK cover

Single by Breathe

from the album Peace of Mind
- B-side: "Where Angels Fear" (UK) "Say It" (US)
- Released: November 1990
- Recorded: 1990
- Studio: Abbey Road Studios; Rooster Studios (London)
- Genre: Pop; adult contemporary
- Length: 3:59
- Label: Siren Records; A&M; Virgin
- Songwriters: David Glasper; Marcus Lillington
- Producers: Bob Sargeant; Breathe

Breathe singles chronology
"Say Hello" (1990)	"Does She Love That Man?" (1990)

Alternative cover
- US cassette single cover

Audio sample
- "Does She Love That Man?": file; help

"Does She Love That Man?" is a song by the British band Breathe from their second and final album, Peace of Mind (1990). The song was issued in November 1990 as Breathe’s third single from the album, and thirteenth overall. It was also the band's final single, and hit.

In the United States, the artist was billed as ‘Breathe featuring David Glasper’.

"Does She Love That Man?" peaked at #34 on the US Billboard Hot 100 chart and at #17 on the Billboard Adult Contemporary chart in mid-January 1991. In Canada, the song reached #19 for two weeks the following month. The single did not reach the Top 100 singles chart in the United Kingdom.

== Track listings ==
UK 7” single (SIREN SRN134)

A. "Does She Love That Man?" [Radio Edit] - 3:59

B. "Where Angels Fear" - 4:50

US cassette single (A&M 75021 1535 4)

A. "Does She Love That Man?" [Album Version] - 4:46

B. "Say It" - 3:38

UK CD single (SIREN SRNCD 134)

1. "Does She Love That Man?" [Radio Edit] - 3:59
2. "Does She Love That Man?" [Album Version] - 4:46
3. "Where Angels Fear" - 4:50
4. "All This I Should Have Known" [U.S. Remix] - 3:57

All songs written by David Glasper and Marcus Lillington. Published by BMG VM Music Limited.

== Music video ==
The music video for “Does She Love That Man?” was produced in 1990 and directed by Jesse Dylan.

== Personnel ==
=== Band ===
- David Glasper (vocals)
- Marcus Lillington (guitar, keyboards, programming)
- Ian Spice (drums)

=== Production ===
- Engineer: John Gallen
- Mastered by Ian Cooper
- Mixed by Julian Mendelsohn
- A&R: Simon Hicks
- Art Direction, Design: John Warwicker, Vivid I.D.
- Management: Jonny Too Bad, Paul King
- Photography: Martin Brading

== Charts ==
Chart (1990–1991)	Peak position
Canada Top Singles (RPM)	19
UK Airplay (Music Week)	41
US Billboard Hot 100	34
US Adult Contemporary (Billboard)	17
US Cash Box Top 100	33
