= Gravity (Out of the Grey album) =

Studio album by Out of the Grey
- Released: August 1, 1995
- Studio: CP Productions, Sixteenth Avenue Sound and Battery Studios (Nashville, Tennessee); The Hit Factory (New York City, New York)
- Genre: Contemporary Christian music
- Length: 39:10
- Label: Sparrow
- Producer: Charlie Peacock

Out of the Grey chronology
Diamond Days (1994)	Gravity (1995)	(See Inside) (1997)

Professional ratings
Review scores
Source	Rating
AllMusic	4/5 stars

Gravity is the fourth album by Out of the Grey, released on August 1, 1995. It saw the second album that brought the band into an Adult Contemporary vein, which appealed to contemporary Christian music radio formats with several singles.

== Track listing ==
All songs written by Christine and Scott Denté, except where noted.

1. "Stay Close" – 3:46
2. "When Love Comes to Life" (Christine Denté, Scott Denté, Charlie Peacock) – 4:12
3. "Hope in Sight" (Christine Denté, Scott Denté, Charlie Peacock) – 3:56
4. "So We Never Got to Paris" – 3:59
5. "The Weight of the Words" (Christine Denté, Scott Denté, Charlie Peacock) – 4:20
6. "Gravity" – 4:10
7. "Pretending" – 3:03
8. "I Can Wait" (Christine Denté) – 3:30
9. "Bird on a Wire" – 4:25
10. "Dreaming of April" (Christine Denté) – 3:43

== Personnel ==
Out of the Grey

- Christine Denté – vocals, backing vocals
- Scott Denté – vocals, backing vocals, acoustic guitars, electric guitars (6)

Musicians

- Blair Masters – keyboards (1, 2, 5)
- Tim Lauer – keyboards (1, 4), accordion (4), harmonium (4)
- Charlie Peacock – keyboards (2, 4–6, 8)
- Pat Coil – keyboards (7, 9, 10)
- Gordon Kennedy – electric guitars (1–5, 7–10)
- Jerry McPherson – electric guitars (6)
- Jimmie Lee Sloas – bass (1–3, 5, 8)
- Paul Socolow – bass (4, 6, 7, 9, 10)
- Todd Turkisher – drums (1, 3, 4, 6–10)
- Steve Brewster – drums (2, 5)
- Eric Darken – tambourine (1), percussion (2, 4, 5)
- Rick Stone – tambourine (3)
- Samba – chimes (8)
- Molly Felder – backing vocals (1)
- Nicol Smith – backing vocals (2)

== Production ==
- Peter York – executive producer
- Charlie Peacock – producer
- Elliot Scheiner – tracking engineer (1, 3, 4, 6–10), mixing (1, 2, 4, 5)
- Shane D. Wilson – overdub engineer, tracking engineer (2, 5), mix assistant (7, 8, 10)
- Jeff Pitzer – additional assistance
- Richard Rose – additional assistance
- Rick Will – mixing (3, 6, 9)
- Tom Laune – mixing (7, 8, 10)
- Glen Marchese – mix assistant (1, 2, 4, 5)
- Pete Martinez – mix assistant (3, 6, 9)
- Ken Love – mastering at MasterMix (Nashville, Tennessee)
- Andi Ashworth – budget administration
- Karen Philpott – art direction, design
- Andrew Eccles – photography
- Kyni Cantor – stylist
- Helena Ochipinti – hair, make-up
- Proper Management – management
