= How Can I Fall? =

Single by Breathe

from the album All That Jazz
- B-side: "All This I Should Have Known", "Monday Morning Blues" (US)
- Released: November 1988
- Recorded: 1985–87; CBS Studios (London)
- Genre: Soft rock
- Length: 4:42 (album version); 4:08 (US edit); 3:59 (single version)
- Label: Siren; Virgin; A&M (US)
- Songwriters: David Glasper; Marcus Lillington
- Producer: Bob Sargeant

Breathe singles chronology
"Hands to Heaven" (1987)	"How Can I Fall?" (1988)	""Don't Tell Me Lies (reissue)" (1989)

"How Can I Fall?" is a song by British band Breathe, written by the group members David Glasper and Marcus Lillington. It was released in June 1988 as the second single from their debut studio album, All That Jazz (1987). In the United Kingdom, "How Can I Fall?" was the third single from the album, following "Hands to Heaven" and the UK-only release "Jonah".

The song was successful in the United States where it peaked at #3 on the Billboard Hot 100 and #1 on the Billboard Adult Contemporary chart. Internationally, "How Can I Fall" reached the top 40 in the Belgium and Netherlands; however, in the United Kingdom it peaked solely at #48.

== Charts ==
=== Weekly charts ===
Chart (1988–1989)	Peak position
Belgium (Ultratip Bubbling Under Flanders)	23
Canada Top Singles (RPM)	2
Netherlands (Dutch Top 40)	23
Netherlands (Single Top 100)	29
UK Singles (Official Charts)	48
US Adult Contemporary (Billboard)	1
US Billboard Hot 100	3
US Cash Box Top Singles	2

=== Year-end charts ===
Chart (1988)	Position
Canada Top Singles (RPM)	36
Chart (1989)	Position
US Adult Contemporary (Billboard)	49
US Billboard Hot 100	27
