= A Little Light Left =

Studio album by Out of the Grey
- Released: December 4, 2015
- Studio: The Attic and Snoring Dog Studios (Nashville, Tennessee)
- Genre: CCM
- Length: 41:15
- Label: Independent
- Producer: Out of the Grey; Julian Denté; Ken Lewis

Out of the Grey chronology
6.1 (2001)	A Little Light Left (2015)

Professional ratings
Review scores
Source	Rating
CrossRhythms	5/5 stars

A Little Light Left is the seventh studio album by Out of the Grey, released on December 4, 2015. The album was their first since 2001.

Instead of working with a formal label, Scott and Christine Denté decided to produce A Little Light Left as an independent effort. They launched a Kickstarter campaign, "$35K in 35 Days," to fund the project. The campaign was successful beyond its target, and they began work on the album.

== Track listing ==
All songs written by Out of the Grey, except where noted.

1. "We're Still Here" – 5:13
2. "Giving Up Slow" (Out of the Grey, Julian Denté) – 4:09
3. "Bubble Girl" – 2:58
4. "The Distance" – 3:55
5. "Speak" (Out of the Grey, Julian Denté) – 3:48
6. "Only Love Remains" (Out of the Grey, Julian Denté) – 3:19
7. "Dropped Off" – 3:34
8. "Two to Wonder (Instrumental)" – 1:13
9. "Hard to Die" – 3:45
10. "A Little Light Left" – 5:49
11. "Travel Well" – 3:28

== Notes ==
- "Speak" and "Dropped Off" are the first Out of the Grey songs since "That's Where I Live" (from (See Inside)) to feature exclusively Scott Denté's lead vocals.

== Personnel ==
Out of the Grey

- Christine Denté – vocals, backing vocals
- Scott Denté – vocals, backing vocals, guitars (1, 3, 4, 7–11), additional guitars (2, 5, 6)

Musicians

- Blair Masters – keyboards (1, 3, 4, 7–11)
- Julian Denté – all instruments (2, 5, 6)
- Matt Stanfield – keyboards (4, 7–10), programming (4)
- David Cleveland – guitars (1, 3, 11)
- Jerry McPherson – guitars (4, 7–10)
- Smith Curry – lap steel guitar (1, 3, 11), pedal steel guitar (1, 3, 11), dobro (4, 7–10)
- Matt Pierson – bass (1, 3, 4, 7–11)
- Ken Lewis – drums (1, 3, 4, 7–11)
- David Angell – strings (1, 3, 11)
- Monisa Angell – strings (1, 3, 11)
- David Davidson – strings (1, 3, 11)
- Carole Rabinowitz – strings (1, 3, 11)
- Ben Shive – string arrangements (1, 3, 11)
- Matt Nelson – cello (4, 7–10)

=== Production ===
- Scott Denté – executive producer
- Mary Doherty – executive producer
- Out of the Grey – producers, liner notes
- Ken Lewis – producer (1, 3, 11)
- Julian Denté – producer (2, 5, 6)
- Monroe Jones – additional vocal production (7)
- Billy Whittington – recording
- Richie Biggs – mixing
- Richard Dodd – mastering
- Clark Hook – design
- Abi Lewis – photography
