= 6.1 (album) =

Studio album by Out of the Grey
- Released: August 15, 2001
- Studio: The Bennett House, Dark Horse Recording and Screaming Baby (Franklin, Tennessee); Rack N Roll (Nashville, Tennessee)
- Genre: CCM
- Length: 42:42
- Label: Rocketown
- Producer: Monroe Jones

Out of the Grey chronology
(See Inside) (1997)	6.1 (2001)	A Little Light Left (2015)

Professional ratings
Review scores
Source	Rating
AllMusic	4.5/5 stars

6.1 is the sixth studio album by Out of the Grey, released on August 15, 2001. It was their first (and only) on Rocketown Records, after leaving Sparrow.

The duo saw the new album as an opportunity to redefine themselves as a band, and this hope is reflected in the album's name, 6.1. In an interview, the Dentés said "This time around, we were told to forget about the mentality of trying to write a certain way. It's been a long time since we've been able to let go and feel the freedom to do what we like and be what we want to be."

Although the album gained favorable reviews, it would be their last as a band until 2015.

== Track listing ==
All songs written by Christine and Scott Denté, except where noted.

1. "Shine Like Crazy" – 4:31
2. "Truth Breaks Through" (Monroe Jones) – 3:53
3. "Brave" – 3:07
4. "What's It Gonna Be" – 3:08
5. "With All My Heart" – 3:06
6. "Waiting" – 3:07
7. "Tell Your Story" – 3:33
8. "Out of the Ordinary" (Chris Donohue, Ken Lewis) – 3:54
9. "The Words" – 2:57
10. "I Want Everything" – 3:56
11. "Grace, Mercy and Peace" – 7:28

== Personnel ==
Out of the Grey

- Christine Denté – vocals
- Scott Denté – guitars, vocals

Additional personnel

- Jeff Roach – keyboards, drums
- Gary Burnette – guitars
- Mark Hill – bass
- Greg Herrington – drums
- Dan Needham – drums
- Ken Lewis – percussion

Production

- Don Donahue – executive producer
- Monroe Jones – producer
- Jim Dineen – engineer
- David Streit – assistant engineer
- Tom Laune – mixing at Bridgeway Studios (Nashville, Tennessee)
- Hank Williams – mastering at MasterMix (Nashville, Tennessee)
- Jamie Kiner – production coordinator
- Jimmy Abegg – image coordinator, photography
- Karrine Caulkins – art direction
- Linda Bourdeaux – design
- Fleming McWilliams – stylist
- Robin Geary – hair stylist, make-up

== Notes ==
- According to the liner notes, the album was dedicated to Vincent Denté (1937-1999).
- An instrumental interlude appears at the end of "With All My Heart", starting at 2:43. This is a shorter version of the hidden track at the end of "With All My Heart".
