= Sara Groves =

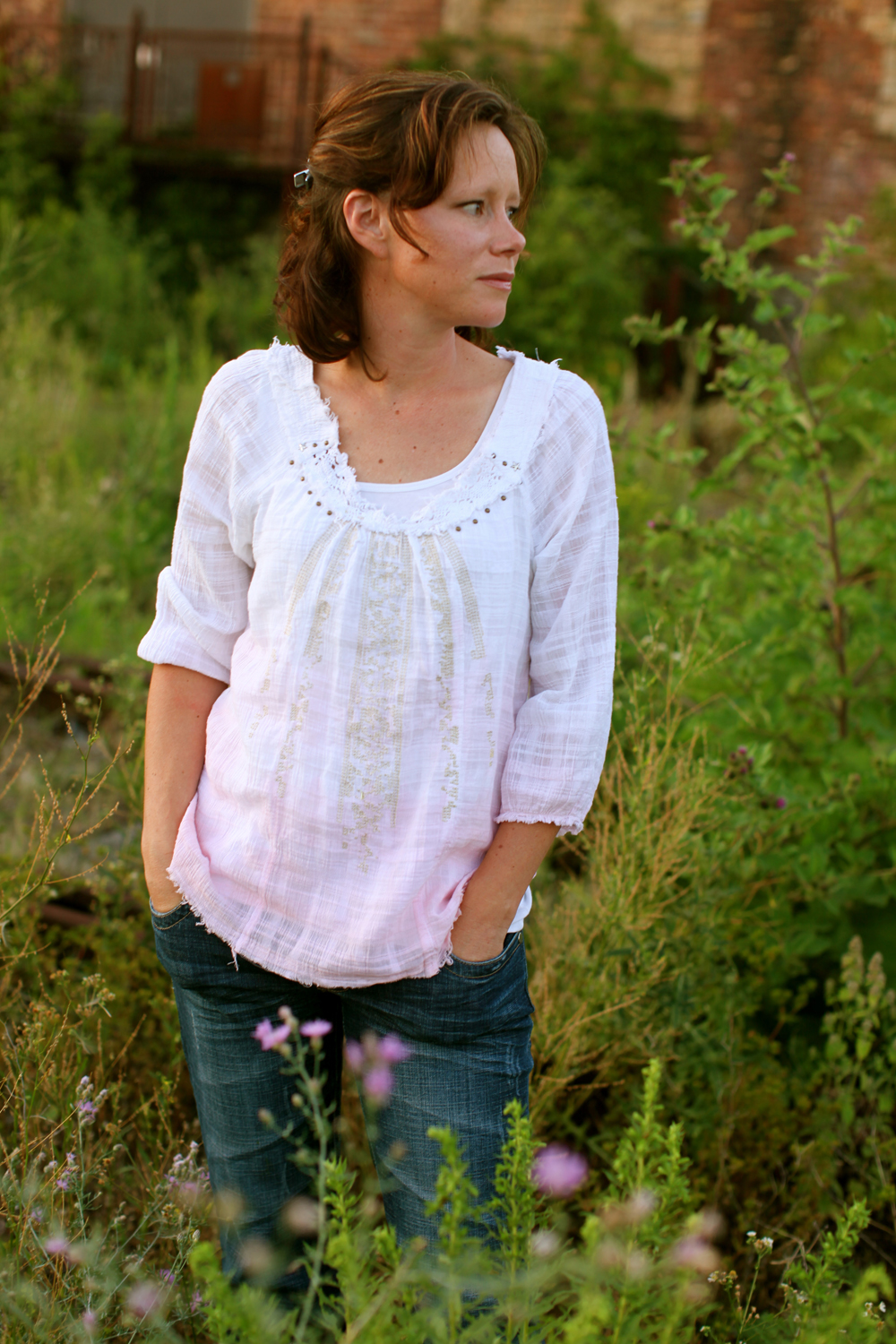
- Sara Groves, Fireflies and Songs

Background information
- Born: September 10, 1972 (age 54)
- Origin: Burnsville, Minnesota, US
- Genre: Contemporary Christian music
- Instruments: Vocals, piano, guitar
- Years active: 1998–present
- Label: INO
- Website: www.saragroves.com

Sara Groves (born Nancy Lee Colbaugh; September 10, 1972) is an American contemporary Christian singer, record producer, and author.

Groves received her Bachelor of Science degree in history and English in 1994 from Evangel University, a private Christian university in Springfield, Missouri. Groves spent four years teaching high school in Rosemount, Minnesota before recording her first album, Past the Wishing, in 1998. Since then, she has released nine additional albums and appeared on several others. Groves has been nominated for three Dove Awards, including New Artist of the Year in 2002 and Special Event Album of the Year 2003 by the Gospel Music Association. She was named one of the best Christian music artists of 2005 and the album, Add to the Beauty, was named Album of the Year for 2005 by CCM Magazine.

== Career ==
Groves started writing songs when she was four years old. She describes her youth as being "lonesome", and she wrote about deep issues while still in junior high school. Eventually, she took a songwriting course, prompted by her husband, and she began to take the art seriously.

In 2001, she appeared on Word Entertainment's What a Mom album with the song "Generations", and also on Word Entertainment's New Music from Our Heart To Yours album.

In 2002, she performed with Randy Stonehill on the song "Take Me Back", performed with Joel Hanson on the title song for the album Traveling Light: Songs From the 23rd Psalm, and performed the song "Child of Love" for the album City on a Hill: It's Christmas Time.

In 2003, she appeared on the City on a Hill: The Gathering album with the song "Come Be Who You Are", and the following year's sequel City on a Hill: The Collection album, with the song "Jesus Went to the Garden".

Groves was recognized by the Alumni Board from Evangel University in 2004, for her significant achievements in the years since graduation.

In September 2005, Groves, her husband Troy, her father-in-law, a neighbor, and a Minneapolis ER doctor delivered a tour bus and trailer load of baby supplies to victims of Hurricane Katrina in Slidell, Louisiana.

In August 2006, Groves released a film titled Nomad Film: Sara Groves – Just Showed Up for My Own Life, the first installment of a film series called Nomad: The Show With No Home produced by Fearless Films Inc. The video presents a collection of videos about Sara's musical career, some of her inspirations in life, and her charitable engagement. Notably, was deeply moved after reading Philip Gourevitch's We Wish to Inform You That Tomorrow We Will Be Killed With Our Families, so she took a trip to Rwanda, Africa, with Pastor Rick Warren and a Christian group from Saddleback Church to learn about the challenges of reconciliation and economic development 11 years after the mass Rwandan genocide. She also engaged in the Katrina relief effort in 2005 and expressed how Gary Haugen's work has deeply influenced her. Bonus features included Grove's performance of Add To The Beauty from the 2006 Jars of Clay Tour, Nomad vignettes for small group, etc.

On October 30, 2007, the first single from the upcoming album Tell Me What You Know, titled "When the Saints", was featured as a free download from Apple's iTunes Store. INO Records released the album Tell Me What You Know on November 6, 2007. Tell Me What You Know held the No. 1 sales spot for Christian music on iTunes for one week and landed at No. 2 for iTunes album of the year. Groves produced her father's, Dwight Colbaugh, first album titled Beautiful Story. Groves ended 2007 in the lineup with Andrew Peterson on his Behold the Lamb of God Tour in November and December 2007.

In 2008, Groves toured throughout the year to promote her new album Tell Me What You Know and to benefit several Christian ministries. Groves and her husband teamed up with Charlie Peacock, Derek Webb, Sandra McCracken and Brandon Heath in September and October 2008 for the Art*Music*Justice Tour to benefit both the International Justice Mission and Food For the Hungry. Groves released her first Christmas album, O Holy Night, in October 2008. The album contains both Christmas standards and newly written material. Groves was in the lineup in December 2008 of the Love Came Down Tour: A Christmas Pageant with Jars of Clay, Sixpence None the Richer and Leeland. She ended 2008 with a free concert at the United States Medical Center for Federal Prisoners in Springfield, Missouri. The USMCFP is the same prison that Sara's grandparents, Lloyd and Nita Colbaugh, have visited for 39 years and to which they took her as a baby at Christmas-time 1972. Groves said later about this concert, "More than anything I wanted to say something of encouragement, something to remind these men that they are the art of God, especially in this place. Like always, I left encouraged myself."

Groves' ninth album, Fireflies & Songs, was released on November 17, 2009. On the track "From This One Place," Groves sings about her battles with onstage anxiety attacks. The album, Fireflies and Songs, was named Album of the Year by Christianity Today as the "runaway" No. 1 choice by a panel of ten music critics choosing Christianity Today's Top 12 Albums of 2009. Groves ended 2009 with her first solo Christmas tour performing songs from her 2008 Holiday release O Holy Night.

Groves released her tenth album Invisible Empires on October 18, 2011. Groves produced several live music videos in support of the album, including a video with Stephen Mason of Jars of Clay for the song "Eyes on the Prize".

In 2012 Groves and her husband launched "Art House North". In describing the space, the Groves write: "The heart of Art House is to provide 'resources that communicate the worth and necessity of all vocations with access to speakers, teachers, and guest artists. All Art House programs promote community, life, and world engagement, helping people become more and more interested in the same things that Jesus is interested in.'"

== Discography ==
=== Albums ===
Album	Details	Peak chart positions			
Album	Details	US	US Christ.	US Heat	US Holiday
Past the Wishing	Release date: February 1, 1998	—	—	—	—
Conversations	Release date: September 18, 2001; Label: INO Records	—	35	—	—
All Right Here	Release date: August 20, 2002	—	16	18	—
The Other Side of Something	Release date: March 23, 2004	—	29	32	—
Station Wagon: Songs for New Parents	Release date: February 25, 2005	—	—	—	—
Add to the Beauty	Release date: October 4, 2005	—	19	28	—
Tell Me What You Know	Release date: November 6, 2007	72	1	2	—
O Holy Night	Release date: October 14, 2008	175	10	—	47
Fireflies and Songs	Release date: November 17, 2009	119	5	—	—
O Holy Night Tour - Live: The Prison Show	Release date: November 9, 2010	—	—	—	—
Invisible Empires	Release date: October 18, 2011	96	6	—	—
The Collection	Release date: September 17, 2013	—	—	—	—
Floodplain	Release date: November 6, 2015	—	8	—	—
Abide With Me	Release date: November 17, 2017	—	8	—	—
Joy of Every Longing Heart	Release date: November 1, 2019	—	—	—	—
What Makes It Through	Release date: November 12, 2021	—	—	—	—

== Publications ==
- Essay in The Art of Being, 2004 original essays and stories from a diverse list of contributors (compiled and edited by Constance Rhodes)
