= All Right Here =

Studio album by Sara Groves
- Released: August 20, 2002
- Studio: Dark Horse Recording (Franklin, Tennessee)
- Genre: Contemporary Christian music, acoustic, folk
- Length: 56:57
- Label: INO
- Producer: Nate Sabin

Sara Groves chronology
Conversations (2001)	All Right Here (2002)	The Other Side of Something (2004)

All Right Here is the second studio album and third album overall from Christian singer and songwriter Sara Groves, and was released on August 20, 2002, by INO Records. The producer on the album is Nate Sabin. This release became critically acclaimed and commercially successful.

== Critical reception ==
Professional ratings
Review scores
Source	Rating
Allmusic	3/5 stars
CCM Magazine	A
Christianity Today	5/5 stars
Cross Rhythms	9/10 squares
Jesus Freak Hideout	3.5/5 stars
New Release Tuesday	5/5 stars
The Phantom Tollbooth	4/5 stars

All Right Here garnered critical acclaim from music critics. At Christianity Today, Russ Breimeier rated the album five stars, stating she "score[s] a home run with most every track". Mike Rimmer of Cross Rhythms rated the album nine out of ten squares, writing that the release "finds her hitting her stride." At CCM Magazine, Lizza Connor graded the album an A, highlighting that she is "still hitting repeat." Founder John DiBiase of Jesus Freak Hideout rated the album three-and-a-half stars, calling it a "strong step" that is "still a worthy acoustic pop recording and a great sophomore record for Groves." At The Phantom Tollbooth, Brian A. Smith rated the album four tocks, proclaiming it to be "an amazing work" that "will appeal to both the adult contemporary crowd, as well as the folk lovers, but also to people who just appreciate a well conceived, thoughtful album without frills." At New Release Tuesday, Kevin Davis rated the album five stars, affirming that he "highly recommend" because "She has an amazing singing voice and is easily the best female Christian songwriter." However, Ashleigh Kittle of Allmusic rated it three stars, stating that "It provides listeners with a further glimpse into the heart of Groves, offering 13 new acoustic folk-pop and at time country-flavored songs focusing on a variety of relationships."

== Commercial performance ==
For the Billboard charting week of September 7, 2002, All Right Here was the No. 16 most sold album in the Christian music market via the Christian Albums position. Also, it placed at No. 18 on the breaking-and-entry chart the Heatseekers Albums.

== Track listing ==
All tracks are written by Sara Groves, unless otherwise noted.

Tracklist
No.	Title	Writer(s)	Length
1.	"Less Like Scars"	Sara Groves, Nate Sabin	4:20
2.	"Every Minute"		4:59
3.	"Fly"		4:23
4.	"You Did That for Me"	Jonell Mosser, Pierce Pettis	4:12
5.	"Just One More Thing"		3:35
6.	"All Right Here"	Groves, Sabin	4:18
7.	"Remember Surrender"		4:15
8.	"Maybe There's a Loving God"	Groves, Sabin	5:12
9.	"This Peace"		3:58
10.	"Tornado"		5:17
11.	"First Song That I Sing"		4:51
12.	"You Cannot Lose My Love"		2:35
13.	"Jesus, You're Beautiful"	Sabin	5:02
Total length:			56:57

== Personnel ==
Musicians

- Sara Groves – vocals, handclaps (11), acoustic piano (12)
- Jeffrey Roach – acoustic piano (1–3, 5, 7–10, 13), organ (1, 4, 6), keyboards (3, 5, 11, 13)
- Gary Burnette – electric guitar (1, 6, 11)
- David Cleveland – acoustic guitar (1–5, 9–11, 13), electric guitar (6), bouzouki (8)
- Phil Madeira – slide guitar (4), baritone guitar (10)
- Nate Sabin – acoustic guitar (6), flute (8), handclaps (11)
- Matt Pierson – bass (1–8, 11, 13), upright bass (9, 10)
- Steve Brewster – drums (1–8, 10, 11, 13), percussion (2–11, 13)
- Marc Anderson – percussion (5, 8, 11)
- John Catchings – strings (3, 7, 8, 12)
- Dave Jensen – trumpet (5)
- Peter Ostroushko – fiddle (10)

Background vocalists

- Sara Groves – backing vocals (1, 4–6, 8, 11, 13)
- Michael Olson – backing vocals (1, 11)
- Lori Sabin – backing vocals (1–5, 7, 11, 13)
- Nate Sabin – backing vocals (1, 4, 5, 7, 11, 13)
- Ashleigh Friend – backing vocals (2, 11)
- Matt Patrick – backing vocals (10)

=== Production ===
- Troy Groves – executive producer
- Nate Sabin – producer
- Todd Robbins – recording, mixing
- Hank Williams – mastering at MasterMix (Nashville, Tennessee)
- Wayne Brezinka – art direction
- Dana Salcedo – art direction
- Sara Groves – illustrations
- Kristin Barlowe – photography
- Sheila Davis – hair, make-up
- Kellen Whiteman – stylist

== Charts ==
Chart (2004)	Peak position
US Top Christian Albums (Billboard)	16
US Heatseekers Albums (Billboard)	18
