= Jonah (Breathe song) =

1987 single by Breathe

- 1987 U.K. front cover

Single by Breathe

from the album All That Jazz
- B-side: "In All Honesty"
- Released: May 1987
- Recorded: 1987
- Genre: Pop
- Length: 3:54
- Label: Siren Records; A&M
- Songwriters: David Glasper, Marcus Lillington
- Producer: Chris Porter

Breathe singles chronology
"In All Honesty" (1986)	"Jonah" (1987)	"All That Jazz" (1987)

Alternative cover
- 1987 U.S. front cover

"Jonah" is a song by English pop band Breathe, released in May 1987 as the band's debut American single, and third in the United Kingdom following "In All Honesty". The song was written by band members David Glasper and Marcus Lillington. Upon its initial release, the single failed to chart in either the United Kingdom or United States. Following Jonah's initial issue in edited form as a single, the full 4:49 version was included on the band's debut album All That Jazz, released in August 1987. A remix of "Jonah" was re-released in the United Kingdom in October 1988, reaching No. 60 on the Top 100 Singles chart.

== Track listings ==
7" single (UK: SRN 35) (US: AM-2971)

A. "Jonah" - 3:54

B. "In All Honesty" - 3:51

12" single (UK: SRN 35-12)

A1. "Jonah" [A Whaleofamix] - 7:42

B1. "Jonah" - 3:54

B2. "In All Honesty" [U.S. Remix] - 3:51

All songs written by David Glasper and Marcus Lillington.All songs published by Virgin Music, Inc.

== Music videos ==
There were two music videos produced for the original version of this song. The first, to accompany the release of "Jonah" in the U.K., was filmed in Barcelona, directed by Mark Lebon and Nick Jones, and produced at Media Lab Ltd.

The second was directed by Drew Carolan, and produced for the American market in October 1987.

== 1988 re-release ==
"Jonah (re-release)"
- 1988 UK re-release cover

Single by Breathe

from the album All That Jazz
- B-side: "Liberties of Love"
- Released: October 1988
- Recorded: 1987
- Genre: Pop
- Label: Siren Records
- Songwriters: David Glasper, Marcus Lillington
- Producer: Chris Porter

Breathe singles chronology
"How Can I Fall?" (1988)	"Jonah (re-release)" (1988)	"Don't Tell Me Lies" (1989)

Encouraged by the success of the single "Hands to Heaven", which reached No. 2 in the U.S. and No. 4 in the U.K. during August 1988, "Jonah" received additional production by Paul Staveley O'Duffy, and treatment by remixer Bob Kraushaar. "Jonah" was re-released in Britain in October 1988 as the band's seventh single on home soil, peaking at No. 60 on the Top 100 Singles chart.

=== Track listings ===
7" single (UK: SRN 95)

A. "Jonah" - 3:35

B. "Liberties Of Love" - 3:30

A limited edition (SRN95B) included 3 badges.

12" single (UK: SRNT 95)

A1. "Jonah" [Extended Mix] - 7:42

B1. "Jonah" [7" Version] - 3:39

B2. "Won't You Come Back?" [Extended] - 6:02

A limited edition picture disc version was also released (SRNTY 95).

CD single (UK: SRNCD 95)

1. "Jonah" [7" version] - 3:39
2. "Liberties of Love" - 3:34
3. "Won't You Come Back?" [Extended] - 6:02
4. "Hands to Heaven" - 4:17

All songs written by David Glasper and Marcus Lillington, except "Liberties of Love" written by David Glasper and Danny Schogger. All songs published by Virgin Music, Inc. except “Liberties Of Love” published by Virgin Music, Inc./Schogger Songs Ltd.

=== Music video ===
A new music video directed by Greg Gold was lensed for the 1988 re-release of "Jonah", becoming the third clip for this song.

=== Chart performance ===
In its second attempt at the British charts, "Jonah" debuted in the Top 100 at No. 77 on 15 October 1988 and peaked at No. 60 on 29 October 1988.

Chart (1988)	Peak position
UK Singles Chart	60

== Personnel ==
=== Band ===
- David Glasper: vocals
- Marcus Lillington: guitars
- Ian Spice: drums
- Michael Delahunty: bass

=== Production ===
- Produced by Chris Porter ("Jonah"), Bob Sargeant ("Liberties Of Love", "Won't You Come Back", "Hands To Heaven")
- Mixing: Chris Porter ("Liberties Of Love", "Won't You Come Back", "Hands to Heaven")
- Engineers: Chris Porter ("Jonah"), John Madden ("Liberties Of Love", "Won't You Come Back", "Hands To Heaven")
- Additional Production: Paul Staveley O'Duffy ("Jonah")
- Remixing: Bob Kraushaar ("Jonah")
- Design: Bill Smith Studio
- Photography: Simon Fowler

Re-release

- Produced by: Chris Porter ("Jonah"), Bob Sargeant ("In All Honesty")
- Engineers: Chris Porter ("Jonah"), John Gallen ("In All Honesty")
- Remixing: Walter Turbitt ("In All Honesty"[U.S. Remix])
- Arranged by Breathe
- Design: London 7202578
- Photography: Cindy Palmano (U.K.), Mark Lebon (U.S.)
