= Breathe (British band) =

English pop rock group

- Original lineup, 1986

Background information
- Origin: London, England
- Genres: Pop; soul; sophisti-pop; easy listening
- Years active: 1984–1992
- Labels: Siren; A&M; Virgin
- Past members: David Glasper; Marcus Lillington; Ian "Spike" Spice; Michael "Mick" Delahunty

Breathe were an English pop band formed in London in 1984. The band enjoyed chart success in the late 1980s and early 1990s with hit singles "Don't Tell Me Lies", "How Can I Fall?" and "Say a Prayer". The group's biggest hit was "Hands to Heaven", which reached No. 2 in the United States in August 1988.

== Early years ==
The members of Breathe were childhood friends who attended Yateley School, a comprehensive in north-east Hampshire. During 1982 they formed a five-piece jazz-infused outfit called Catch 22, performing covers and the occasional original song. The lineup consisted of David Glasper (vocals), Marcus Lillington (guitar & keyboards), Phill Harrison (bass), Michael Delahunty (bass guitar), and Ian Spice (drums). In a 1990 interview, Glasper offered the following recollections:

I was 17 when the band started, so the other guys were two years younger than myself, 15 ... we had bands that we loved, but it was so far apart in musical tastes... It was just this confusion of different styles. Marcus and Phill were into things like Led Zep and Floyd, that area. I was into things like the Eagles, Little Feat, some soul stuff. Spike was probably into heavier, sort of rock music. So we had all these different kind of styles, which at first was just like a terrible mixture... So we played around our local area quite a lot and that helped kind of formulate or create some kind of style.

After Phill Harrison left Catch 22 to join the Fire Brigade, the band became known as Breathe.

== Career ==
=== 1984–1989 ===
In 1984, Breathe began working on some demos. These songs were introduced to personnel from Virgin Records, which led to a recording contract in 1985 with its subsidiary Siren Records.

By May 1985, Breathe was in the studio, and in January 1986, the band released the single "Don't Tell Me Lies" in the United Kingdom. The song was a modest success, reaching No. 77 on the UK Singles Chart. Their second single, "In All Honesty", was released in Britain in May 1986, but failed to chart.

It was a common industry practice to break a new artist with an up-tempo number, so in May 1987, an abbreviated mix of "Jonah" was chosen instead of "Hands to Heaven" as Breathe's third UK single. Los Angeles-based label A&M Records released the album All That Jazz in the United States on 24 August 1987, issuing "Jonah" as Breathe's first stateside single. "Jonah" did not chart in either the United States or the United Kingdom.

At the end of August 1987, Siren Records released the single "All That Jazz" in Britain as a prelude to the full-length same-titled album, originally scheduled for an October UK release. Although this title track did not chart, the album would soon go on to score the group two of the band's best-known hits, "Hands to Heaven" and "How Can I Fall?".

In September 1987, Breathe embarked on their first live national tour, The Big Blow Tour. Between 9 and 28 September, the band played 17 dates.

Faced with four unsuccessful singles after "All That Jazz" failed to reach the Top 100 Singles chart, Siren released "Hands To Heaven" in October 1987, while A&M Records issued "Hands To Heaven" in January 1988 as Breathe's second American single. Siren Records released a remix of "Any Trick" in March 1988.

In America, "Hands To Heaven" debuted on the Billboard Adult Contemporary chart on 20 February 1988. With repeated rotation of the music video on VH1, "Hands To Heaven" crept onto the Billboard Hot 100 at No. 90 on 16 April and drifted about the lower regions of the chart for the following two months until it finally broke into the Top 40 in June. The single reached No. 2 in the US in 1988 and No. 4 on the UK Singles Chart.

In mid-1988, the group experienced managerial and personnel problems that led to the departures of manager Karl Adams and, more significantly, bass player Michael Delahunty. David Glasper stated that Delahunty had been fired, and that the decision "had been made on purely musical terms."

As the band's next single in the United States, A&M chose "How Can I Fall?". This song cracked the Billboard Hot Adult Contemporary chart on 3 September and reached the Hot 100 one week later. In Britain, with the success of "Hands to Heaven", Siren Records decided to revamp the album All That Jazz, which had not yet charted. A new cover was commissioned to reflect the changed band lineup, with the track listing altered by the addition of a remix of "Don't Tell Me Lies".

In the United Kingdom, Breathe toured between 14 and 27 September 1988 as the opening act for Belinda Carlisle during her Good Heavens Tour.

All That Jazz was re-released in the UK on 26 September 1988, and debuted on the British album chart the week of 8 October 1988. That same month, Breathe performed at the Ku Club on the Mediterranean island of Ibiza as part of the Ibiza '88 music festival. Also in October, the remixed "Jonah" was released as Breathe's seventh single in the UK, and found minor chart success with a peak of No. 60.

By September 1988, Breathe had also began to work on their second album titled Peace of Mind.

In the United States, "How Can I Fall?" continued to climb the charts, hitting No. 1 on the Adult Contemporary chart for two weeks in November and peaking at No. 3 on the Billboard Hot 100.

When Billboard's Top 100 Singles of 1988 were calculated, "Hands To Heaven" came in at No. 9, while "How Can I Fall?" was ranked No. 27 the following year.

On 3 January 1989, A&M issued a remixed version of "Don't Tell Me Lies" as a single. When the single reached No. 10 on 18 March, Breathe became the first group in A&M's 27-year history to achieve three Top 10 singles from its debut album. The song also reached No. 5 on the adult contemporary chart. In the United Kingdom, Siren issued the remix of "Don't Tell Me Lies" in early March. Neither of the successful US follow-ups translated to the British charts; "How Can I Fall?" peaked at No. 48, and "Don't Tell Me Lies" at No. 45.

In April 1989, A&M released "All This I Should Have Known" in the US as the final single from All That Jazz. While it made No. 34 placing on the Adult Contemporary chart, it missed the Hot 100.

In May 1989, Billboard Magazine named David Glasper (number 12) and Marcus Lillington (number 13) in its top 20 pop songwriters for 1988. Later in the year, they were honoured at the ASCAP annual pop awards, held in London on 27 September, for "Hands To Heaven" and "How Can I Fall?"

=== 1990-1992 ===
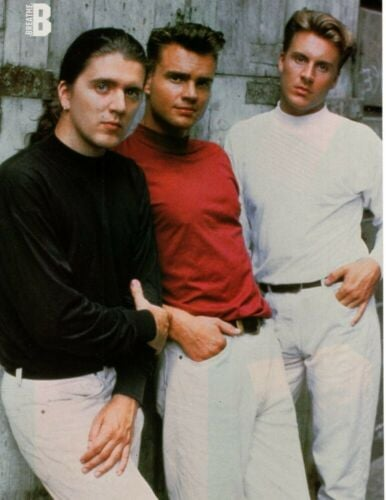
Promotional photo of Breathe, taken in 1990, and following the departure of Michael Delahunty two years earlier.

David Glasper and Marcus Lillington continued to pen songs for the band's second album Peace of Mind and by December 1989 Breathe was back in the studio with producer Bob Sargeant. This album also saw Glasper collaborate with prolific songwriter Francis "Eg" White on four tracks.

In 1990, David Glasper and Marcus Lillington were again honoured amongst songwriters whose songs had achieved the greatest airplay in the US during the previous year. At the ASCAP Pop awards, held on 26 September 1990, they were recognised for the success of "How Can I Fall?" and "Don't Tell Me Lies".

Peace of Mind was released on 20 August 1990 in the UK, Europe and internationally, and issued in the United States on 4 September 1990.

Three commercial singles were released from Peace of Mind - the first being "Say a Prayer", issued by A&M in the United States during August 1990. The song reached No. 21 on the Billboard Hot 100 chart, and peaked at No. 3 on the Billboard Adult Contemporary chart. In the United Kingdom, "Say a Prayer" was released by Siren in October 1990 as the second single from the album (after "Say Hello") where it peaked at No. 93 in the Top 100.

"Say Hello" was issued on 3 September 1990 as a single in the UK and Europe only, achieving a modest top placing of No. 88 on the UK singles chart on 15 September.

"Does She Love That Man?" became the third, and final single lifted from Peace of Mind. Released in November 1990, it failed to enter the UK singles chart. In the United States, the single was issued with the artist billed as "Breathe featuring David Glasper". It peaked at No. 34 on the Billboard Hot 100 chart in mid-January 1991 and No. 17 on the Adult Contemporary chart.

While a fourth commercial single did not eventuate from Peace of Mind or from Breathe, A&M Records did issue "Without Your Love" to radio in the U.S. as a promotional single in early 1991. With this release, the artist was again billed as ‘Breathe featuring David Glasper’.

By 1992 Breathe had disbanded, allegedly due to their frustration with the lack of promotional support they were receiving from A&M, which had been acquired by PolyGram (now Universal Music Group) in 1989.

In a 2012 interview, Marcus Lillington stated that the band "kind of fell apart as a band during the making of Peace of Mind. We just weren't into promoting it in the same way as All That Jazz. ... I also don't think the songs were quite up to the standard of the first album".

== Members ==
Final lineup

- David Glasper – vocals
- Marcus Lillington – guitars, keyboards
- Ian Spice ("Spike") – drums, percussion

Former members

- Michael "Mick" Delahunty – bass

Timeline

Musical roles adapted from album liner notes.

Member details

David Glasper: born on 4 January 1965 in Cardigan, Wales, David John Glasper became the third child of Creswell (1928–91) and Dorothy Glasper (née Nichols, b. 1927), who had been married in 1950. His two older sisters were named Susan and Jane. In November 1988, Smash Hits magazine stated that David Glasper was 6 ft 2 in (188 cm) tall with hazel eyes, and drove a blue Volkswagen Beetle with American number plates. Producer and engineer Chris Porter, who worked with Glasper during 1987–88, later recalled that he "was a sensitive soul and very earnest".

Marcus Lillington: born on 28 February 1967 in Bideford, Devon, Marcus Brian John Lillington was the third child of Brian and Margaret Lillington, who had been married in 1958, and a younger brother to sisters Jane and Sarah. In November 1988, Smash Hits magazine stated that Marcus was 5 ft 10 in (178 cm) tall with blue eyes.

Ian Spice (nicknamed "Spike"): born on 18 September 1966 in Chiswick, West London, Ian Michael Spice was the first child of Michael (b. 1939) and Pamela Spice (née Hedges, b. 1941), who were married in early 1962. A younger brother, Colin, was born in early 1969. A magazine article in 1988 reported that "Spike" was 6 ft 1 in (185 cm) tall, blue-eyed, drove an orange Volkswagen Beetle, and had once worked in a toy factory. Music producer and engineer Chris Porter, who worked with the band during 1987–88, later stated that "Spike probably had the toughest job at the time". Ian Spice died on 24 September 2000.

Michael Delahunty: born Michael Christopher Delahunty in 1965.

== Discography ==
=== Studio albums ===
Title	Details	Peak chart positions					Certifications (sales threshold)
Title	Details	UK	CAN	GER	SWE	US	Certifications (sales threshold)
All That Jazz	Release date: 24 August 1987; Label: A&M, Siren, Virgin; Formats: CD, cassette, LP	22	43	50	12	34	US: Gold; Canada: Gold; UK: Silver
Peace of Mind	Release date: 4 September 1990; Label: A&M, Siren, Virgin; Formats: CD, cassette, LP	—	—	—	—	116	
"—" denotes releases that did not chart

=== Compilation albums ===
Title	Details	Content	Credits
Best of Breathe ^{[a]}	Release date: 2004; Label: EMI Philippines; Formats: CD	Contains seven tracks from the studio album All That Jazz (1987), and five from Peace of Mind (1990).	Compiled by, Producer: Matt Fernandez; Executive Producer: Chris Sy; Remastered by Ray Ang

^{^a}Manufactured and distributed as a regional release, Best of Breathe contains no previously unreleased or non-album material and was produced without the involvement of the original performers.

=== Box sets ===
Title	Details	Content
This Shining Moment. Recordings 1986 to 1990 ^{[b]}	Released: October 2016; Label: Flood Gallery Records; Formats: LP	Contains LPs of both studio albums All That Jazz (1987) and Peace of Mind (1990), a seven-inch single of "In All Honesty," and a translucent blue vinyl twelve-inch single featuring the US extended version of "Hands To Heaven" and a selection of B-sides and rarities. A total of 28 tracks.

^{^b}Released without the involvement of the band.

=== Interview cassette ===
"An Interview and Music with Breathe's David Glasper"

- Released: 1990
- Label: Siren
- Format: Cassette single

Promotional audio cassette featuring an interview with Glasper, inter-cut with a portion of Hands to Heaven, from their first album All That Jazz, and songs from their sophomore album Peace of Mind. In this interview, David talks about the background behind writing the album, and behind the meaning and ideas of some of the individual songs, like the three singles from that album, including Say Hello, Does She Love That Man and Say a Prayer, though other songs from the album are also discussed. Along with this, David discusses his inspirations for the songs, and inspirations from other artists.

=== Singles ===
Year	Month	Single	Peak chart positions									B-Side	Album
Year	Month	Single	UK	AUS	CAN	GER	NOR	NZ	SWE	US	US AC	B-Side	Album
1986	Jan	"Don't Tell Me Lies" (original release)	77	x	x	x	x	x	x	x	x	"Moments"	All That Jazz
1986	May	"In All Honesty"	—	x	x	x	x	x	x	x	x	"Take a Little Time"	Non-album single^{[a]}
1987	May	"Jonah" (original release)	—	—	—	—	—	—	—	—	—	"In All Honesty"	All That Jazz
1987	Aug	"All That Jazz"	—	—	—	—	—	—	—	x	x	"Stay"	All That Jazz
1987	Oct	"Hands to Heaven"	4	95	5	29	4	10	14	2	2	"Life and Times"	All That Jazz
1988	Mar	"Any Trick"	—	x	x	x	x	x	x	x	x	"Make It Funky"	All That Jazz
1988	Aug	"How Can I Fall?"	48	—	2	—	—	—	—	3	1	"Monday Morning Blues" (US) "All This I Should Have Known" (UK)	All That Jazz
1988	Oct	"Jonah" (re-release)	60	—	x	—	—	—	—	x	x	"Liberties of Love"	All That Jazz
1989	Jan	"Don't Tell Me Lies" (re-release)	45	—	10	—	—	—	—	10	5	"Liberties of Love" (US) "Monday Morning Blues" (UK)	All That Jazz
1989	Apr	"All This I Should Have Known"	x	x	x	x	x	x	x	—	34	"In All Honesty"	All That Jazz
1990	Aug	"Say a Prayer"	93	97	6	—	—	—	—	21	3	"Say a Prayer" [Save My Soul] (US) "May Lightning Strike" (UK)	Peace of Mind
1990	Sep	"Say Hello"	87	x	x	x	x	x	x	x	x	"All That Jazz"	Peace of Mind
1990	Nov	"Does She Love That Man?"	—	—	19	—	—	—	—	34	17	"Say It" (US) "Where Angels Fear" (UK)	Peace of Mind
"—" denotes releases that did not chart, "x" denotes releases not released in that country

- ^{^a}Although a non-album single, "In All Honesty" was included on the 1988 UK/European cassette re-release of the album All That Jazz

== Videography ==
=== Home videos ===
Title	Details
All That Jazz: The Video Singles	Released: 1988; Label: Siren; Format: VHS
All That Jazz: The Videos	Released: 1989; Label: A&M; Format: VHS
Breathe (David Glasper) Music Video Anthology	Format: DVD ^{[a]}

^{^a} Released without the involvement of the band

- All That Jazz: The Video Singles features five music videos: "Hands To Heaven", "How Can I Fall?", the original "Don't Tell Me Lies", and two versions of "Jonah".
- All That Jazz: The Videos presents four music videos throughout an interview with the band which has been edited into five short segments. Music videos shown are "Jonah", "Hands To Heaven", "How Can I Fall?" and the 1989 version of "Don't Tell Me Lies".
- Breathe (David Glasper) Music Video Anthology features ten music videos, including the 3rd version of Jonah, Say a Prayer, Does She Love That Man?, and others like All this I should Have known.

=== Music videos ===
Title	Year	Director(s)
"Don't Tell Me Lies" (1st)	1985	Simon Milne
"In All Honesty"	1986	-
"Jonah" (1st)	1987	Mark Lebon & Nick Jones
"Jonah" (2nd)	1987	Drew Carolan
"Hands To Heaven"	1987	Eamon McCabe
"How Can I Fall?"	1988	Greg Gold
"Jonah" (3rd)	1988	Greg Gold
"Don't Tell Me Lies" (2nd)	1989	The Molotov Brothers
"All This I Should Have Known"	1989	-
"Say A Prayer"	1990	Mike Rowles
"Say A Prayer (Save My Soul)"	1990	Mike Rowles
"Say Hello"	1990	-
"Does She Love That Man?"	1990	Jesse Dylan

== Management ==
At the start of its recording career, Breathe was represented by Karl Adams of Spearhead Management, but after frustrations concerning the band's direction, Breathe and Adams parted ways in early 1988. (Adams appeared in the credits for the original issue of the album All That Jazz, but not the 1988 re-release). David Glasper later stated, during promotion of "Hands To Heaven", that "What hurt the group was management's emphasis on a major selling point for most bands – appearance. We were four young guys. It doesn't take much business acumen to see we could have appealed to teen-age girls.... Our first manager used to scream at us about image".

Following the departure of Karl Adams, Breathe employed the services of Paul King's Outlaw Management.

Paul King

Paul King began his music career promoting live shows at Brunel University in 1970 whilst studying Nuclear Chemistry. Brunel became a major venue on the touring circuit with concerts by Elton John, Genesis, Humble Pie, The Kinks, The Sex Pistols and others.

Attempts by King to resurrect his pop career, promoting the likes of Morrissey, ended in liquidation, with Morrissey Tours left £33,000 out of pocket. King was also involved in fashion retailing and a telecoms firm, Marlin Telecom, which was wound up by Customs & Excise in October 2000.

Paul King died in October 2015 following a battle with cancer. He was 63.
