= The Shape of Grace =

Studio album by Out of the Grey
- Released: December 11, 1992
- Studio: Kaleidoscope Sound (Bellevue, Tennessee); Sound Stage Studios (Nashville, Tennessee); Studio At Mole End (Franklin, Tennessee)
- Genre: CCM
- Length: 40:50
- Label: Sparrow
- Producer: Charlie Peacock

Out of the Grey chronology
Out of the Grey (1991)	The Shape of Grace (1992)	Diamond Days (1994)

The Shape of Grace is the second album by Out of the Grey, released on December 11, 1992.

== Track listing ==
All tracks are written by Christine Denté, Scott Denté and Charlie Peacock, unless otherwise noted.

No.	Title	Writer(s)	Length
1.	"Steady Me"		3:39
2.	"Nothing's Gonna Keep Me From You"		4:03
3.	"The Shape of Grace"	Christine Denté; Scott Dente	5:22
4.	"Everywhere That You Go"		4:30
5.	"Dear Marianne"	Christine Denté	3:29
6.	"Feels Like Real Life"		3:31
7.	"The Door of Heaven"		4:11
8.	"To Keep Love Alive"		3:35
9.	"Bigger Than Life"		3:42
10.	"Leave the Light On"		4:48
Total length:			40:50

== Personnel ==
Out of the Grey

- Christine Denté – vocals, backing vocals
- Scott Denté – vocals, backing vocals, acoustic guitars

Musicians

- Charlie Peacock – acoustic piano, keyboards
- Jerry McPherson – electric guitars
- Jimmie Lee Sloas – bass
- Mark Hammond – drums
- Sam Levine – soprano saxophone, flute, recorder
- Vicki Hampton – additional backing vocals (9)

Production

- Peter York – executive producer
- Charlie Peacock – producer
- Craig Hansen – recording, mixing (3-10)
- Kevin B. Hipp – assistant engineer
- Garrett Rockey – assistant engineer
- Jay Schwartzendruber – assistant engineer
- Craig White – assistant engineer
- Rick Will – mixing (1, 2)
- Ken Love – mastering at MasterMix (Nashville, Tennessee)
- Simon Levy – art direction, design
- Ron Keith – photography
- Jeffrey Tay – stylist
- Robyn Lynch – hair, make-up
- Creative Management Group – management
