= Out of the Grey (Out of the Grey album) =

Studio album by Out of the Grey
- Released: June 17, 1991
- Studio: Kaleidoscope Sound (Bellevue, Tennessee); Digital Recorders and Sixteenth Avenue Sound (Nashville, Tennessee)
- Genre: Contemporary Christian music
- Length: 40:44
- Label: Sparrow
- Producer: Charlie Peacock

Out of the Grey chronology
Out of the Grey (1991)	The Shape of Grace (1992)

Professional ratings
Review scores
Source	Rating
AllMusic	4/5 stars

Out of the Grey is the debut album by Out of the Grey, released in 1991. It was ranked 47th in the book CCM Presents: The 100 Greatest Albums in Christian Music.

== Track listing ==
All songs written by Christine and Scott Denté, except where noted.

1. "Wishes" (Christine Denté, Scott Denté, Charlie Peacock) – 4:58
2. "Write My Life" (Christine Denté, Scott Denté, Charlie Peacock) – 4:11
3. "Remember This" (Christine Denté, Scott Denté, Charlie Peacock) – 4:31
4. "The Dance" (Christine Denté, Scott Denté, Charlie Peacock) – 3:36
5. "He Is Not Silent" – 4:00
6. "Better Way to Fall" – 4:31
7. "Time Will Tell" (Christine Denté, Scott Denté, Charlie Peacock) – 3:21
8. "Perfect Circle" – 5:00
9. "The Only Moment" (Christine Denté, Scott Denté, Charlie Peacock) – 3:15
10. "The Deep" – 3:21

== Personnel ==
Out of the Grey

- Christine Denté – vocals
- Scott Denté – vocals, acoustic guitars, electric guitars

Musicians

- Charlie Peacock – keyboards, acoustic piano, programming, arrangements
- Craig Hansen – additional programming
- Blair Masters – sampling
- Jerry McPherson – electric guitars
- Tommy Sims – bass
- Steve Grossman – drums
- Chris McHugh – drums
- Eric Darken – percussion
- Rick Will – tambourine
- Vince Ebo – backing vocals
- Vicki Hampton – backing vocals

Production

- Peter York – executive producer
- Charlie Peacock – producer
- Craig Hansen – engineer, mixing (8, 10)
- Jonathan Beach – assistant engineer
- Buzz Leffler – assistant engineer
- Garrett Rockey – assistant engineer
- Kevin Twit – additional engineer
- Rick Will – mixing (1, 2, 4)
- Bill Deaton – mixing (3, 5–7, 9)
- Graham Lewis – mix assistant (3, 5–7, 9)
- Ken Love – mastering at MasterMix (Nashville, Tennessee)
- Heather Horne – art direction, design
- Chris Carroll – photography
