= Say Hello (Breathe song) =

- UK & International cover

Single by Breathe

from the album Peace of Mind
- B-side: "All That Jazz"
- Released: 3 September 1990
- Recorded: 1990
- Genre: Pop; adult contemporary
- Length: 3:52
- Label: Siren; Virgin
- Songwriter(s): David Glasper; Francis White
- Producer(s): Bob Sargeant; Breathe

Breathe singles chronology
"Say A Prayer (US issue)" (1990)	"Say Hello" (1990)	"Does She Love That Man?" (1990)

Audio sample
- "Say Hello": file; help

"Say Hello" was released in the United Kingdom and Europe on 3 September 1990, as Breathe's first single from the album Peace of Mind, and twelfth overall. It was not issued as a single in the United States by A&M Records, which had issued "Say A Prayer" the previous month as the album’s first single.

The song was written by David Glasper and Francis 'Eg' White.

The B-side song "All That Jazz" was the title track from the band's first album, and had previously been released as a UK-only single in August 1987.

"Say Hello" peaked at No. 87 on the UK Singles Chart.

== Track listings ==
UK 7" single (SIREN SRN131)

A. "Say Hello" - 3:52

B. "All That Jazz" - 4:07

The 7" single was available in a limited-edition box containing three personality portraits (SRNB131)

UK 12" single (SIREN SRNT131)

A1. "Say Hello" - 3:52

A2. "All That Jazz" - 4:07

B1. "Say Hello (Again)" - 4:55

B2. "Hands To Heaven [Remix]" - 4:18

UK CD single (SIREN SRNCD 131)

1. "Say Hello" - 3:52

2. "Say Hello (Again)" - 4:55

3. "All That Jazz" - 4:07

4. "Hands to Heaven [Remix]" - 4:18

The Limited edition CD single included a bonus set of three band members portraits housed inside a slim video style box with picture insert.

All songs written by David Glasper and Marcus Lillington, except "Say Hello" written by David Glasper and Francis White. All songs published by BMG VM Music Limited, except "Say Hello" published by BMG Gold Songs/Kobalt Songs Music Publishing.

== Personnel ==
=== Band ===
- David Glasper (vocals)
- Marcus Lillington (guitar, keyboards, programming)
- Ian Spice (drums)
- Michael Delahunty (bass guitar) on “All That Jazz” & “Hands To Heaven”.

=== Production ===
- Engineer: John Gallen (“Say Hello”), Chris Porter (“All That Jazz”); John Madden (“Hands To Heaven”).
- Mastered By: Ian Cooper
- Mixed By: Julian Mendelsohn (“Say Hello”), Chris Porter (“Hands To Heaven”)
- Producer: Chris Porter ("All That Jazz")
- Remixing: Julian Mendelsohn (“Say Hello (Again)”); Chris Porter (“Hands To Heaven”); Bob Kraushaar (“All That Jazz”).
- A&R: Simon Hicks
- Art Direction, Design: John Warwicker, Vivid I.D.
- Management: Jonny Too Bad, Paul King
- Photography: Martin Brading

David Glasper (vocals), Marcus Lillington (guitar), and Ian “Spike” Spice (drums). Michael “Mick” Delahunty (bass guitar) on “All That Jazz” & “Hands To Heaven”.

== Charts ==
Chart (1990)	Peak position
UK Singles (Official Charts Company)	87
