= Conversations (Sara Groves album) =

Studio album by Sara Groves
- Released: March 20, 2001
- Studio: Sound Kitchen and Dark Horse Recording (Franklin, Tennessee); Tom Laune's pad
- Genre: Contemporary Christian music, Christian AC, acoustic, folk
- Length: 58:34
- Label: INO
- Producer: Nate Sabin

Sara Groves chronology
| Past the Wishing (1998) | Conversations (2001) | All Right Here (2002) |

Conversations is the first studio album and second album overall from Christian singer-songwriter Sara Groves, and was released on March 20, 2001, by INO Records. The producer on the album is Nate Sabin.

== Critical reception ==
Professional ratings
Review scores
| Source | Rating |
|---|---|
| AllMusic | 2.5/5 stars |
| CCM Magazine | unrated |
| Christianity Today | unrated |
| Cross Rhythms | 9/10 squares |
| New Release Tuesday | 4.5/5 stars |

At Christianity Today, Russ Breimeier gave an unrated review, calling this a "truly outstanding album." Sue Rann of Cross Rhythms rated the album nine out of ten squares, proclaiming this to be "Great stuff from a transparently gifted American singer/songwriter hearteningly offering musical and lyrical intelligence in a scene heavy with disposable Nashville pop." At CCM Magazine, Michele Howe gave an unrated review, affirming that "Conversations is a rare find for those who seek, yes, thirst for honest answers to life's difficult questions", and noting how "Listeners will happily surrender to Sara Groves' soulful, rich vocals, which declare with stumbling humility our ongoing search for God." Kevin Davis of New Release Tuesday rated the album four-and-a-half stars, exclaiming that this is a "perfect debut album with standout songs". However, AllMusic's Ashleigh Kittle rated the album just two-and-a-half stars in the only mixed review and rating on the project.

== Commercial performance ==
For the Billboard charting week of April 7, 2001, Conversations ranked at No. 35 for the best-selling albums in the Christian music market via the Christian Albums position.

== Track listing ==
All tracks are written by Sara Groves.

| No. | Title | Length |
|---|---|---|
| 1. | "Conversations" | 4:16 |
| 2. | "The Word" | 4:09 |
| 3. | "Painting Pictures of Egypt" | 4:26 |
| 4. | "Hello Lord" | 4:19 |
| 5. | "Generations" | 4:04 |
| 6. | "This Journey Is My Own" | 5:48 |
| 7. | "How It Is Between Us" | 4:36 |
| 8. | "What Do I Know" | 4:49 |
| 9. | "Cave of Adullum" | 4:49 |
| 10. | "Know My Heart" | 4:57 |
| 11. | "Going Home" | 4:39 |
| 12. | "He's Always Been Faithful" | 3:46 |
| 13. | "Tent in the Center of Town" | 3:56 |
| Total length: | | 58:34 |

== Personnel ==
Musicians

- Sara Groves – vocals, arrangements, acoustic piano (12, 13)
- Jeff Roach – acoustic piano (1–6, 8, 9, 11), keyboards (2, 3, 5–7, 10, 11)
- Gary Burnette – guitars (1–3, 5–9, 11), electric guitar (4), acoustic guitar (10)
- Nate Sabin – arrangements, electric guitar solo (3, 10), acoustic guitar (4, 10), percussion (4)
- Peter Ostroushko – mandolin (1), fiddle (9)
- Matt Pierson – bass (1–7, 10, 11)
- Tim Smith – bass (8, 9)
- Dan Needham – drums (1–3, 5–7, 9–11), percussion (1, 2, 5, 7, 9, 10)
- Marc Anderson – percussion (3, 4, 9–11)
- Troy Groves – klong yao (11)
- Greg Lewis – string arrangements (8)
- Solveg Peterson – cello (8, 12), viola (8)
- Sarah Bertsch – violin (8)

Background vocalists

- Nate Sabin – backing vocals (1, 11)
- Sara Groves – backing vocals (2, 5, 6, 11), credited as Nancy Colbaugh (12)
- Michael Olson – backing vocals (2, 5)
- Lori Sabin – backing vocals (2, 5, 6, 10, 11)
- Andrew Brown – backing vocals (11)
- Katie Colbaugh – backing vocals (11)
- Dwight Colbaugh – backing vocals (12)

=== Production ===
- Troy Groves – executive producer
- Nate Sabin – producer, recording, mixing (1, 4–13)
- Keith Compton – recording
- Tom Laune – mixing (2, 3)
- Hank Williams – mastering at MasterMix (Nashville, Tennessee)
- Lloyd Colbough – design, layout
- Andy Conant – design, layout
- Greg Wanbough – photography

== Charts ==
| Chart (2001) | Peak position |
|---|---|
| US Top Christian Albums (Billboard) | 35 |
