= Say a Prayer (Breathe song) =

- UK & International cover

Single by Breathe

from the album Peace of Mind
- B-side: "May Lightning Strike" (UK) "Say a Prayer [Save My Soul]" (US)
- Released: August 1990 (US); October 1990 (UK)
- Recorded: 1990
- Genre: Pop
- Length: 3:50
- Label: Siren; A&M; Virgin
- Songwriters: David Glasper; Marcus Lillington
- Producers: Bob Sargeant; Breathe

Breathe singles chronology
"All This I Should Have Known" (1989)	"Say a Prayer" (1990)	"Say Hello" (1990)

Alternative cover
- US cassette single cover

Audio sample
- "Say a Prayer": file; help

"Say a Prayer" is a song by British band Breathe, released in the United States during August 1990 as the first single from their second and final album, Peace of Mind (1990). The song was Breathe's sixth stateside single, and eleventh overall. In the United Kingdom, "Say a Prayer" was released in October 1990 as the second single from Peace of Mind, following "Say Hello".

The single peaked at No. 21 on the Billboard Hot 100 chart, No. 3 on the Billboard Adult Contemporary chart, No. 6 in Canada and No. 93 on the UK Singles Chart.

== Track listings ==
UK 7" single (SIREN SRN133)

A. "Say a Prayer" - 3:50
B. "May Lightning Strike" - 4:25

US cassette single (A&M 75021 1519 4)

A. "Say a Prayer" [LP Version] - 3:49
B. "Say a Prayer" [Save My Soul 7"] - 3:57

UK 12" single (SIREN SRNT133)

A1. "Say a Prayer" - 3:50
A2. "Say a Prayer" [Remix] - 3:57
B1. "Say a Prayer" [Save My Soul] - 6:32
B2. "May Lightning Strike" - 4:25

US 12" single (A&M 75021 2337 1)

A1. "Say a Prayer" [Oh Mercy's House Mix]
A2. "Say a Prayer" [Dub]
B1. "Say a Prayer" [Save My Soul Vocal Mix]
B2. "Say a Prayer" [Save My Soul Dub]

US 12" maxi-single 33RPM (A&M 75021 2337 1)

A1. "Say a Prayer" [Save My Soul 12"] - 6:28
A2. "Say a Prayer" [Save My Soul Dub] - 5:45
A3. "Say a Prayer" [LP Version] - 3:49
B1. "Say a Prayer" [Oh Mercy! House 12"] - 6:30
B2. "Say a Prayer" [Oh Mercy! House Dub] - 6:08
B3. "Say a Prayer" [Oh! Mercy! House 7"] - 3:50

UK CD single (SIREN SRNCD 133)

1. "Say a Prayer" - 3:50
2. "Say a Prayer" [Remix] - 3:57
3. "Say a Prayer" [Save My Soul] - 6:32
4. "May Lightning Strike" - 4:25
- Limited edition CD release included a bonus set of three band members portraits housed inside a slim video style box with picture insert.

All songs written by David Glasper and Marcus Lillington. Published by BMG VM Music Limited.

== Personnel ==
=== Band ===
- David Glasper (vocals)
- Marcus Lillington (guitar, keyboards, programming)
- Ian Spice (drums)

=== Production ===
- Engineer: John Gallen
- Engineer (Assistant): Chris Brown, Simon Van Zwanenberg, Tristan Powell
- Mastered By: Ian Cooper
- Mixed by Julian Mendelsohn
- Mixed By (Assistant): Danton Supple, Steve Fitzmaurice
- Remixing: Daniel Abraham ("Say A Prayer" [Remix], [Save My Soul], [Oh Mercy!])
- A&R: Simon Hicks
- Art Direction, Design: John Warwicker, Vivid I.D.
- Management: Jonny Too Bad, Paul King
- Photography: Martin Brading

== Charts ==
Chart (1990–1991)	Peak Position
Australia (ARIA)	97
Canada Top Singles (RPM)	6
UK Singles (OCC)	93
US Billboard Hot 100	21
US Adult Contemporary (Billboard)	3
US Cash Box Top 100	16

=== Year-end charts ===
Chart (1990)	Position
Canada Top Singles (RPM)	57
