= Diamond Days (Out of the Grey album) =

Studio album by Out of the Grey
- Released: March 1, 1994
- Studio: The Garden (Bellevue, Tennessee); Battery Studios and Sixteenth Avenue Sound (Nashville, Tennessee)
- Genre: CCM
- Length: 40:55
- Label: Sparrow
- Producer: Charlie Peacock

Out of the Grey chronology
The Shape of Grace (1992)	Diamond Days (1994)	Gravity (1995)

Professional ratings
Review scores
Source	Rating
AllMusic	4/5 stars

Diamond Days is the third album by Out of the Grey, released on March 1, 1994. This is the first of two albums that were more Adult Contemporary. The style appealed to contemporary Christian music radio formats with several singles.

== Track listing ==
All tracks are written by Christine Denté, Scott Denté, and Charlie Peacock, unless otherwise noted

No.	Title	Writer(s)	Length
1.	"If I Know You"		3:21
2.	"All We Need"		4:55
3.	"Unfolding"	Christine Denté; Scott Denté	3:22
4.	"Cry For Help"	Christine Denté	3:17
5.	"Diamond Days"		4:33
6.	"Eyes Wide Open"		4:25
7.	"Love Like Breathing"	Christine Denté	4:47
8.	"The One I've Been Waiting For"	Christine Denté; Charlie Peacock	4:07
9.	"What Love Is"		4:22
10.	"Lifelines"	Christine Denté	3:46
Total length:			40:55

== Personnel ==
Out of the Grey

- Christine Denté – vocals
- Scott Denté – vocals, acoustic guitar, electric guitars (6, 10)

Musicians

- Charlie Peacock – keyboards (1–4, 6–10), Wurlitzer electric piano (5)
- Jerry McPherson – electric guitars
- Tommy Sims – bass (1, 2, 5–7, 10), keyboards (4, 7–9)
- Mark Hill – bass (3)
- Jimmie Lee Sloas – bass (4, 8, 9)
- Steve Brewster – drums
- Mark Hammond – percussion (1, 2, 5, 8)
- Eric Darken – percussion (3, 4, 7, 9, 10)
- Carl Marsh – orchestration (5), strings (7, 9)
- Bob Mason – cello (7)
- Conni Ellisor – violin (7)

Production

- Peter York – executive producer
- Charlie Peacock – producer
- Tom Laune – recording, mixing (5, 6, 8–10)
- Kevin B. Hipp – assistant engineer
- Shane D. Wilson – assistant engineer
- Rick Will – mixing (1–4, 7)
- Pete Martinez – mix assistant (1–4, 7)
- Ken Love – mastering at MasterMix (Nashville, Tennessee)
- Karen Philpott – art direction, design
- R.J. Lyons – design
- East-West Design Group – design
- Mark Tucker – photography
- Andi Ashworth – budget administration
- Robyn Lynch – hair, make-up
- Debrae Little – stylist
