= Tell Me What You Know =

Studio album by Sara Groves
- Released: November 6, 2007
- Studios: The Workshop (Nashville, Tennessee)
- Genres: Contemporary Christian music, acoustic, folk
- Length: 46:44
- Label: INO
- Producer: Brown Bannister

Sara Groves chronology
Add to the Beauty (2005)	Tell Me What You Know (2007)	Fireflies and Songs (2009)

Tell Me What You Know is the fifth studio album and seventh overall album from Christian singer and songwriter Sara Groves, and it released on November 6, 2007, by INO Records. The producer on the album is Brown Bannister. This release became critically acclaimed and commercially successful.

== Critical reception ==
Professional ratings
Review scores
Source	Rating
Allmusic	4/5 stars
CCM Magazine	4/5 stars
Christian Broadcasting Network	4/5 spins
Christianity Today	5/5 stars
Cross Rhythms	10/10 squares
Jesus Freak Hideout	4/5 stars
New Release Tuesday	5/5 stars
The Phantom Tollbooth	5/5 stars

Tell Me What You Know garnered critical acclaim from music critics. At Christianity Today, Russ Breimeier rated the album five stars, stating that the album is a "natural progression" for the artist, and that this album is not for everyone but noting this should make you a fan of hers if you ever will be. Andree Farias of Allmusic rated the album four stars, saying that the release "deserves a mention, if not for its overall uniqueness, then for continuing to solidify Groves as one of the most important, consistent Christian singer/songwriters of the new millennium." At CCM Magazine, Deborah Evan Price rated the album four stars, writing that "Sara Groves serves up a compelling collection of songs that strikes the difficult balance between education, inspiration and entertainment."

Mike Rimmer of Cross Rhythms rated the album ten out of ten squares, exclaiming that "Sara Groves is a true artist and the compositions here, with their recurrent themes of compassion for the broken and marginalised are surely the best this passionate crafter of songs has ever penned." At Christian Broadcasting Network, Jennifer E. Jones rated the album four spins, writing that this is "Groves at her best". The Phantom Tollbooth's Bert Saraco rated the album five tocks, commenting that the release "establishes Sara Groves as a dependable artist of consistent quality", and that "This is simply a wonderful project that should convince any listener that Sara Groves is a compelling, important artist who needs to be heard by a wider audience, and has perhaps just given us one of the best albums of the year." At New Release Tuesday, Kevin Davis rated the album five stars, stating that it was quite refreshing "her music, lyrics, overall songwriting and singing voice actually all seem to get better with each release."

== Commercial performance ==
For the Billboard charting week of November 24, 2007, Tell Me What You Know was the No. 194 most sold album in the entirety of the United States by The Billboard 200, and it was the No. 14 most sold album in the Christian music market via the Christian Albums position. Also, it was the No. 2 Heatseekers Album, which is the breaking-and-entry chart.

For the Billboard charting week of May 17, 2008, the album was the No. 1 most sold album in the Christian music market via the Christian Albums chart placement. The very next week of May 24, 2008, the album charted in the entirety of the United States via The Billboard 200 at No. 72.

== Track listing ==
Tracklist
No.	Title	Writer(s)	Length
1.	"Songs for My Sons"	Sara Groves	3:42
2.	"In the Girl There's a Room"	Groves, Charlie Peacock	4:50
3.	"Say a Prayer"	Groves	3:19
4.	"Love Is Still a Worthy Cause"	Groves	4:27
5.	"When the Saints"	Groves	4:12
6.	"Honesty"	Groves	5:39
7.	"Abstraction"	Groves	3:59
8.	"I Saw What I Saw"	Groves	4:18
9.	"It Might Be Hope"	Groves	3:49
10.	"The Long Defeat"	Groves	5:06
11.	"You Are Wonderful"	Groves, Gordon Kennedy	3:23
Total length:			46:44

== Personnel ==
- Sara Groves – vocals, backing vocals (1, 3), acoustic piano (3)
- Blair Masters – acoustic piano (1–7, 9–11), clavinet (1), keyboards (1–7, 9–11)
- Jerry McPherson – electric guitars (1–7, 9–11)
- Scott Denté – dobro (1), acoustic guitars (2–7, 9, 10)
- Paul Moak – electric guitars (2)
- Ben Gowell – electric guitars (2, 5–7, 10)
- Gordon Kennedy – acoustic guitars (11), backing vocals (11)
- Paul Franklin – steel guitar (3)
- Matt Pierson – bass (1–7, 9–11)
- Steve Brewster – drums (1–6, 9–11), percussion (7)
- Marc Anderson – world percussion (2, 10), percussion (3, 5, 6)
- Troy Groves – percussion (5)
- Zach Miller – percussion (5), drums (7)
- John Catchings – strings (8)
- Missi Hale – backing vocals (2, 4, 6, 7, 9, 10)
- Chance Scoggins – backing vocals (2, 4, 7)
- Felicia Wolfe – backing vocals (2, 6, 7, 9, 10)
- Melody Olson – backing vocals (4)
- Michelle Swift – backing vocals (4)
- Bekka Bramlett – backing vocals (5)
- Marshall Hall – backing vocals (5)
- Vicki Hampton – backing vocals (5)
- Tommy Sims – backing vocals (11)

== Production ==
- Troy Groves – executive producer
- Brown Bannister – producer
- F. Reid Shippen – mixing (1, 5)
- Todd Robbins – mixing (2–4, 9)
- Steve Bishir – mixing (6–8, 10, 11)
- Aaron Sternke – additional engineer (5)
- Wayne Thomas – additional engineer (5, 7)
- Hank Williams – mastering at MasterMix (Nashville, Tennessee)
- Wayne Brezinka – design, collage illustration
- Kristin Barlowe – photography
- Dana Salsedo – stylist
- Sheila Davis-Curtis – hair, make-up

== Charts ==
Chart (2007)	Peak position
US Billboard 200	194
US Top Christian Albums (Billboard)	14
US Heatseekers Albums (Billboard)	2
Chart (2008)	Peak position
US Billboard 200	72
US Top Christian Albums (Billboard)	1
