= Hands to Heaven =

Single by Breathe

from the album All That Jazz
- B-side: "Life and Times"
- Released: 20 October 1987
- Genre: Sophisti-pop
- Length: 4:18
- Label: Siren, A&M
- Songwriters: David Glasper, Marcus Lillington
- Producer: Bob Sargeant

Breathe singles chronology
"All That Jazz" (1987)	"Hands to Heaven" (1987)	"Any Trick" (1988)

Music video
- "Hands to Heaven" on YouTube

Audio sample
- file; help

"Hands to Heaven" is a ballad by English band Breathe, taken from their debut studio album, All That Jazz (1987). The song was released as the band's fifth UK single on 20 October 1987 by A&M Records and as their second single in the United States the following year. It was written by group members David Glasper and Marcus Lillington and produced by Bob Sargeant. The B-side of the single features an instrumental track, "Life and Times".

"Hands to Heaven" became Breathe's breakthrough international hit. The single peaked at No. 4 on the UK Singles Chart in August 1988. In the United States, it spent two weeks at No. 2 on the Billboard Hot 100 during the same month. The song also reached No. 2 on the Billboard Adult Contemporary chart. Additionally, "Hands to Heaven" reached the top 10 in Canada, Ireland, New Zealand, and Norway.

== Music video ==
The music video for "Hands to Heaven" was directed by Eamon McCabe and features the band in a surreal, dreamlike sequence. It begins with lead singer David Glasper falling asleep in the back of a black London taxicab, drifting into a series of dreamlike visuals. Throughout the video, the band is shown performing in softly lit, stylized settings, while the surroundings shift among blurred city streets, the cab interior, and abstract performance backdrops. The muted color palette, soft transitions, and reflective cinematography emphasize the song's themes of longing and romantic separation. The video concludes with Glasper waking up in the cab and being driven away by the same driver, completing the narrative loop.

== Track listings ==
All songs were written by David Glasper and Marcus Lillington and published by Virgin Music, Inc.

UK 7-inch single (SIREN SRN68)

A. "Hands to Heaven" – 4:18
B. "Life and Times" – 4:46

A special limited edition of the 7-inch single, which included photos, lyrics, and the Fan Club address, was released in the UK (SRNL 68).

US 7-inch single and cassette single (A&M AM-2991/TS-2991)

A. "Hands to Heaven" – 4:17
B. "Life and Times" – 4:44

UK 12-inch single (SIREN SRNT68)

A1. "Hands to Heaven" (extended Heaven) – 6:23
B1. "Hands to Heaven" (radio mix) – 4:18
B2. "Life and Times" – 4:46

A special limited edition of the 12-inch single featured a poster sleeve.

UK CD single (SIREN SRCD 68)1

1. "Hands to Heaven" – 4:18
2. "All That Jazz" (12-inch version) – 6:15
3. "Stay" (7-inch version) – 3:50
4. "Life and Times" – 4:44

== Personnel ==
Band

- David Glasper – vocals
- Marcus Lillington – guitars, keyboards
- Ian "Spike" Spice – drums
- Mike Delahunty – bass

Guest musician

- Paul "Shilts" Weimar – saxophone

Production

- Arranged by Breathe
- Engineer: John Madden ("Hands to Heaven", "Stay")
- Mixing: John Madden ("Life and Times"), Chris Porter ("All That Jazz")
- Remixing: Chris Porter ("Hands to Heaven")

== Charts ==
=== Weekly charts ===
Chart (1988)	Peak position
Canada Top Singles (RPM)	5
Canada Adult Contemporary (RPM)	2
Europe (Eurochart Hot 100)	13
Ireland (IRMA)	3
New Zealand (Recorded Music NZ)	10
Norway (VG-lista)	4
Sweden (Sverigetopplistan)	14
UK Singles (Official Charts)	4
UK Airplay (Music & Media)	2
US Billboard Hot 100	2
US Adult Contemporary (Billboard)	2
US Cash Box Top Singles	2
West Germany (GfK)	29

=== Year-end charts ===
Chart (1988)	Position
Canada Top Singles (RPM)	54
UK Singles (OCC)	44
US Billboard Hot 100	9
US Adult Contemporary (Billboard)	4
US Cash Box Top Singles	13

== Cover versions ==
- A version recorded by Irish singer Brendan Keeley reached No. 12 on the Irish Singles Chart in 1997
- Filipino pop singer Christian Bautista covered the song for his self-titled debut album Christian Bautista in 2004.

== In popular culture ==
The song was used for the Michael and Julia characters on the American soap opera Santa Barbara.
