= Out of the Grey =

American Christian music duo

Out of the Grey is a husband-and-wife Contemporary Christian music project consisting of Scott and Christine Denté. Christine provides lead vocals, while Scott plays guitars and sings background, along with the occasional lead vocals. They have released seven studio albums, one best-of compilation and one live EP and have been involved in a number of other projects. Their debut album was ranked 47th in the book CCM Presents: The 100 Greatest Albums in Christian Music.

The couple released their seventh studio album, A Little Light Left on December 4, 2015, fourteen years after their sixth.

== Discography ==
=== Studio albums ===
- Out of the Grey (Sparrow Records, 1991)
- The Shape of Grace (Sparrow Records, 1992)
- Diamond Days (Sparrow Records, 1994)
- Gravity (Sparrow Records, 1995)
- (See Inside) (Sparrow Records, 1997)
- 6.1 (Rocketown Records, 2001)
- A Little Light Left (Independent, 2015)

=== EPs ===
- Limited Edition Live 12-6-2000 (Rocketown Records, 2001)

=== Compilations ===
- Remember This: The Out of the Grey Collection (Sparrow Records, 1998)
- The Early Years (Sparrow Records, 2006)

=== Songs on various-artists albums ===
==== Non-album tracks ====
- "Forever I Will Trust in You" and "Three Beautiful Words" on the album Coram Deo: In the Presence of God (1992)
- "Love Is The Only Power" and "Rejoice In Jesus," duet with Steve Green, on the album Coram Deo 2: People of Praise (1993)
- "The Way Of Love," duet with Charlie Peacock, on his album Full Circle: A Celebration of Songs and Friends (2004)
- "O Holy Night" on the Christmas album God With Us (1997)

==== Album tracks ====
- "The One I've Been Waiting For" on the album The Wedding Collection (1995)
- "When Love Comes to Life" on the album Wow 1996 (1996)
- "Disappear" on the album Wow 1998 (1998)
- "Waiting" on the Rocketown Records album Five (2001)
- "Grace, Mercy & Peace" on the album Hallejuahs: A Rocketown Worship Collection (2003)
- "Grace, Mercy & Peace" on the album Discover: Songs of Father (2007)
- "The Words" on the album Discover: Songs of Love (2007)

== Solo Projects ==
=== Christine Denté ===
==== Albums ====
- Along the Road (1994) with Margaret Becker and Susan Ashton
- Becoming (2003)
- Lost in Wonder: Voices of Worship (2005) with Susan Ashton and Michelle Tumes (Released in UK as Kisses from Heaven) (2004)
- Voyage: Journey of Prayer (2009)

==== Songs on various-artists albums ====
- "Rejoice in Jesus" with Steve Green and "Love is the Only Power" on the album "Coram Deo II: People of Praise" (1993)
- "O Thou Tellest Good Tidings to Zion," with Cindy Morgan and Susan Ashton, on the album Young Messiah (1993)
- "Breathe on Me" on the album Focus on the Family: Renewing the Heart (1997)
- "Constant" and "Nothing but the Blood" on the album Listen to Our Hearts Vol. 1 (1998)
- "We Cannot Hide It" on the album The Mercy Project (2000)
- "All the Ways of God" and "You Alone" on the album For Christ Alone (2004)
- "Prepare a Place," featuring Michael W. Smith, and "Christmas Kind of Feeling" on the Christmas album Gloria (2004)
- "Let the Earth Resound in Praise" and "My Heart Is Filled With Thankfulness" on the album The Apostles' Creed (2007)
- "Sure of All I Hope For" on the album Discover: Songs of Hope (2007)
- "Here I Am to Worship" on the album Worship for Women (2008)
- "Once Again" on the album Worship for the Evenings (2008)
- "Here I Am to Worship" and "How Loved Am I" on the album 50 Worship Anthems (2008)
- "When I'm Filled With Doubt and Fear" on the album The Worship Lounge (2008)
- "Stranger in My Skin" on iTunes single "Stranger In My Skin (As Heard On General Hospital)" (2009)

==== Guest appearances ====
- "Missing You," background vocals, on Amy Grant's album Behind the Eyes (1997)
- "A Violent Grace," duet with Michael Card, on his album Soul Anchor (2000)
- "He Is Here," duet with Brian Doerksen, on his album Holy God (2007)

=== Scott Denté ===
- Invention (1997) with Wes King and Phil Keaggy
- "Thru the Wood" on the McPherson Guitars sampler CD Sunset Drive

== See also ==
- Christian rock
