= The Raw & the Remix =

Remix album by Fine Young Cannibals
- Released: 11 December 1990
- Recorded: 1985–1990
- Genre: Electronica; house; pop rock
- Length: 58:57
- Label: I.R.S.; London; MCA
- Producer: Andy Cox; Roland Gift; David Rivkin; David Steele

Fine Young Cannibals chronology
The Raw & the Cooked (1989)	The Raw & the Remix (1990)	The Finest (1996)

The Raw & the Remix is a remix album by English alternative band Fine Young Cannibals, released in 1990 by I.R.S. Records, MCA Records and London Records. It contains remixes and alternate versions of songs by the band, mostly from their 1989 album The Raw & the Cooked. Several of the remixes were created by David Steele and Andy Cox of the band, whilst others were created by disc jockeys such as Smith & Mighty, Youth, Jazzie B, Nellee Hooper and Derrick May. The remixes on the album are said to be significantly different from the originals, some of which contain major stylistic differences in the arrangements.

Upon its release, the album only reached number 61 in the UK Albums Chart, becoming a relative commercial failure compared to previous releases, although it was still somewhat successful for a remix album with minimal promotion, and for a remix compilation, as its contents were previously released on the band's twelve-inch singles. The album received mixed to positive reviews from critics and was the band's final album before splitting up.

== Background ==
In 1989, the Fine Young Cannibals' soul and dance-influenced second album The Raw & the Cooked became a major international commercial and critical success, scoring two number 1 singles in the United States, "She Drives Me Crazy" and "Good Thing". The album itself also reached number 1 in the United Kingdom and United States. For the band's record labels I.R.S. Records and London Records, the album's success was unprecedented, and "they didn't know how to handle it." The band's third album was eagerly anticipated by their labels, who were hoping it to top the success the band had achieved in 1989.

Nonetheless, by late 1990, nearly two years had passed since the band released The Raw & the Cooked, and there was no new album by the band in sight. The band were infamous for their "sluggardly production pace", owing to how three years had passed between their first two albums, and as The Raw & the Cooked was a major success, there was still big anticipation for new music by the band. Inspired by these factors, the band's record label, I.R.S. Records, took this an opportunity to release a remix album of the band's material as a "stop gap" between the band's albums. Remixes of the band's material, most of which were gathered on the remix album, were released as B-sides to their 1989 singles.

== Content ==
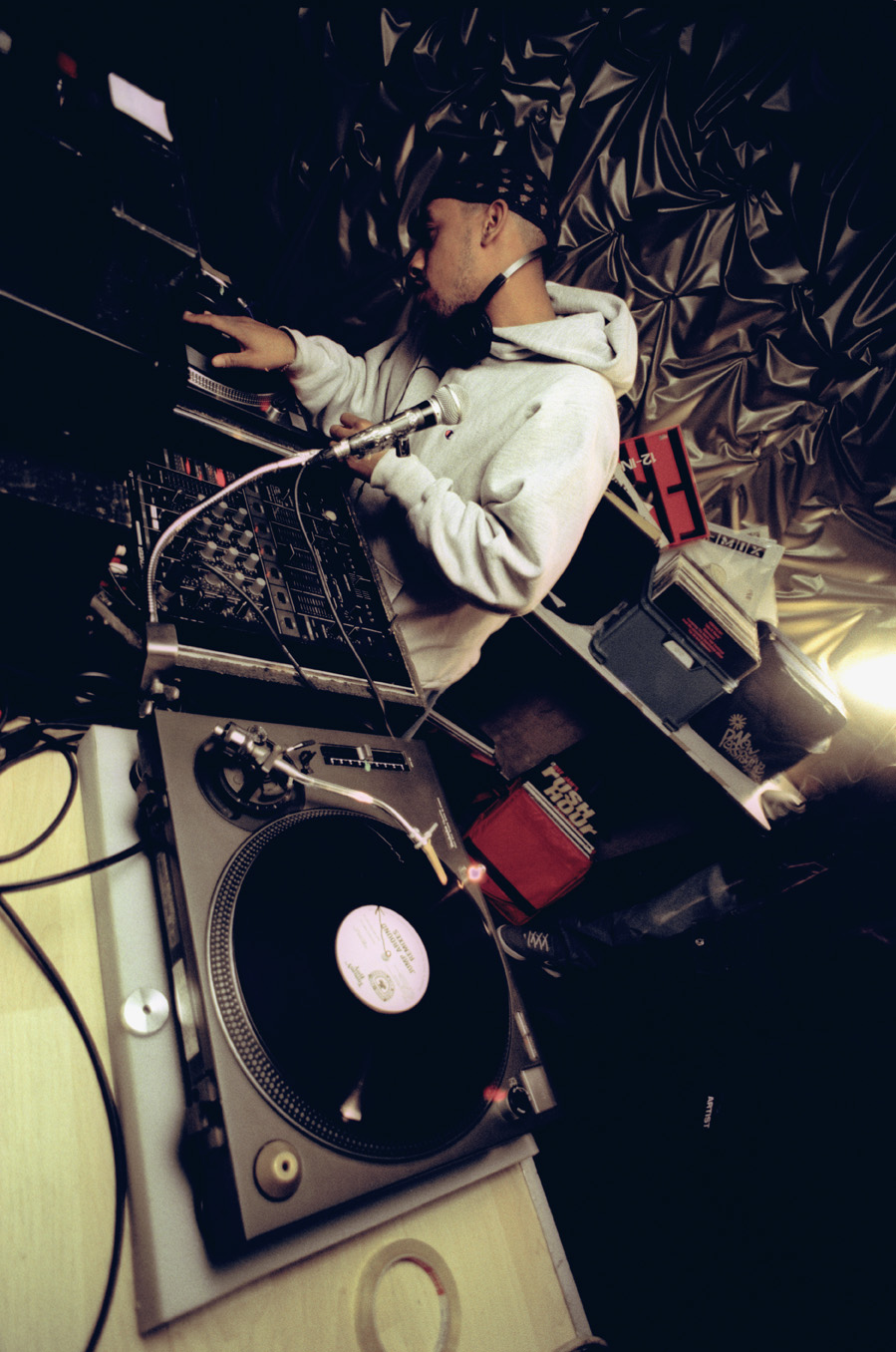
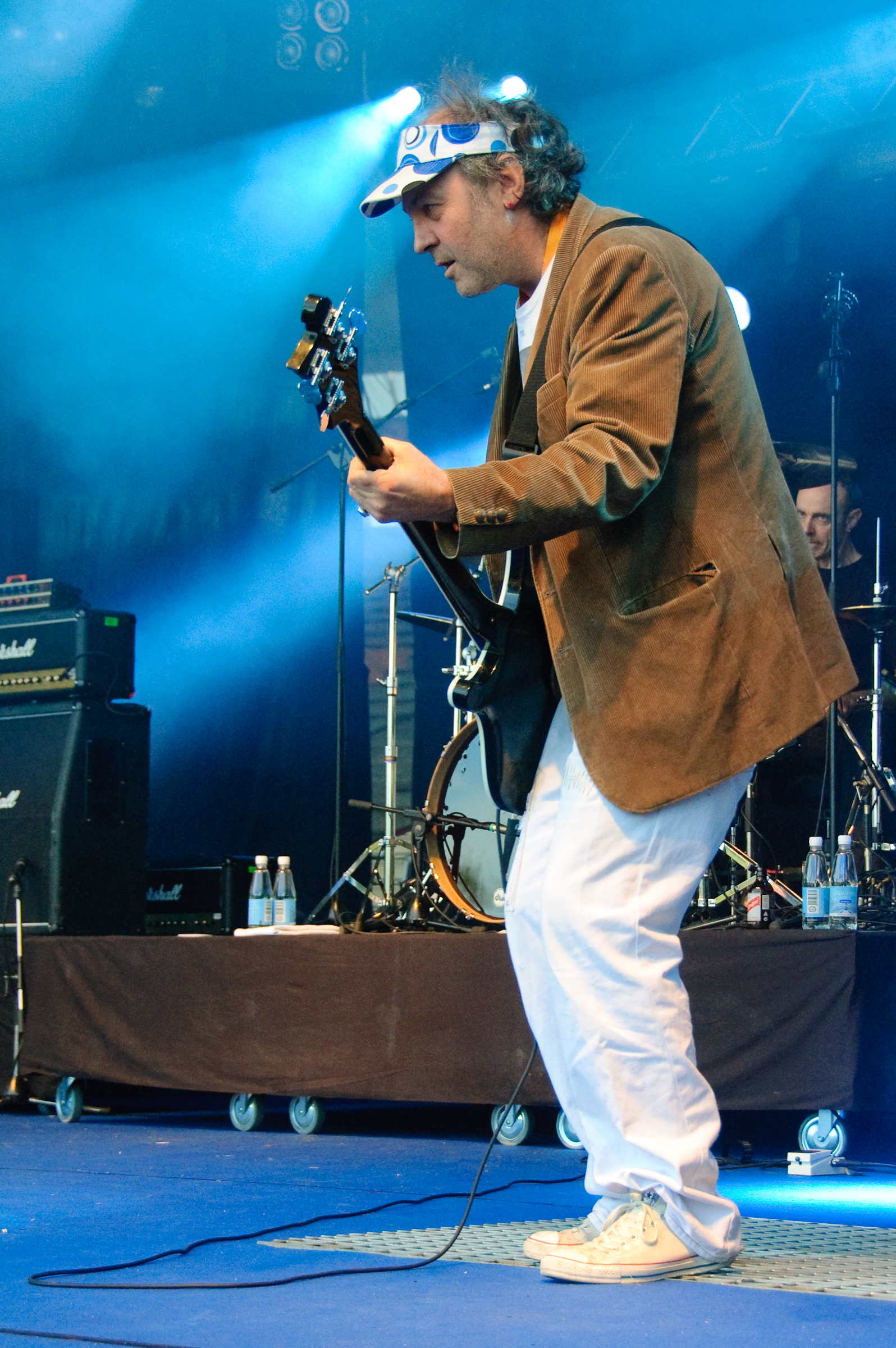
Prince Paul (left) and Youth (right) were amongst those contributing remixes to the album.

For The Raw & the Remix, I.R.S. compiled numerous 12-inch remixes of the band's songs, most of which were from The Raw & the Cooked, and all of which are considered dance floor friendly. The 59 minute collection features "significant variations" of the original versions of the band's songs, some of which add raps, such as Monie Love's guest appearance on the second remix of "She Drives Me Crazy", which itself was by David Steele and Andy Cox of the band, and numerous "major stylistic arrangements", such as the "dub dissection" on Smith & Mighty's remix of "I'm Not the Man I Used to Be", and the "Soul II Soul stamp" on the other remix of the song by Jazzie B and Nellee Hooper. Three of the band's biggest hits, "I'm Not the Man I Used to Be", "She Drives Me Crazy" and "I'm Not Satisfied", appear twice on the album in different remixes.

Besides the aforementioned David Steele, Andy Cox, Smith & Mighty, Nelle Hooper and Jazzie B, remixes on the album are also contributed by David Z, Prince Paul, Matt Dike, Steve Thompson, Derrick May, Michael Barbiero and Youth. The LP version of the album only contains ten tracks, whereas CD and cassette editions feature two further remixes, including techno innovator Derrick May's "Mayhem Rhythm Remix" of "Tired of Getting Pushed Around," the sole single by Cox and Steele's side-project acid house band Two Men, a Drum Machine and a Trumpet, which was a Top 20 hit in the UK in 1988. This is one of two remixes on the album not created using material from The Raw & the Cooked, the other being "The Mix With No Beard" of "Johnny Come Home", a song from the band's eponymous 1985 debut album.

The material on the album had already been released on the band's twelve-inch singles, although many of the remixes are edited from the original versions released on the singles, namely "She Drives Me Crazy (The Monie Love Remix)", "It's OK (It's Alright) (Ploeg Club Mix)" and "Tired of Getting Pushed Around (The Mayhem Rhythm Remix)". Furthermore, the "Smith & Mighty Version" of "I'm Not the Man I Used to Be" is an edit of the song's original "12" Mellow Mix", and numerous other remixes on the albums are renamed from the originals, such as the "Extended Version" of "Don't Look Back", which is renamed the "12" Version".

== Release and reception ==
Professional ratings
Review scores
Source	Rating
AllMusic	2/5 stars
Encyclopedia of Popular Music	3/5 stars
New Musical Express	6/10
Select	4/5 stars
Trouser Press	(positive)

The Raw & the Remix was released on 11 December 1990; in the United Kingdom, it was released by London Records and in a separate edition by MCA Records, whilst in the United States, it was released by I.R.S. Records and MCA. The original London Records UK edition featured a slightly different artwork than those used on the MCA Records UK edition and American editions. The booklet features four flaps which can be folded out to create a cross. The band's abbreviated name, FYC, is used throughout the packaging instead of the band's full name; the abbreviation was introduced in 1989 in order to make the band more marketable and in order not to alienate those put off by the usage of the term "cannibals" in the band name, and although The Raw & the Cooked and its singles featured both the band's full name and FYC abbreviation, The Raw & the Remix is the band's only release to feature the abbreviation alone.

The album was not a commercial success, debuting and peaking at number 61 on the UK Albums Chart and only staying on the chart for one week. Writer Steve Binnie, in his 2014 book The Sound of the Crowd, described the album as having "limped" to its chart position. Though this was a relative failure compared to the number one peak achieved by The Raw & the Cooked, the remix album is still seen as a mild success when its near lack of promotion and status as a remix compilation of previously released mixes is taken into consideration.

The album has received mixed to positive reviews from music critics. Trouser Press praised the album, singling out the "danceable overhauls" and "significant variations." In the Encyclopedia of Popular Music, writer Colin Larkin rated the album three stars out of five. William Ruhlmann of Allmusic only rated the album two stars out of five, suggesting that although the remixes may sound good on a dance floor, "off the dance floor, none of this improves on the originals." Pop Rescue said the album was successful in bringing the band to a wider audience. In his book Rhythm and Noise: An Aesthetics of Rock (1996), writer Theodore Gracyk described the album as a great example of remix albums being released at the time with "intention to produce something that is to be treated as a distinct work, usually signaled by the fact that the remix is given a separate title." He described the album as containing "radically revamped versions of earlier tracks." BMG Music Service included the album in their "Best of the '80s" list in a 1997 issue of Spin magazine.

Although The Raw & the Remix was only intended as a "stop gap" in the band's career, it was ultimately the last album before the band split-up due to being tired of being a band, although in 1996, the band briefly reunited to record a new song, "The Flame", for their 1996 compilation album The Finest, after which they disbanded permanently. When The Raw & the Cooked was remastered and re-released in 2013 in a deluxe edition featuring numerous bonus tracks, the opportunity was taken to include some of the remixes that feature on The Raw & the Remix, although not every remix from the album is featured, as "Edsel were never going to be able to include everything."

== Track listing ==
No.	Title	Length
1.	"She Drives Me Crazy (David Z 12" Version)" (remix by David Z.)	7:04
2.	"I'm Not Satisfied (New York Rap Version)" (remix by N. Bowie)	3:59
3.	"Good Thing" (12" version)	4:37
4.	"Johnny Come Home (The Mix with No Beard)" (remix by Mark Moore, James Reynolds)	4:46
5.	"I'm Not the Man I Used to Be (Jazzie B & Nellee Hooper Version)" (remix by Nellee Hooper, Jazzie B)	4:40
6.	"She Drives Me Crazy (The Monie Love Remix)" (remix by Andy Cox, David Steele)	4:54
7.	"I'm Not Satisfied (Matt Dike Remix)" (remix by Matt Dike)	4:36
8.	"It's OK (It's Alright)" (Ploeg Club Mix)	4:34
9.	"I'm Not the Man I Used to Be (Smith & Mighty Version)" (remix by Smith & Mighty)	4:37
10.	"Johnny Takes a Trip"	5:01
11.	"Tired of Getting Pushed Around (The Mayhem Rhythm Remix)" (remix by Derrick May)	4:01
12.	"Don't Look Back (12" Version)" (remix by Michael Barbiero, Steve Thompson, Youth, Steele/Cox)	5:52
