= The Finest (Fine Young Cannibals album) =

Greatest hits album by Fine Young Cannibals
- Released: 11 November 1996
- Genre: Pop rock
- Length: 51:25
- Label: MCA (U.S.); London/FFRR (UK)
- Producer: Andy Cox; Dave Cox; Lamont Dozier; Roland Gift; Jerry Harrison; Robin Miller; David Steele

Fine Young Cannibals chronology
The Raw & the Remix (1990)	The Finest (1996)	Greatest Hits (2004)

Professional ratings
Review scores
Source	Rating
AllMusic	4.5/5 stars
Entertainment Weekly	B+
Melody Maker	(favorable)
Q	4/5 stars
Robert Christgau	A−
Tom Hull – on the Web	A−

The Finest is a greatest hits album by British rock band Fine Young Cannibals, released in 1996 by London Records (under the FFRR brand name) and licensed in the United States to MCA Records. It includes tracks from the band's two studio albums Fine Young Cannibals (1985) and The Raw & the Cooked (1989), plus a track from the film Something Wild and three new tracks. "The Flame" was released as an accompanying single, making number 17 in the UK chart.

The album's cover art was created by Anton Corbijn. It has sold 600,000 copies worldwide, excluding the United States.

== Track listing ==
All tracks written by Roland Gift and David Steele, except where noted.

No.	Title	Writer(s)	Length
1.	"She Drives Me Crazy" (from The Raw & the Cooked, 1989)		3:36
2.	"The Flame" (previously unreleased)		3:51
3.	"Johnny Come Home" (from Fine Young Cannibals, 1985)		3:36
4.	"Good Thing" (from The Raw & the Cooked)		3:22
5.	"Suspicious Minds" (from Fine Young Cannibals)	Mark James	3:58
6.	"Blue" (from Fine Young Cannibals)	Gift; Steele; Andy Cox	3:32
7.	"Ever Fallen in Love (With Someone You Shouldn't've)" (from Something Wild soundtrack, 1986)	Pete Shelley	3:54
8.	"Don't Look Back" (from The Raw & the Cooked)		3:40
9.	"Tell Me What" (from The Raw & the Cooked)		2:47
10.	"I'm Not the Man I Used to Be" (from The Raw & the Cooked)		4:19
11.	"Couldn't Care More" (from Fine Young Cannibals)		3:31
12.	"Funny How Love Is" (from Fine Young Cannibals)	Gift; Steele; Cox	3:30
13.	"Take What I Can Get" (previously unreleased)	Lamont Dozier; Steele	4:15
14.	"Since You've Been Gone" (previously unreleased)		3:40

== Charts ==
=== Weekly charts ===
Chart (1996)	Peak position
Austrian Albums (Ö3 Austria)	22
Belgian Albums (Ultratop Flanders)	39
German Albums (Offizielle Top 100)	47
New Zealand Albums (RMNZ)	21
Scottish Albums (OCC)	12
UK Albums (OCC)	10

=== Year-end charts ===
Chart (1996)	Position
UK Albums (OCC)	46

== Certifications ==
Region	Certification	Certified units/sales
United Kingdom (BPI)	Platinum	300,000^{^}
^{^} Shipments figures based on certification alone.
