= The Raw & the Cooked (album) =

1989 studio album by Fine Young Cannibals

Studio album by Fine Young Cannibals
- Released: 13 January 1989
- Recorded: 1986–1988
- Studios: AIR, London; Paisley Park, Chanhassen
- Genres: Alternative rock; new wave; soul; dance-rock
- Length: 35:49
- Labels: I.R.S.; London
- Producers: Fine Young Cannibals; Jerry Harrison; David Z

Fine Young Cannibals chronology
Fine Young Cannibals (1985)	The Raw & the Cooked (1989)	The Raw & the Remix (1990)

Singles from The Raw & the Cooked
- 1. "She Drives Me Crazy" Released: December 1988; 2. "Good Thing" Released: 3 April 1989; 3. "Don't Look Back" Released: 7 August 1989; 4. "I'm Not the Man I Used to Be" Released: November 1989; 5. "I'm Not Satisfied" Released: 8 February 1990; 6. "It's OK (It's Alright)" Released: October 1990 (Germany); 7. "Tell Me What" Released: December 1996 (France)

The Raw & the Cooked is the second and final studio album by British rock band Fine Young Cannibals, released in 1989. The title of the album was lifted from the book of the same name (Le Cru et le Cuit in French) by French anthropologist Claude Lévi-Strauss. Four songs from the album first appeared in film soundtracks in the mid-1980s, three of which were soul tracks from the Tin Men film. The band had already recorded over half of the album by the time David Z came to produce the remainder. His work with the band, which resulted in dance-rock material, included studio experimentation.

The album is considered to be an eclectic, varied album, taking influences from numerous genres including Motown soul, rock, funk, British beat and pop. Released in 1989 by London Records and I.R.S. Records, The Raw & the Cooked was a major commercial success, selling over three million copies. Numerous singles were released from the album, including the two US number-one singles "She Drives Me Crazy" and "Good Thing". The album was critically acclaimed. Jo-Ann Greene of AllMusic called the album a masterpiece and one of the 1980s' most exciting albums. The Raw & the Remix, a remix album composed primarily of songs from The Raw & the Cooked, was released in 1990.

== Background and recording ==
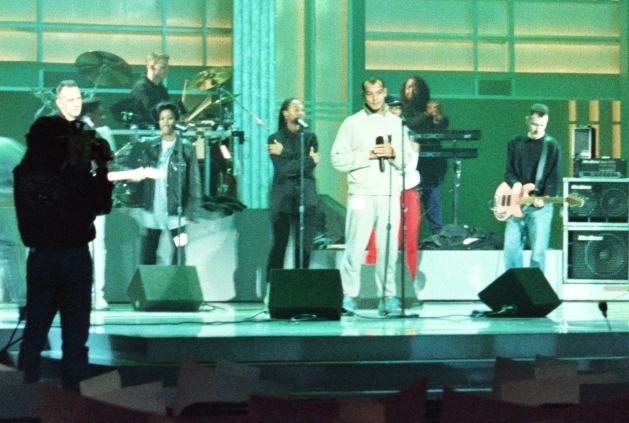
Fine Young Cannibals in 1990.

Multiple songs from The Raw & the Cooked debuted long before their release on the album; the band's cover of Buzzcocks' "Ever Fallen in Love (With Someone You Shouldn't've)" originally appeared on the soundtrack for the 1986 Jonathan Demme film Something Wild. Three other songs from the album—"Good Thing", "Tell Me What" and "As Hard as It Is"—first appeared in the 1987 film Tin Men, where the Fine Young Cannibals portrayed a band in a nightclub. These three songs have a retro-soul style consistent with the film's 1963 Baltimore setting. At this point, the band were beginning to move away from their "Sixties soul sound", but Tin Men director Barry Levinson persuaded the band to retain the sound on the songs. With these songs, the band had already written and recorded enough songs for one half of the album between their contributions to the two films.

While the band were slowly recording the album, they had spent the period so far focusing on side-projects as a result of an unofficial semi-hiatus following their 1985 debut album Fine Young Cannibals. Vocalist Roland Gift took to his acting career, filmed highlighted dramatic roles in such films as Sammy and Rosie Get Laid (1987) and Scandal (filmed in 1988, released 1989). The rest of the band, David Steele and Andy Cox, however, formed the side-project duo Two Men, a Drum Machine and a Trumpet, an acid house-inspired project which was described as "high-tech" and "danceable." In December 1987, they released the single "Tired of Getting Pushed Around" on Fine Young Cannibals' label I.R.S. Records, and it reached number 18 in the United Kingdom. Nonetheless, Fine Young Cannibals reconvened soon afterwards to focus their attention on writing and recording the remainder of The Raw & the Cooked.

Although the band had self-produced the album so far, the band's label MCA Records asked the band to find another producer for the second phase of recording. The band initially considered Latin Rascals and Gil Evans but eventually asked MCA to approach Prince to produce tracks to complete the album. As Prince was unavailable, the label countered with producer David Z, who had worked with Prince and is the older brother of Bobby Z. of The Revolution. The band and David Z recorded three tracks together at Paisley Park Studios, Prince's studio in Minnesota, United States, to complete the album, including the hits "She Drives Me Crazy" and "I'm Not Satisfied". David Z recalled that "they wanted to work with Prince for their next record. They were told that Prince doesn't work with anybody that way, as a producer-for-hire. But they were also told there was someone who works with Prince who does. That was me, and they were willing to try it out."

MCA suggested that the band record the tracks they wished to create with David Z at Paisley Park Studios so that they "would have no choice but to work and get the record done", after the label told David Z in a meeting that the band, "then living in London, had been taking an unusually long time between their first and second records." Though the band were polarized by their stay in Minneapolis, with the locals' "big and blonde" looks contrasting with their own "shaved heads" and "punk attitudes," the band's pre-production process, which "consisted of sending songs back and forth for consideration", was very efficient. David Z had prompted the band to rewrite the original version of "She Drives Me Crazy", which was then called "She's My Baby", into the final version.

=== Production ===
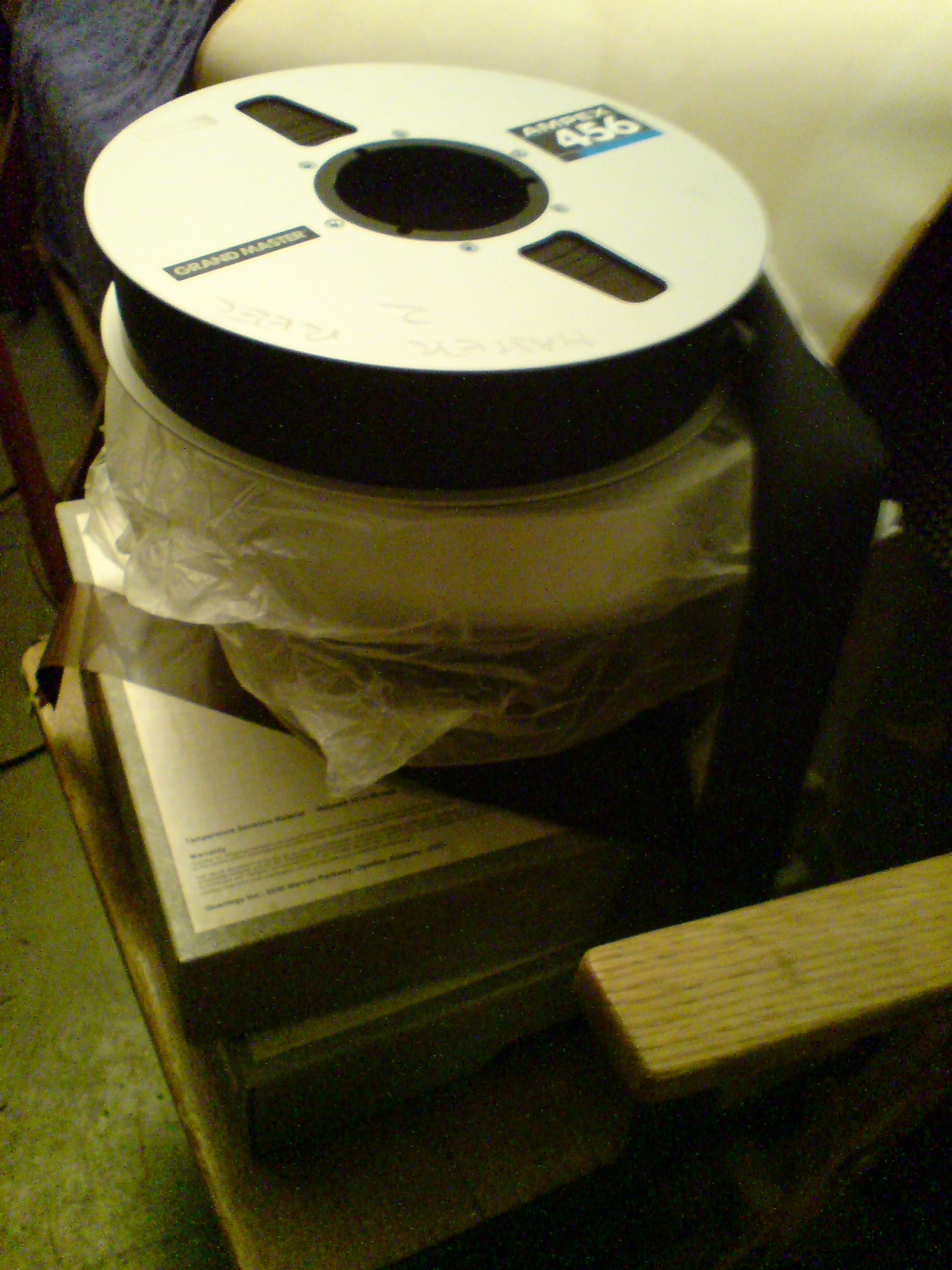
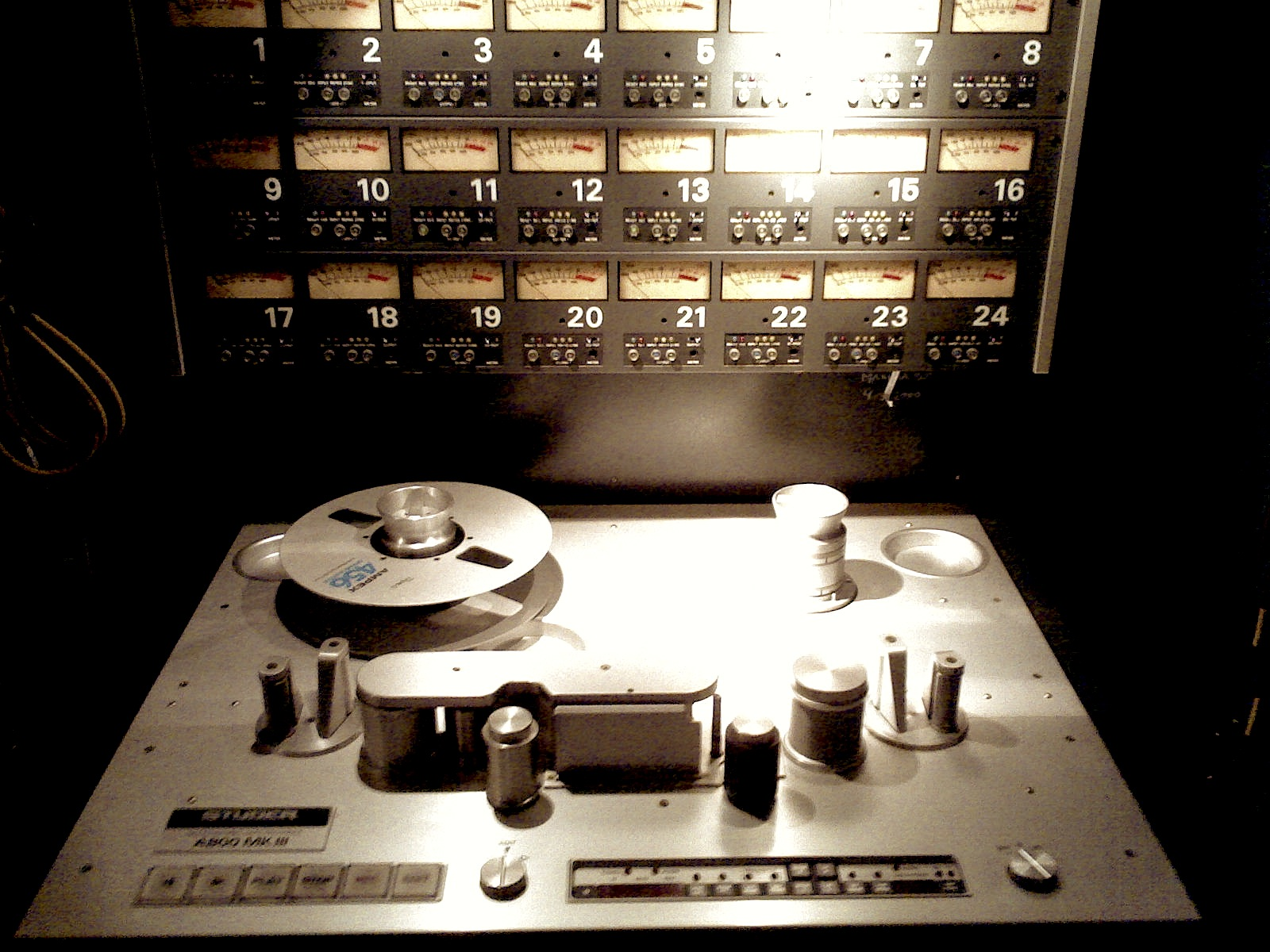
The snare sound in "She Drives Me Crazy" was run through a roll of Ampex 456 multitrack tape (left) running through a Studer A800 multitrack recorder (right) at 15 ips.

Unlike the band's self-titled debut album, Fine Young Cannibals' recording approach on The Raw & the Cooked was more experimental. They worked with breakbeat drum loops on occasion, including sampling James Brown's "Funky Drummer" on "I'm Not the Man I Used to Be". Furthermore, the unique snare drum "pop" sound on "She Drives Me Crazy" was created by David Z recording the snare drum portion separately. A speaker was then placed on top of the snare drum, and a microphone below. The original recording of the snare drum part was played back through the speaker and re-recorded. Reflecting on creating the snare sound with Mix in 2001, David Z said: "I took the head off a snare drum and started whacking it with a wooden ruler, recording it through a Shure 57 microphone. As I did that, I started twisting the hell out of the [API 550] EQ around 1 kHz on it, to the point where it was starting to sound more like a crash. I blended that with a snare I found in the Linn itself, which was a 12-bit machine, so it sounded pretty edgy to start with." Dan Daley of the website added:

But the coup de grace for the sound was when Z pumped the processed and blended sample through an Auratone speaker set upside down atop another snare drum, which rattled the metal snares and gave the result some ambience and even more high end. The whole thing was limited slightly and then sent to a track on a roll of Ampex 456 running on a Studer A800 at 15 ips. Only a slight amount of reverb was added to the track later on. The sonic result was closer to a hollow wood block sound than any snare found on a conventional rock record, and in becoming, along with Gift's vocals, the signature of the song, it would go on to have many lives of its own subsequent to the single's run up the charts.

Also given complex treatment on the track were the "staccato single-note lines" of the guitars, which "were actually layered six deep, with a few chords thrown in here and there. Some of the lines and chords were actually recorded only once, then manually triggered from a sampler during playback and mixing. One of the lines was also played back through an underwater pool-type speaker Z had laying around, then re-recorded to tape, giving it a muted, mysterious quality that no onboard or outboard EQ could mimic;" David Z stated that "what really made the guitars stand out, though, was that as Andy [Cox] was playing to chord parts, I was slowly twisting the EQ from one extreme to the other, giving it this wah effect, so every part on the record has a very individual and unique sound. But there aren't many parts at all, so the space between them becomes part of the sound." David Z and the band denied the label's bother that the vocals were mixed too low, with David Z recalling "we just said go and listen to a Rolling Stones record, and let us know how far the vocals are up front on that."

== Lyrics and vocals ==
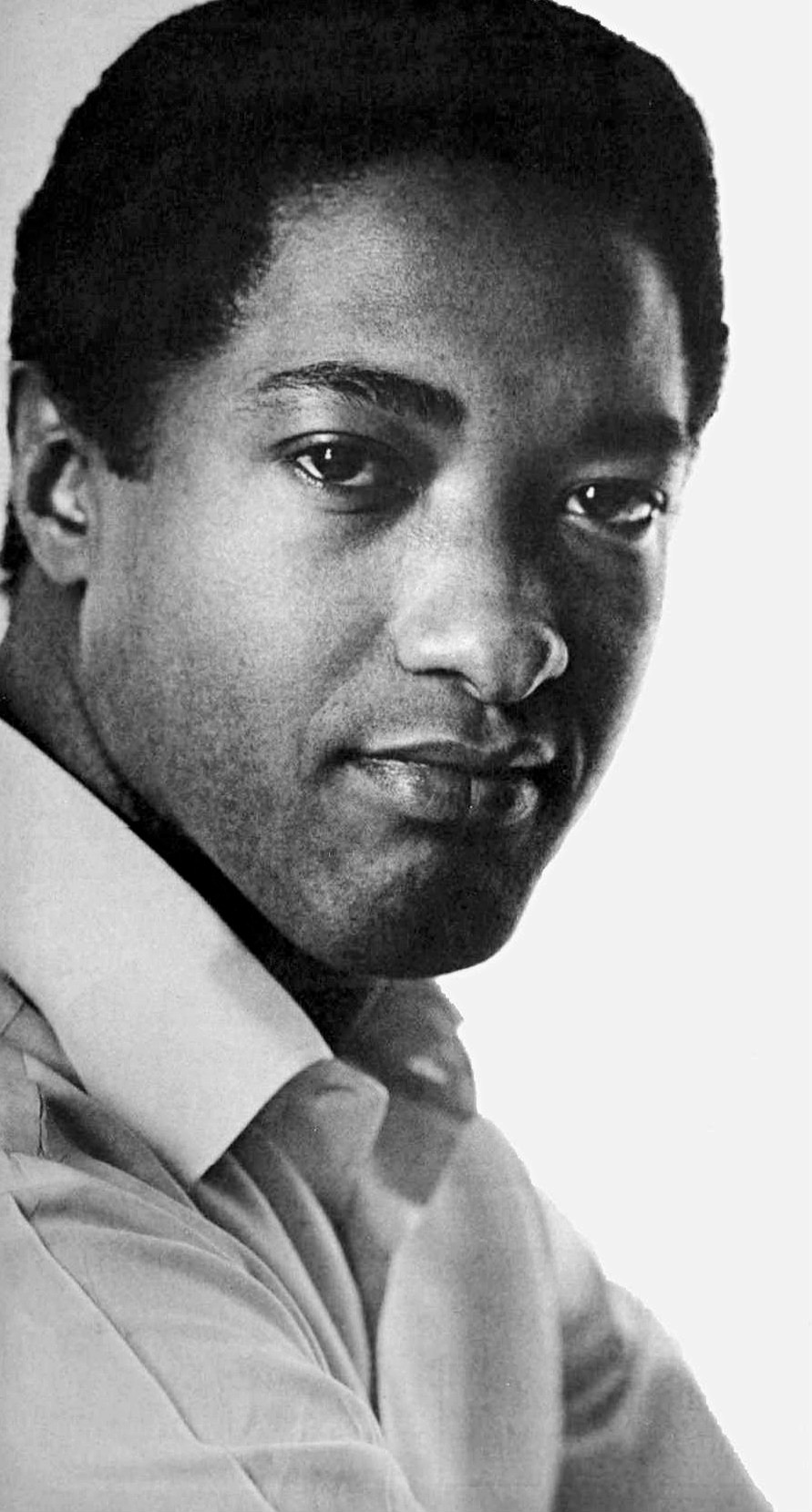
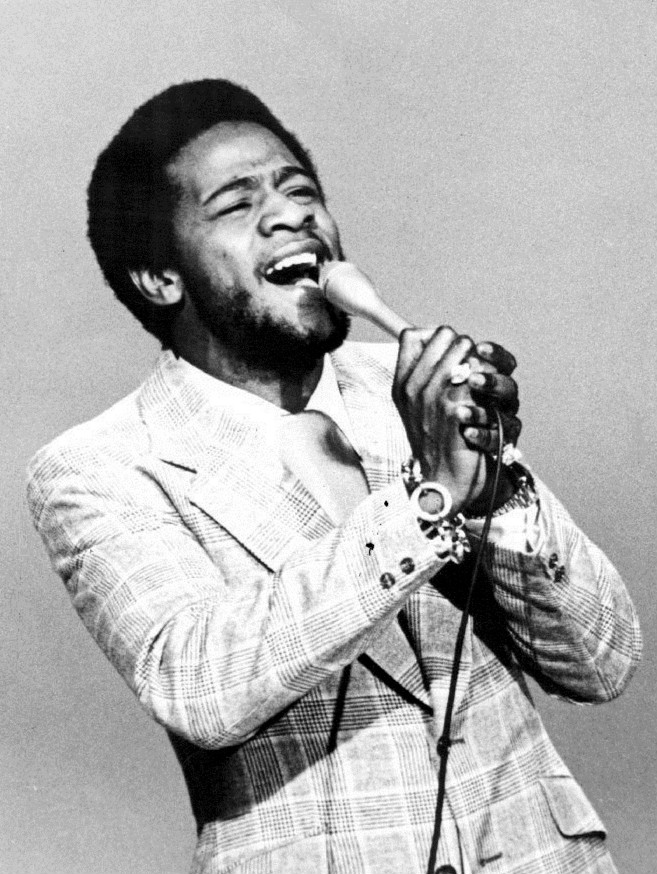
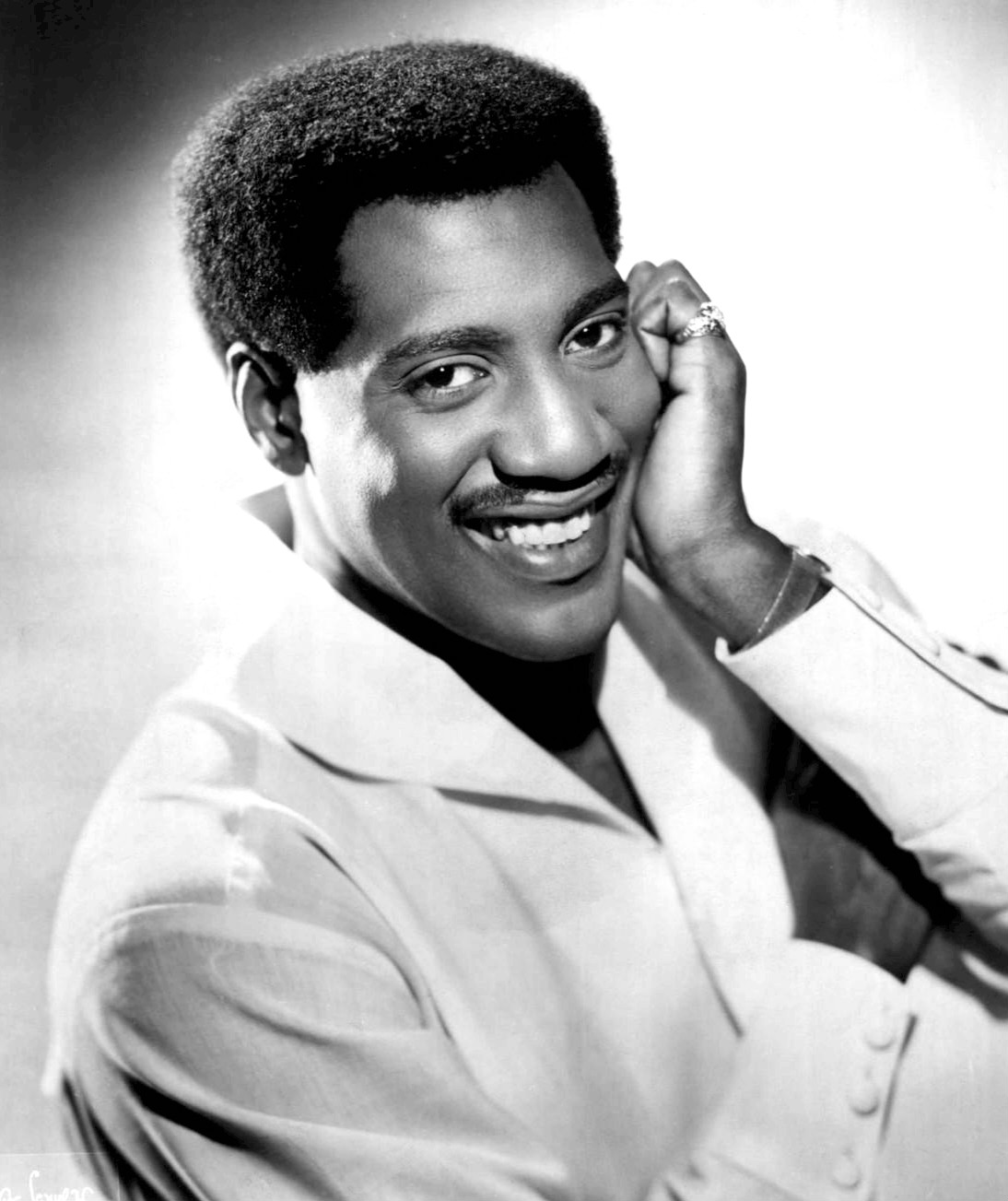
Comparisons were drawn between Roland Gift's voice and those of Sam Cooke, Al Green and Otis Redding.

A departure from the political lyrics of Fine Young Cannibals' first album, the songs on The Raw & the Cooked concern romantic and longing themes such as love, regret and loss. These have been described as "traditional soul themes" by Los Angeles Times critic Steve Hochman, in keeping in with the album's soul tributes, and also as pop music by Robert Christgau of The Village Voice, who stated that "the content of these songs seem to concern romantic love. That makes them pop. I can also tell you that I don't much care if I know what they're about or not. That makes them good pop." In Colin Larkin's The Encyclopedia of Popular Music, the album is described as "featuring cultivated soul ballads to complement further material of a politically direct nature." Spin journalist Peter Johnson said that it contains "almost vacant lyrics" which "still sound compelling." With the exception of the cover of Buzzcocks' "Ever Fallen in Love", Roland Gift and David Steele wrote all the songs on the album, with Andy Cox also credited as co-writing "It's OK (It's Alright)". Gift's "catchy" and soulful falsetto voice has been compared to Mick Jagger's voice on the Rolling Stones albums Black and Blue (1976) and Tattoo You (1981), as well as the voices of soul singers such as Sam Cooke, Al Green and Otis Redding. Gift's voice was noted for being particularly emotive on "I'm Not Satisfied".

"She Drives Me Crazy" was originally written as "She's My Baby" until David Z encouraged the band to rewrite the song; David Z stated that "'She's My Baby' is kind of a nebulous sentiment—it's something you say, but it doesn't hit home. 'She Drives Me Crazy'—now there's something that every guy in the world has said at least once in his life with conviction." Johnson said that, unusually for a love song, it is "neither specific nor evocative, and finds Gift chiming 'cuckoo, cuckoo' in counterpoint with himself." "Good Thing" describes a departing lover, whilst "I'm Not the Man I Used to Be" is a torch song that has been described as "torrid." "I'm Not Satisfied" depicts a man who criticizes the weekends for being too short, his girlfriend for being too possessive, and the city for being too depressing. Gift sings in a lower register on "As Hard as It Is" than on other songs.

== Music ==
The Raw & the Cooked combines a variety of styles and genres in keeping in with the band's vision of "tying past and present musical styles into artful new pop packages." Cox himself lightheartedly referred to the album as "thirty years' worth of pop music in thirty minutes." Jo-Ann Greene of AllMusic stated the album presents very diverse rhythms, most of which are constructed synthetically, and "a shopping list of genres" where "mod, funk, Motown, British beat, R&B, punk, rock, and even disco are embedded within the songs". In Metro Weekly, Chris Gerard noted of its diverse directions: "the funky pop that David Z helped contribute is a far cry from the old-school R&B of the Tin Men tracks." Whilst known for its eclectic array of styles, the album is also generally seen as a tribute to various different styles of American soul music in particular. Robert Christgau deemed it a pop album in that it features "mostly admittedly quite hooky" beats and "vocal ID", in addition to multiple hooks and melodies. Trouser Press said that the album is a "crafty" combination of Motown soul and dance-rock, while Martin C. Strong described it as "potpourri of pop styles and genres, with either Northern soul or Motown at the helm."

The album is split into two-halves which match together disparate styles; the "Raw" side, which features "references to Sam Cooke, the Supremes and doo-wop", and the more polished "Cooked" side, which references "Prince and up-to-the-second dance beats", according to Rob Tannenbaum of Rolling Stone. The "Raw" half is said to be more reminiscent of the band's debut album than the "Cooked" side. Despite the album being categorized as new wave in American record shops, the album's eclectic scope is said to reflect "the clashes of tastes" within the band, who all had varied taste in music. Concerning dance music and their incorporation of the genre, Cox said that "the dance-music thing is like the punk of the Eighties, rock & roll in the Fifties. It seems to be the thing that is the most vibrant part of modern music."

=== Structure ===
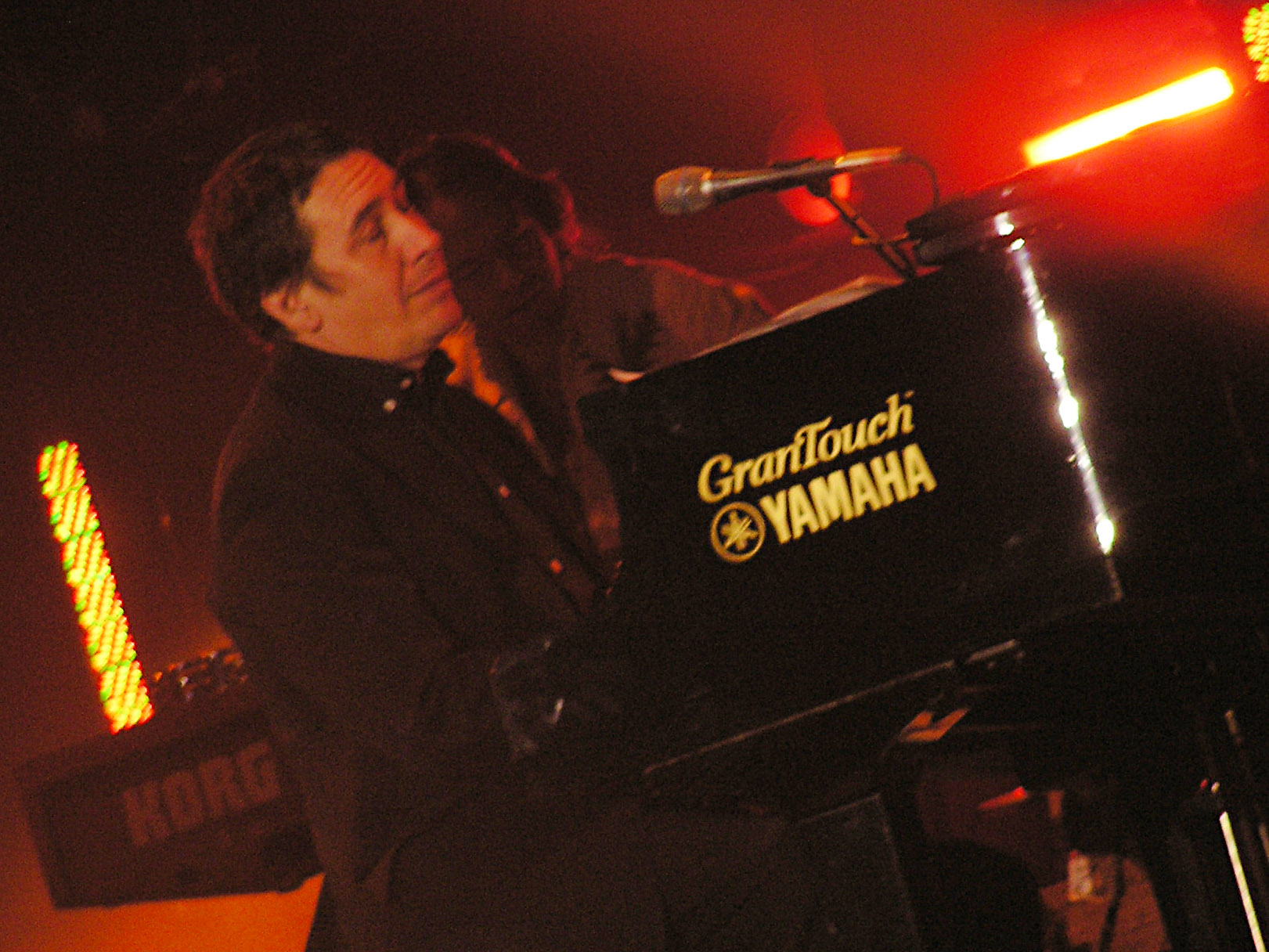
Jools Holland played the piano solo on "Good Thing".

Musically, "She Drives Me Crazy" has been described as emphasising the space between its separate parts, with these parts "all designed to be tight and funk-like in their precision," albeit with rock-edged sounds, including the distorted guitar which operates as a counterpoint to "the vocal melody and Gift's floating falsetto." Jo-Ann Greene said the song contains "the most unique, and instantly identifiable, beat/riff combination of the decade." "Good Thing" is the band's tribute to the northern soul all-nighter parties of the 1960s and 1970s, and was referred to by AllMusic's Dave Thompson as "arguably the apotheosis of the Cannibals's hybrid sound." It features a choppy rhythm, and is constructed around a "slinky R&B riff" which is further aided by a boogie-woogie piano and "slammed home with a cracking beat." Jools Holland played the piano on the track, noting that it was "one of the biggest selling records I've ever played on".

"I'm Not the Man I Used to Be" contains keyboards, finger-picked guitar and a prominent, looped sample of the breakbeat from James Brown's "Funky Drummer". Greene described the song as having "a futuristic jungle beat and an almost housey production," while Rob Tannenbaum said the song "puts a Kangol hat and Adidas shoes on Marvin Gaye." "Tell Me What" is said to accurately approximate the Tamla Motown sound, albeit with a "modern touch" courtesy of its synthesiser. The doo-wop harmonies in the song are said to evoke the music of the 1950s. "Don't Look Back" was influenced by 1960s jangle pop pioneers The Byrds, "while a touch of mid-Sixties Beatles-styled riffing adds further glamor". "Don't Let It Get You Down" is a funk and acid house song which contains a trumpet solo; Tannenbaum believed that the combination of acid house and a trumpet solo was perhaps the first in history. The downtempo "As Hard as It Is" is a danceable soul song. Thompson said that, accompanying Gift's soulful vocals, "it's a stunning performance that the rest of the band deftly back with moody synths, insistent beats, a bassline that thrums with its own pain, and the moodiest of brass solos." The cover of "Ever Fallen in Love" is dancehall-tinged.

== Release ==
The Raw & the Cooked was released in January 1989 by London Records in Europe and I.R.S. Records in the US. The title of the album was lifted from the book of the same name ("Le Cru et le Cuit" in French) by French anthropologist Claude Lévi-Strauss. In effort to appear marketable and in order not to alienate those put off by the usage of the term "cannibals" in the band name, the band often adopted the abbreviation FYC in this era, and the "FYC" logo dwarves the band's full name on the album cover and on its singles. The band made numerous concert and television appearances to promote the album, touring the US in September and October 1989. Gift appeared on a David Letterman chat show and performed "She Drives Me Crazy" with the show's house band; Gift later used this as an example of how the band's songs "sound completely different" in the hands of others, saying "it just sounds just so different even when it's the same music and the same arrangement. It's the people that make up the group. It's like Gestalt."

A major commercial success, largely spurred on by the success of its first few singles, The Raw & the Cooked reached number one in at least five different countries: the US, the UK, where it stayed on the UK Albums Chart for 66 weeks, Canada, Australia, and Austria. Although it reached number one in most of those countries in early 1989, it did not reach number one on the US Billboard 200 until July 1989 on the back of the momentum gathered by "Good Thing". It spent seven weeks at the top, replacing Like a Prayer by Madonna and being replaced by Batman by Prince. In the UK, The Raw & the Cooked was certified three times platinum by the British Phonographic Industry (BPI) for at least sales of 900,000, whilst it was certified six times platinum in Canada for at least sales of 600,000 and, in the US, two times platinum by the Recording Industry Association of America (RIAA) for sales of at least two million copies. The album has sold over three million copies worldwide. The Raw & the Cooked was remastered and re-released by Edsel Records on 25 February 2013 in a deluxe edition featuring numerous bonus tracks and an entire bonus disc.

=== Singles ===
Although "Ever Fallen in Love" was already released as a single in 1986 to promote the Something Wild soundtrack, reaching number nine on the UK Singles Chart, and number 19 on the German Singles Chart, "She Drives Me Crazy" was released as the official lead single in December 1988, a month before the album, with two music videos, the most notable of which was the triple VMA-nominated directed by Philippe Decouflé which featured performers in unusual costumes, including two identical dancers with completely different coloured-outfits, as well as a person with a television on their head, bearing similarities to Decouflé's only other music video, that of New Order's "True Faith".

The crossover success of "She Drives Me Crazy" in the US was considered unusual; initially, the song was only successful on college radio and alternative radio, following in the footsteps of "Suspicious Minds" and "Johnny Come Home" from the band's first album; however, the song soon became very popular on urban radio, "in between Bobby Brown and Tone-Lōc." Rob Tannenbaum said that, in doing so, "the Cannibals achieved the rare trick of bridging these two formats as a result of the transitions that took place in the band between albums." The song's multi-format compatibility and MTV airplay ultimately landed the single at number one in the US in mid-April where it resided for one week. The song also reached number one in Australia, Austria, Canada, New Zealand, and Spain, and number five on the UK Singles Chart.

"Good Thing" was released as the second single on 3 April 1989. It was another number-one single in the US and Canada, and also reached number seven in Australia and the UK and number four in New Zealand and Ireland, "Don't Look Back", released on 7 August 1989, reached number 11 in the US, number 38 in Australia and number 34 in the UK, whilst fourth single "I'm Not the Man I Used to Be", released in November 1989, spent eight weeks on the UK Singles Chart, peaking at number 20. whilst also reaching the top 30 in Austria and the Netherlands, and number 54 in the US. "I'm Not Satisfied" was released as the fifth single on 8 February 1990 and reached number 46 in the UK and number 90 in the US. In October 1990, the sixth single, "It's OK (It's Alright)", reached number 44 in Germany, and in December 1996, "Tell Me What" was released in France but did not chart.

== Critical reception ==
Professional ratings
Review scores
Source	Rating
AllMusic	4.5/5 stars
Classic Pop	4/5 stars
Los Angeles Times	4/4 stars
Mojo	4/5 stars
Q	4/5 stars
Record Collector	4/5 stars
Rolling Stone	4/5 stars
The Rolling Stone Album Guide	4.5/5 stars
Uncut	7/10
The Village Voice	A−

The Raw & the Cooked was well received by critics. Steve Hochman, writing for the Los Angeles Times, deemed it a "sophomore opus" which "just may be the best tribute to and update of American soul styles from England since the Rolling Stones' Black and Blue or side 2 of Tattoo You." He said that "as much as the trio may borrow from Motown or Memphis, there's an original vision that looks forward as well as back." In The Village Voice, Robert Christgau praised the album as "good pop", while in Rolling Stone, Jimmy Guterman called it a "soulful gem" which "far outshines the debut" and concluded that "it took a while, but The Raw and the Cooked is Fine Young Cannibals' great step forward." More ambivalent was NME reviewer Sean O'Hagan, who likened the album to "consumer muzak" while admitting that he liked "most of it some of the time", mainly "in the background"; in lieu of assigning it a conventional rating, he wrote that on a ten-point scale, he would give it a score of ten as "background noise" and a score of five as "foreground noise".

Retrospective reviews have been even more favourable. In her review for AllMusic, Jo-Ann Greene called it "one of the most exciting albums" released in the 1980s, commenting how "in a mere ten songs and 35 minutes the Fine Young Cannibals created a masterpiece." Greene found that each track "simmers with creativity, as the hooks, sharp melodies, and irrepressible beats are caressed by nuanced arrangements and sparkling production. Never has music's past, present, and future been more exceptionally combined." Tom Doyle of Mojo described The Raw & the Cooked as "an eclectic but sharply-honed album that rightly took them to the toppermost of the poppermost."

In 1990, The Raw & the Cooked won the Brit Award for Best British Album, while it was also nominated for the Grammy Award for Album of the Year. In their respective lists of the best albums of 1989, the Los Angeles Times ranked it second, Musikexpress ranked it third,Rolling Stone ranked it ninth, The Village Voice ranked it 13th, and NME ranked it 41st. Q also included it in their unordered list of the 50 best albums of 1989. In 1989, German publication Tempo ranked the album at number 69 in their list of "The 100 Best Albums of the 80's." In 1995, Q included The Raw & the Cooked in its publication "In Our Lifetime: Q's 100 Best Albums 1986–94", a list compiled to celebrate its 100th issue. Giannis Petridis included it in the 2003 list, "2004 of the Best Albums of the Century." In a 2013 online poll, The Raw & the Cooked was voted the 30th best album of 1988 based on the opinions of 48,000 respondents. (Note: The website included it in their 1988 poll instead of 1989 due to confusion over the album's release date.)

== Aftermath and legacy ==
Inspired by the band's success and "sluggardly production pace", I.R.S. Records released a remix album titled The Raw & the Remix in December 1990. The album, largely consisting of remixes from The Raw & the Cooked, included "two versions each of 'She Drives Me Crazy,' 'I'm Not the Man I Used to Be' and 'I'm Not Satisfied' as well as danceable overhauls of 'Good Thing,' 'Johnny Come Home' and others." The album was said to contain "significant variations" upon the original songs, including numerous "major stylistic adjustments" such as dub dissections and the Soul II Soul remix of "I'm Not the Man I Used to Be". The album reached number 61 on the UK Albums Chart.

The band's record label and manager had never previously experienced success the size of The Raw & the Cooked, and "they didn't know how to handle it". In the words of Gift, "they kept saying to us our next record had to be even bigger which was really stupid. That was one of the main things that killed it for me." As such, the band never recorded a follow-up album, and after a hiatus that began in 1992, their first and only song recorded and released after the album was "The Flame" for their 1996 compilation album The Finest, and they subsequently disbanded. Gift said "We just stopped wanting to do it. You might wake up one day and think 'I'm out' but you don't realise it's been at the back of your mind for a while. It was hard to stick to how we appraised the band originally, which was to make great music."

The innovative snare drum sound from "She Drives Me Crazy" quickly became heavily sampled among numerous different recordings as well as a popular television advertisement for Pepsi in the early 1990s. David Z recalled of the Pepsi advert: "It was all over television, and there was no doubt as to what had inspired the sound, but it was before people thought seriously about protecting things like sounds. The legalities of sampling were still being thrashed out. No one was sure if you could copyright a beat or a groove." He proposed to his lawyer about tackling the Pepsi advert, who responded that Pepsi would win any court case due to them having "a lot of money and a lot of lawyers".

In a list for The Quietus, Pauline Black of The Selecter named The Raw & the Cooked as one of her 13 favourite albums ever. At the time of the album's release, she had "given up on music" and turned to acting, but said the album renewed her faith in music and inspired her to reform The Selecter, saying "When I heard the album, I wished I'd done it myself. They were messing around with Tamla and soul and creating their own sound with it. Andy Cox said it was 30 years of pop music condensed into 30 minutes and that’s what it was; everything that had influenced me all wrapped up and repackaged. It renewed my faith in music."

== Track listing ==
All tracks are written by Roland Gift and David Steele, except where noted.

Side Raw
No.	Title	Length
1.	"She Drives Me Crazy"	3:38
2.	"Good Thing"	3:22
3.	"I'm Not the Man I Used to Be"	4:29
4.	"I'm Not Satisfied"	3:51
5.	"Tell Me What"	2:47

Side Cooked
No.	Title	Writer(s)	Length
6.	"Don't Look Back"		3:40
7.	"It's OK (It's Alright)"	Gift; Steele; Andy Cox	3:32
8.	"Don't Let It Get You Down"		3:23
9.	"As Hard as It Is"		3:14
10.	"Ever Fallen in Love" (Buzzcocks cover)	Pete Shelley	3:54
Total length:			35:49

== Personnel ==
Fine Young Cannibals

- Roland Gift – vocals
- Andy Cox – guitar
- David Steele – bass, keyboards, drum machine

Additional musicians

- Jools Holland – piano on "Good Thing"
- Jimmy Helms, George Chandler, Jimmy Chambers – backing vocals on "Good Thing", "Tell Me What" and "It's OK (It's Alright)"
- Martin Parry – drums on "Tell Me What"
- Simon Fowler – backing vocals on "Don't Look Back"
- Graeme Hamilton – trumpet on "Don't Let It Get You Down" and "As Hard as It Is"
- Jenny Jones – drums, backing vocals on "As Hard as It Is"
- Gavyn Wright – violin on "As Hard as It Is"
- Bridget Enever – saxophone on "As Hard as It Is"

Production

1. "She Drives Me Crazy", co-production between David Z and FYC
2. "Good Thing", production by FYC, remixed and additional engineering by Julian Mendelsohn
3. "I'm Not the Man I Used to Be", production by FYC, engineered by Richard Manwaring
4. "I'm Not Satisfied", co-production between David Z and FYC
5. "Tell Me What", production by FYC, remixed and additional engineering by Julian Mendelsohn
6. "Don't Look Back", production by FYC, remixed by Bruce Lampcov, engineered by Robin Goodfellow
7. "It's OK (It's Alright)", co-produced (sic) by David Z, engineered by Dave Anderson
8. "Don't Let It Get You Down", production by FYC
9. "As Hard as It Is", production by FYC, remixed by FYC and Dave Anderson, additional engineering by John Potoker
10. "Ever Fallen in Love", co-production between Jerry Harrison and FYC, engineered by John Potoker

== Charts ==
=== Weekly charts ===
Chart (1989)	Peak position
Australian Albums (ARIA)	1
Austrian Albums (Ö3 Austria)	1
Canada Top Albums/CDs (RPM)	1
Dutch Albums (Album Top 100)	10
German Albums (Offizielle Top 100)	3
New Zealand Albums (RMNZ)	2
Norwegian Albums (VG-lista)	19
Swedish Albums (Sverigetopplistan)	5
Swiss Albums (Schweizer Hitparade)	2
UK Albums (Official Charts)	1
US Billboard 200	1

=== Year-end charts ===
Chart (1989)	Position
Australian Albums (ARIA)	4
Austrian Albums (Ö3 Austria)	10
Canada Top Albums/CDs (RPM)	1
Dutch Albums (Album Top 100)	81
German Albums (Offizielle Top 100)	7
New Zealand Albums (RMNZ)	7
Swiss Albums (Schweizer Hitparade)	13
US Billboard 200	6

Chart (1990)	Position
US Billboard 200	91

== Certifications ==
Region	Certification	Certified units/sales
Australia (ARIA)	3× Platinum	210,000^{^}
Canada (Music Canada)	6× Platinum	600,000^{^}
France (SNEP)	2× Gold	200,000^{*}
Germany (BVMI)	Platinum	500,000^{^}
Hong Kong (IFPI Hong Kong)	Gold	10,000^{*}
New Zealand (RMNZ)	Platinum	15,000^{^}
Spain (Promusicae)	Gold	50,000^{^}
Sweden (GLF)	Gold	50,000^{^}
Switzerland (IFPI Switzerland)	Platinum	50,000^{^}
United Kingdom (BPI)	3× Platinum	900,000^{^}
United States (RIAA)	2× Platinum	2,000,000^{^}
^{*} Sales figures based on certification alone.^{^} Shipments figures based on certification alone.
