= Fine Young Cannibals (album) =

- European cover. The North American release features the design behind the band's name colored blue.

Studio album by Fine Young Cannibals
- Released: 9 December 1985
- Recorded: 1985
- Studios: Power Plant Studios and Sound Suite Studios, London
- Genres: Pop; R&B
- Length: 34:21
- Labels: I.R.S.; London
- Producers: Robin Millar; Mike Pela; Alvin Clark; Fine Young Cannibals

Fine Young Cannibals chronology
| Fine Young Cannibals (1985) | The Raw & the Cooked (1989) |

Fine Young Cannibals is the debut studio album by the band of the same name, released in 1985.

The album features the band's debut hit single "Johnny Come Home", which reached number 8 on the UK Singles Chart. This success did not continue with the next single, "Blue", which peaked at number 41 in the UK.

The original version of "Blue" on LP and cassette was re-mixed and edited in an attempt to boost its commercial appeal. The second version features additional percussion overdubs but deletes the trumpet and horn parts. Later CD pressings feature the re-mix version of Blue in place of the original album version, with no mention of this on the record. The original mix later appeared on disc 2 of the 2020 reissue titled as "Blue (Dance Version)".

== Critical reception ==
Professional ratings
Review scores
| Source | Rating |
|---|---|
| AllMusic | 4/5 stars |
| Classic Pop | 4/5 stars |
| Mojo | 3/5 stars |
| Record Collector | 4/5 stars |
| Record Mirror | 4 1/2/5 |
| The Rolling Stone Album Guide | 3.5/5 stars |
| Smash Hits | 5/10 |
| Sounds | 4.5/5 stars |
| Uncut | 6/10 |
| The Village Voice | B+ |

Record Mirror critic Stuart Bailie praised "the variety of emotional shades" in Roland Gift's singing on Fine Young Cannibals, adding that the group "are one of the few bands to realise the value of a sparse presentation" and "have an emotional charge that's sorely needed just now". In Rolling Stone, Mark Coleman highlighted Gift's "casual authority" as a vocalist and said that the lyrics "strike a fine balance, noting the subtle and not so subtle toll politics and economics take on relationships. That forecast may be bleak, but Fine Young Cannibals displays a healthy optimism that's as irrepressible as the seamless beat beneath it." Spin's Annie Russo wrote, "The lyrical content on most cuts isn't terribly complicated, one thought turned around a few times; but the sparseness lays snug next to the inlays and wrap-arounds of Gift's voice, along with the more than competent instrumental work, forever keeping the vocals buoyed up."

Stewart Mason, in an AllMusic retrospective review, commented that Fine Young Cannibals "is a powerful and satisfying debut" with "uniformly strong" songs. Nigel Williamson called the album "an artful soul-pop concoction loaded with hooks and hits" in Uncut, while in Classic Pop, John Earls said that it was a testament to the group's reputation as "the soul band even the indie kids love".

== Track listing ==
Songs composed by Roland Gift and David Steele except where noted.

1. "Johnny Come Home" – 3:35
2. "Couldn't Care More" – 3:30
3. "Don't Ask Me to Choose" (Andy Cox, Gift, Steele) – 3:05
4. "Funny How Love Is" (Cox, Gift, Steele) – 3:28
5. "Suspicious Minds" (Mark James) – 3:56
6. "Blue" (Cox, Gift, Steele) – 3:31
7. "Move to Work" – 3:26
8. "On a Promise" – 3:06
9. "Time Isn't Kind" (Cox, Gift, Steele) – 3:12
10. "Like a Stranger" – 3:28

Additional tracks on 1986 edition

11. "Johnny Come Home" (extended mix) – 5:43
12. "Suspicious Minds" (Suspicious mix; Mark James) – 7:52

2011 Rhino Records deluxe edition disc 1
| No. | Title | Writer(s) | Length |
|---|---|---|---|
| 1. | "Johnny Come Home" | | 3:37 |
| 2. | "Couldn't Care More" | | 3:31 |
| 3. | "Don't Ask Me to Choose" | Andy Cox, David Steele, Roland Gift | 3:12 |
| 4. | "Funny How Love Is" | Andy Cox, David Steele, Roland Gift | 3:28 |
| 5. | "Suspicious Minds" | Mark James | 3:59 |
| 6. | "Blue" | Andy Cox, David Steele, Roland Gift | 3:31 |
| 7. | "Move to Work" | | 3:28 |
| 8. | "On a Promise" | | 3:08 |
| 9. | "Time Isn't Kind" | Andy Cox, David Steele, Roland Gift | 3:25 |
| 10. | "Like a Stranger" | | 3:28 |
| 11. | "Wade in the Water" (B-side to "Blue") | Traditional; arranged by Andy Cox, David Steele, Roland Gift | 2:57 |
| 12. | "Love for Sale" (B-side to "Johnny Come Home") | Cole Porter | 2:51 |
| 13. | "Motherless Child" (B-side to "Funny How Love Is") | Traditional; arranged by Andy Cox, David Steele, Roland Gift/Joe the Squid | 2:37 |

2011 Rhino Records deluxe edition disc 2
| No. | Title | Writer(s) | Length |
|---|---|---|---|
| 1. | "Johnny Come Home" (Mark Moore 12" remix) | | 4:49 |
| 2. | "Johnny Come Home" (extended mix; also included on the 1998 edition) | | 5:40 |
| 3. | "Johnny Come Home" (That Other mix) | | 5:09 |
| 4. | "Johnny Takes a Trip" (B-side to "Johnny Come Home", also found on The Raw & the Remix) | | 5:02 |
| 5. | "Suspicious Minds" (extended mix) | Mark James | 4:39 |
| 6. | "Suspicious Minds" (Suspicious mix; also included on the 1998 edition) | Mark James | 7:55 |
| 7. | "Suspicious Minds" (US remix) | Mark James | 5:24 |
| 8. | "Suspicious Minds" (Caught in a Dub) | Mark James | 7:43 |
| 9. | "Suspicious Minds" (Shakedown mix) | Mark James | 3:48 |

== Personnel ==
Fine Young Cannibals

- Roland Gift – vocals
- Andy Cox – guitar, organ on "Time Isn't Kind"
- David Steele – bass, piano, keyboards

Additional musicians

- Martin Parry – drums
- Graeme Hamilton – trumpet, piano solo on "Time Isn't Kind"
- Gavyn Wright – violin
- Saxa – saxophone on "Funny How Love Is"
- Beverlei Brown, Gloria Brown, Maxine Brown – backing vocals on "Like a Stranger"
- Jimmy Somerville – backing vocals on "Suspicious Minds"
- Jenny Jones – drums, backing vocals on "Couldn't Care More"

Technical

- Alvin Clark – engineering
- Mike Pela, Robin Millar – mixing
- Anton Corbijn – front cover photography

== Charts ==
=== Weekly charts ===
| Chart (1985–1986) | Peak position |
|---|---|
| Australian Albums (Kent Music Report) | 2 |
| Canada Top Albums/CDs (RPM) | 21 |
| Dutch Albums (Album Top 100) | 21 |
| German Albums (Offizielle Top 100) | 42 |
| New Zealand Albums (RMNZ) | 11 |
| Swiss Albums (Schweizer Hitparade) | 17 |
| UK Albums (Official Charts) | 11 |
| US Billboard 200 | 49 |

=== Year-end charts ===
| Chart (1986) | Peak position |
|---|---|
| Australian Albums (Kent Music Report) | 15 |

== Certifications ==
| Region | Certification | Certified units/sales |
|---|---|---|
| Canada (Music Canada) | Platinum | 100,000^{^} |
| United Kingdom (BPI) | Gold | 100,000^{^} |
^{^} Shipments figures based on certification alone.
