= Fried (band) =

UK music duo

- Origin: UK
- Genres: R&B, soul, funk
- Years active: 2001–present
- Labels: London Records (2003); RCA (2007–present)
- Members: Jonte Short; David Steele
- Website: Official Site

Fried are a musical duo made up of US soul singer Jonte Short, and ex-The Beat and Fine Young Cannibals guitarist David Steele.

David Steele looked for a singer for his new project away from The Beat and Fine Young Cannibals for five years. He finally met Jonte Short in 2001 at the New Orleans Jazz Festival and they decided to collaborate. Steele and Short worked together on songs that Steele had already written, and they also wrote new ones together. The duo decided to name themselves Fried, after Southern U.S. cooking, and started recording in New Orleans and London.

Fried, after working on their album for five years, signed to London Records the home of Steele's previous group Fine Young Cannibals to release their debut self-titled album, which spawned the singles "Whatever I Choose I Lose" and "When I Get Out Of Jail". However, the band's career with the label was short-lived and were subsequently dropped from the label due to poor sales.

In 2007, however, the band were re-signed, this time to RCA and Fried decided to re-work their debut album and three new songs were added, while removing two. "I'll Be There" was released as the album's lead single, while they re-titled the album Things Change. The album was released on 16 July 2007.

== Discography ==
=== Albums ===
- Fried (2004)
- Things Change (2007)

=== Singles ===
- "Whatever I Choose I Lose" (2004)
- "When I Get Out of Jail" (2004)
- "I'll Be There" (2007)
