= She Drives Me Crazy =

1988 song by Fine Young Cannibals

- Standard artwork for original 1988 release

Single by Fine Young Cannibals

from the album The Raw & the Cooked
- B-side: "Pull the Sucker Off"
- Released: 26 December 1988
- Studio: Paisley Park (Chanhassen, Minnesota)
- Genre: Dance-rock; funk; soul; pop
- Length: 3:38 (LP version); 3:48 (single remix)
- Label: London
- Songwriters: Roland Gift; David Steele
- Producers: David Z; Fine Young Cannibals

Fine Young Cannibals singles chronology
"Ever Fallen in Love (With Someone You Shouldn't've)" (1987)	"She Drives Me Crazy" (1988)	"Good Thing" (1989)

Music video
- "She Drives Me Crazy" on YouTube

"She Drives Me Crazy" is a song by British group Fine Young Cannibals, released in 1988 by London Records as the first single from their second and final album, The Raw & the Cooked (1989). The song was written by the group's singer, Roland Gift, with the guitarist, David Steele, and produced by FYC with David Z.

"She Drives Me Crazy" reached number five on the UK singles chart, becoming the band's highest-charting single in their home country. It proved a bigger hit in the United States, topping the Billboard Hot 100 for one week and becoming the first of two chart-topping singles for the band on that chart (the other being "Good Thing", released the following year). It also reached number one in several other countries, including Australia, Austria, Canada, Israel, New Zealand and Spain. Two different music videos were produced for the song, directed by Philippe Decouflé and Pedro Romhanyi.

In 2018, Time Out magazine listed "She Drives Me Crazy" at No. 28 in their countdown of "The 50 Best '80s Songs". In 2023, Billboard magazine ranked it No. 77 in their "500 Best Pop Songs of All Time". American country artist Dolly Parton included a reimagined country cover version on her 2008 album Backwoods Barbie.

== Recording ==
"She Drives Me Crazy" was co-produced by David Z, known for his work with Prince, and recorded in Studio B of Prince's Paisley Park complex outside Minneapolis. The distinctive snare drum "pop" was created by striking a snare drum skin with a ruler and blending the recording with a 12-bit Linn 9000 snare sample run through an equaliser boosted at 1kHz. This was then replayed from a small speaker placed on a snare drum, and recorded via a microphone below. Finally, the result was processed with gated reverb.

== Critical reception ==
Jo-Ann Greene from AllMusic stated that "She Drives Me Crazy" "features the most unique, and instantly identifiable, beat/riff combination of the decade." The Daily Vault's Christopher Thelen noted that it, "with its synthesized drums, was a great party song - Gift's falsetto delivery which went into a full-fledged roar was perfect for the track. Even the guitar work fits the track — from the jangly jazz riffs to the crunch of the power chords." David Bennun from Melody Maker said that "She Drives Me Crazy" "clattered and chugged and breathed limpid desire just about as well as you could in the Eighties."

Pan-European magazine Music & Media described it as a "subtly persuasive pop number that is sure to attract major airplay on pop and rock radio." Pop Rescue called it a "real gem with plenty of guitar, interesting vocals and beeping synth layers." Andy Strickland from Record Mirror wrote, "Always interesting, always a few surprises and this is no exception from the bandy trio. A stuttering pop record that's too slow to dance to and too fast to smooch to. The FYCs always sprinkle some interesting sounds over their records and here we have funky guitar breaks, heavy metal chords and plenty of things going boing, clicky click ding." James Hamilton from the magazine's DJ Directory deemed it a "haunting sparse jittery tapped then chunky rock guitar chorded whinneying falsetto 108½bpm lurcher".

It was parodied by "Weird Al" Yankovic as "She Drives Like Crazy" on the UHF – Original Motion Picture Soundtrack and Other Stuff album.

== Music video ==
Two music videos were produced for "She Drives Me Crazy", one by French choreographer, dancer, mime artist, and theatre director Philippe Decouflé and another by Pedro Romhanyi. The video received several nominations at the 1989 MTV Video Music Awards, including "Best Video".

== In popular culture ==
The song was featured in a 2025 Chanel video for the CHANEL 25 handbag featuring singer Jennie, a Chanel style ambassador.

== Re-release ==
CD edition of the 1996/97 re-release

The song was re-released in 1997 in support of Fine Young Cannibals' compilation album The Finest. It included a remix by Roger Sanchez, as well as Mousse T. remixes of "Johnny Come Home". The single reached No. 36 on the UK Singles Chart. "She Drives Me Crazy (Seth Troxler 'Out of Time' Remix)" was released in 2020 by London Records.

== Track listings ==
- 7" single
1. "She Drives Me Crazy" – 3:35
2. "Pull the Sucker Off" – 3:34
- 12" single
1. "She Drives Me Crazy" (David Z Remix) - 7:05
2. "She Drives Me Crazy" (Driven Crazy Dub) - 5:33
3. "She Drives Me Crazy (Justin Strauss Remix) - 7:39
4. "She Drives Me Crazy (Single Remix) - 3:48
- CD maxi
1. "She Drives Me Crazy" - 3:35
2. "Pull the Sucker Off" - 3:37
3. "Tired of Getting Pushed Around" (The Mayhem Rhythm Remix) - 6:37
- CD maxi (1997 Re-release)
1. "She Drives Me Crazy" (Original 7") - 3:36
2. "She Drives Me Crazy" (Roger Sanchez Radio Edit) - 3:33
3. "Johnny Come Home" (Mousse T. Edit) - 4:06
4. "Johnny Come Home" (Mousse T. Cocktail Mix) - 4:13

== Personnel ==
- Roland Gift – vocals
- Andy Cox – guitar
- David Steele – bass, keyboards, drum machine

== Charts ==
=== Weekly charts ===
Chart (1989)	Peak position
Australia (ARIA)	1
Austria (Ö3 Austria Top 40)	1
Belgium (Ultratop 50 Flanders)	2
Canada Retail Singles (The Record)	1
Canada Top Singles (RPM)	1
Canada Dance/Urban (RPM)	1
Europe (Eurochart Hot 100)	4
Finland (Suomen virallinen lista)	5
France (SNEP)	11
Iceland (Íslenski Listinn Topp 10)	3
Ireland (IRMA)	2
Israel (Israeli Singles Chart)	1
Italy (Musica e dischi)	10
Italy Airplay (Music & Media)	1
Luxembourg (Radio Luxembourg)	4
Netherlands (Dutch Top 40)	3
Netherlands (Single Top 100)	5
New Zealand (Recorded Music NZ)	1
Norway (VG-lista)	6
Spain (AFYVE)	1
Sweden (Sverigetopplistan)	4
Switzerland (Schweizer Hitparade)	3
UK Singles (Official Charts)	5
US Billboard Hot 100	1
US 12-inch Singles Sales (Billboard)	3
US Dance Club Play (Billboard)	1
US Hot Black Singles (Billboard)	54
US Modern Rock Tracks (Billboard)	5
US Cash Box Top 100	1
US Dance Tracks (Dance Music Report)	1
West Germany (GfK)	2

Chart (1997)	Peak position
UK Singles (Official Charts)	36

=== Year-end charts ===
Chart (1989)	Position
Australia (ARIA)	6
Austria (Ö3 Austria Top 40)	1
Belgium (Ultratop)	27
Canada Top Singles (RPM)	11
Canada Dance/Urban (RPM)	4
Europe (Eurochart Hot 100)	11
Israel (Israeli Singles Chart)	5
Netherlands (Dutch Top 40)	35
Netherlands (Single Top 100)	40
New Zealand (RIANZ)	5
Switzerland (Schweizer Hitparade)	7
UK Singles (OCC)	58
US Billboard Hot 100	18
US 12-inch Singles Sales (Billboard)	16
US Dance Club Play (Billboard)	7
US Modern Rock Tracks (Billboard)	14
US Cash Box Top 100	12
West Germany (Media Control)	8

== Certifications ==
Region	Certification	Certified units/sales
Australia (ARIA)	Platinum	70,000^{^}
Canada (Music Canada)	Gold	50,000^{^}
Germany (BVMI)	Gold	250,000^{^}
Sweden (GLF)	Gold	25,000^{^}
United Kingdom (BPI)	Platinum	600,000^{‡}
United States (RIAA)	Gold	500,000^{^}
^{^} Shipments figures based on certification alone.^{‡} Sales+streaming figures based on certification alone.
