= Funny How Love Is =

Funny How Love Is may refer to:

- "Funny How Love Is", a song by Queen from Queen II
- "Funny How Love Is", a song by Fine Young Cannibals from Fine Young Cannibals
