= I'm Not Satisfied =

Single by Fine Young Cannibals

from the album The Raw & the Cooked
- B-side: "Wade In The Water"
- Released: 8 February 1990
- Genre: Pop, rock
- Length: 3:46
- Label: I.R.S.
- Songwriters: Roland Gift, David Steele
- Producer: Fine Young Cannibals

Fine Young Cannibals singles chronology
"I'm Not the Man I Used to Be" (1989)	"I'm Not Satisfied" (1990)	"It's O.K." (1990)

"I'm Not Satisfied" is a song by British pop-rock band Fine Young Cannibals, released by label I.R.S. in February 1990 as the fifth single from their second and final album, The Raw and the Cooked (1989). The single charted in the United Kingdom, United States and Canada. In the US, it peaked at numbers 84 and 90 on the Cash Box Top 100 and Billboard Hot 100 charts. In the UK, "I'm Not Satisfied" peaked at number 46.

== Composition and critical reception ==
Written by lead vocalist Roland Gift and bassist David Steele, "I'm Not Satisfied" depicts a man who criticizes the weekends for being too short, his girlfriend for being too possessive, and the city for being too depressing. AllMusic writer Dave Thompson praised Gift's vocals, saying "so overpowering is his performance, so emotionally devastating is his dissatisfaction, that one is dragged straight into the maelstrom of misery."

== Track listing ==
- 7" vinyl (UK)
1. "I'm Not Satisfied" - 3:46
2. "I'm Not Satisfied" (The Nicci Edit) - 3:52
- 12" vinyl, CD maxi-single
1. "I'm Not Satisfied" (New York Rap Mix) - 4:02
2. "I'm Not Satisfied" (New York Singing Mix) - 4:00
3. "I'm Not Satisfied" (The Nicci Version) - 4:34
4. "I'm Not Satisfied" (Single Version) - 3:46

== Charts ==
Chart (1990)	Peak position
Canada Top Singles (RPM)	83
Italy Airplay (Music & Media)	1
UK Singles (OCC)	46
US Billboard Hot 100	90
US Cash Box Top 100	84
