= Don't Look Back (Fine Young Cannibals song) =

1989 single by Fine Young Cannibals

Single by Fine Young Cannibals

from the album The Raw & the Cooked
- B-side: "You Never Know"
- Released: 7 August 1989
- Length: 3:43
- Label: London
- Songwriters: Roland Gift, David Steele
- Producer: Fine Young Cannibals

Fine Young Cannibals singles chronology
"Good Thing" (1989)	"Don't Look Back" (1989)	"I'm Not the Man I Used to Be" (1989)

"Don't Look Back" is a song by British pop-rock band Fine Young Cannibals. It was released as the third single from the band's second studio album, The Raw & the Cooked. The song reached the top 10 on the charts of Canada and Ireland and peaked at number 11 in the United States.

== Music and lyrics ==
Written by lead vocalist Roland Gift and bassist David Steele, the lyrics of "Don't Look Back" are mostly pessimistic, and depict someone who tries desperately to leave their difficult past behind them without looking back. While the band's previous two hits, the US number ones "She Drives Me Crazy" and "Good Thing", were influenced by American rhythm and blues, "Don't Look Back" features guitar riffs that are more reminiscent of The Byrds and The Beatles.

== Release and reception ==
Released on 7 August 1989, "Don't Look Back" reached number 11 on the US Billboard Hot 100 chart, number nine on the Billboard Modern Rock Tracks chart, and number 10 on the Cash Box Top 100 chart. In Canada, the song peaked at number 10 on the RPM 100 Singles chart in October. It also reached number 34 on the UK Singles Chart, number 23 in New Zealand, and number 38 in Australia.

== Track listings ==
7-inch vinyl (Europe, Australasia)

1. "Don't Look Back" – 3:43
2. "You Never Know" – 4:27

7-inch vinyl (US, Canada)

1. "Don't Look Back" – 3:36
2. "As Hard As It Is" – 3:10

12-inch vinyl, CD maxi-single

1. "Don't Look Back" (12-inch mix) – 5:50
2. "You Never Know" – 4:27
3. "Don't Look Back" (7-inch mix) – 3:43

== Charts ==
=== Weekly charts ===
Chart (1989)	Peak position
Australia (ARIA)	38
Canada Top Singles (RPM)	10
Ireland (IRMA)	10
New Zealand (Recorded Music NZ)	23
UK Singles (Official Charts)	34
US Billboard Hot 100	11
US 12-inch Singles Sales (Billboard)	26
US Album Rock Tracks (Billboard)	38
US Modern Rock Tracks (Billboard)	9
US Cash Box Top 100	10
West Germany (GfK)	29

=== Year-end charts ===
Chart (1989)	Position
Canada Top Singles (RPM)	71

== Release history ==
Region	Date	Format(s)	Label(s)	Ref(s).
United Kingdom	7 August 1989	7-inch vinyl; 12-inch vinyl; CD; cassette	London	
United Kingdom	28 August 1989	12-inch vinyl with 3-D cover	London	
Japan	1 October 1989	Mini-CD	London	
