= Akrylykz =

Ska band

- Origin: Kingston upon Hull, East Riding of Yorkshire, England
- Genres: Ska
- Years active: 1978–1981
- Labels: Red Rhino, Polydor
- Past members: Roland Gift; Steve Pears; Stevie Robottom; Wojciech Swiderski; Fred Reynolds; Nik Townend

Akrylykz (originally Akrylyk(z) Vyktymz) were a British ska band, formed by members of Hull School of Art in Kingston upon Hull, East Riding of Yorkshire, England, that featured Roland Gift (later of Fine Young Cannibals) originally as a tenor saxophonist, but his role later expanded to frontman and lead singer. Other members of the group were Steve Pears (vocals, tenor saxophone), Stevie "B" Robottom (vocals, alto saxophone, keyboards), Wojciech "Piotr" Swiderski (aka Pete Swiderskip) (drums), Michael "Fred" Reynolds (bass), and Nik "Akrylyk" Townend (guitar).

== History ==
The band was formed in Hull in December 1978 originally as the Akrylyk Vyktymz and played one of its first gigs at the Wellington Club, Hull in June 1979. The following year, the band's name was shortened to Akrylykz and they played one of its first public gigs at Hull Technical College supporting The Mekons. The band enjoyed limited success until the early 1980s releasing a double A-side single, "Spyderman" / "Smart Boy", on the York based Red Rhino Records, before being signed to Polydor. The band released a second single "JD" for Polydor, but were subsequently dropped by the label as the ska revival boom faded.

In 1980, Akrylykz (without drummer Swiderski, who had suffered a hand injury) recorded a number of sessions with Desmond Dekker for his album, Black and Dekker, on Stiff Records, which reprised many of his hits.

In their time, the band toured extensively in their own right as well as supporting The Beat, The Specials, Madness, and other 2 Tone bands. They also opened for The Clash on at least one occasion. Horace Panter mentioned Akrylykz (misspelled Akrylyx) on page 89 of his autobiography Ska'd For Life.

=== Aftermath after disbandment ===
Townend went on to form his own record label, Vital Records, featuring the Hull University-based reggae band Bushfire, headed up by Mark Douglas (bass, vocals and songwriting), in which Townend played guitar and wrote some songs, before leaving Hull and moving to London. The label released material by a number of local bands including Nyam Nyam, led by the former Mojo editor and Iggy Pop biographer, Paul Trynka.

The compilation album 100% British Ska (1998) featured the Akrylykz tracks "Spyderman" (Gift/Townend) and "Smart Boy" (Steve B./Townend).

== Discography ==
- "Spyderman" / "Smart Boy" – Red Rhino, Red 2, 1979 (Released on 17 January 1980)
- "JD" / "Ska'd for Life" – Polydor, 2059 253, 1980
- Black and Dekker (with Desmond Dekker) – Stiff, SEEZ 26, 1980
