= It's Only Money (Roland Gift song) =

Single by Roland Gift

from the album Roland Gift
- B-side: "Love's Not Enough"; "It's Only Money" (Instrumental)
- Released: 4 March 2002
- Genre: Indie rock
- Length: 3:53
- Label: MCA
- Songwriter(s): Roland Gift

Roland Gift singles chronology
"It's Only Money" (2002)	"Crushed" (2009)

"It's Only Money" is a song by British singer Roland Gift. The song serves as the lead single of the singer's debut solo album, Roland Gift. The song was released on 4 March in the United Kingdom where it debuted at number 123 on the UK Singles Chart.

== Track listing ==
1. "It's Only Money" (Album Version)
2. "Love's Not Enough" (Album Version)
3. "It's Only Money" (Instrumental)

== Charts ==
Chart (2002)	Peak position
UK Singles (OCC)	123
