= Roland Gift (album) =

2002 studio album by Roland Gift

Studio album by Roland Gift
- Released: 18 March 2002
- Recorded: 2001–2002
- Genre: Pop
- Labels: Pid; MCA
- Producers: Ben Barson; David Z; Roland Gift

Singles from Roland Gift
- 1. "It's Only Money" Released: 4 March 2002

Roland Gift is the only studio album by English singer Roland Gift, released in 2002. It includes songs co-written with the Kane Gang's Martin Brammer and Mike Barson's brother Ben. The cover photography was by Chris Floyd.

Only one single was released from the album; "It's Only Money". The album failed to chart in the UK Albums Chart.

"Say It Ain't So" was used in the soundtrack for the film Stealing Beauty.

== Track listing ==
1. "Tell Me You Want Me Back" (Roland Gift) - 3:15
2. "Looking for a Friend" (Roland Gift, Evan Rogers, Carl Sturken) - 4:28
3. "It's Only Money" (Roland Gift, Evan Rogers, Carl Sturken) - 3:54
4. "Wish You Were Here" (Roland Gift, Ben Barson) - 3:49
5. "A Girl Like You" (Roland Gift, Ian Richardson) - 3:46
6. "Fairytale" (Roland Gift, Evan Rogers, Carl Sturken) - 4:49
7. "Superhero" (Roland Gift, Evan Rogers, Carl Sturken) - 4:45
8. "Lady DJ" (Roland Gift, Ben Barson) - 3:35
9. "Say It Ain't So" (Roland Gift) - 4:03
10. "Flown" (Ben Barson, Martin Brammer, Roland Gift) - 4:29
11. "If We Ain't Got Love" (Roland Gift, Ben Barson) - 4:14
12. "What Do You Mean" (Roland Gift, Ben Barson) - 3:22
