= I'm Not the Man I Used to Be =

Single by Fine Young Cannibals

from the album The Raw & the Cooked
- B-side: "Motherless Child"
- Released: 1989
- Genre: Pop rock
- Length: 4:20
- Label: I.R.S.
- Songwriter(s): Roland Gift, David Steele
- Producer(s): Fine Young Cannibals

Fine Young Cannibals singles chronology
"Don't Look Back" (1989)	"I'm Not the Man I Used to Be" (1989)	"I'm Not Satisfied" (1990)

"I'm Not the Man I Used to Be" is a song by British pop-rock band Fine Young Cannibals. It was released as the fourth single from the band's 1988 album The Raw & the Cooked. The song reached the top 40 charts in the United Kingdom, Canada, Austria, and the Netherlands.

== Composition ==
Written by lead vocalist Roland Gift and bassist David Steele, "I'm Not the Man I Used to Be" contains prominent drum beats with keyboards and finger-picked guitar accompaniment. The song utilises throughout the track a sample from "Funky Drummer" by James Brown. Allmusic writer Jo-Ann Greene described the song as having "a futuristic jungle beat and an almost housey production".

== Release and reception ==
"I'm Not the Man I Used to Be" entered the UK Singles Chart in November 1989 and spent eight weeks on the chart, peaking at number 20. The song also peaked at number 29 in Austria and the Netherlands, number 35 in Canada, and number 54 in the United States.

Dave Thompson of AllMusic praised Gift for "[h]is introspective lyrics and almost wistful performance".

== Track listing ==
7" vinyl

1. "I'm Not the Man I Used to Be" - 4:20
2. "Motherless Child" - 2:33

12" vinyl, CD maxi-single

1. "I'm Not the Man I Used to Be" (7" Mix) - 4:20
2. "I'm Not the Man I Used to Be" (12" Remix) - 4:42
3. "I'm Not the Man I Used to Be" (Instrumental) - 4:25
4. "Motherless Child" - 2:37

== Charts ==
Chart (1989)	Peak position
UK Singles Chart	20
Austrian Singles Chart	29
Canadian Singles Chart	35
Dutch Top 40	29
US Billboard Hot 100	54
US Dance Music/Club Play	8
