= Gloria D. Brown =

American singer

- Born: 1959 (age 66–67); Montgomery, Alabama, U.S.
- Genres: R&B, soul, funk, pop
- Label: 10, Krystal

Gloria D. Brown (born 1959 in Montgomery, Alabama) is an American singer. Brown had a single called "The More They Knock, The More I Love You" in the UK singles charts. It was released on the 10 label, entered the chart on 8 June 1985, and rose to a high of number 57; it remained in the charts for 3 weeks.

Another single, "What Does It Take", was released on the Krystal label, and appeared in Billboard magazine's list of Hot Black Singles in August 1986, at number 69.
