= Fine Young Cannibals =

British pop rock band

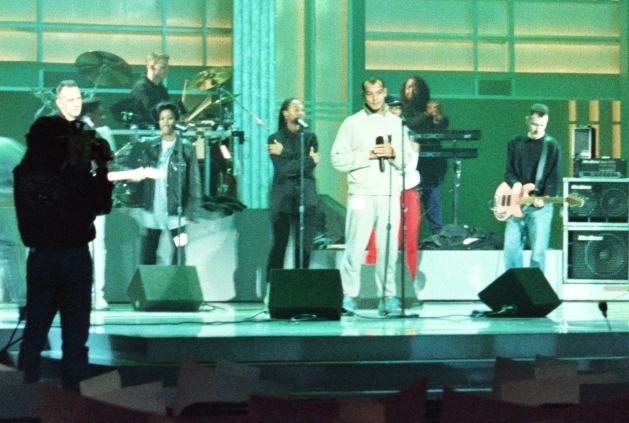
- Fine Young Cannibals, 1990

Background information
- Also known as: Two Men; a Drum Machine and a Trumpet
- Origin: Birmingham, West Midlands, England
- Genres: Pop rock; sophisti-pop; ska; progressive soul
- Years active: 1984–1992; 1996
- Labels: London; I.R.S.
- Spinoff of: The Beat; Akrylykz
- Past members: Roland Gift; Andy Cox; David Steele

Fine Young Cannibals (FYC) were a British pop rock band formed in Birmingham, West Midlands, in 1984 by former The Beat bassist David Steele and guitarist Andy Cox, with singer Roland Gift (formerly of the Akrylykz). Their self-titled 1985 debut album contained "Johnny Come Home" and a cover of "Suspicious Minds", two songs that were top 40 hits in the UK, Canada, Australia and Europe. Their 1989 album, The Raw & the Cooked, topped the UK, US, Australian and Canadian album charts, and contained their two Billboard Hot 100 number ones: "She Drives Me Crazy" and "Good Thing".

In 1990, the band won two Brit Awards: Best British Group and Best British Album (for The Raw & the Cooked).

== History ==
The group was formed in 1984 after the dissolution of The Beat, with whom Cox and Steele previously played. Their name came from the 1960 film All the Fine Young Cannibals starring Robert Wagner and Natalie Wood. The duo of Steele and Cox spent eight months listening to over 500 cassettes of potential singers before picking Gift. They had difficulty obtaining a record contract, but when a video of their song "Johnny Come Home" appeared on British TV show The Tube, recording contract offers flowed in immediately. The band's eponymous debut album was released in 1985, spawning two UK hit singles, "Johnny Come Home" and a cover of Elvis Presley's "Suspicious Minds" featuring additional vocals by Jimmy Somerville. The two songs also became hits internationally, charting in the top 40 in Europe, Canada, and Australia although they failed to make a significant impact on the US charts.

Fine Young Cannibals appeared as the house band in a nightclub in the 1987 comedy film Tin Men and also contributed songs to the film's soundtrack, including "Good Thing".

In the gap between their first and second albums, Steele and Cox released the instrumental house single "Tired of Getting Pushed Around" in 1987 as "Two Men, a Drum Machine and a Trumpet", which reached No. 18 in the UK Singles Chart and was popular on the U.S. dance chart. During this time, Gift appeared in the movie Sammy and Rosie Get Laid.

The band continued their international success with the singles "She Drives Me Crazy" and "Good Thing", from the 1989 album The Raw & the Cooked. Both songs reached No. 1 in the United States. "She Drives Me Crazy" also topped the Australian chart for three non-consecutive weeks and peaked at No. 5 in the UK, while "Good Thing" peaked at No. 7 in both countries. The Raw & the Cooked included three songs the band had recorded for Tin Men (including "Good Thing"), and their cover of the Buzzcocks' "Ever Fallen in Love (With Someone You Shouldn't've)" recorded for the film Something Wild.

In 1990, the band contributed a version of Cole Porter's "Love for Sale" to the AIDS research benefit album Red Hot + Blue, produced by the Red Hot Organization.

Fine Young Cannibals disbanded in 1992, although they briefly returned to the studio in 1996 to record a new single, "Flame", for the greatest hits compilation The Finest. In 2025, Gift announced a two-show tour in 2025 billed as "Roland Gift Presents Fine Young Cannibals", with an unknown line-up as of July 2025.

The group released the album “FYC 40” to commemorate the 40th anniversary of their self titled first album on 12 May 2025.

== Band members ==
- Andy Cox – guitars, keyboards
- Roland Gift – vocals
- David Steele – bass, keyboards, drum machine

Session and touring members

- Martin Parry – drums, percussion
- Graeme Hamilton – trumpet, piano
- Nigel Darvill – keyboards

== Awards and nominations ==
Year	Awards	Work	Category	Result	Ref.
1989	MTV Video Music Awards	"She Drives Me Crazy"	Video of the Year	Nominated	
1989	MTV Video Music Awards	"She Drives Me Crazy"	Best Group Video	Nominated	
1989	MTV Video Music Awards	"She Drives Me Crazy"	Breakthrough Video	Nominated	
1989	MTV Video Music Awards	"She Drives Me Crazy"	Viewer's Choice	Nominated	
1990	Brit Awards	Themselves	British Group	Won	
1990	Brit Awards	The Raw & the Cooked	British Album of the Year	Won	
1990	Grammy Awards	"She Drives Me Crazy"	Record of the Year	Nominated	
1990	Grammy Awards	"She Drives Me Crazy"	Best Pop Performance by a Duo or Group with Vocals	Nominated	
1990	Grammy Awards	The Raw & the Cooked	Album of the Year	Nominated	
1990	Juno Awards	The Raw & the Cooked	International Album of the Year	Nominated	
1990	Juno Awards	"She Drives Me Crazy"	International Single of the Year	Nominated	
1990	Ivor Novello Awards	"She Drives Me Crazy"	Best Contemporary Song	Nominated	
1990	Ivor Novello Awards	"She Drives Me Crazy"	International Hit of the Year	Won	
1990	Pollstar Concert Industry Awards	Tour	Best Debut Tour	Nominated	
1990	D&AD Awards	"Don't Look Back"	Individual Video	Graphite Pencil	
1990	ASCAP Pop Music Awards	"Good Thing"	Most Performed Songs	Won	
1990	ASCAP Pop Music Awards	"She Drives Me Crazy"	Most Performed Songs	Won	
1991	ASCAP Pop Music Awards	"She Drives Me Crazy"	Most Performed Songs	Won	

== Discography ==
=== Studio albums ===
Year	Album details	Peak chart positions										Certifications (sales threshold)
Year	Album details	UK	AUS	AUT	CAN	GER	NL	NZ	SWE	SWI	US	Certifications (sales threshold)
1985	Fine Young Cannibals: Release date: 9 December 1985; Label: London, I.R.S.	11	2	—	21	42	21	11	—	17	49	BPI: Gold; MC: Platinum
1989	The Raw & the Cooked: Release date: 6 February 1989; Label: London, I.R.S.	1	1	1	1	3	10	2	5	2	1	BPI: 3× Platinum; ARIA: 3× Platinum; MC: 6× Platinum; RIAA: 2× Platinum
"—" denotes releases that did not chart

=== Compilation albums ===
Year	Album details	Peak chart positions						Certifications (sales threshold)
Year	Album details	UK	AUS	AUT	BEL (Fl)	GER	NZ	Certifications (sales threshold)
1996	The Finest: Release date: 11 November 1996; Label: London	10	56	22	39	47	21	BPI: Platinum
2006	The Platinum Collection: Release date: 21 March 2006; Label: Warner Deluxe	—	—	—	—	—	—	
2009	She Drives Me Crazy: Release date: 23 February 2009; Label: MC Deluxe	—	—	—	—	—	—	
2012	The Collection	—	—	—	—	—	—	
2025	FYC40							
"—" denotes releases that did not chart

=== Remix albums ===
Year	Album details	Peak chart positions		
Year	Album details	UK	AUS	GER
1990	The Raw & the Remix: Release date: 11 December 1990; Label: I.R.S.	61	114	38

=== Singles ===
Year	Single	Peak chart positions										Certifications	Album
Year	Single	UK	AUS	BEL (Fl)	CAN	GER	IRE	NL	NZ	US	US Dance	Certifications	Album
1985	"Johnny Come Home"	8	14	8	16	16	10	10	13	76	9		Fine Young Cannibals
1985	"Blue"	41	13	34	—	—	—	—	45	—	9		Fine Young Cannibals
1986	"Suspicious Minds"	8	6	22	21	37	9	21	14	—	23		Fine Young Cannibals
1986	"Funny How Love Is"	58	97	—	—	—	27	—	—	—	—		Fine Young Cannibals
1987	"Ever Fallen in Love"	9	20	28	—	19	10	34	23	—	11		Something Wild (soundtrack)
1988	"She Drives Me Crazy"	5	1	2	1	2	2	5	1	1	1	BPI: Platinum	The Raw & the Cooked
1989	"Good Thing"	7	7	13	1	8	4	36	4	1	20		The Raw & the Cooked
1989	"Don't Look Back"	34	38	38	10	29	10	—	23	11	—		The Raw & the Cooked
1989	"I'm Not the Man I Used to Be"	20	109	—	35	33	8	29	—	54	8		The Raw & the Cooked
1990	"I'm Not Satisfied"	46	145	—	83	66	19	—	—	90	—		The Raw & the Cooked
1990	"It's OK (It's Alright)"	—	169	—	—	44	—	—	—	—			The Raw & the Cooked
1996	"The Flame"	17	85	65	—	65	—	—	36	—	—		The Finest
1997	"She Drives Me Crazy 1997"	36	—	—	—	—	—	—	—	—	—		The Finest
"—" denotes releases that did not chart

== See also ==
- List of Billboard number-one singles
- List of artists who reached number one in the United States
- List of Billboard number-one dance club songs
- List of artists who reached number one on the U.S. Dance Club Songs chart
