= Andy Cox =

British guitarist

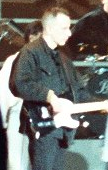
- Cox in the Fine Young Cannibals 1990

Background information
- Born: Andrew Cox; 26 January 1956 (age 70); Birmingham, Warwickshire, England
- Genres: Ska; new wave; pop rock
- Occupation: Guitarist
- Years active: 1978–present
- Labels: Sire; Fidela
- Formerly of: The Beat; Fine Young Cannibals

Andrew Cox (born 25 January 1956) is a British guitarist, was one of the founding members of the ska band the Beat in 1978, and of the band Fine Young Cannibals in 1985.

== Career ==
=== The Beat ===
Alongside Dave Wakeling, he jointly formed the ska band The Beat in 1978. Some of their notable hits included "Mirror in the Bathroom", "Hands Off...She's Mine" and "Can't Get Used to Losing You". The Beat achieved eight Top 40 singles and three hit albums in the UK before announcing their break up in 1983.

=== Fine Young Cannibals ===
In 1985 he joined fellow Beat member David Steele and singer Roland Gift, to form pop rock band Fine Young Cannibals. In the late eighties the band (also known as FYC) released singles including "Johnny Come Home" (1985), "Suspicious Minds" (1986), "Ever Fallen in Love (With Someone You Shouldn't've)" (1987), "She Drives Me Crazy" (1988), "Good Thing" (1989) and others. The group disbanded in 1992, but reunited briefly to record a new song for their The Finest compilation album in 1996.

=== Other work ===
In 1988, while Fine Young Cannibals were on hiatus, Cox and Steele released the instrumental house music single, "Tired of Getting Pushed Around", under the name of Two Men, A Drum Machine and A Trumpet. It reached No. 18 in the UK Singles Chart. That same year, they also collaborated with Wee Papa Girl Rappers debut single "Heat It Up" which peaked at No. 21.

In 2002, Cox formed Cribabi with Japanese vocalist Yukari Fujiu and released the album Volume on his own Fidela record label.
