= Good Thing (Fine Young Cannibals song) =

Single by Fine Young Cannibals

from the album The Raw & the Cooked
- B-side: "Social Security"
- Released: 3 April 1989
- Genre: Northern soul; pop-soul; R&B
- Length: 3:24
- Label: London
- Songwriters: Roland Gift, David Steele
- Producer: Fine Young Cannibals

Fine Young Cannibals singles chronology
| "She Drives Me Crazy" (1988) | "Good Thing" (1989) | "Don't Look Back" (1989) |

"Good Thing" is a song by British band Fine Young Cannibals, released as the second single from their second and last album, The Raw & the Cooked (1989). The song was their second and final US number one (following 1988's "She Drives Me Crazy"), topping the Billboard Hot 100 on 8 July 1989. It also peaked at number one in Canada and entered the top 10 in Australia, Finland, Ireland, New Zealand, and the United Kingdom.

The song made its first appearance in Tin Men (1987). Fine Young Cannibals portrayed a nightclub band in the movie, performing this song and three others (including the single's B-side "Social Security"). The film is set in Baltimore in 1963, and the song's retro soul style is consistent with that setting. Jools Holland played piano on the track, noting that it was "one of the biggest selling records I've ever played on".

== Music video ==
The accompanying music video for "Good Thing" was directed by Peter Care and features many scenes with the Orribly Good Scooter Club, the Jokers and A41 Eagles displaying their motor scooters, both at rest and in motion, as part of scooterboy culture. The scooters featured include stock scooters, as well as highly stylised scooters and minimalist cutdown scooters.

== Track listings ==
- 7-inch single
1. "Good Thing" – 3:22
2. "Social Security" – 3:26
- 12-inch maxi
1. "Good Thing" (Prince Paul remix) – 5:30
2. "Good Thing" (7-inch mix) – 3:22
3. "Good Thing" (Nothing Like the Single mix – instrumental) – 4:38
- 10-inch limited edition
1. "Good Thing" – 3:22
2. "Good Thing (Double Groove Alternate)" – 3:22
3. "Social Security" – 3:26
- CD maxi
1. "Good Thing" (7-inch mix) – 3:25
2. "Good Thing" (Nothing Like the Single mix) – 4:42
3. "She Drives Me Crazy" (Monie Love remix) – 5:59

== Charts ==
=== Weekly charts ===
| Chart (1989) | Peak position |
|---|---|
| Australia (ARIA) | 7 |
| Austria (Ö3 Austria Top 40) | 12 |
| Belgium (Ultratop 50 Flanders) | 13 |
| Canada Top Singles (RPM) | 1 |
| Canada Dance/Urban (RPM) | 9 |
| Europe (Eurochart Hot 100) | 18 |
| Finland (Suomen virallinen lista) | 8 |
| France (SNEP) | 29 |
| Ireland (IRMA) | 4 |
| Italy Airplay (Music & Media) | 2 |
| New Zealand (Recorded Music NZ) | 4 |
| Spain (AFYVE) | 16 |
| Switzerland (Schweizer Hitparade) | 12 |
| UK Singles (Official Charts) | 7 |
| US Billboard Hot 100 | 1 |
| US 12-inch Singles Sales (Billboard) | 17 |
| US Adult Contemporary (Billboard) | 12 |
| US Dance Club Play (Billboard) | 20 |
| US Modern Rock Tracks (Billboard) | 2 |
| US Cash Box Top 100 | 1 |
| West Germany (GfK) | 8 |

=== Year-end charts ===
| Chart (1989) | Position |
|---|---|
| Australia (ARIA) | 53 |
| Belgium (Ultratop) | 94 |
| Canada Top Singles (RPM) | 5 |
| Europe (Eurochart Hot 100) | 99 |
| New Zealand (RIANZ) | 24 |
| US Billboard Hot 100 | 40 |
| US Modern Rock Tracks (Billboard) | 3 |
| West Germany (Media Control) | 55 |

== Release history ==
| Region | Date | Format(s) | Label(s) | Ref(s). |
|---|---|---|---|---|
| United Kingdom | 3 April 1989 | 7-inch vinyl; 12-inch vinyl | London | |
| United Kingdom | 24 April 1989 | 7-inch tin box vinyl; 10-inch vinyl | London | |
| United Kingdom | 1 May 1989 | CD | London | |
| Japan | 1 July 1989 | Mini-CD | London | |

== In popular culture ==
The song was featured in the trailer for Mad Dog and Glory (1993) and in TV spots for Passed Away (1992) Twice during 1998, the song was featured in episodes of Top Gear, first in a used car review of the Volkswagen Golf, with a voiceover by presenter Quentin Willson, the second in the beginning of the review of the Alfa Romeo 166, with scenes showing Alfa Romeo 156s. In 2007, the song was used in adverts for the Chevrolet Captiva (United Kingdom).

The song appears in Doomsday (2008), starring Rhona Mitra, in a surreal scene involving the film's main antagonist. It was also used in the film It's Complicated (2009), in the scene at the graduation party. It plays as Alec Baldwin walks towards Meryl Streep and Steve Martin, after noticing the two are obviously high.
