= Tin Men =

1987 dark comedy film directed by Barry Levinson

- Theatrical release poster
- Directed by: Barry Levinson
- Written by: Barry Levinson
- Produced by: Mark Johnson
- Starring: Richard Dreyfuss; Danny DeVito; Barbara Hershey
- Cinematography: Peter Sova
- Edited by: Stu Linder
- Music by: Fine Young Cannibals
- Production companies: Touchstone Pictures; Silver Screen Partners II
- Distributed by: Buena Vista Distribution
- Release date: March 6, 1987
- Running time: 112 minutes
- Country: United States
- Language: English
- Budget: $11 million
- Box office: $25.4 million

Tin Men is a 1987 American comedy film written and directed by Barry Levinson, produced by Mark Johnson, and starring Richard Dreyfuss, Danny DeVito and Barbara Hershey. It is the second of Levinson's tetralogy of films set in his hometown of Baltimore, Maryland, during the 1940s, 1950s, and 1960s, along with Diner (1982), Avalon (1990) and Liberty Heights (1999).

== Plot ==
Ernest Tilley and Bill "BB" Babowsky are rival door-to-door aluminum siding salesmen in Baltimore, Maryland, in 1963, an era when "tin men", as they are called, will do almost anything, legal or illegal, to close a sale. Both have the required gift of the gab but while BB is a smooth-talking con man who scams naive young women with his sales pitches, Tilley struggles to close his sales.

The men first meet when BB, driving his new Cadillac automobile off the dealer's lot, backs into Tilley's own Cadillac. Though Tilley had the right of way, each man blames the other and an escalating feud erupts between them. After BB smashes Tilley's headlights and Tilley shatters BB's car windows in response, BB sets out to seduce Tilley's long-suffering wife Nora in revenge. Immediately after having sex with Nora, he calls Tilley to taunt him with the news. Tilley tells BB to keep Nora; he wants to be rid of her.

Meanwhile, both men have their own personal troubles. BB's older partner and mentor, Moe Adams, is hospitalized with a serious heart condition. Tilley has a gambling problem and squanders what little money he makes betting on horse races, causing a rift with Nora. He is in debt to various creditors and the IRS, which begins confiscating his possessions for unpaid property taxes. Exhausted by their rivalry, the two men decide to play a game of pool to decide who should get Nora in order to end their personal war. BB loses but he does not honor the bet. He has fallen in love for the first time,and Nora moves in with him.

The newly formed Maryland Home Improvement Commission is investigating corrupt sales practices in the home improvement industry. Both men are subpoenaed and after giving testimony about their sales practices, the commission takes away both of their licenses. While Tilley gives up his license reluctantly, BB does so willingly. Seeing that Tilley has lost everything, including his car, BB takes pity on him and gives him a ride. Together, the two freshly unemployed men with very similar personalities begin sharing ideas for a new business they can create for themselves.

== Cast ==
- Richard Dreyfuss as Bill "B.B." Babowsky
- Danny DeVito as Ernest Tilley
- Barbara Hershey as Nora Tilley
- John Mahoney as Moe Adams
- Jackie Gayle as Sam
- Stanley Brock as Gil
- Seymour Cassel as "Cheese"
- Bruno Kirby as "Mouse"
- J. T. Walsh as "Wing"
- Richard Portnow as Carly
- Matt Craven as "Looney"
- Alan Blumenfeld as Stanley
- Brad Sullivan as Masters
- Michael Tucker as "Bagel"
- Deirdre O'Connell as Nellie
- Michael Willis as Mr. Shubner
- Tootsie Duvall as Housewife
- Fine Young Cannibals as House Band

== Production ==
Steve Buscemi auditioned for a role.

== Music ==
The group Fine Young Cannibals appears as the house band in a nightclub in the film and contributed four songs to the film's soundtrack, including "Good Thing", which would go on to hit number one on the US Billboard Hot 100 two years later.

== Reception ==
Tin Men received positive reviews from critics. On the review aggregator website Rotten Tomatoes, 82% of 22 critics' reviews are positive. Metacritic, which uses a weighted average, assigned the film a score of 75 out of 100, based on 13 critics, indicating "generally favorable" reviews.
