= Ever Fallen in Love (With Someone You Shouldn't've) =

Single by Buzzcocks

from the album Love Bites
- B-side: "Just Lust"
- Released: September 8, 1978
- Genre: Punk rock; pop punk; power pop; new wave
- Length: 2:40
- Label: United Artists
- Songwriter: Pete Shelley
- Producer: Martin Rushent

Buzzcocks singles chronology
"Love You More" (1978)	"Ever Fallen in Love (With Someone You Shouldn't've)" (1978)	"Promises" (1978)

Official audio
- "Ever Fallen in Love (With Someone You Shouldn't've)" on YouTube

"Ever Fallen in Love (With Someone You Shouldn't've)" is a 1978 song written by Pete Shelley and performed by his group Buzzcocks. It was a number 12 hit on the UK Singles Chart and was included on the album Love Bites.

== Background and writing ==
In November 1977, the Buzzcocks were on a headline tour of the UK. Before a gig at Clouds (also known as the Cavendish Ballroom) in Edinburgh, they stayed the night. Pete Shelley later recalled:

"We were in the Blenheim Guest House with pints of beer, sitting in the TV room half-watching Guys and Dolls. One of the characters, Adelaide, is saying to Marlon Brando's character, 'Wait till you fall in love with someone you shouldn't have.' "I thought, 'fallen in love with someone you shouldn't have?' Hmm, that's good."

The following day, Shelley wrote the lyrics of the song in a van outside the main post office on nearby Waterloo Place. The music followed soon after. In an interview, Shelley said that the song was about a man named Francis Cookson that he lived with for about seven years.

== Music and lyrics ==
The music and lyrics, as well as the singing, belong to Shelley. The song uses the verse-chorus formal pattern and is in the key of E major. Both the verse and the chorus start with C♯ minor chords (sixth degree in E major, and relative minor key of E major), which "give [the song] a distinctly downbeat, edgy feel." The minor chords and the B-major-to-D-major move in the chorus are unusual for a 1970s punk song, yet they contribute to its ear-catching nature, along with the vocal melody. The verses feature a guitar riff and a double stroke tom-tom drum pattern over the E chord. The vocal melody ranges from G#3 to baritone F#4 in the verses and chorus; in the ending, Shelley hits a tenor G4 and then a G#4.

The lyrics consist of two verses (of which one is repeated) and a chorus. According to music critic Mark Deming, "the lyrics owe less to adolescent self-pity than the more adult realization of how much being in love can hurt — and how little one can really do about it."

Pitchfork's Jason Heller described the music by writing, "Guitars seethe and beats clench. Shelley sings like a man whose entire existence hangs by a single frayed nerve."

== Release and reception ==
On September 8, 1978, a single for "Ever Fallen in Love (With Someone You Shouldn't've)" was released and backed with "Just Lust".

The song was ranked at No. 1 among "Tracks of the Year" for 1978 by NME. Critic Ned Raggett describes the song as a "deservedly well-known masterpiece." Mark Deming notes, "Pete Shelley's basic formula in the Buzzcocks was to marry the speed and emotional urgency of punk with the hooky melodies and boy/girl thematics of classic pop/rock. When he applied this thinking to that most classic of pop themes, unrequited teenage love, he crafted one of his most indelible songs, 'Ever Fallen in Love?'" In 2021, it was ranked at No. 276 on Rolling Stone's "Top 500 Best Songs of All Time".

Writing for Pitchfork, Jason Heller called the song "the peak...of the Buzzcocks' legacy", and said that "It’s a tribute not only to the notion that punk can be a thoughtful expression of naked feeling, but to Buzzcocks’ idiosyncratic embrace of the finer points of classic pop songcraft."

== Charts ==
Chart (1978)	Peak position
Ireland (IRMA)	14
UK Singles (OCC)	12

== Certifications ==
Region	Certification	Certified units/sales
United Kingdom (BPI) Buzzcocks version	Platinum	600,000^{‡}
^{‡} Sales+streaming figures based on certification alone.

== Fine Young Cannibals version ==
In 1986, Fine Young Cannibals had a No. 9 UK hit with their version, recorded for the soundtrack of the 1986 film Something Wild. It was later included on the band's album The Raw & the Cooked, released in January 1989. The song was also a top 20 hit in Australia and Germany and a No. 10 hit in Ireland, with its biggest success in South Africa, where it reached number one.

=== Charts ===
Chart (1986–1987)	Peak position
Australia (Kent Music Report)	20
Belgium (Ultratop 50 Flanders)	28
Ireland (IRMA)	10
Netherlands (Dutch Top 40)	35
Netherlands (Single Top 100)	34
New Zealand (Recorded Music NZ)	23
South Africa (Springbok Radio)	1
UK Singles (OCC)	9
US 12-inch Singles Sales (Billboard); Remix	32
US Dance Club Play (Billboard); Remix	11
West Germany (GfK)	19

== Amanda Billing version ==
In 2011, a cover was made by the New Zealand soap opera Shortland Street for their winter season, with a jazzy feel, sung by Amanda Billing, who played Sarah Potts. It paralleled the storyline of her character being pregnant with her ex-husband TK Samuels's child and him having moved on with his fiancée. Her version reached No. 24 in New Zealand.

Chart (2011)	Peak position
New Zealand (Recorded Music NZ)	24

== Other versions ==
- A cover of the song was released as a charity tribute single to DJ John Peel on 21 November 2005. It featured artists including Roger Daltrey (the Who), the Datsuns, the Futureheads, David Gilmour (Pink Floyd), Peter Hook (New Order), Elton John, El Presidente, Robert Plant (Led Zeppelin), Pete Shelley and the Soledad Brothers. The single was supported by Peel's son, Tom Ravenscroft, and proceeds went to Amnesty International.
- American post-hardcore band Thursday covered the song in 2005, for the soundtrack of the video game Tony Hawk's American Wasteland.
- A cover by Pete Yorn appeared on the Shrek 2 soundtrack in 2004.
- Canadian punk rock band Pup performed a version of the song in July 2014 for The A.V. Club's A.V. Undercover series.
- Australian power pop band Moler covered the song in 1997 on their Infatuation EP.
- English rock band YONAKA covered the song in 2024 for My Lady Jane on Amazon Prime Video.
- French cover band Nouvelle Vague covered the song in 2006.
