= Johnny Come Home =

Single by Fine Young Cannibals

from the album Fine Young Cannibals
- B-side: "Good Times and Bad"
- Released: 31 May 1985
- Recorded: 1984
- Genre: Ska
- Label: London Records
- Songwriters: David Steele; Roland Gift
- Producers: Andy Cox; David Steele; Roland Gift

Fine Young Cannibals singles chronology
| "Johnny Come Home" (1985) | "Blue" (1985) |

"Johnny Come Home" is a song by British band Fine Young Cannibals, released as the first single from their debut album, Fine Young Cannibals (1985). It is similar to the style of many other of the band's hits, a mixture of rock and ska with Roland Gift's distinctive vocals, as well as a jazz-type trumpet solo. It was released in May 1985 by London Records and was one of the group's most popular hits. The song tells the gritty realistic story of a runaway youth, and alternates from the first-person narrative, explaining how his arrival in the big city has not turned out as he expected, to the view of the parents in the chorus, expressing their wish that he would come home.

== Chart performance ==
Although it failed to reach the top 40 in the United States, stalling at No. 76, along with the track, "Blue", "Johnny Come Home" reached No. 9 on the Billboard dance chart. The track was a good start for the group in their native United Kingdom, peaking at No. 8 on the UK Singles Chart in July 1985.

== Reception ==
David Bennun from Melody Maker wrote, "I can particularly recommend 'Johnny Come Home', FYC's first and best hit, which was far more revealing of their roots in the British ska scene than anything that followed; notably they had the nous to borrow not from their own former combo, The Beat, but from the much superior Specials. 'Johnny' was brisk, poignant and discreetly political, elevated by a desolate, roving trumpet and Roland Gift's plaintive, mannered vocal, and they never topped it." John Leland called it, "dark, eerie dance music. 'Johnny' puts a little Suicide creepiness, some fake opera, muted trumpet, and spare, pumping piano into a groove that moves on its keyboard bass." Spin called it, "an easy skittish ska-ish tune with an underlying urgency. Jazzy muted trumpet solo bops along with solid guitar. Plus Gift's instrument of a voice is gonna stick (splat!) like glue to your brain as you find yourself hummin' the refrain."

== Charts ==
| Chart (1985) | Peak position |
|---|---|
| Australia (ARIA) | 14 |
| Canada Top Singles (RPM) | 16 |
| Belgium (Ultratop 50 Flanders) | 8 |
| Finland (Suomen virallinen lista) | 26 |
| Ireland (IRMA) | 10 |
| Israel (IBA) | 6 |
| Italy (Musica e dischi) | 5 |
| Netherlands (Dutch Top 40) | 21 |
| Netherlands (Single Top 100) | 10 |
| New Zealand (Recorded Music NZ) | 13 |
| UK Singles (OCC) | 8 |
| US Billboard Hot 100 | 76 |
| West Germany (Official German Charts) | 16 |

== Popular culture ==
- In later years the song's title would serve as the title for a Jake Arnott novel published in 2006 whose plot line is reminiscent of the themes discussed in the song.
