= Roland Gift =

British singer-songwriter and actor (born 1961)

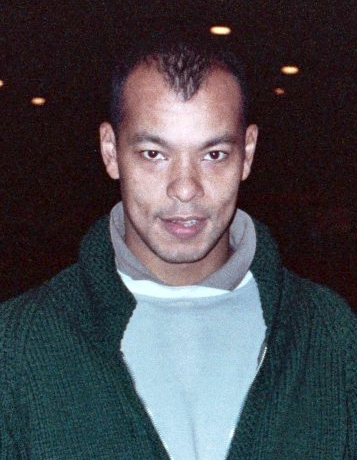
- Gift pictured at a Grammy rehearsal in 1990
- Born: Roland Lee Gift; 28 May 1961 (age 65); Birmingham, Warwickshire, England
- Occupations: Singer; songwriter; actor
- Years active: 1978−present
- Known for: Member of Fine Young Cannibals and Akrylykz
- Spouse: Louise (died 2019)
- Children: 2

Roland Lee Gift (born 28 May 1961) is a British singer, songwriter, and actor. He is the former lead vocalist of the pop rock band Fine Young Cannibals and the ska band Akrylykz.

== Early life ==
Gift was born on 28 May 1961 in the Sparkhill district of Birmingham to an English mother and an Afro-Caribbean father. He lived in Sparkhill until the age of 11, receiving his early formal education at Anderton Park School and Arden Primary School.

== Music career ==
Gift's first recording was as a saxophonist with Akrylykz, a ska band from Hull. The album was the second release on York's Red Rhino Records. Although this record was unsuccessful, it did bring him to the attention of Andy Cox and David Steele of the Beat. Akrylykz toured with the Beat.

Cox and Steele asked Gift to become the lead singer of their new band, Fine Young Cannibals, after the Beat had disbanded. Fine Young Cannibals' eponymous debut album was released in 1985, spawning two UK hit singles, "Johnny Come Home" and a cover of Elvis Presley's "Suspicious Minds". The band released the singles "She Drives Me Crazy" and "Good Thing" from the 1989 album The Raw & the Cooked; both songs reached #1 in the United States. In 1990, the band won two Brit Awards: Best British Group and Best British Album (for The Raw & the Cooked).

Gift has performed as a solo artist, appearing at the Rewind Festival in Henley.

He also appeared in Jools Holland's 20th annual Hootenanny show, which aired overnight on BBC2 on 31 December 2012/1 January 2013, the last to be recorded at BBC Television Centre. Gift sang the Fine Young Cannibals hits "Good Thing" and "Suspicious Minds". Gift was a guest vocalist on Jools Holland's 2013 tour.

Ten years after his first Hootenanny appearance, Gift re-appeared in Jools Holland's annual Hootenanny show again, which aired overnight on BBC2 on 31 December 2022/1 January 2023. Gift sang the Fine Young Cannibals hits "Suspicious Minds" and "Good Thing". Gift announced a two-show tour in 2025 billed as "Roland Gift Presents Fine Young Cannibals".

== Acting career ==
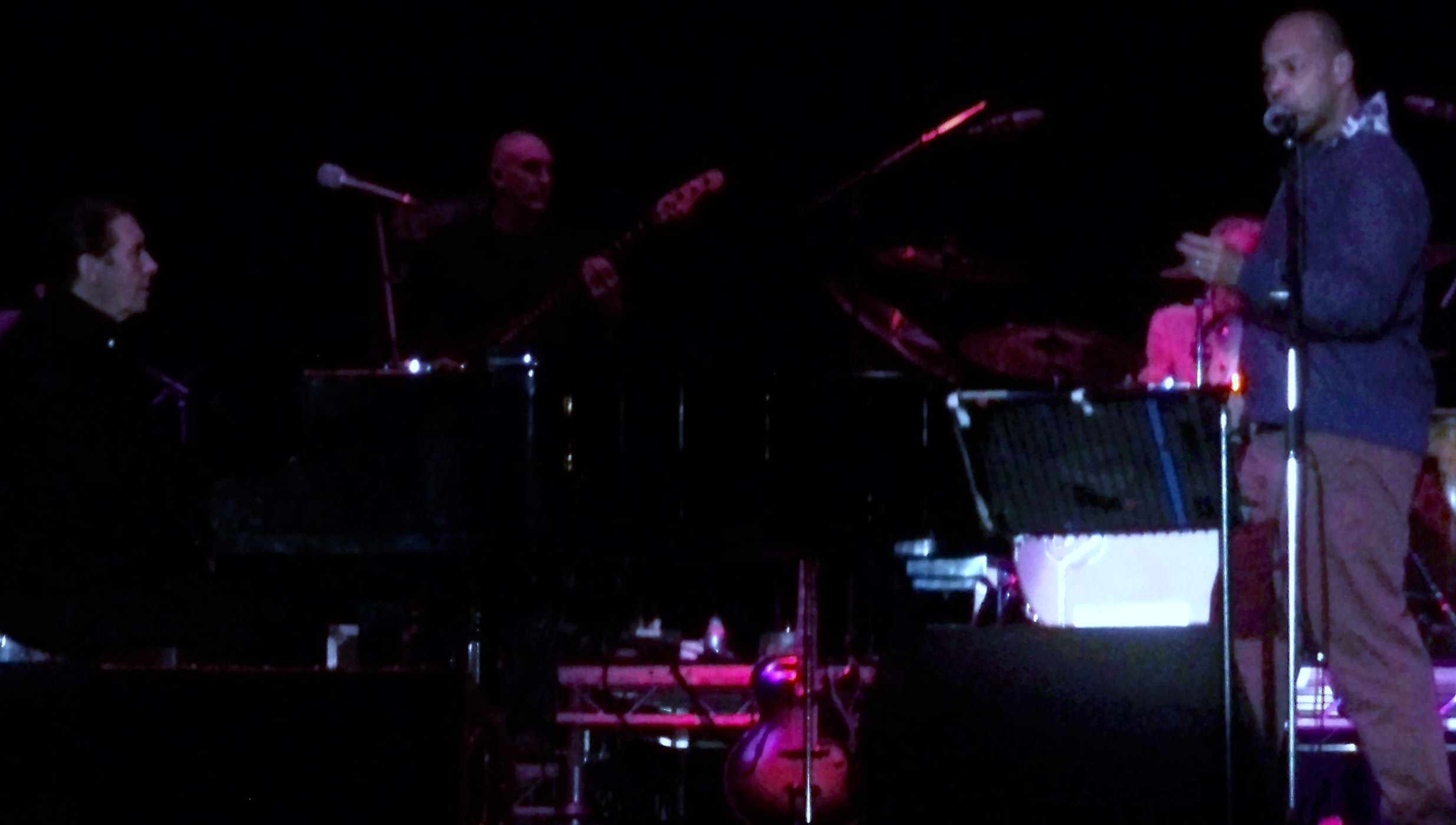
Roland Gift at Guilfest 2011

Gift had his first screen role in a Clash movie (he was a roadie for them at the time), and also appeared in Out of Order the same year. In 1989, he portrayed Johnny Edgecombe in the British feature film Scandal. In 1990, he did his first stage work, playing Romeo in the Hull Truck Theatre's production of Shakespeare's Romeo and Juliet, a production which had a brief run in the United States at the Staller Center for the Arts. He also appeared as a lounge singer (singing songs that were included in the Fine Young Cannibals' album The Raw and the Cooked) in the 1987 film Tin Men, directed by Barry Levinson.

Gift would go on to appear in five episodes of Highlander:The Series as the character Xavier St. Cloud.

In 2020, he starred as Johnny Holloway, an ex-pop star sent to prison, in the BBC Radio 4 musical drama Return to Vegas. Gift wrote the play and co-composed the music together with Ben Barson, brother of Madness's Mike Barson.

== Personal life ==
Gift has two sons. His wife Louise died in 2019.

== Discography ==
=== Albums ===
Year	Information
Roland Gift	Released: 18 March 2002; Formats: CD, digital download

=== Singles ===
Year	Single	UK Singles Chart	Album
2002	"It's Only Money"	123	Roland Gift
2009	"Crushed" (as Roland Lee Gift)	—	Non-album single

== Filmography ==
=== Film ===
Year	Title	Role	Notes
1987	Tin Men	Band Member	
1987	Sammy and Rosie Get Laid	Danny	
1987	Out of Order	Customer	
1989	Scandal	Johnny Edgecombe	
2001	The Island of the Mapmaker's Wife	Bernard Ivens	
2002	Ten Minutes Older	Co-Pilot	Segment: "Addicted to the Stars"
2006	Money	The Man	Short film
2016	Brakes	Rhys	

=== Television ===
Year	Title	Role	Notes
1993	Heartbeat	Ken Marston	Episode: "Over the Hill"
1993–1997	Highlander: The Series	Xavier St. Cloud	5 episodes
1997	Painted Lady	Eddie Mullen	
2021	Meet the Richardsons	Roland Gift	2 episodes
