= David Steele (musician) =

English musician (born 1960)

- Steele with Fine Young Cannibals at the 32nd Annual Grammy Awards in Los Angeles, California, 1990

Background information
- Born: 8 September 1960 (age 66); Cowes, Isle of Wight, England
- Genres: New wave; ska
- Occupation: Musician
- Instruments: Bass guitar; piano; synthesizer; drum machine
- Years active: 1978–present
- Labels: Go Feet; Sony BMG
- Formerly of: The Beat; Fine Young Cannibals; Fried
- Website: David Steele on Myspace

David "Shuffle" Steele (born 8 September 1960) is a British musician who was a member of the bands the Beat and Fine Young Cannibals.

== Early life ==
Steele was born in Cowes, Isle of Wight, England. Steele moved from Blackgang Chine to Birmingham to train as a mental health nurse at All Saints' Hospital, Winson Green, whilst also playing bass guitar for the newly formed ska band the Beat.

== Career ==
From 1978 to 1983, Steele was bassist in the 2 Tone ska revival band the Beat, (known in the US as the English Beat). After Ranking Roger and Dave Wakeling left the Beat to form General Public, Steele and guitarist Andy Cox recruited singer Roland Gift to form Fine Young Cannibals, whose career lasted into the early 1990s. In 1988, while FYC were on hiatus, Cox and Steele released the instrumental house music single, "Tired of Getting Pushed Around", under the name of Two Men, a Drum Machine and a Trumpet. It reached No. 18 on the UK Singles Chart. That same year, they also collaborated with Wee Papa Girl Rappers on the single "Heat It Up" which reached No. 21.

Steele's bass lines in the Beat took the Jamaican style of ska and added a harder, punk rock-influenced style. The Beat song, "Mirror in the Bathroom", is largely built on top of the driving, eighth-note bass line that runs through the entire song. Fine Young Cannibals had a more soulful, and sometimes electronic sound, and Steele's bass lines were less prominent in the outfit.

Steele has co-written songs for both the Beat and Fine Young Cannibals, most notably "She Drives Me Crazy", "Good Thing" and "I'm Not the Man I Used to Be". The group disbanded in 1992, but reunited briefly to record a new song for their The Finest compilation album in 1996.

After the end of his work with Fine Young Cannibals, Steele went on to play a variety of other roles in the music industry. He co-produced two tracks on Gabrielle's album Find Your Way, which reached No. 8 on the UK Albums Chart in 1993, as well as the soundtrack to the film The Truth About Cats & Dogs in 1996. He has appeared on more than two dozen other albums, most commonly as a backing vocalist, but also as a guitarist, drummer and mixer.

In summer 2004, he released the album Fried, on which he collaborated with the New Orleans vocalist, Jonte Short. The album was a mix of soul, funk and R&B. Fried signed to Sony BMG and their album was re-packaged and re-released with a modified tracklisting and running order, including some 3 new tracks replacing the last 2 of the original tracks, as the album Things Change, released in 2007.

== Personal life ==
Steele spent some time residing in the French Quarter of New Orleans, but he relocated to London.

== See also ==
- List of bass guitarists
