= From Monday to Sunday =

Studio album by Nick Heyward
- Released: 7 December 1993
- Recorded: Shaw Sound (Fulham), Lilley Yard
- Genres: Rock, pop, alternative, indie
- Length: 48:51
- Label: Epic
- Producer: Nick Heyward

Nick Heyward chronology
I Love You Avenue (1988)	From Monday to Sunday (1993)	Tangled (1995)

Singles from From Monday to Sunday
- 1. "Kite"; 2. "He Doesn't Love You Like I Do"

Professional ratings
Review scores
Source	Rating
AllMusic	3/5 stars
Hot Press	8/12

From Monday to Sunday is the fourth solo album by English singer-songwriter Nick Heyward. It was released in 1993 through Epic Records and produced two singles, ‘’Kite’’ (#44 in the UK Singles Chart, No. 4 in Billboard’s Hot Modern Rock Tracks chart) and ‘’He Doesn't Love You Like I Do’’ (#58 in the UK Singles Chart).

== Recording and production ==
The album was produced by Heyward and recorded at Shaw Sound studio in Fulham and Hans Zimmer and Stanley Myers’ Lillie Yard Studio.

== Track listing ==
All tracks are written by Nick Heyward.

No.	Title	Length
1.	"He Doesn't Love You Like I Do"	2:47
2.	"Kite"	3:05
3.	"Into Your Life"	3:19
4.	"Caravan"	3:42
5.	"Ordinary People"	3:42
6.	"How Do You Live Without Sunshine"	8:14
7.	"January Man"	4:02
8.	"Mr. Plain"	4:26
9.	"These Words"	3:15
10.	"All I Want You to Know"	2:50
11.	"Diary"	4:35
12.	"Everytime"	4:54
Total length:		48:51

== Personnel ==
Credits are adapted from the album's liner notes.

- Nick Heyward – vocals, acoustic guitar
- Blair Booth – backing vocals
- Anthony Clark – keyboards, Hammond organ, backing vocals
- Geoff Dugmore – percussion
- Andy Duncan – percussion
- Richard Edwards – trombone
- Julian Gordon-Hastings – drum programming
- Les Nemes – bass guitar, guitar, drum programming
- Bob Sargeant – backing vocals
- Frank Schaefer – cello
- Neil Scott – guitar
- Ian Shaw – drum programming
- Steve Sidwell – trumpet
- Trevor Smith – drums
- Julian Stringle – clarinet
- Phil Taylor – organ, piano
- Ali Thompson – drum programming
- Graham Ward – drums
- Jimmy Williams – backing vocals, mandolin, slide guitar

Production

- Nick Heyward – record producer
- Julian Gordon-Hastings – engineer, recording
- Ian Shaw – recording
- Denis Blackham – mastering
- Dave Bascombe – mixing
