= Postcards from Home =

Studio album by Nick Heyward
- Released: October 1986
- Recorded: Oasis Studios, Marcus Recording Studios, Mayfair Studios, PRT Studios
- Genres: Pop; new wave
- Length: 39:08
- Label: Arista
- Producer: Graham Sacher

Nick Heyward chronology
North of a Miracle (1983)	Postcards from Home (1986)	I Love You Avenue (1988)

Singles from Postcards from Home
- 1. "Over the Weekend" Released: April 1986; 2. "Goodbye Yesterday" Released: June 1986

Professional ratings
Review scores
Source	Rating
AllMusic	4/5 stars

Postcards from Home is the second solo album by English singer-songwriter Nick Heyward. It was released in October 1986 through Arista Records and produced two UK chart singles, ‘’Over the Weekend’’ (#43) and ‘’Goodbye Yesterday’’ (#82).

== Recording and production ==
The album was produced by Heyward's manager, Graham Sacher, and recorded at four studios: Oasis, Marcus, Mayfair and PRT.

== Track listing ==
All tracks are written by Nick Heyward.

Side one
No.	Title	Length
1.	"Move It Up"	3:55
2.	"Over the Weekend"	3:57
3.	"Goodbye Yesterday"	3:55
4.	"Again in My Heart"	2:52
5.	"We've All Been Kissed"	4:04
Total length:		18:46

Side two
No.	Title	Length
6.	"Pray for a Miracle"	4:50
7.	"Now You've Gone"	3:55
8.	"Come On Baby Run"	3:55
9.	"Teach Till You Reach"	3:52
10.	"Cry Just a Bit"	3:53
Total length:		20:27

CD bonus tracks
No.	Title	Length
11.	"Love All Day (And Night) (12" Version)"	5:31
12.	"Warning Sign (12" Version)"	5:48
13.	"Over The Weekend (And Into The Cornfield Part Two)"	5:28
14.	"Goodbye Yesterday (12" Version)"	6:29
15.	"Fantastic Day (Live at Wembley Stadium, 28/6/86)"	6:11
16.	"Take That Situation (Live at Wembley Stadium, 28/6/86)"	3:35
Total length:		32:47

== Personnel ==
Credits are adapted from the album's liner notes.

- Nick Heyward – vocals, electric guitar, acoustic guitar, design
- Peter Beckett – keyboards, backing vocals
- Chris Cameron – backing vocals
- Richard Cottle – keyboards, saxophone
- Blair Cunningham – drums
- Graham Edwards – bass guitar
- Steve Everett – drum programming, percussion
- Isaac Guillory – acoustic guitar, Spanish guitar
- Stevie Lange – backing vocals
- Keith More – guitar
- Charlie Morgan – drums
- Les Nemes – bass guitar
- Mike Parker – keyboards
- Neil Sidwell – trombone
- Steve Sidwell – trumpet
- Phil Smith – saxophone
- Paul Spong – trumpet
- Miriam Stockley – backing vocals
- Ali Thompson – backing vocals
- Paul Westwood – bass guitar

Production

- Graham Sacher – record producer
- Alan Leeming – engineer
- John Etchels – engineer
- John Gallen – engineer
- Tim O’Sullivan – photography
- SPIRY – mastering
- Simon Halfon – design
