= Paint and Paint =

- LP cover (HCLP1)

Studio album by Haircut One Hundred
- Released: 6 July 1984
- Recorded: The Roundhouse, AIR and Jacob's Studios, England
- Genre: New wave
- Label: Polydor
- Producer: Bob Sargeant, John Punter, Mark Dearnley, Haircut One Hundred

Haircut One Hundred chronology
Pelican West (1982)	Paint and Paint (1984)

Professional ratings
Review scores
Source	Rating
AllMusic	2/5 stars

Paint and Paint is the second studio album by the British new wave band Haircut One Hundred, released in 1984 by Polydor Records. It was their only album released after the early 1983 departure of lead singer Nick Heyward. As a result, the band's percussionist, Marc Fox, assumed lead vocal duties. The band's longtime drummer Blair Cunningham performs on the album, but was not listed as an official member.

Unlike the band's first album, Paint and Paint was not a commercial success and failed to chart, and none of the singles released from it reached the UK top 40.

== Track listing ==
1. "Fish in a Bowl"
2. "Immaterial"
3. "So Tired"
4. "Hidden Years"
5. "40-40 Home"
6. "High Noon"
7. "Too Up, Two Down"
8. "Benefit of the Doubt"
9. "Prime Time"
10. "Where Do You Run to Now?"
11. "Infatuation"

All tracks written by Marc Fox, Les Nemes, Graham Jones and Phil Smith, except "Where Do You Run to Now?" written by Steve French and Marc Fox.

=== Double CD reissue (1999,2017) ===
Disc 1
No.	Title	Length
1.	"Fish in a Bowl"	3:31
2.	"Immaterial"	4:09
3.	"So Tired"	4:14
4.	"The Hidden Years"	3:28
5.	"40-40 Home"	4:03
6.	"High Noon"	3:42
7.	"Too Up Two Down"	3:53
8.	"Benefit of the Doubt"	4:40
9.	"Prime Time"	3:54
10.	"Where Do You Run to Now?"	4:20
11.	"Infatuation"	5:16
12.	"Too Up Two Down (7" Remix)"	3:55
13.	"Evil Smokestacking Baby"	4:32
14.	"After It's All Been Said and Done"	2:50
15.	"Prime Time (Late Night Shopping Version)"	6:27
Total length:		62:56

Disc 2
No.	Title	Length
1.	"So Tired (Extended Version - Long Slumber)"	6:05
2.	"Fish in a Bowl (Deeper Version)"	4:53
3.	"Hidden Years Extra (Development Mix)"	3:21
4.	"Fish in a Bowl (No Vocal - Development Mix)"	2:59
5.	"High Noon (No Vocal - Development Mix)"	3:36
6.	"Infatuation (No Vocal - Development Mix)"	5:18
7.	"One Word (Development Mix)"	4:14
8.	"Prime Time (No Vocal - Development Mix)"	4:25
9.	"Puppet Man (Development Mix)"	3:56
10.	"Ted And Harry (Development Mix)"	2:30
11.	"Too Up Two Down (Development Mix)"	4:04
12.	"40-40 Home (BBC David Jensen Session)"	4:13
13.	"Immaterial (BBC David Jensen Session)"	3:45
14.	"High Noon (BBC David Jensen Session)"	3:20
15.	"Hidden Years (BBC David Jensen Session)"	3:01
Total length:		59:42

== UK singles ==
=== "Prime Time" ===
- Release Date: 1983
- UK Chart: 46
- Notes: HC1 and HCX1 came in special carry bags.

7" (HC1):

1. "Prime Time"
2. "Too Up Two Down"

7" picture disc (HCP1):

1. "Prime Time"
2. "Too Up Two Down"

12" (HCX1):

1. "Prime Time (Late Night Shopping Version)"
2. "Too Up Two Down"

=== "So Tired" ===
- Release Date: 1983
- UK Chart: 94

7" (HC2):

1. "So Tired"
2. "Fish in a Bowl"

7" mirror disc (HCP2):

1. "So Tired"
2. "Fish in a Bowl"

12" (HCX2):

1. "So Tired (Long Slumber)"
2. "So Tired (Forty Winks)"
3. "Fish in a Bowl (Deeper Version)"

=== "Too Up Two Down" ===
- Release Date: 1984
- UK Chart: -

7" (HC3):

1. "Too Up, Two Down"
2. "Evil Smokestacking Baby"

12" (HCX3):

1. "Too Up, Two Down"
2. "Evil Smokestacking Baby"
3. "After It's All Been Said And Done"

== Personnel ==
Haircut 100

- Les Nemes – bass
- Graham Jones – guitar
- Phil Smith – soprano, alto, and tenor saxophones; glockenspiel
- Marc Fox – percussion (timbales, congas, tubular bells, timpani), vocals

Other musicians

- Blair Cunningham – drums, percussion
- Graham Ward – drums, percussion
- Steve French – piano and keyboards
- Richard Cottle – keyboards
- Guy Barker – trumpet, flugelhorn
- Steve Sidwell – trumpet
- Pete Beechill – trombone
- Spike Edney – trombone
- Vince Sullivan – trombone
