= Standage =

Standage is a surname. Notable people with the surname include:

- Simon Standage (born 1941), English violinist and conductor
- Tom Standage (born 1969), British journalist
