= North of a Miracle =

Studio album by Nick Heyward
- Released: 21 October 1983
- Recorded: 19 May 1983 – 26 July 1983
- Studios: Abbey Road and Air Studios, London
- Genres: Pop; new wave
- Length: 39:57
- Label: Arista
- Producer: Geoff Emerick · Nick Heyward

Nick Heyward chronology
Haircut 100 – Pelican West (1982)	North of a Miracle (1983)	Postcards from Home (1986)

Singles from North of a Miracle
- 1. "Whistle Down the Wind"; 2. "Take That Situation"; 3. "Blue Hat for a Blue Day"; 4. "On a Sunday"

Professional ratings
Review scores
Source	Rating
AllMusic	4.5/5 stars
Rolling Stone	3/5 stars
Smash Hits	8/10

North of a Miracle is the debut solo album by English singer-songwriter Nick Heyward. It was released on 21 October 1983 through Arista Records and spent 10 weeks on the UK Albums Chart, peaking at number 10.

The album produced four UK singles, "Whistle Down the Wind", "Take That Situation", "Blue Hat for a Blue Day" and "On a Sunday".

In the United States, the album peaked in the Billboard 200 at number 178 and remained on the chart for four weeks. On the Cash Box album chart, it spent a total of eight weeks, peaking at number 170. The single "Whistle Down the Wind" peaked at No. 20 on the Billboard Adult Contemporary chart in early 1984.

== Recording and production ==
The album was recorded from May to June 1983 at Abbey Road Studios and produced by Geoff Emerick and Nick Heyward. The original U.S. vinyl pressing significantly altered the running order of the songs, with only 3 songs (1, 2 & 6) maintaining their original positions.

== Critical reception ==
Contemporary critics gave North of a Miracle generally positive reviews, with Smash Hits awarding it eight out of ten, calling it "a corker of an album". In Rolling Stone, Parke Puterbaugh gave the album three out of five stars and described it as "a cause for celebration".

Retrospective assessments have also been positive. John Earls of Classic Pop awarded the 2025 reissue four stars and wrote that the original album represented a natural progression from Pelican West, retaining Haircut One Hundred's energy while showing Heyward developing as a songwriter. Earls particularly highlighted "On a Sunday" and "The Day It Rained Forever", and praised Geoff Emerick's production for largely avoiding dated 1980s production techniques.

Sean Hannam, writing for Super Deluxe Edition, described the album as "surprisingly mature and ambitious", characterising it as a cinematic and colourful collection which combined brassy, soulful pop and jazz-influenced arrangements with a more melancholy side heard on songs including "Blue Hat for a Blue Day", "Whistle Down the Wind" and "The Day It Rained Forever".

"Whistle Down the Wind" was described as one of Heyward's most moving songs by Michael Sutton for AllMusic. He found the album as charming and catchy as his best work with Haircut One Hundred, while noting that much of the record was more mature and introspective.

== Track listing ==
All tracks are written by Nick Heyward.

No.	Title	Length
1.	"When It Started to Begin"	3:48
2.	"Blue Hat for a Blue Day"	4:03
3.	"Two Make It True"	4:20
4.	"On a Sunday"	4:01
5.	"Club Boy at Sea"	3:50
6.	"Whistle Down the Wind"	3:39
7.	"Take That Situation"	3:18
8.	"The Kick of Love"	4:35
9.	"The Day It Rained Forever"	4:34
10.	"Atlantic Monday"	5:09
Total length:		39:57

=== Reissues ===
Release	Format	Additional material
2010 Cherry Red expanded edition	2CD	Four B-sides added to disc one ("Don't Get Me Wrong", "Stolen Tears", "Café Canada" and "Love at the Door"); disc two contains the 1983 Dominion Theatre concert plus alternate versions, remixes and instrumentals.
2025 Demon/Edsel deluxe edition	3CD	Disc one contains the original album; disc two, Heyward and the North: 1983, collects mixes, instrumentals and B-sides; disc three, Recordings: 1984, collects Heyward's 1984 singles and associated recordings, including three previously unreleased tracks.

=== U.S. track listing ===
No.	Title	Length
1.	"When It Started to Begin"	3:43
2.	"Blue Hat for a Blue Day"	3:56
3.	"Take That Situation"	3:13
4.	"Two Make It True"	4:17
5.	"On a Sunday"	3:52
6.	"Whistle Down the Wind"	3:35
7.	"Atlantic Monday"	5:01
8.	"Club Boy at Sea"	3:44
9.	"The Kick of Love"	4:29
10.	"The Day It Rained Forever"	4:27
Total length:		38:57

(Note: all U.S. track timings listed as slightly shorter on original U.S. LP labels – Arista AL 8 8106)

== Personnel ==
Credits are adapted from the album's liner notes.

- Nick Heyward – record producer, vocals, electric guitar, acoustic guitar, brass arrangements
- Pete Beachill – trombone
- Stuart Brooks – flugelhorn, trumpet
- Andrew Brown – bass guitar
- Paul Buckmaster – string arrangements
- Brian Gascoigne – piano
- Ian Laws – guitar
- Bill Le Sage – piano
- Tony Maronie – bongo drum, percussion
- Dave Mattacks – drums
- Steve Nieve – organ, piano
- Pino Palladino – bass guitar
- Morris Pert – marimba, percussion
- Andrew Powell – conductor, orchestral arrangements
- Tim Renwick – electric guitar, acoustic guitar, mandolin
- Danny Schogger – accordion, organ, piano
- Chris White – saxophone

Production

- Geoff Emerick – record producer, engineer
- Jon Jacobs – assistant engineer
- David Botterell – photography, management
