= Luna (TV series) =

- Country of origin: United Kingdom
- Original language: English
- No. of series: 2
- No. of episodes: 12

Production
- Production locations: ATV Elstree Studios; East Midlands Television Centre
- Production company: Central Independent Television

Original release
- Network: ITV
- Release: 1983 – 1984

Luna was a British children's science fiction TV comedy show produced by Central Television for the ITV network which ran for two series in 1983 and 1984. The first series was recorded at the former ATV studios in Elstree, the second at their Nottingham facility.

== Premise ==
Luna was also the name used by the show's two central characters, the first played by Patsy Kensit (1st series) and a replacement by Joanna Wyatt (2nd series). Luna was co-written by Colin Prockter and Colin Bennett; Bennett also acted in it. The show was created and produced by Micky Dolenz of the pop group the Monkees. Dolenz said that the idea for Luna dated back to the late sixties and was based on his daughter Ami; the idea only came into being after he had met Colin Bennett in Hollywood. The character 80H was played by Roy Macready and U2 by Bob Goody.

The show was about the domestic life of an eccentric family group set in the year 2040 in sector 80 of a colony named the Efficicity, although in the setting the characters are not in fact biologically related but assigned to shared living quarters by the bureaucracy. Parts of the setting were decidedly dystopic; in the first episode, Luna is threatened with execution for having lost her citizen's identity card.

A distinctive feature of the show was the language of "techno-talk", used by all of the characters and described as an alternative version of English that had emerged to make it easier for computers to understand human speech. Techno-talk was characterised by the formation of new words from stems that already existed in regular spoken English. It also had echoes of George Orwell's Newspeak, albeit that it had been created for a different purpose. For example, the characters live in a "habiviron" (from habitat and environment); similarly, school is "eduviron"; a child is a "diminibeing" (abbreviated to "dimini") and "regrets!" and "gratitudes!" replace "sorry" and "thank you".

The first season was repeated in the weeks immediately prior the broadcast of the second season, but the programme has not been repeated since then.

== Characters ==
- Luna (1st series: 72-batch-19Y) - a female "diminibeing". Luna is kind and demure; having been raised in a "dimini colony", she knows very little about the old world but is curious to learn about it and keen to fit in with the others. Andy likes her for the "civilising influence" she brings to the habiviron. Luna was given her name by Andy, because she asked for one; Andy chose it because she was "batched" on the moon.
- Luna (2nd series) a different character from the above, intended as a replacement - the original Luna has left and so the habiviron is assigned a new diminifemale at the start of the second season, but she adopts the same name as her predecessor. Although equally as kind-hearted as her predecessor, she has a somewhat less demure and more lively and outgoing personality.
- Brat (3G-batch-19Y) - a geeky male diminibeing. Brat is younger than Luna, and extremely intelligent and technical; he can fix most of the machines in the habiviron if necessary. Unfortunately, he is also extremely spoiled and selfish; he has made attempts to have both Andy and Luna replaced (Andy with a newer model android and Luna with a male diminibeing) and Jazzmine returned to her abusive owner the Clunkman. He is also ignorant about the old world, but unlike Luna, he actively refuses to learn about it or co-operate with the adults; he even persistently insists on using code numbers to identify the other characters (calling Luna "72" and Andy "CB"). Brat was given his name by Gramps during one of their arguments; neither he nor Luna actually knows what the word means. He does eventually bond with both Luna and Jazzmine when each turns out to be proficient in his favourite computer game Laser Blaser Phasers and later starts to rebel against 80H by playing pranks on him.
- Gramps (WB1889U) - an aging punk, and the original inhabitant of Habiviron Jo-Y. He grew up in the old world and often has difficulty understanding the other characters' use of techno-talk, which he hardly ever uses himself (Andy generally translates for him). He does not particularly like having to share his habiviron with diminibeings, but tolerates them regardless. He has a large stash of old world artifacts (such as teapots, rubik cubes, Monopoly games, etc.) in his bedroom, which are now considered illegal. He never uses code numbers, and cannot even remember his own; he introduces himself to Brat and Luna as "Gramps".
- Andy (CB1979D) - the habiviron's malfunction-prone android. Andy is an outdated model of android; the habiviron is entitled to receive a newer one, but Gramps keeps Andy around since he knows Andy will tolerate his "inefficient" ways. Andy is familiar with the old world, and frequently quotes from Shakespeare or other historical literature, which most of the other characters (even Gramps) don't recognize. Andy was given his name by Gramps, because he is an android; he also uses the name "CB".
- Mother (1984726SD) - the habiviron's computer, who runs all the standard functions of the habiviron and keeps Andy charged. Mother is Andy's nickname for her, she hates it.
- Jazzmine - Luna's alien pet; a "little simple" (from the planet Sim). Luna rescued Jazzmine from mistreatment at the hands of a travelling junk trader. Although unable to speak human language (although Luna appears to understand her and sometimes her meaning is implied with tone of voice), Jazzmine can perform some complex tasks, and has healing powers.
- 80H - the sector "bureaubeing". 80H is in charge of the whole sector, including resource allocation and law enforcement, and has ultimate power (including the power of life and death) over every being in Sector 80 of the Efficicity. He's addressed as "your burificence" and his arrival at the habiviron is always proceeded by a fanfare provided by Mother; he wears a shiny black suit with a black full-face helmet and speaks in a harsh ring-modulated voice. Underneath the helmet, though, is a regular, balding and stressed-out office worker; he finds the helmet uncomfortable and only wears it when required by official business. 80H is in fact quite kindly (albeit somewhat of a jobsworth) and, like most of the adult characters, remembers and has a certain amount of affection for the old world; unfortunately, the demands of his employers ("the central bureaubureau") often conflict with this. Many of the other adult characters appear to have known him in the old world, and still use his old name ("Sid"), which he hates.
- 40D - 80H's ditzy assistant (1st season).
- 32C - 80H's assistant (2nd season).

== Episodes ==
=== Series 1 ===
No. overall	No. in season	Title	Original release date
1	1	"Habiviron, Sweet Habiviron"	TBA
Brat, and later Luna, arrive at the habiviron Jo-Y. Gramps is rather upset at having to share his home with children (and particularly dislikes Brat), and is already in trouble with 80H for having been caught with an old world teapot, which is now illegal to possess. When 80H visits to check on the new arrivals, Luna finds she's lost her egothenticity card; Andy attempts to hide this from 80H, but fails and 80H tells Luna she will need to show him the card within 24 hours or be "obliviated". Andy and Luna search for the card, but find no help: the sector's lost property officer insists that it cannot be lost because he doesn't know where it is, and the sector police suggest it may have been stolen but refuse to help because Luna cannot prove her identity (due to not having her card). Gramps is summoned to 80H's, where he appeals to "Sid" to have one last cup of tea; 80H relents, but afterwards the illegal teapot is thrown into the obliviator. Gramps rails angrily at the idea that 80H would do this to Luna, and 80H admits he does not relish the task, but is required to follow instructions to the letter. Time runs out, and Luna visits 80Hs to report on this; the obliviator door is opened for her to enter, when Brat runs up, holding the card to give to 80H. Brat reports that the card was "in the secret pouch in Luna's zipclad", but it is strongly implied that Brat stole it and later regretted this. Luna is saved, and 80H puts the card under his chair to stop it wobbling. Luna also retrieves the teapot from the obliviator which 80H is happy to use as a birthday present for his nagging wife.
2	2	"The Clunkman Cometh"	TBA
"The Clunkman", a junk merchant, visits the habiviron. Brat plans to sell him Andy in exchange for a robot goldfish, knowing that a new android will be supplied; however, Luna intervenes to prevent this. She is also shocked at The Clunkman's treatment of his pet alien; so much so that, after he has left, she teleports onto his ship and kidnaps the alien, naming it Jazzmine. The Clunkman goes to visit 80H to report the missing alien; 80H is suffering from toothache, and cannot believe Luna would do such a thing, but he agrees to investigate anyway (in exchange for some contraband old world sweets). Brat reports Jazzmine's presence at the habiviron to 80H, who tells Luna that aliens cannot legally be kept in a static habiviron and goes to get the Clunkman to pick her up. When he arrives, Luna begs 80H to allow Jazzmine to stay, and Jazzmine uses her healing powers to cure 80H's toothache. 80H agrees that she can stay, but the Clunkman still insists that she belongs to him, and thus wants her back or else to be given something in exchange. He initially wants Andy, but he eventually accepts one of Gramps' old world LPs (Pelican West by Haircut 100). Jazzmine and Brat eventually bond.
3	3	"All The World's A Teletalk Linkup"	TBA
The Bureau has decided that there needs to be an increase in culture in the Efficiecity and assigns a "Culturebeing" 2B2B, an older female, to oversee the implementation of this in sector 80 - she is assigned lodgings to the habiviron by 80H who is amused at the prospect of the Jo-Y residents having to cope with her. She sssigns culture packs to all the other characters (including 80H who has to learn to knit) and is particularly interested in Andy's capabilities as an acting android - until he starts to maltfunction. She considers sending him to be clunked but due to his talents when functional, she gives him a reprieve dependent on him successfully auditioning for a concert, at which the Galctic Coordinator will be guest of honour. Andy passes the audition but malfunctions during the actual performance, leaving the others to improvise around him. Fortunately the Galactic co-ordinator is reportedly highly amused by all this and 2B2B is sent off to deal with other coordinators.
4	4	"Happy Batch Day Dear Luna"	TBA
It is the anniversary of the day Luna was batched. Andy points out that this makes it Luna's birthday and he proposes a birthday party for her. Meanwhile Mother has decided that Brat is not physically fit and has reported him to 80H who assigns him to the pedispherical (football) team. 80H also discovers that it is Brat who has booby trapped his communications microphone to squirt orange squash when activated. While 80H makes Brat repair the damage and train for an upcoming big match, Andy unsuccessfully tries to get his attention regarding financing a birthday outfit for Luna. Brat manages to fake an illness to avoid playing the game (leaving Gramps to play in his place) and sabotages the opposition's transmat so that it too squirts orange squash and they are unable to transmat. The team return triumphs (they have in fact lost due to an own goal by Gramps but the result would have been far worse if not for Brat's efforts) and 80H is happy to join in Luna's party.
5	5	"Environmental Ambience Stable, Wish You Were Here"	TBA
Luna is feeling bored, and Andy proposes going on "vacatocks" (holiday). To do this the group need to get travel permits from 80H, but he is only too happy to provide them, since the Assistant Galactic Coordinator is visiting the sector for a random inspection and he is concerned he would find their habiviron "inefficient". They arrange their plans, but 80H learns that the Coordinator will be visiting earlier than expected, and therefore gives the group permits for the earlier time, leaving their bookings unusable and no time to make earlier ones. Gramps suggests that they could go camping instead, and Brat produces a model VW Beetle which can be converted into a full-size car for them to drive in. Unfortunately, they then find that Jazzmine has no travel permit, and 80H cannot get her one, since technically she is not permitted to be in the habiviron at all. 40D agrees to substitute one of hers, and the group prepares to leave, only to find that car does not work; Brat had no idea that cars needed petrol, which is no longer available. As a last resort, the group decide to camp inside the Habiviron. The Assistant Coordinator arrives in the habiviron as part of his random inspection, and 80H nearly passes out when he sees what's going on, but in fact he's happy to join in.
6	6	"When Did You Last See Your Pater Batch Mix Doner"	TBA
Luna has been reading about family life in the old days and is wistful about not having an actual family. Andy tries to remedy this by purchasing a large quantity of goods from an illegal antiques dealer to personalise the habiviron. Meanwhile Brat has squirted glue on 80H's chair causing him a variety of humiliations. Already angry, he is further enraged by all the illegal clunk in the habiviron and set over the edge when the residents laugh at him. He gives Brat corporal punishment, plans to clunk Andy and banish Jazzmine. Shocked by this Luna runs away, taking Jazzmine with her, to find her biological parents. She works her way through a series of adminoids with little success. Meanwhile 80H, still not satisfied, has discovered that Gramps is now at an age where, without adult sponsorship, he can be exiled to a "Senior Pater Colony" (old peoples' home) otherwise known as a "crotchety camp" and intends to do so. 80H, under pressure from 40D finally relents and goes into the city to persuade Luna - whom for the first time he calls by her name - to come home. The deadline for Gramps to be taken to the camp approaches when a much calmer 80H returns with Luna who, it turns out, is just about old enough to sponsor Gramps and prevent his exile to the Crotchety camp. She reveals that her biological parents don't know her or each other, but her true family are the habiviron Jo-Y residents. Afterwards, 80H institutes a new system of custard pies in the face as punishment for minor offences - he pies Brat, Gramps and the video screen images of a caller to his office before a mischievous 40D pies him and giggles ...

=== Series 2 ===
No. overall	No. in season	Title	Original release date
7	1	"You Can't Judge a Videotalker by its Blurb"	TBA
Luna has gone away and a new female diminibeing is assigned to habiviron Jo-Y. Despite initial misgivings, the others accept her and she adopts her predecessor's name Luna, the better to fit in.
8	2	"Go Forth and Quadruplicate"	TBA
Jazzmine is feeling under the weather. Possibly a change of scene will do her some good?
9	3	"The Happiest Earth Revolves of Your Span"	TBA
Luna has found a boyfriend, an alien, but 80H resues to allow him in the habiviron. Andy, Gramps and the others successfully campaign for him to be allowed access but in the meantime, Luna has moved on to an even more extreme alien boyfriend.
10	4	"It Isn't How You Vict or Slunk But How You Co-participate"	TBA
Luna is scheduled to compete in a sporting contest, similar to volleyball but involving laser beams instead of a ball, against the fearsome Grunzella. Andy organises a cheerleading section for Luna. Luna wins the contest and Grunzella is left dejected at how nobody likes her- Luna suggests to her that she might be more popular is she in turn were more friendly to people.
11	5	"A Bureaubreau In The Hand Is Worth A Pension"	TBA
Andy is concerned over financial matters, while 80H's office is in turmoil.
12	6	"You're Only As Multi-Tocked As You Perceive"	TBA
When Andy begins to malfunction, Brat wants to have him replaced with the latest model. However, Luna and the others take him to the garage to see if the mechanic can help, as he is due for his Molecular and Orthomechanical Test.

== Converted songs ==
Many of the episodes of Luna feature "techno talk" versions of classic or music hall songs. These include:

- I belong to 3540 (I Belong to Glasgow) and Maybe it's because I'm a 3540er (Maybe it's because I'm a Londoner), sung by the Clunkman in 1.2.
- I do like to be beside the Saline (I Do Like To be Beside the Seaside) and We're Porting along on a Tidal Displacement (We're Riding Along on the Crest of a Wave), sung by the whole group in 1.5.
