= List of people from Beckenham =

People connected to Beckenham, England

Beckenham is a town in the London Borough of Bromley, England. The following is a list of those people who were either born or live in Beckenham, or else had important connections to make to the town.

== A ==
- Raymond Adamson (1920–2002), television actor
- Rory Allen (born 1977), football player
- Julie Andrews (born 1935), actress, singer, author
- Claude Ashton (1901–1942), football player, cricketer, hockey player
- Gerald Aste (1900–1961), cricketer

== B ==
- A.L. Barker (1918–2002), novelist, short story writer
- Django Bates (born 1960), composer; multi-instrumentalist, band leader
- Hugh Bean (1929–2003), violinist
- Floella Benjamin (born 1949), actress, singer and TV presenter
- John Bennett (1928–2005), actor
- Enid Blyton (1897–1968), children’s writer
- Frank Bourne (1855–1945), Anglo-Zulu War veteran
- David Bowie (1947–2016), musician, actor, producer, arranger
- Zowie Bowie (born 1971), film director (and son of David Bowie)
- Betty Box (1915–1999), film producer and screenwriter
- Sydney Box (1907–1983), film producer and screenwriter
- Tony Bradman (born 1954), children’s author
- Peircy Brett (1709–1781), admiral in Royal Navy; politician
- Bob Broadbent (1924–1993), cricketer
- Ali Brown (born 1970), cricketer
- Godfrey Bryan (1902–1991), cricketer
- Jack Bryan (1896–1985), cricketer
- Ronnie Bryan (1898–1970), cricketer
- Stuart Bunce (born 1971), actor
- Arthur Gardiner Butler (1844–1925), entomologist

== C ==
- Pat Coombs (1926–2002), actress
- James Cossins (1933–1997), actor

== D ==
- Richard Daintree (1831–1878), geologist and photographer
- T. Pelham Dale (1821–1892), Anglo-Catholic ritualist clergyman
- Samuel Daukes (1811–1880), architect
- Maurice Denham (1909–2002), actor

== E ==
- George Eden, 1st Earl of Auckland (1784–1849), politician and colonial administrator
- William Eden, 1st Baron Auckland (1745–1814), politician and diplomat
- Philip Ensor (1920–1941), British flying ace of the Second World War
- Carl Erhardt (1897–1988), ice hockey player

== F ==
- Mary Farmer (1940–2021), textile artist and designer
- Liam Fontaine (born 1986), football player
- Philip Fotheringham-Parker (1907–1981), racing driver
- Peter Frampton (born 1950), singer-songwriter and musician

== H ==
- Haircut 100, New wave/Jazz-funk band formed in 1980 by Nick Heyward
- John Pennington Harman (1914–1944), recipient of the Victoria Cross
- David Haye, boxer
- Alec Hearne (1863–1952), cricketer
- Nick Heyward (born 1961), singer, guitarist
- Leigh Hinds (born 1978), football player
- C. Walter Hodges (1909–2004), illustrator and author
- Elizabeth Hope (1842–1922), evangelist; temperance movement
- Charles Howard (1904–1982), cricketer

== J ==
- Steve Jansen (born 1959), musician
- Graham Johnson (born 1946), cricketer

== K ==
- Georgina Kennedy (born 1997), professional squash player (Commonwealth Games champion 2022)
- Rob Key (born 1979), cricketer
- Daniel King (born 1963), chess player; writer and journalist
- John Kingman (born 1939), mathematician

== L ==
- Kate Lawler (born 1980), TV presenter, disc jockey, winner of Big Brother UK
- Alfred Layman (1858–1940), cricketer
- Mark Lovell (born 1983), football player

== M ==
- Andrew Manze (born 1965), baroque violinist and conductor
- Piers Merchant (1951–2009), politician
- Bob Monkhouse (1928–2003), entertainer
- Ivor Moreton (1908–1984), singer and pianist, lived in Beckenham during World War II

== O ==
- John Orchard (1928–1995), film actor (M*A*S*H)
- Jonathan Orders (born 1957), cricketer

== P ==
- Arthur Beresford Pite (1861–1934), architect
- Mary Potter (1900–1981), painter
- James Pigott Pritchett (1789–1868), architect
- Frank Pullen (1915–1992), businessman and builder

== R ==
- Cornthwaite Rason (1858–1927), Premier of Western Australia
- Dorothy Richardson (1873–1957), novelist
- Christopher Ricks (born 1933), literary critic
- Ken Ritchie (born 1946), psephologist
- Ritchie (vocalist) (born 1952), British-Brazilian musician

== S ==
- Stanley Scott (1854–1933), cricketer
- Richard Smith (born 1971), fingerstyle guitarist
- Wende Snijders (born 1978), Dutch singer
- Frank Spenlove-Spenlove (1868–1933), painter; founder of "Yellow Door School of Art" in Beckenham
- David Sylvian (born 1958), singer, musician, composer

== T ==
- Richard Thorpe (born 1984), rugby union player

== V ==
- Paul Volley (born 1975), rugby union player

== W ==
- Wavell Wakefield, 1st Baron Wakefield of Kendal (1898–1983), rugby union player and politician
- Bill Wyman, bass guitarist, member of the Rolling Stones, lived at 44 Birkbeck Road, Beckenham in the 1960s
