= I Love You Avenue =

Studio album by Nick Heyward
- Released: 1988
- Recorded: Village Recorders (Dagenham), Rooster Studios, Mayfair Studios, PRT Studios
- Genres: Pop; synth-pop
- Length: 49:10
- Label: Reprise
- Producer: Graham Sacher

Nick Heyward chronology
Postcards From Home (1986)	I Love You Avenue (1988)	From Monday to Sunday (1993)

Singles from I Love You Avenue
- 1. "You’re My World" Released: 22 August 1988; 2. "Tell Me Why" Released: January 1989

Professional ratings
Review scores
Source	Rating
AllMusic	2/5 stars
Pop Rescue	4/5 stars

I Love You Avenue is the third solo album by English singer-songwriter Nick Heyward. It was released in 1988 through Reprise Records and produced two UK singles, ‘’You’re My World’’ (#67 in the UK Singles Chart) and ‘’Tell Me Why’’.

== Recording and production ==
The album was produced by Heyward's manager, Graham Sacher, and recorded at four studios: Village Recorders in Dagenham, London; Rooster Studios, Mayfair and PRT.

== Track listing ==
All tracks are written by Nick Heyward and Graham Sacher.

No.	Title	Length
1.	"You’re My World"	4:16
2.	"If That's the Way You Feel"	2:59
3.	"Traffic in Fleet Street"	3:44
4.	"Lie With You"	3:31
5.	"My Kind of Wonderful"	4:27
6.	"I Love You Avenue"	5:01
7.	"Hold On (Money Don't Buy Love)"	3:41
8.	"Tell Me Why"	3:45
9.	"Pizza Tears"	4:03
10.	"This is Love"	4:15
11.	"Change of Heart"	4:21
12.	"August in the Morning"	4:19
Total length:		49:10

== Personnel ==
Credits are adapted from the album's liner notes.

- Nick Heyward – vocals, electric guitar, acoustic guitar, keyboards, design
- Peter Beckett – keyboards
- Richard Bull – guitar
- Nick Coler – keyboards
- Les Nemes – bass guitar, drum programming
- Jackie Rawe – backing vocals
- Gary Sanctuary – keyboards
- Paul Spong – trumpet
- Phil Smith – saxophone
- Pete Thoms – trombone
- Andy Whitmore – keyboards

Production

- Graham Sacher – record producer
- Richard Bull – engineer
- Ian Richardson – assistant engineer
- Nick Sykes – assistant engineer
- Arun Chkraverty – mastering
- John Hudson mixing
- Simon Halfon – design, photography
