= Woodland Echoes =

Studio album by Nick Heyward
- Released: 4 August 2017
- Genres: Rock, pop, alternative, indie
- Length: 42:04
- Label: Gladsome Hawk
- Producers: Nick Heyward, Phillip Taylor, Ian Shaw, Oliver Heyward

Nick Heyward chronology
The Mermaid and the Lighthouse Keeper (2006)	Woodland Echoes (2017)

Woodland Echoes is the ninth solo album by English singer-songwriter Nick Heyward. It was released on 4 August 2017 on Gladsome Hawk Records. He has described it as accidentally biographical and influenced by "love, nature, togetherness, ‘70s’ pop, America, open spaces and afternoon tea".

== Singles ==
The first single is a double A-side with the songs 'Baby Blue Sky' and 'Mountaintop' and was released on 30 June 2017. The video for 'Baby Blue Sky' was exclusively premiered by Music-News.com on 18 July 2017.

The second single, 'Perfect Sunday Sun', was premiered by Billboard on 31 October 2017. Heyward describes the song as "my interpretation of indecision, idealism and havering – a kind of trilogy, like Krzysztof Kieślowski's Three Colours film series". "It starts off in Richmond, goes to Bedford Falls in It's A Wonderful Life, to San Francisco to Hitchcock".

'The Stars', described by Mojo magazine as a top 10 single and the best track on the album, was announced as the third single in conjunction with Record Store Day UK on 6 March 2018. It will be available on 10" vinyl with an exclusive b-side, 'Everyone & Everything'.

== Critical reception ==
Professional ratings
Aggregate scores
Source	Rating
Metacritic	83/100
Review scores
Source	Rating
AllMusic	4/5 stars
Classic Pop	4/5 stars
Mojo	4/5 stars
The Observer	3/5 stars
PopMatters	9/10
Record Collector	4/5 stars
Sunday Express	5/5 stars
Uncut	8/10

Rated at 82 in Metacritic's Best Albums of 2017, it's described as a "tonic for life" and "an aural injection of Vitamin D." The album's pastoral sound and unmistakable Englishness has garnered comparisons to Lennon and McCartney, Paul Weller and Teenage Fanclub.

== Track listing ==
All tracks are written by Nick Heyward.

No.	Title	Producer(s)	Length
1.	"Love Is the Key by the Sea"	Nick Heyward, Phillip Taylor, Oliver Heyward	4:22
2.	"Mountaintop"	Ian Shaw, N Heyward	3:28
3.	"The Stars"	N Heyward, Taylor, O Heyward	3:45
4.	"Beautiful Morning"	Taylor, N Heyward	4:28
5.	"Who?"	Taylor, N Heyward	3:10
6.	"Forest of Love"	Taylor, N Heyward	3:15
7.	"Baby Blue Sky"	Shaw, N Heyward	3:11
8.	"I Can See Her"	Shaw, N Heyward	3:09
9.	"Perfect Sunday Sun"	Shaw, N Heyward	3:17
10.	"New Beginning"	O Heyward	3:30
11.	"I Got a Lot"	Shaw, N Heyward, O Heyward	3:31
12.	"For Always"	Shaw, N Heyward	2:57
Total length:			42:04

== Personnel ==
- Nick Heyward – lead vocals, acoustic guitar, electric guitar, bass guitar, drums, keyboards, glockenspiel, wood saw, whisk
- Matt Backer – electric guitar, slide guitar
- Denis Blackham – mastering
- Anthony Clark – organ, strings, keyboards, Hammond organ, Rhodes piano
- Blair Cunningham – drums
- Claire Finley – backing vocals
- Oliver Heyward – producer, bass
- Ericson Holt – Hammond organ, piano
- Joey Marchiano – drums
- Ryan Robinson – electric guitar, slide guitar
- Ian Shaw – producer, drum/percussion programming (on "Mountaintop")
- Chris Sheldon – mixing
- Simon Taylor – saxophone (on "Who?")
- Phillip Taylor – producer, double bass, bass guitar, keyboards, drum programming
- Alisa Walker – fiddle (on "Mountaintop")

== Charts ==
Chart (2017)	Peak position
Scottish Albums (Official Charts)	73
UK Albums (Official Charts)	89
UK Independent Albums (Official Charts)	4
UK Vinyl Albums (OCC)	32
