= Nick Powell (bassist) =

English musician

- Also known as: Nick Juno; Juno; Uncle Big Face
- Born: Nicholas Clarke Powell; Singapore
- Genres: Indie rock; Progressive House
- Occupations: Singer, bass guitarist, songwriter
- Labels: Warm Fuzz, East West
- Website: sebastopol.rocks

Nick Powell is an English musician and songwriter. He is the singer and bassist of the rock band Sebastopol. Prior to Sebastopol he was the bassist in the now defunct band Kinky Machine. In addition, he is a photographer responsible for the two Twelfth Night album covers for Collector's Item and Live and Let Live.

== Select discography ==
- Kinky Machine: Bent (1994)
- Kinky Machine: London Crawling (1995)
- Faultline: Closer Colder (1999)
- Sebastopol: Hello All Stations, This is Zero (2012)
