= Ian Shaw =

Ian Shaw may refer to:

- Ian Shaw (Egyptologist) (born 1961), lecturer at the University of Liverpool
- Ian Shaw (singer) (born 1962), Welsh jazz singer and former stand-up comedian
- Ian Shaw (sport shooter) (born 1969), British sport shooter
- Ian Shaw (actor) (born 1969), British actor
- Ian Shaw (producer), English record producer
- Ian Shaw (rugby union), Scottish rugby player
- Ian Shaw (Home and Away), fictional character
