= Whistle Down the Wind (song) =

Single by Nick Heyward

from the album North of a Miracle
- Released: 11 March 1983
- Genre: New wave
- Length: 3:39
- Label: Arista
- Songwriter(s): Nick Heyward
- Producer(s): Geoff Emerick, Nick Heyward

Nick Heyward singles chronology
"Whistle Down the Wind" (1983)	"Take That Situation" (1983)

"Whistle Down the Wind" is the debut solo single by English musician Nick Heyward, from his debut solo album North of a Miracle. Released in March 1983, it was his first release after leaving Haircut One Hundred. The song peaked at No. 13 on the UK Singles Chart, as well as reaching No. 20 on the U.S. Billboard Adult Contemporary chart in February 1984.
