= Love Plus One =

1982 single by Haircut One Hundred

Single by Haircut One Hundred

from the album Pelican West
- B-side: "Marine Boy"
- Released: January 1982
- Recorded: 1981
- Genre: New wave; college rock; new pop
- Label: Arista
- Songwriter: Nick Heyward
- Producer: Bob Sargeant

Haircut One Hundred singles chronology
"Favourite Shirts (Boy Meets Girl)" (1981)	"Love Plus One" (1982)	"Fantastic Day" (1982)

"Love Plus One" is a 1982 single by the British new wave band Haircut One Hundred from their debut album Pelican West. It was the band's biggest hit in their native UK, where it reached No. 3 and was certified gold by the BPI for sales in excess of 400,000 copies.

== Release ==
The single was released in the UK in January 1982, entering the UK Singles Chart at No. 36 and quickly moving up to No. 12 two weeks later, eventually reaching No. 3. It stayed in the top 40 for a total of 11 weeks, ending up being the 14th best-selling single in the UK that year.

The single was the band's only hit in the United States, where it peaked at No. 37 on the Billboard Hot 100 chart. In 2022, Rolling Stone ranked it 79 on their list "100 Best Songs of 1982". The song ranked at No. 90 on VH1's 100 Greatest One Hit Wonders of the 1980s.

== Critical reception ==
"Love Plus One" was Single of the Week in Smash Hits, where Ian Birch described the song as "a nifty mover with plenty of interesting details" and predicted it would become an even bigger hit than "Favourite Shirts (Boy Meets Girl)".

== Track listing ==
UK release

- 7" single (Arista CLIP2)
1. "Love Plus One" – 3:35
2. "Marine Boy" – 3:33

Timings are not stated on the UK release although are specified on certain overseas releases.

- 12" single (Arista CLIP121)
1. "Love Plus One" – 5:39
2. "Marine Boy" – 4:56

US release

- 7" single (Arista AS 0672)
1. "Love Plus One" – 3:35
2. "Favourite Shirts (Boy Meets Girl)" – 3:04

== Charts ==
=== Weekly charts ===
Chart (1982)	Peak position
UK Singles Chart	3
Australia (Kent Music Report)	10
U.S. Billboard Hot 100	37
U.S. Billboard Hot Dance Club Play	8
U.S. Billboard Hot Mainstream Rock Tracks	18
Canada RPM Top 100	10

=== Year-end charts ===
Year-end chart performance for "Love Plus One"
Chart (1982)	Position
Australia (Kent Music Report)	98
