= Favourite Shirts (Boy Meets Girl) =

Single by Haircut One Hundred

from the album Pelican West
- B-side: "Boat Party"
- Released: October 1981
- Genre: New wave; new pop
- Length: 3:02
- Label: Arista
- Songwriter: Nick Heyward
- Producer: Bob Sargeant

Haircut One Hundred singles chronology
"Favourite Shirts (Boy Meets Girl)" (1981)	"Love Plus One" (1982)

"Favourite Shirts (Boy Meets Girl)" is the debut single by the British new wave band Haircut One Hundred, released in October 1981 by Arista Records. It is from their debut studio album Pelican West, released in 1982. The song reached No. 4 on the UK Singles Chart in November 1981 and was certified silver by the BPI for sales in excess of 200,000 copies.

== Composition ==
The song was written by group vocalist Nick Heyward. The writing credits of the B-side, "Boat Party", are attributed to Haircut One Hundred, although the song features guitar riff patterns similar to "Favourite Shirts". Both tracks were recorded at the Roundhouse Studios in Chalk Farm, London, soon after the band had signed to Arista. These recordings are the only ones with Pat Hunt, later replaced by Blair Cunningham, on drums.

== Release and critical reception ==
"Favourite Shirts (Boy Meets Girl)" was released in October 1981 on 7" and 12" formats. Writing in the October 1981 issue of Smash Hits, critic Fred Dellar described the single as doing "for jazz-funk what Dexy's once did for R&B". He described it as a "slight" song, although "the musicianship is both impeccable and exciting."

== Track listing ==
- 7" single (Arista CLIP1)
1. "Favourite Shirts (Boy Meets Girl)"
2. "Boat Party"
- 12" single (Arista CLIP121)
1. "Favourite Shirts (Boy Meets Girl)" – 6:25
2. "Boat Party" – 5:10

This original 12" mix is different to the one later released on The Best of Nick Heyward & Haircut One Hundred (1989), Pelican West Plus (1992) and The Greatest Hits of Nick Heyward & Haircut One Hundred (1996), which featured longer 12" mixes.

== Chart performance ==
The single initially entered the UK top 40 at No. 40 at the end of October 1981. It then reached its peak position of No. 4 within three weeks, remaining at the same position for a further week, kept off the top spot by such artists as Queen and David Bowie, Julio Iglesias, the Police and Earth, Wind & Fire. The single spent a total of eight weeks in the top 40 and 14 in the top 100. The group appeared on Top of the Pops for the first time to perform the song on 29 October 1981, when the single had reached No. 40 in the UK chart. They performed the song on the show for the second and final time on 12 November 1981, when it was at the No. 9 position. It reached its peak of No. 4 on 15 November 1981.

=== Charts ===
Chart (1981–82)	Peak position
United Kingdom (OCC)	4
Australia (Kent Music Report)	97
US Billboard Hot Mainstream Rock Tracks	50
US Billboard Bubbling Under the Hot 100	1
US Billboard Disco Top 80	41
