= Nobody's Fool (Haircut One Hundred song) =

Single by Haircut One Hundred

from the album Pelican West Plus
- B-side: "October Is Orange (Day 1 and Day 2)"
- Released: 13 August 1982
- Genre: New wave
- Length: 4:57 (12"); 4:14 (7")
- Label: Arista
- Songwriter: Nick Heyward
- Producer: Bob Sargeant

Haircut One Hundred singles chronology
| "Fantastic Day" (1982) | "Nobody's Fool" (1982) | "Prime Time" (1983) |

"Nobody's Fool" is a song by the British new wave band Haircut One Hundred, released on 13 August 1982 as the band's fourth single. It reached No. 9 on the UK Singles Chart. It is the first single of the band to not appear on any U.S. Billboard chart. The song did not initially appear on any album, but was later included as a bonus track on the 1992 reissue of Pelican West.

It was the band's final UK top 40 hit and the last that singer-songwriter Nick Heyward recorded with the band before he left in late 1982.

The music video features an appearance from Patsy Kensit.
