= Tangled (Nick Heyward album) =

Studio album by Nick Heyward
- Released: 9 October 1995
- Recorded: Summer 1994
- Venues: Battle, East Sussex and Fulham, London
- Studios: Parkgate (Battle) Marcus and Shawsound (Fulham)
- Genres: Rock, Pop, alternative, indie
- Length: 43:50
- Label: Epic
- Producer: Nick Heyward

Nick Heyward chronology
From Monday to Sunday (1993)	Tangled (1995)	The Apple Bed (1998)

Singles from Tangled
- 1. "The World"; 2. "Rollerblade"

Tangled is the fifth solo album by English singer-songwriter Nick Heyward. It was released in 1995 through Epic Records and produced two singles, "The World" (#47 in the UK Singles Chart) and "Rollerblade" (#37 in the UK Singles Chart).

== Track listing ==
All tracks are written by Nick Heyward.

No.	Title	Length
1.	"Kill Another Day"	3:07
2.	"Blinded"	3:00
3.	"Backdated"	3:43
4.	"She Says She Knows"	2:32
5.	"The World"	3:43
6.	"Carry On Loving"	3:41
7.	"I Love the Things You Know I Don't Know"	3:54
8.	"Can't Explain"	2:48
9.	"Believe in Me"	3:46
10.	"Rollerblade"	2:50
11.	"The Breadwinner"	3:16
12.	"London"	2:53
13.	"She's Another Girl"	3:11
14.	"1961"	1:23
Total length:		43:50

== Personnel ==
Credits are adapted from the album's liner notes.

- Nick Heyward – Arranger, composer, vocals, acoustic guitar, harmonica, keyboards, piano, design
- Andy Bell – Bass guitar
- Ben Blakeman – Guitar
- David Bucknall – Cello
- Anthony Clark – Hammond organ, backing vocals
- Keith Fairburn – Percussion, tambourine
- Amelia Fletcher – Vocals
- Jim Kimberley – Drums
- Geoffrey Richardson – Clarinet, ukulele, viola, violin
- Tony Rivers – Backing vocals
- Donald Ross Skinner – Guitar, electric guitar
- Graham Ward – Drums

Production

- Nick Heyward – Record producer
- Julian Gordon-Hastings – Engineer, mixing
- Ian Shaw – Engineer, mixing
- Jerry Kitchenman – mixing
- John Davis – Mastering
- Ben Wiseman – Mastering
- Ryan Art – Design
