= The Apple Bed =

Studio album by Nick Heyward
- Released: 11 August 1997
- Genres: Rock, pop, alternative, indie
- Length: 53:57
- Label: Creation
- Producer: Nick Heyward

Nick Heyward chronology
Tangled (1995)	The Apple Bed (1997)	Open Sesame Seed (2001)

Singles from The Apple Bed
- 1. "Today" Released: 26 May 1997; 2. "The Man You Used to Be" Released: 23 June 1997; 3. "Stars in Her Eyes" Released: 23 February 1998

Professional ratings
Review scores
Source	Rating
AllMusic	4/5 stars
NME	3.5/5 stars
Uncut	3/5 stars

The Apple Bed is the sixth solo album by English singer-songwriter Nick Heyward. It was released in 1997 through Creation Records and produced three singles, "Today", "The Man You Used to Be" and "Stars in Her Eyes." The U.S. version of the CD release contained three bonus tracks (13–15) not listed on the back cover: "3 Colors," "The Brightest Pearl," and "A Beautiful Place."

== Track listing ==
All tracks are written by Nick Heyward.

No.	Title	Length
1.	"Stars in Her Eyes"	3:28
2.	"In Every Place"	3:37
3.	"My Heavy Head"	3:38
4.	"The Chelsea Sky"	3:14
5.	"Just Like Sorrow"	3:22
6.	"Closer"	2:30
7.	"The Goodbye Man"	3:47
8.	"Reach Out for the Sun"	2:57
9.	"Today"	3:21
10.	"I Don't Really Know You"	3:44
11.	"Dear Miss Finland"	3:07
12.	"The Man You Used to Be"	6:50
Total length:		53:57

== Personnel ==
Credits are adapted from the album's liner notes.

- Nick Heyward – Composer, vocals, acoustic guitar, bass guitar
- Anthony Clark – Organ, piano
- Zu Edmonds – Bağlama
- Noel Joyce – Percussion
- Jim Kimberley – Drums
- Michael Newman – Vocal and string arrangements
- Peter Poole – Violin
- Godfrey Salmon – Violin
- Phil Smith – Saxophone
- Phil Taylor – Mellotron
- John Thirkle – Trumpet
- Naomi Zoob – Cello

Production

- Nick Heyward – Record producer
- Ian Shaw – Engineer, mixing, programming
- Chris Sheldon – Mixing
- Denis Blackham – Mastering
