= An Edible History of Humanity =

Book by Tom Standage

- Author: Tom Standage
- Publication date: May 19, 2009
- ISBN: 9780802715883

An Edible History of Humanity is a book written by Tom Standage that encompasses the history of the world from prehistory to modern day times through the tracing of foods and agricultural techniques used by man.

== Overview ==
Standage's book is divided into 6 major sections starting in prehistoric times and advancing up to present day. The six sections are:

1: Edible Foundations of Civilization (Neolithic Revolution transforms hunter-gatherers to agriculturalists.)
2: Food And Social Structure (Food as wealth: sedentary societies that store food create inequalities in wealth and power.)
3: Global Highways of Food (Luxury goods such as spices motivate a quest for wealth via exploration and colonization)
4: Food, Energy, And Industrialization (New World crops and fossil fuels expand agricultural productivity and non-farm occupations leading to Industrial Revolution, but monoculture leads to famine.)
5: Food As A Weapon (Military and political leaders benefit from power over food supply to mobilize armies and to crush dissent.)
6: Food, Population, And Development (The Green Revolution of the 20th century solves some problems but then creates new ones.)

The first section introduces hunting and gathering to the reader, but quickly moves on to agriculture and farming techniques, which enabled a great expansion of population. Standage defends his thesis that farming is a man-made, unnatural system. He does so by discussing the history of maize, an altered, man-made crop. Maize is a major topic in this book as it has become a major staple throughout the world today. Standage also mentions wheat and rice, which were also important cereal grains, often involved in certain religious beliefs of people.

Moving into the second section, Standage claims that sedentary (farming) communities with the ability to store food gave rise to economic and political inequality, and hence to government, social structure, laws, culture, and almost every aspect of life that humans possess today.

In the third section, Standage describes the European desire for spices that could only be purchase by way of Arabia from Asia. Because of the high (and rising) cost of spices, European governments invested in exploration, such as the voyages of Columbus and Magellan.

The theories of Thomas Malthus (that the world's growing population could not be supported by the agriculturally based food supply) are a recurring theme throughout this book.

In section four, Standage shows how two particular innovations of the 18th century (New World crops and replacement of wood with coal for fuel) increased agricultural productivity and made industrialization possible. This section also showcases a darker side of innovation as potato monoculture led to the Great Famine in Ireland beginning in 1845.

Control of the food supply has been, as Standage shows, an important source of power for military and political leaders. In Section Five (Food as a Weapon), Standage talks about the strategies, including developing food preservation techniques, that Napoleon used to feed his troops. Provisioning armies is only one side of this use of power, however. Standage also describes the deaths from hunger of people whose leaders chose to deprive them of food.

In the final section of the book, Standage discusses the Green Revolution, a breakthrough in farming technologies and techniques that occurred in the 1940s to roughly the 1970 which greatly increased crop yields.

Standage told an NPR interviewer that he thinks of food, not as the central motivating force of human history, but as "an invisible fork" that prods humankind. "After all," Standage says, "everything that every person has ever done, throughout history, has literally been fueled by food."

== Reception ==
An Edible History of Humanity generally received both positive and mixed reviews.

Tom Jaine of The Guardian says that Tom "makes a brilliant stab at bringing sense to the table."

Howard Schneider, writing in The Humanist, regrets that the book does not treat more food topics in depth but calls it overall "engrossing, thoughtful, and thought-provoking."

Other critique has been made over the author's position on the agricultural revolution.
