= Pelican West =

Studio album by Haircut One Hundred
- Released: 26 February 1982
- Recorded: 1981–1982
- Studio: Roundhouse (London)
- Genres: New wave; sophisti-pop
- Length: 45:36
- Label: Arista
- Producer: Bob Sargeant

Haircut One Hundred chronology
Pelican West (1982)	Paint and Paint (1984)

Singles from Pelican West
- 1. "Favourite Shirts (Boy Meets Girl)" Released: October 1981; 2. "Love Plus One" Released: January 1982; 3. "Fantastic Day" Released: April 1982

Pelican West is the debut studio album by the British new wave band Haircut One Hundred, released on 26 February 1982 by Arista Records. It peaked at No. 2 on the UK Albums Chart and No. 31 on the Billboard 200, and was certified platinum by the British Phonographic Industry (BPI).

The album featured three hit singles: "Love Plus One", "Favourite Shirts (Boy Meets Girl)" and "Fantastic Day". It was reissued on CD in 1992, retitled as Pelican West Plus and including five bonus tracks.

Frontman Nick Heyward later said, "It was a team effort, and everyone had their roles. My job was like the Paul McCartney one in the Beatles' Get Back film. The rest of the guys looked to me for direction, and I had to push them to turn these glorified jam sessions into three-minute pop songs."

== Critical reception ==
Professional ratings
Review scores
Source	Rating
AllMusic	4.5/5 stars
Classic Pop	5/5 stars
Q	4/5 stars
Record Collector	4/5 stars
Record Mirror	5/5 stars
Rolling Stone	2/5 stars
Smash Hits	8 1/2/10
Sounds	5/5 stars
Uncut	8/10
The Village Voice	C+

Pelican West was well received by contemporary critics. In the NME, Danny Baker commented that the album "contains some of the most summery, stylish and extravagantly repeatable music since Countdown to Ecstasy", concluding that "Haircut One Hundred have made the lightweight – there's no other kind – masterpiece of the decade." Smash Hits reviewer David Hepworth was impressed by "the winning vocals, the sturdy, flexible rhythm section, creamy saxophone, the poignant, exhilarating and thoroughly British songs", adding, "Haircuts know just how far they can spin out their compositions and never resort to empty mannerisms." Dave McCullough of Sounds highlighted the songs' unexpectedly "terse musicality", while Mike Nicholls of Record Mirror said that the group had "blossomed" from "a slight trio tentatively coming to terms with the groove ... into a fully-fledged dance brigade whose abundance of ideas is matched only by their finesse." Although finding the album underdeveloped, Melody Maker's Ian Pye stated that "as it is this could still be the party album of 1982".

In a less enthusiastic review for Rolling Stone, J. D. Considine felt that Haircut One Hundred's "stylized and largely ineffectual funk" undermined Nick Heyward's talents as a songwriter, while in The Village Voice, Robert Christgau dismissively compared the band to the Doobie Brothers. Following the 1992 release of the reissue Pelican West Plus, Andrew Perry mocked the original album in Select as "teeth-grindingly twee" and suggested that it had been championed by "critics combating the onset of middle age by celebrating the infantile".

Among later retrospective appraisals, Record Collector's Mark Elliott dubbed Pelican West "a true 80s classic that captures that 1982 zeitgeist with every breezy sax flourish and fey lyrical twist." In Classic Pop, Paul Lester said that it "was a fabulous piece of work then and remains so now, a gorgeous marriage of pop melody and funk rhythm, shot through with the peculiar worldview of Nick Heyward". Tim Sendra of AllMusic wrote that Haircut One Hundred excelled at "escapist, but never mindless fun, and on Pelican West they bury their arrows dead center in the middle of that target." It was included in the book 1001 Albums You Must Hear Before You Die (2006), with critic David Nichols noting in an accompanying essay that "Heyward's non-ironic love for pop shows through in every track."

== Track listing ==
=== Original album ===
All tracks are written by Nick Heyward, except "Love's Got Me in Triangles" by Nick Heyward and Les Nemes. In the U.S., tracks one and two were in reverse sequence.

No.	Title	Length
1.	"Favourite Shirts (Boy Meets Girl)"	3:06
2.	"Love Plus One"	3:34
3.	"Lemon Firebrigade"	3:56
4.	"Marine Boy"	3:33
5.	"Milk Film"	2:55
6.	"Kingsize (You're My Little Steam Whistle)"	4:25
7.	"Fantastic Day"	3:14
8.	"Baked Bean"	4:03
9.	"Snow Girl"	2:56
10.	"Love's Got Me in Triangles"	3:38
11.	"Surprise Me Again"	3:19
12.	"Calling Captain Autumn"	4:06
Total length:		45:36

=== Pelican West Plus (1992) ===
All tracks are written by Nick Heyward, except "Boat Party", "Ski Club" and "October Is Orange (Day 1 & 2)" by Haircut One Hundred.

Pelican West Plus bonus tracks (1992)
No.	Title	Length
13.	"Boat Party"	3:54
14.	"Ski Club"	4:40
15.	"Nobody's Fool" (12" version)	4:57
16.	"October Is Orange (Day 1 & 2)"	4:20
17.	"Favourite Shirts (Boy Meets Girl)" (12" version)	7:10
Total length:		67:42

=== Double CD reissue (1998, 2016) ===
Disc one
No.	Title	Length
1.	"Favourite Shirts (Boy Meets Girl)"	3:05
2.	"Love Plus One"	3:33
3.	"Lemon Firebrigade"	3:55
4.	"Marine Boy"	3:28
5.	"Milk Film"	2:57
6.	"Kingsize (You're My Little Steam Whistle)"	4:24
7.	"Fantastic Day"	3:13
8.	"Baked Bean"	4:03
9.	"Snow Girl"	2:57
10.	"Love's Got Me in Triangles"	3:37
11.	"Surprise Me Again"	3:17
12.	"Calling Captain Autumn"	4:05
13.	"Boat Party"	3:50
14.	"Ski Club"	3:38
15.	"October Is Orange (Day 1 & 2)"	4:17
16.	"Nobody's Fool" (7" single)	4:13
Total length:		58:32

Disc two
No.	Title	Length
1.	"Favourite Shirts (Boy Meets Girl)" (12" version)	6:28
2.	"Love Plus One" (12" version)	5:40
3.	"Fantastic Day" (12" version)	4:19
4.	"Nobody's Fool" (12" version)	4:58
5.	"Calling Captain Autumn" (special extended version)	4:34
6.	"Boat Party" (12" version)	5:33
7.	"October Is Orange (Day 1 and Day 2)" (12" version)	5:11
8.	"Ski Club of Great Britain"	5:53
9.	"Marine Boy" (12" version)	4:49
10.	"Love's Got Me in Triangles" (special extended version)	5:10
11.	"Favourite Shirts (Boy Meets Girl)" (extended version)	7:10
12.	"Fantastic Day" (live at Hammersmith Odeon)	4:22
13.	"Calling Captain Autumn" (12" version)	6:00
Total length:		70:08

== Personnel ==
Credits are adapted from the album's liner notes.

Haircut One Hundred

- Nick Heyward – vocals, lead guitar, rhythm guitar
- Les Nemes – bass guitar
- Graham Jones – guitar
- Phil Smith – saxophone, brass arrangements
- Marc Fox – congas, percussion
- Blair Cunningham – drums

Additional musicians

- Herschel Holder – trumpet
- Dave Lord – trumpet
- Vince Sullivan – trombone

Production

- Bob Sargeant – production
- Mark Dearnley – engineering
- Dave Kemp – engineering
- David Shortt – art direction
- Gered Mankowitz – photography
- Peter Hill – sleeve art
- Karl Adams – management

== Charts ==
=== Weekly charts ===
Chart (1982)	Peak position
Australian Albums (Kent Music Report)	27
New Zealand Albums (RMNZ)	12
Swedish Albums (Sverigetopplistan)	29
UK Albums (Official Charts)	2
US Billboard 200	31

=== Year-end charts ===
Chart (1982)	Position
New Zealand Albums (RMNZ)	24

Singles

Year	Song	Chart	Position
1981	"Favourite Shirts (Boy Meets Girl)"	UK Singles Chart	4
1982	"Love Plus One"	UK Singles Chart	3
1982	"Fantastic Day"	UK Singles Chart	9
1982	"Love Plus One"	US Billboard Hot 100	37
1981	"Favourite Shirts (Boy Meets Girl)"	US Billboard Disco/Dance	41
1982	"Love Plus One"	US Billboard Disco/Dance	8
1982	"Ski Club of Great Britain"	US Billboard Disco/Dance	21

== Certifications ==
Region	Certification	Certified units/sales
United Kingdom (BPI)	Platinum	300,000^{^}
^{^} Shipments figures based on certification alone.

== Cultural references ==
In the 1983 Central TV science fiction series Luna - first series episode two "The Clunkman Cometh" - the villainous Clunkman accepts a copy of the album as payment for alien pet Jazzmine - he reckons the album will be valuable although he himself dislikes "classical music".
