= Sebastopol (band) =

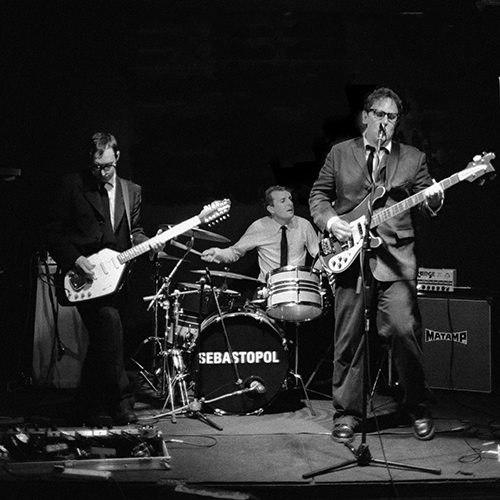
- Sebastopol in 2012

Background information
- Also known as: The Masters of Monochrome
- Origin: London, England
- Genres: Alternative rock; art rock; post-punk; new wave
- Years active: 2010-present
- Label: Warm Fuzz Records
- Members: Nick Powell; Phil Richards; Tom Standage
- Website: Official Website

Sebastopol is an English alternative rock band originating from London. The band consists of Nick Powell (lead vocals and bass guitar), Phil Richards (guitars) and Tom Standage (drums).

== Formation ==
The band formed in 2010 following an incident the previous year when Powell found himself marooned in the North Atlantic while making a television documentary. That experience and what Powell described as "the consequent feeling of helplessness" prompted him to write a collection of songs based around the lyrical themes of being lost, and, specifically, lost at sea. After signing to Warm Fuzz Records, these songs were recorded and became the debut album Hello All Stations, This Is Zero which was produced by Richards and released in 2012.

=== Band Name ===
The band's name "Sebastopol" reportedly comes from the open D guitar tuning used by Richards on all Sebastopol recordings which is traditionally called "sebastopol" after the traditional song "The Siege of Sebastopol" composed in that tuning by the nineteenth-century artist and composer Henry Worrall.

== Hello All Stations, This Is Zero ==
The band's first album Hello All Stations, This Is Zero was released in September 2012. It was well received by reviewers, with one commenting that it would be "cited by singers and songwriters for years to come." Comparisons have been drawn with The Police, with a commentator noting the "space in the sound", the high quality of the songwriting, and the fact that Sebastopol has a power trio configuration.

=== Album Title ===
The album's title Hello All Stations, This Is Zero is taken from a wartime radio call signal from the 1940s signalling the start of a message. However, the number "zero" being written out is apparently poetic licence since, according to the command protocol for imposing radio silence, the actual spoken phrase should be "Hello all stations, this is 0".

=== Inspiration ===
Powell, who is the band's main songwriter, has talked in radio and press interviews about the unusual circumstances and inspiration behind the album. In 2009 he found himself marooned on Sable Island, a small and remote island in the North Atlantic. This lasted a number of weeks during which time Powell's life was in danger. The tracks "Send The Boats" and "Take Me Home" refer to this experience, with the other songs being more loosely linked thematically.

In an interview with Antonia Brickell on BBC Radio Cambridgeshire and others Powell said that the song "All Eyes" was inspired by the book The Passage by Justin Cronin.

== The Masters of Monochrome ==
Sebastopol are occasionally referred to as "The Masters of Monochrome" in radio and press interviews, because all band artwork and photographs are produced in black and white. The nickname was first used in 2012 by journalist Cameron Smith after Sebastopol insisted that video he had just shot of them be converted to black and white as a condition of its being released. This nickname was then repeated on BBC Radio Bristol by hosts Livvy and Chrissie who said they were bemused that all band members turned up for a radio interview dressed in black and white clothes from the 1940s.

== Involvement with Mick Glossop ==
Sebastopol's debut album was produced by the band but mixed by Mick Glossop who has worked with punk and post-punk artists including Public Image Limited and The Wonderstuff. In December 2012 the band said in a BBC interview that they were working on new material with Glossop this time in the role of producer and that it would have more elaborate sound.
