= Fantastic Day =

Single by Haircut One Hundred

from the album Pelican West
- B-side: "Ski Club of Great Britain"
- Released: 1982
- Genre: New wave; new pop
- Length: 3:11
- Label: Arista
- Songwriter: Nick Heyward
- Producer: Bob Sargeant

Haircut One Hundred singles chronology
"Love Plus One" (1982)	"Fantastic Day" (1982)	"Nobody's Fool" (1982)

"Fantastic Day" is a song by the British new wave band Haircut One Hundred, released as the third and final single from their debut studio album Pelican West. The song reached No. 9 on the UK Singles Chart in April 1982.

== Composition and recording ==
The song was originally written by Nick Heyward in 1978: the chorus fell into place quickly, whilst the verses were constructed more deliberately and the lyrics developed over time before it was eventually recorded. According to Heyward, the opening line ("Well there’s a great amount of strain about getting on that train") was inspired by seeing Sheena Easton perform "9 to 5" on the TV programme The Big Time. He has observed that the song has "a sense of light and dark to it", which he attributes to working as a commercial artist "in a room with no natural light" at the time whilst he wanted to make music. According to Les Nemes, the song was arranged in different styles as the band kept changing their sound in their early years: he characterised the original version when the group were known as Moving England as being influenced by Talking Heads and The Jam, which he preferred to the version that became a success. However, he credited it as the song that got the band signed to Arista Records when they played it at a showcase for the label. The song's trumpet fanfare was added to the recording by producer Bob Sargeant at the behest of Heyward, who wanted to include a reference to The Beatles' "She Loves You".

== Release and critical reception ==
"Fantastic Day" was the first single to be issued after the release of the Pelican West studio album. It was succeeded by the release of a non-album track, "Nobody's Fool" in August, which also went top 10 in the UK.

== Track listing ==
- 7" single (Arista CLIP3)
1. "Fantastic Day" — 3:12
2. "Ski Club" — 3:35

Timings are not stated on the UK release although are specified on certain overseas releases. Both tracks are featured on the Pelican West Plus album release.

- 12" single (Arista CLIP123)
1. "Fantastic Day" — 4:16
2. "Ski Club of Great Britain" — 5:54

These versions were released by Arista in the US on a 12" promo disc but they are otherwise unique to this release.

== Charts ==
Chart (1982)	Peak position
UK Singles Chart (OCC)	9
Australia (Kent Music Report)	85

=== "Ski Club of Great Britain" / "Fantastic Day" ===
Chart (1982)	Peak position
US Dance Club Songs (Billboard)	21
