= The Victorian Internet =

1998 book by Tom Standage

The Victorian Internet: The Remarkable Story of the Telegraph and the Nineteenth Century's On-Line Pioneers
- First edition
- Author: Tom Standage
- Language: English
- Genre: Non-fiction
- Publisher: Walker & Company
- Publication date: September 1998
- Publication place: United States
- Media type: Print, ebook
- Pages: 227 pages
- ISBN: 0802713424

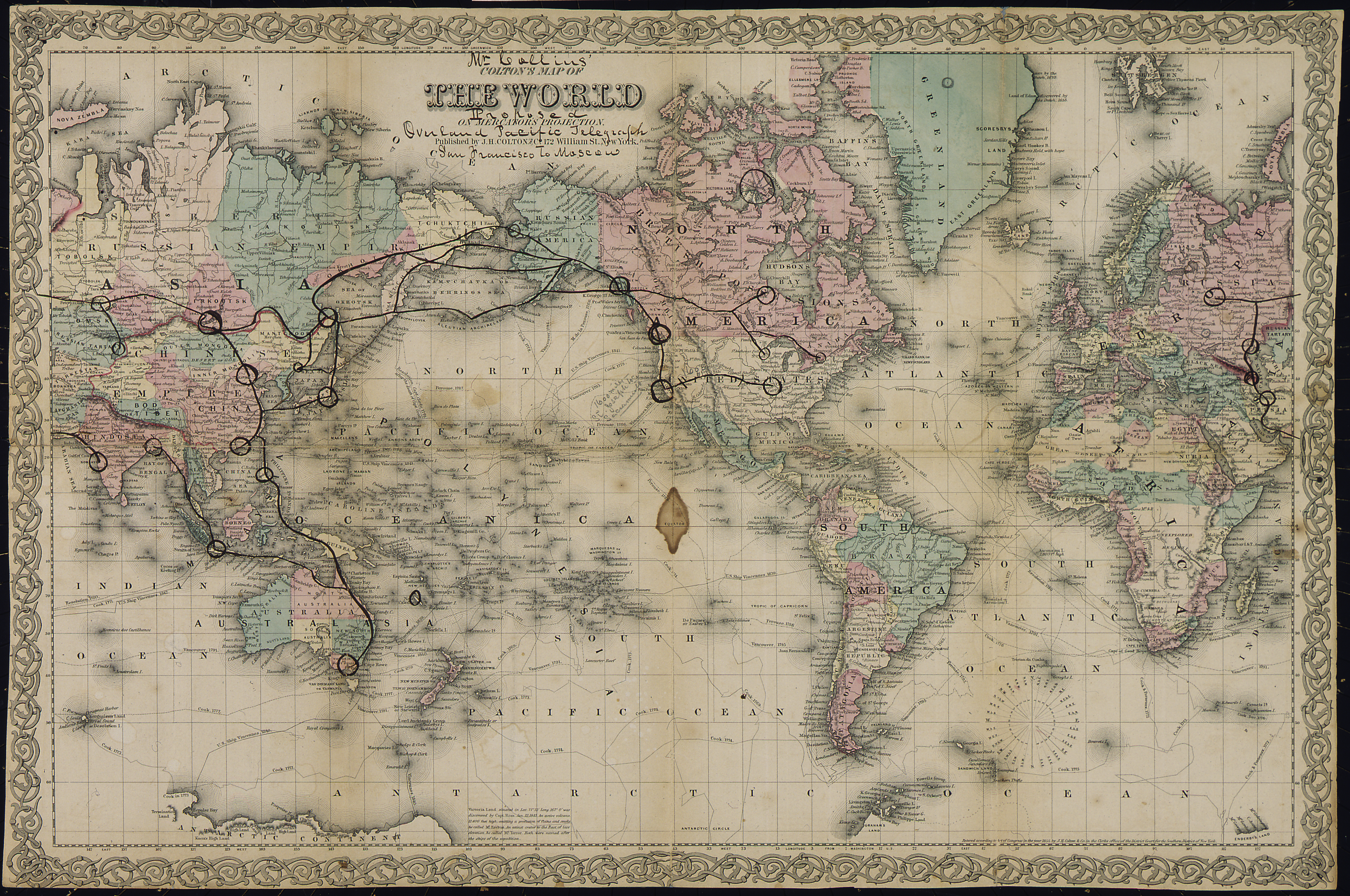
Global network proposal, 1862

The Victorian Internet: The Remarkable Story of the Telegraph and the Nineteenth Century's On-Line Pioneers is a 1998 book by Tom Standage. The book was first published in September 1998 through Walker & Company and discusses the development and uses of the electric telegraph during the second half of the 19th century and some of the similarities the telegraph shared with the Internet of the late 20th century.

The central thesis of the book argues that of these two technologies, it was the telegraph that was the more significant, since the ability to communicate globally at all in real-time was a qualitative shift, while according to Standage the change brought on by the modern Internet was merely a quantitative shift.

== Contents ==
The book describes to general readers how some of the uses of telegraph in commercial, military, and social communication were, in a sense, analogous to modern uses of the internet. A few rather unusual stories are related, about couples who fell in love and even married over the wires, criminals who were caught through the telegraph, and so on.

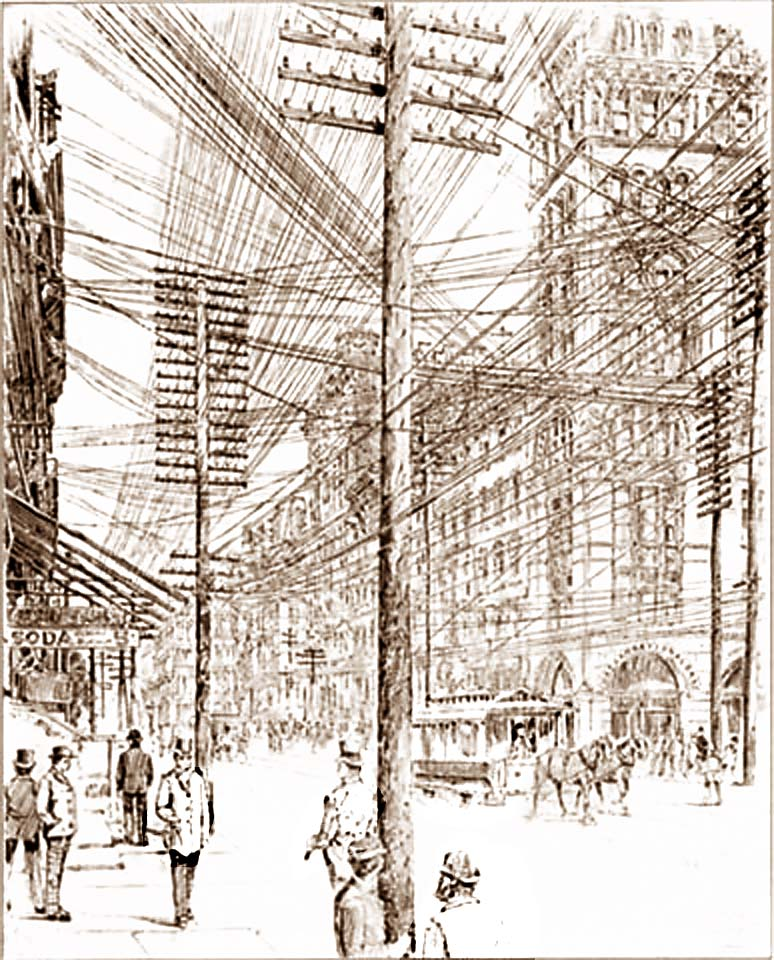
Wired city in 1890

The culture which developed between telegraph operators also had some rather unexpected affinities with the modern Internet. Both cultures made or make use of complex text coding and abbreviated language slang, both required network security experts, and both attracted criminals who used the networks to commit fraud, hack private communications, and send unwanted messages.

== Reception ==
Critical reception of the book was mostly positive. Smithsonian magazine gave a positive review for The Victorian Internet, but stated that it was "not the book for readers who want in-depth accounts of the lives of scientist-inventors like Thomas Edison or Charles Wheatstone, detailed financial histories of companies like Western Union, or technical treatments of subjects like the development of semaphore systems and undersea cables". The Los Angeles Times had some criticisms of the book but gave a mostly positive review.
