= Tom Standage =

British journalist

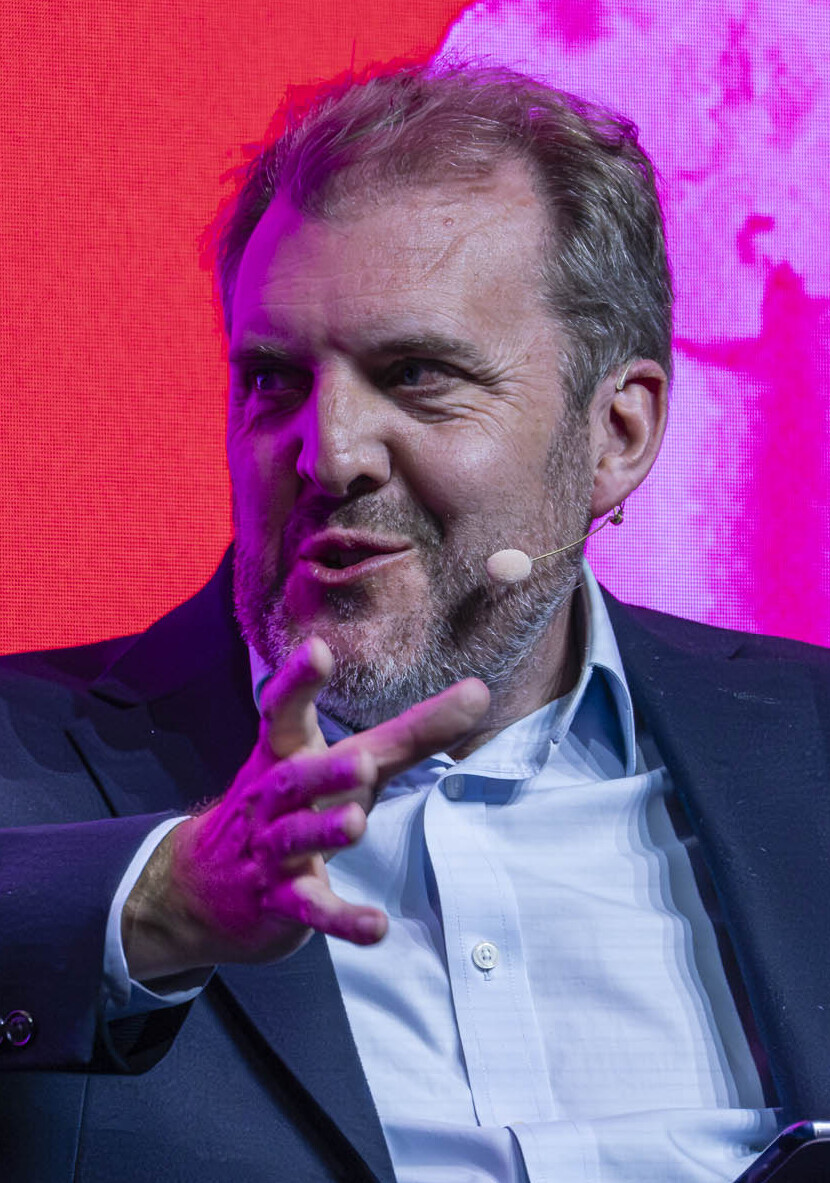
- Standage in 2025
- Born: 1969 (age 56–57); England, United Kingdom
- Occupations: Journalist & author

Tom Standage (born 1969) is a British journalist, author, and editorial executive currently working as the Deputy Editor of The Economist newspaper under editor-in-chief, Zanny Minton Beddoes. As head of the newspaper's digital strategy, Standage is the editor-in-chief of the website of The Economist, its applications and digital platform. He first joined the paper in 1998 as a science correspondent and was successively appointed technology editor, business editor, and finally, digital editor.

Born and raised in England, Standage graduated from Oxford University with a degree in engineering and computing. He began his career in journalism as a science and technology writer for The Guardian and The Daily Telegraph where he was deputy editor of the technology supplement, Connected. Standage is the author of six books including The Victorian Internet (1998), A History of the World in 6 Glasses (2005), and Writing on the Wall (2013).

== Early life and career ==
Standage was born in Greenwich, in South East London, the eldest of his parents' three sons. He attended Oxford University where he studied engineering and computing. He then went on to work as a science and technology writer for The Guardian and The Daily Telegraph.

Standage often bases his writing on the areas of science, technology and business on historical analogies. He has published a collection of articles and surveys from The Economist and six books, including The Victorian Internet, a history of the development of the telegraph and the social ramifications associated with it. Standage argues that the development of the internet mirrors that of the telegraph in that both represented dramatic increases in the speed and transmission of information, and because both were controversial in their time for perceived and actual negative consequences.

Standage's most recent work includes Writing on the Wall (2013).

Standage is the drummer in the band Sebastopol.

== Books ==
- The Turk: The Life and Times of the Famous Eighteenth-Century Chess-Playing Machine
- The Victorian Internet
- The Neptune File
- A History of the World in 6 Glasses
- The Future of Technology
- An Edible History of Humanity
- Writing on the Wall: Social Media—The First 2,000 Years
- A Brief History of Motion: From the Wheel, to the Car, to What Comes Next
