= Warm Fuzz Records =

- Founded: 2006
- Founder: Ian Shaw
- Genre: Alternative Rock
- Country of origin: United Kingdom
- Official website: www.warmfuzz.com

Warm Fuzz Records is a British independent record label focussing on alternative rock founded by producer Ian Shaw.

== Artists released on Warm Fuzz ==
- Kelly's Heels
- Virginia (featuring Alison Wheeler)
- Matt Backer
- The Ashes
- Trouble Dolls
- Sebastopol
- Bill Blue

== See also ==
- List of record labels
