= Nick Heyward =

English singer-songwriter and guitarist

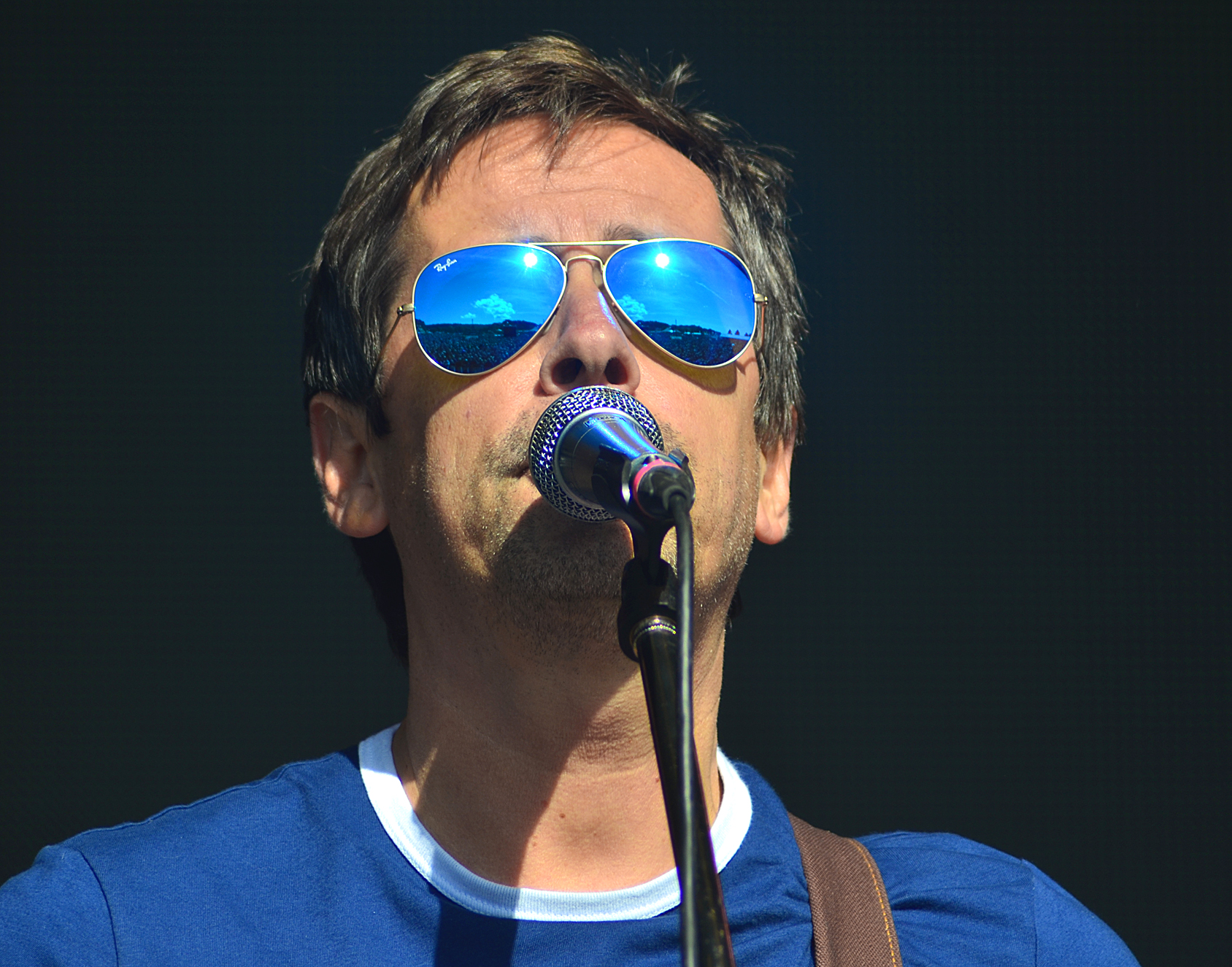
- Heyward at Let's Rock Bristol, June 2015

Background information
- Born: Nicholas Heyward; 20 May 1961 (age 65); Beckenham, Kent, England
- Genres: Pop; rock; new wave; alternative; indie rock; sophisti-pop
- Occupations: Singer; songwriter; guitarist
- Instruments: Vocals; guitar; bass guitar
- Years active: 1980–present
- Labels: Arista (1981–1986); Reprise (1988–1989); Epic (1993–1996); Creation (1997–1998)
- Member of: Haircut One Hundred
- Formerly of: Boogie Box High
- Website: nickheyward.com

Nick Heyward (born 20 May 1961) is an English singer, songwriter and guitarist. He first came to prominence as the lead singer and songwriter of Haircut One Hundred, whose debut album Pelican West produced several UK hit singles in 1982. After leaving the group, Heyward began a solo career, releasing albums including North of a Miracle and From Monday to Sunday and hit singles such as "Whistle Down the Wind" and "Blue Hat for a Blue Day". He reunited with Haircut One Hundred in 2023 and they and released Boxing the Compass in 2026.

== Biography ==
=== Early life ===
Born in Beckenham, Heyward spent his early years in and around south London. He attended Kelsey Park School for Boys in Beckenham where he studied art and photography. He left school at 16 to work as a commercial artist. Around this time Heyward was a punk rock fan, with a particular interest in bands with singer-guitarists, citing XTC's Andy Partridge and Talking Heads' David Byrne as his musical heroes during this period.

=== Haircut One Hundred ===
Heyward and school friends Graham Jones and Les Nemes, the core of Haircut One Hundred, started bands together as far back as 1977. They were first known as Rugby, then the Boat Party, Captain Pennyworth and Moving England, before settling on Haircut One Hundred. The band signed with Arista Records in 1981 and had four UK top 10 singles between 1981 and 1982. Their debut album, Pelican West (1982), written by Heyward, reached No. 2. It was certified platinum by the British Phonographic Industry.

Work on the band's second album commenced in October 1982 but, in January 1983, a statement was issued confirming that Heyward had left the band, and percussionist Marc Fox had taken over on vocals. At the time of the announcement, Heyward told Smash Hits magazine that he had been contemplating going solo for a while and had already recorded some tracks with session musicians. However, many years later, Heyward stated that he had been struggling with stress and depression at the time after a year of constant work and pressure which led to him being, in effect, dismissed by the other members of the band.

Over the years, the band has reformed several times, most recently in May 2023. In 2017 Heyward described a "deep love" for the band and remarked that "the door is always open". In an interview with Lorraine, he said he was "ever hopeful" that the band would one day play a reunion show at the Roundhouse where Pelican West was recorded.

=== Solo career ===
Heyward's solo career began in March 1983 with the single "Whistle Down the Wind", which reached No. 13 on the UK Singles Chart. Two further top 20 hits followed: "Take That Situation" (No. 11) and "Blue Hat for a Blue Day" (No. 14). His debut solo album, North of a Miracle, was released in October 1983 and peaked at No. 10 in the UK. The successive non-album singles, "Love All Day" and "Warning Sign" both went top 40 although a subsequent single "Laura" failed to do so.

Postcards from Home, Heyward's second solo album, was released in 1986, and featured the singles "Over the Weekend" and "Goodbye Yesterday". By 1988, he had moved to Warner Bros. Records and released his third album, I Love You Avenue, which included the single "You're My World".

Heyward's 1993 album, From Monday to Sunday, on Epic Records, featured a more classic rock style, and brought him his first hits of the 1990s. The first single, "Kite", reached No. 44 on the UK Singles Chart and No. 4 on Billboard's Hot Modern Rock Tracks chart.

In 1995, Heyward released his second Epic Records album, Tangled, providing him with the UK top 40 single "Rollerblade".

In 1998, Creation Records released The Apple Bed, Heyward's most recent major label release. It featured three singles, "Today", "The Man You Used to Be" and "Stars in Her Eyes".

Since 1998, Heyward has released two independent albums: Open Sesame Seed (2001), a collaboration with British actor/singer Greg Ellis, and featuring Ellis reading Heyward's poetry to the accompaniment of Heyward's musical backing; and The Mermaid and the Lighthouse Keeper (2006), an album of songs recorded with singer/actress India Dupre.

In November 2013, Heyward announced on his website that he was in the process of recording a new album with his son, Oliver. A preview of the album was made available on the site in October 2015. A PledgeMusic campaign to support the album was announced on Heyward's website, on 4 April 2017 and the album title, Woodland Echoes, was released the following day.

=== Personal life ===
Heyward married Glaswegian Marion Killen in 1987. They had two children before divorcing in 2000.

Heyward divides his time between Henley-on-Thames, South Oxfordshire and Tampa, Florida. In February 2016 he announced his engagement to his girlfriend Sara Johnson and they were married after the covid-19 pandemic.

== Discography ==
=== Albums ===
List of albums, with selected details, chart positions and certifications
| Title | Details | Peak chart positions | | | | Certifications |
| Title | Details | UK | US | SWE | NZ | Certifications |
|---|---|---|---|---|---|---|
| Pelican West (with Haircut One Hundred) | Released: 9 March 1982; Label: Arista (HCC100); Format: LP, CS | 2 | 31 | 29 | 12 | BPI: Platinum |
| North of a Miracle | Released: 21 October 1983; Label: Arista (NORTH1); Format: LP, CS | 10 | 178 | — | — | BPI: Gold |
| Postcards from Home | Released: 1986; Label: Arista (610461); Format: CD, LP, CS | — | — | — | — | |
| I Love You Avenue | Released: 10 October 1988; Label: Reprise (925 758-1); Format: CD, LP, CS | — | — | — | — | |
| From Monday to Sunday | Released: 7 December 1993; Label: Epic (EK 57755); Format: CD, LP | — | — | — | — | |
| Tangled | Released: 9 October 1995; Label: Epic (4811732); Format: CD | 93 | — | — | — | |
| The Apple Bed | Released: 11 August 1998; Label: Creation (CRECD 210); Format: CD | — | — | — | — | |
| Open Sesame Seed | Released: 2001; Label: Private release; Format: CD | — | — | — | — | |
| The Mermaid and the Lighthouse Keeper | Released: 2006; Label: Up the Ante; Format: CD | — | — | — | — | |
| Woodland Echoes | Released: 2017; Label: Gladsome Hawk; Format: CD, LP | 89 | — | — | — | |
| Boxing the Compass (with Haircut One Hundred) | Released: 2026; Label: Map of England Records; Format: CD, LP | — | — | — | — | |
"—" denotes a recording that did not chart or was not released in that territory.

=== Singles ===
List of singles, with selected chart positions and certifications, showing year released and album name
| Title | Year | Peak chart positions | | | | | | | | Certifications | Album |
| Title | Year | UK | US Hot 100 | US AC | US Alt | US Dance | US Rock | NZ | GER | Certifications | Album |
|---|---|---|---|---|---|---|---|---|---|---|---|
| "Favourite Shirts (Boy Meets Girl)" (with Haircut One Hundred) | 1981 | 4 | — | — | — | 41 | 50 | 32 | — | BPI: Silver | Pelican West |
| "Love Plus One" (with Haircut One Hundred) | 1982 | 3 | 37 | — | 18 | 8 | 18 | 22 | — | BPI: Gold | Pelican West |
| "Fantastic Day" (with Haircut One Hundred) | 1982 | 9 | — | — | — | — | — | 29 | — | | Pelican West |
| "Nobody's Fool" (with Haircut One Hundred) | 1982 | 9 | — | — | — | — | — | — | — | | Pelican West Plus |
| "Whistle Down the Wind" | 1983 | 13 | — | 20 | — | — | — | — | — | | North of a Miracle |
| "Take That Situation" | 1983 | 11 | — | — | — | — | — | — | — | | North of a Miracle |
| "Blue Hat for a Blue Day" | 1983 | 14 | — | — | — | — | — | — | — | | North of a Miracle |
| "On a Sunday" | 1983 | 52 | — | — | — | — | — | — | — | | North of a Miracle |
| "Love All Day" | 1984 | 31 | — | — | — | — | — | — | — | | Non-album singles |
| "My Pure Lady" (Japan only) | 1984 | — | — | — | — | — | — | — | — | | Non-album singles |
| "Warning Sign" | 1984 | 25 | — | — | — | — | — | — | — | | Non-album singles |
| "Laura" | 1985 | 45 | — | — | — | — | — | — | — | | Non-album singles |
| "Over the Weekend" | 1986 | 43 | — | — | — | — | — | — | — | | Postcards from Home |
| "Goodbye Yesterday" | 1986 | 82 | — | — | — | — | — | — | — | | Postcards from Home |
| "You're My World" | 1988 | 67 | — | — | — | — | — | — | — | | I Love You Avenue |
| "Tell Me Why" | 1989 | — | — | — | — | — | — | — | — | | I Love You Avenue |
| "Kite" | 1993 | 44 | 107 | — | 4 | — | — | — | — | | From Monday to Sunday |
| "He Doesn't Love You Like I Do" | 1993 | 58 | — | — | — | — | — | — | 55 | | From Monday to Sunday |
| "The World" | 1995 | 47 | — | — | — | — | — | — | — | | Tangled |
| "Rollerblade" | 1996 | 37 | — | — | — | — | — | — | — | | Tangled |
| "Today" | 1997 | — | — | — | — | — | — | — | — | | The Apple Bed |
| "The Man You Used to Be" | 1997 | — | — | — | — | — | — | — | — | | The Apple Bed |
| "Stars in Her Eyes" | 1998 | — | — | — | — | — | — | — | — | | The Apple Bed |
| "Baby Blue Sky" / "Mountaintop" | 2017 | — | — | — | — | — | — | — | — | | Woodland Echoes |
| "Perfect Sunday Sun" | 2017 | — | — | — | — | — | — | — | — | | Woodland Echoes |
| "The Stars" | 2018 | — | — | — | — | — | — | — | — | | Woodland Echoes |
| "The Unloving Plum" (with Haircut One Hundred) | 2024 | — | — | — | — | — | — | — | — | | Boxing the Compass |
| "Dynamite" (with Haircut One Hundred) | 2025 | — | — | — | — | — | — | — | — | | Boxing the Compass |
| "Come Back to Me" (with Haircut One Hundred) | 2026 | — | — | — | — | — | — | — | — | | Boxing the Compass |
"—" denotes a recording that did not chart or was not released in that territory.

- "Whistle Down the Wind" additionally charted at No. 20 on the Billboard Adult Contemporary chart.
- "Kite" charted at No. 7 on the Billboard Bubbling Under Hot 100 Singles chart.

== See also ==
- List of performances on Top of the Pops
- List of acts who appeared on American Bandstand
- List of Never Mind the Buzzcocks episodes
- List of people from Beckenham
