= Haircut One Hundred =

British pop group

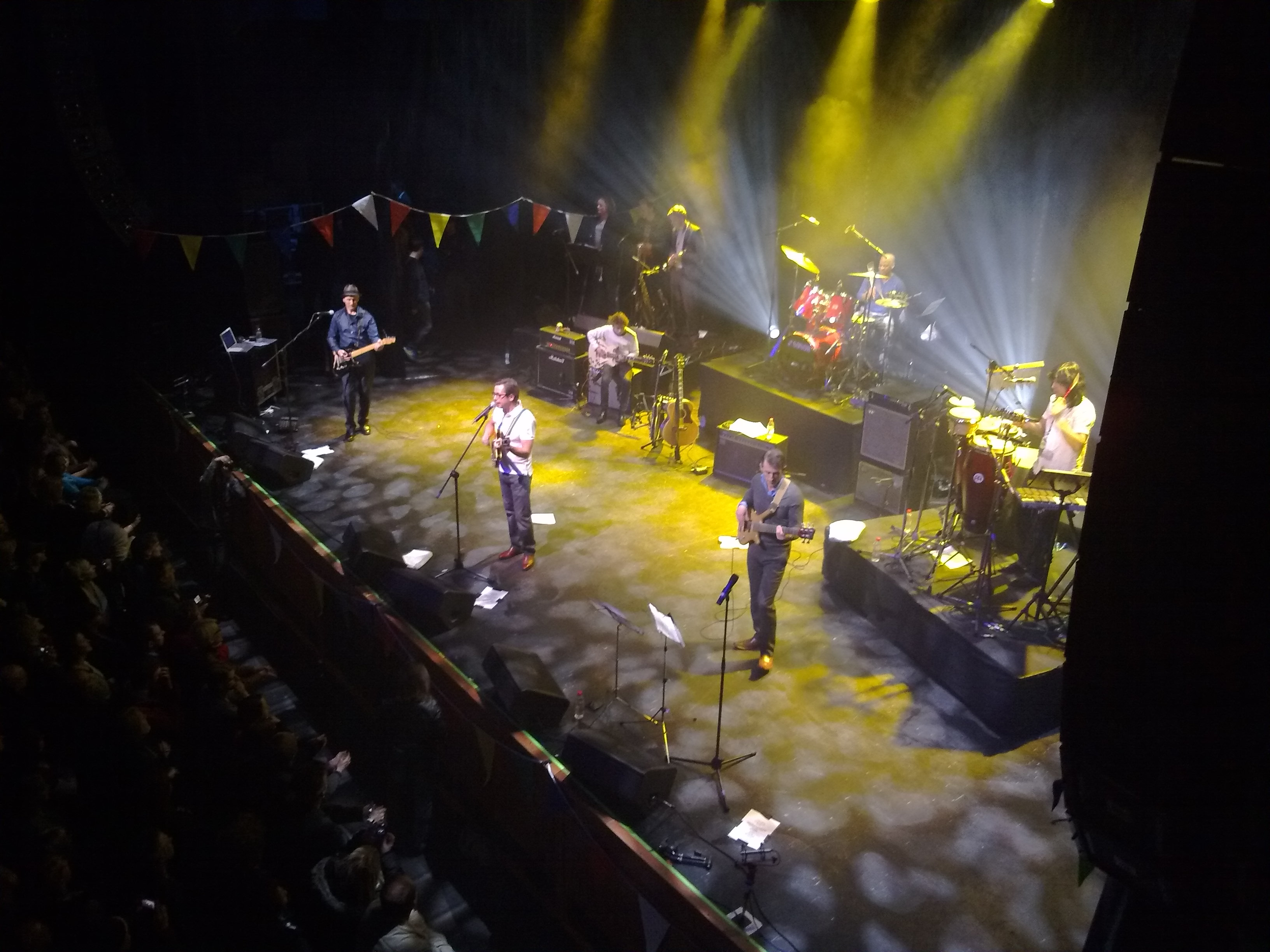
- Haircut One Hundred performing in January 2011

Background information
- Also known as: Haircut 100
- Origin: Beckenham, London, England
- Genres: New wave; new pop; jazz-funk; Brit funk
- Years active: 1980–1984; 2004; 2009–2013; 2023–present
- Labels: Polydor; Arista
- Members: Nick Heyward; Les Nemes; Graham Jones; Blair Cunningham
- Past members: Patrick Hunt; Phil Smith; Marc Fox

Haircut One Hundred (also Haircut 100) are a British pop group formed in 1980 in Beckenham, London, by Nick Heyward, Les Nemes and Graham Jones. In 1981 and 1982, the band scored four UK top-10 singles: "Favourite Shirts (Boy Meets Girl)", "Love Plus One", "Nobody's Fool", and "Fantastic Day".

== History ==
=== Formation and Pelican West ===
Nick Heyward and Les Nemes had been in several bands together since 1977. They gigged under the names Rugby, Boat Party, and Captain Pennyworth, but did not release any music. Their last band together, Moving England, with Sex Gang Children's Rob Stroud, released one single. According to Nemes, in their early years they "hopped on every bandwagon going", experimenting with different musical styles including punk rock, ska and mod.

Heyward and Nemes moved to London in 1980 where they recruited friend and guitarist Graham Jones. During a meeting brainstorming band name ideas, Heyward suggested Haircut One Hundred and because it was the one "that made us laugh the most" they kept it. The three were joined by drummer Patrick Hunt. Managed by Karl Adams, the band recorded some demos. Phil Smith played saxophone on the sessions and he joined the group, followed by percussionist Marc Fox. The group played some live dates and were signed by Arista Records in 1981. They entered Chalk Farm's Roundhouse studios to record their debut single, "Favourite Shirts (Boy Meets Girl)", which became their first hit, reaching No. 4 on the UK Singles Chart in late 1981, and resulted in their first appearance on BBC Television's Top of the Pops.

For the recording of their debut album, Pelican West, Blair Cunningham replaced Hunt on drums. Their second single, "Love Plus One", was released in January 1982 and gave the band their second UK top 10 hit. Pelican West was released in February, reaching No. 2 on the UK Albums Chart. The band became internationally famous and toured the globe. "Love Plus One" reached the US top 40, and they secured further UK top 10 hits in 1982 with the singles "Fantastic Day" and "Nobody's Fool".

=== Heyward leaves and Paint and Paint ===
In late 1982, tensions began arising within the band as they struggled to record new material, which were exacerbated when Heyward refused to attend recording sessions. Eventually, in January 1983, the band's forthcoming single, "Whistle Down the Wind", was postponed and a statement was issued confirming that the band and Heyward were parting company. At the time, Heyward told Smash Hits magazine that he had been contemplating going solo for some time and had already recorded some tracks with session musicians. However, many years later, Heyward stated that he had been struggling with stress and depression at the time after a year of constant work and pressure, which led to him being, in effect, sacked by the other members of the band. With the loss of the band's frontman and main songwriter, Fox took over vocal duties and the band continued to write material themselves (several B-sides during Heyward's tenure had been credited to the whole band). The band left Arista and signed with Polydor Records, and released a single called "Prime Time" which spent five weeks inside the top 75 but failed to get any higher than number 46.

Further singles by this line-up, such as "So Tired", failed to reach the UK top 40 and their follow-up album, Paint and Paint (1984) failed to chart. The band split up soon after. Heyward, however, had embarked on a successful solo career in 1983, and scored several chart hits (including the aforementioned song "Whistle Down the Wind", which was his first solo release in March 1983) and a top 10 album, North of a Miracle. Blair Cunningham joined the Pretenders for their Get Close album, while Graham Jones joined future Corduroy members Ben and Scott Addison in the proto-Britpop act Boys Wonder.

=== Reunions ===
In 2004, more than 20 years after their split, Haircut One Hundred (including Heyward) reunited for the VH1 show Bands Reunited and performed "Love Plus One" and "Fantastic Day". There were no further appearances from the band until five years later in 2009, when they rekindled their friendship via Facebook, and Heyward invited the rest of the band to perform at one of his solo gigs. The band (comprising Heyward, Jones, Nemes and Cunningham) then played London's Indig02 on 28 January 2011, performing Pelican West in its entirety. The performance was recorded and released as a live CD. In 2013, the band's official website stated that they had been working on new material together; however, it has not been released.

Though he did not mention new Haircut One Hundred material, Heyward commented in 2017 interviews that he has a "deep love" for the band, and is "ever hopeful" that the band will eventually reform for a reunion show at the Roundhouse.

In November 2022, Heyward announced on his Facebook page that the Pelican West album was due for a new Super Deluxe 4CD re-issue in early 2023. To celebrate the forthcoming release, Haircut One Hundred featured in a BBC Radio 2 Piano Room session on 16 February 2023, in which they played a cover of Harry Styles' "As It Was". They also announced a warm-up show at the O2 Academy Oxford on 6 May 2023, and a one off show at the O2 Shepherd's Bush Empire, London, on 12 May 2023. In June 2023, the band announced a UK tour in October and November 2023 at which old and new material was to be played. Heyward confirmed on his Patreon website that a new album's worth of material had been written.

In 2024, Haircut 100 toured the United States and Canada as the opening band for ABC and Howard Jones, playing 18 shows in August and September and released the single, "The Unloving Plum".

In October 2025, Haircut 100 announced that their first album in over 40 years, Boxing the Compass, would be released on 19 June 2026 with a headline tour in May 2026.

== Band members ==
=== Current members ===
- Nick Heyward – lead vocals, guitar (1980–1983, 2004, 2009–2013, 2023–present)
- Les Nemes – bass (1980–1984, 2004, 2009–2013, 2023–present)
- Graham Jones – guitar (1980–1984, 2004, 2009–2013, 2023–present)
- Blair Cunningham – drums (1981–1984, 2004, 2009–2013, 2023–present)

=== Former members ===
- Patrick Hunt – drums (1980-1981)
- Phil Smith – saxophone (1980–1984, 2004, 2009–2013)
- Marc Fox – percussion, backing and occasional lead vocals (1980–1984, 2004, 2009–2013)

== Discography ==
=== Studio albums ===
Year	Album details	Peak chart positions						Certifications (sales thresholds)
Year	Album details	UK	AUS	CAN	NZ	SWE	US	Certifications (sales thresholds)
1982	Pelican West: Released: 26 February 1982; Label: Arista	2	27	23	12	29	31	BPI: Platinum
1984	Paint and Paint: Released: 6 July 1984; Label: Polydor	–	–	–	–	–	–	
2026	Boxing the Compass: Released: 19 June 2026; Label: Map of England Records	35	–	–	–	–	–	

=== Singles ===
Year	Title	Peak chart positions							Certifications (sales thresholds)	Album
Year	Title	UK	AUS	CAN	IRE	FRA	NZ	US	Certifications (sales thresholds)	Album
1981	"Favourite Shirts (Boy Meets Girl)"	4	97	-	14	-	32	101	BPI: Silver	Pelican West
1982	"Love Plus One"	3	10	4	5	3	22	37	BPI: Gold	Pelican West
1982	"Fantastic Day"	9	85	-	7	-	29	-		Pelican West
1982	"Nobody's Fool"	9	-	-	10	-	-	-		Non-album single
1983	"Prime Time"	46	-	-	-	-	-	-		Paint and Paint
1983	"So Tired"	94	-	-	-	-	-	-		Paint and Paint
1984	"Too Up, Two Down"	125	-	-	-	-	-	-		Paint and Paint
2024	"The Unloving Plum"	-	-	-	-	-	-	-		Boxing the Compass
2025	"Dynamite"	-	-	-	-	-	-	-		Boxing the Compass
2026	"Come Back to Me"	-	-	-	-	-	-	-		Boxing the Compass

=== Live albums ===
Year	Album
2011	Live at the IndigO2 28 January 2011: Label: Abbey Road Live Here Now; Format: CD
2023	Haircut 100% Live! Hammersmith Odeon Spring 1982: Label: Demon Records; Format: LP

=== Compilations ===
Year	Album
1989	Nick Heyward & Haircut One Hundred – The Best of Nick Heyward & Haircut One Hundred: Label: Arista; Format: CD
1994	Haircut One Hundred & Nick Heyward – The Very Best of Haircut 100 & Nick Heyward: Label: BMG; Format: CD
1996	Nick Heyward & Haircut One Hundred – The Greatest Hits of Nick Heyward & Haircut One Hundred: Label: Camden / BMG; Format: CD
2003	Nick Heyward & Haircut One Hundred – The Very Best Of…: Label: Camden / BMG; Format: CD
2009	Nick Heyward, Haircut One Hundred – Favourite Songs: The Best Of: Label: Sony; Format: CD
