= Ian Shaw (producer) =

Record engineer and producer

Ian Shaw is an English record producer and recording engineer; he is the owner of the British independent record label Warm Fuzz Records. He is also a member of The Music Producers Guild. Shaw has engineered and produced over 100 albums.

In 2012, Shaw relocated his studio to a houseboat in Key West, Florida, where he also hosts a weekly indie and unsigned radio show for Pirate Radio Key West on WKYZ.
