= Les Nemes =

English bassist

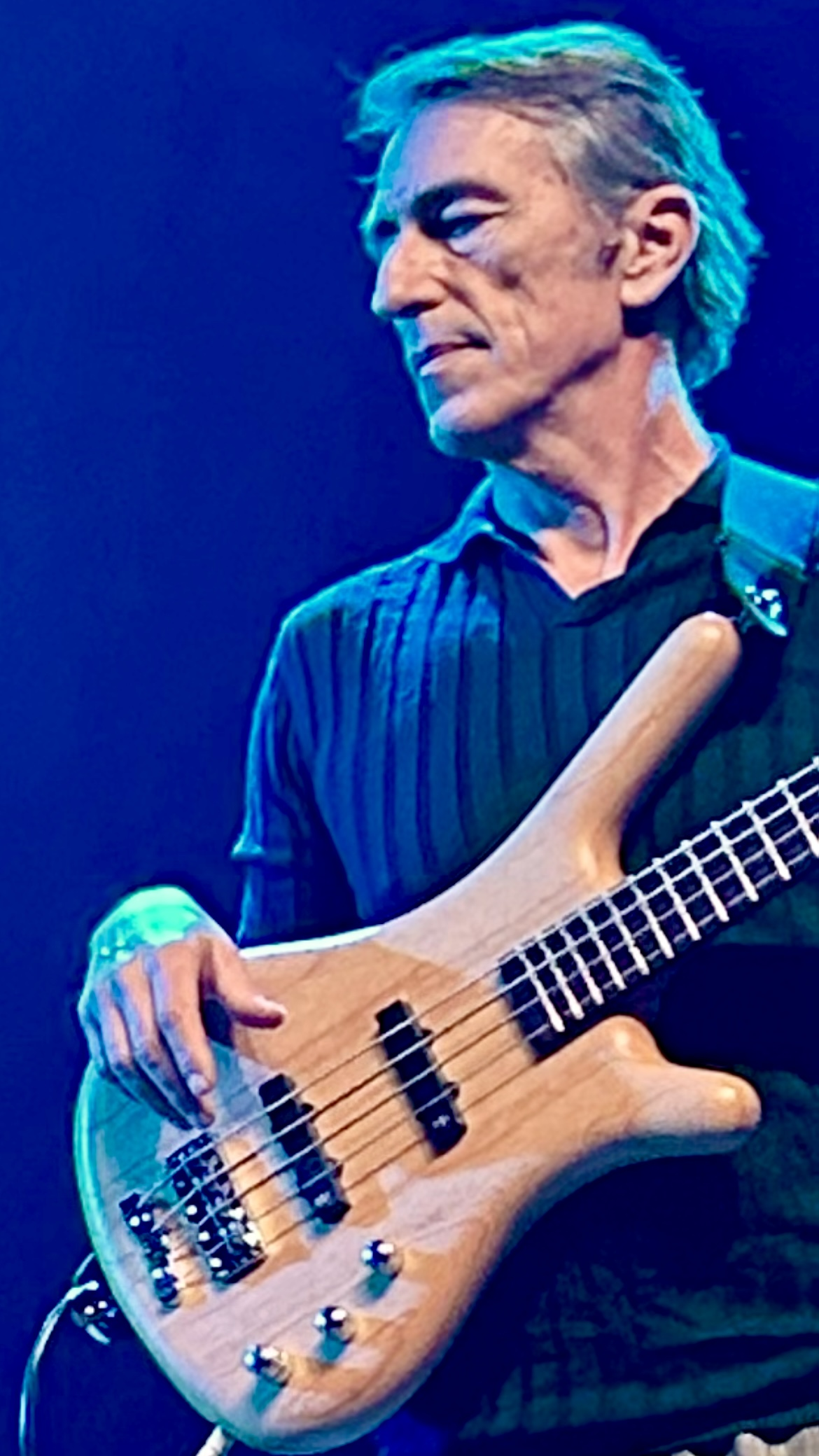
- Nemes performing with Haircut One Hundred at the O_{2} Ritz in Manchester, 2023

Background information
- Born: Leslie Alexander Nemes; 5 December 1960 (age 65); Croydon, Surrey, England
- Genres: New pop; new wave; jazz-funk; Brit funk
- Occupation: Bassist
- Instrument: Bass guitar
- Years active: 1980–present
- Member of: Haircut One Hundred

Leslie Alexander Nemes (born 5 December 1960) is an English bassist. After he and singer-songwriter and guitarist Nick Heyward had been in other bands together, the pair formed Haircut One Hundred in 1980. The band enjoyed considerable success in the early 1980s including a top-5 album and four top-10 singles in the UK.

Heyward left Haircut One Hundred in early 1983 but Nemes remained with the band for its second and final studio album, Paint and Paint (1984). The album was a commercial failure and the band broke up.

Nemes went on to tour and record as a session musician for Hugh Masekela, Chris Rea, Friends Again, China Crisis and Rick Astley.

Nemes moved to Spain in 2003.

Since 2004, after appearing on the VH1 show Bands Reunited, Haircut One Hundred (including Nemes and Heyward) have re-formed on several occasions.
