= Dexys Midnight Runners discography =

Band discography

- Studio albums: 7
- Live albums: 4
- Compilation albums: 10
- Singles: 26
- Video albums: 4

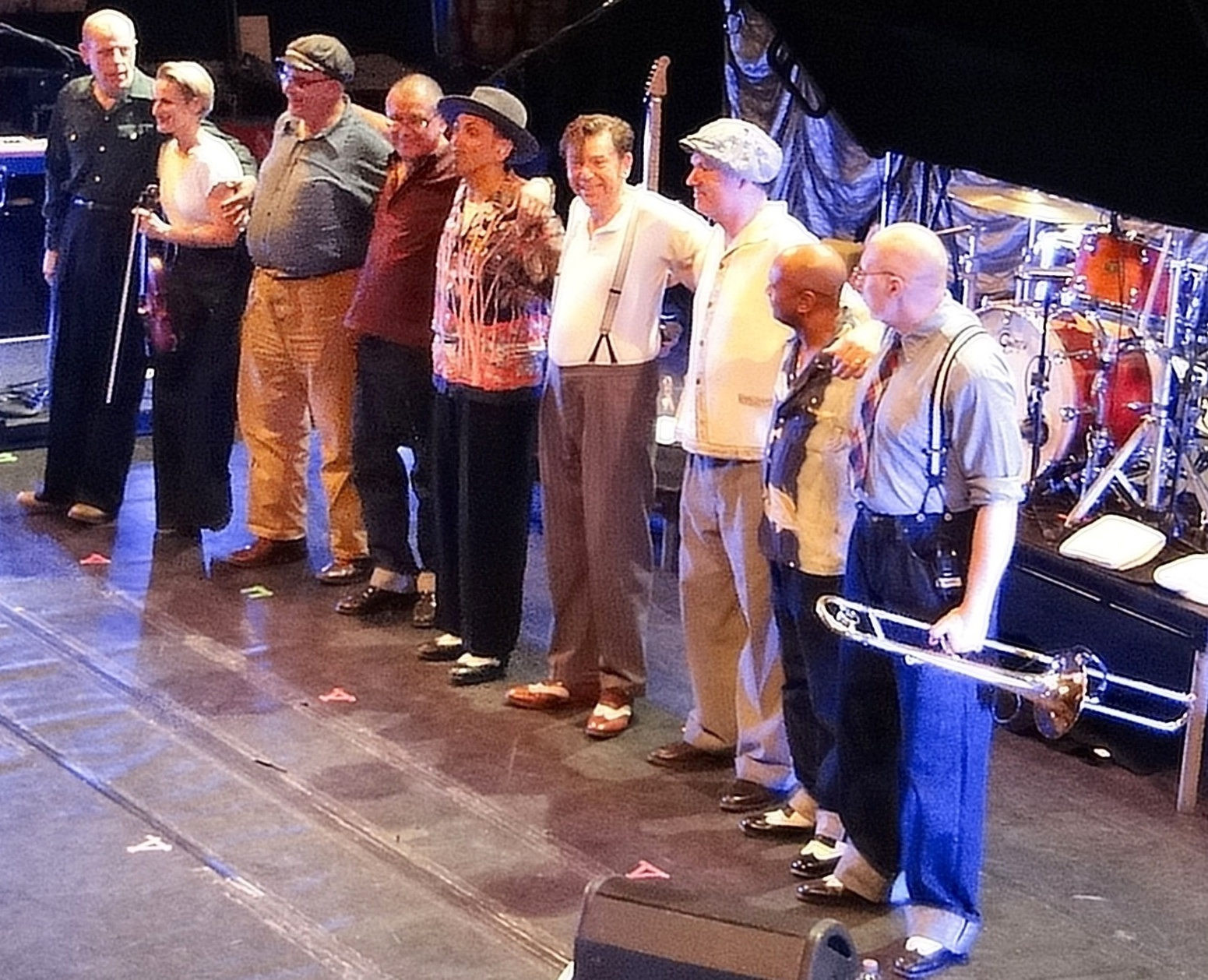
Dexys on stage at Cambridge Corn Exchange in 2012

This is the discography of British pop rock band Dexys Midnight Runners, known officially from 2003 to 2026 as Dexys.

== Albums ==
=== Studio albums ===
Title	Album details	Peak chart positions										Certifications
Title	Album details	UK	AUS	AUT	CAN	GER	NL	NOR	NZ	SWE	US	Certifications
Searching for the Young Soul Rebels	Released: 11 July 1980; Label: Parlophone, EMI; Formats: LP, MC	6	66	—	—	—	—	—	11	31	—	UK: Silver
Too-Rye-Ay	Released: 22 July 1982; Label: Mercury; Formats: LP, MC, 8-track	2	2	—	10	29	9	22	2	22	14	AUS: Platinum; CAN: Gold; NZ: Platinum; UK: Platinum
Don't Stand Me Down	Released: 13 September 1985; Label: Mercury; Formats: CD, LP, MC	22	—	—	—	—	—	—	—	—	—	
One Day I'm Going to Soar	Released: 4 June 2012; Label: BMG; Formats: CD, 2×LP, digital download	13	—	15	—	55	—	27	—	33	—	
Let the Record Show: Dexys Do Irish and Country Soul	Released: 3 June 2016; Label: 100%, The Orchard; Formats: CD, 2×CD, 2×LP, digital download	10	—	—	—	—	—	—	—	—	—	
The Feminine Divine	Released: 28 July 2023; Label: 100%, The Orchard	6	—	—	—	100	—	—	—	—	—	
Love	Released: 4 September 2026; Label: Heavenly	20	—	—	—	—	—	—	—	—	—	
"—" denotes releases that did not chart or were not released in that territory.

=== Live albums ===
Title	Album details	Peak chart positions
Title	Album details	UK
BBC Radio One Live in Concert	Released: November 1993; Label: Windsong; Formats: CD; Recorded on 6 June 1982	—
At the Royal Court	Released: 29 October 2012; Label: Audio Visual Fidelity; Formats: CD+DVD; Recorded on 7 November 2003 at the Liverpool Royal Court Theatre	—
Nowhere Is Home	Released: 20 October 2014; Label: Absolute; Formats: 3×CD, 4×LP; Recorded over three days in April 2013 at the Duke of York's Theatre	79
The Feminine Devine + Dexys Classics: Live!	Released: 24 May 2024 (streaming), 31 May 2024 (vinyl), 7 June 2024 (CD); Label: 100% Records; Formats: 2×CD, 3×LP; Recorded during September 2023 Tour	
"—" denotes releases that did not chart.

=== Compilation albums ===
Title	Album details	Peak chart positions	Certifications
Title	Album details	UK	Certifications
Geno	Released: March 1983; Label: EMI; Formats: LP, MC	79	
The Very Best of Dexys Midnight Runners	Released: 21 May 1991; Label: Mercury; Formats: CD, LP, MC	12	UK: Gold
Because of You	Released: May 1993; Label: Spectrum Music; Formats: CD, MC	—	
1980–1982 – The Radio 1 Sessions	Released: July 1995; Label: Nighttracks; Formats: CD; Collection of tracks from various sessions	—	
It Was Like This	Released: 20 May 1996; Label: EMI; Formats: CD; Reissue of Searching for the Young Soul Rebels with B-sides and some alternative mixes	—	
Master Series	Released: 1 July 1996; Label: Mercury; Formats: CD	—	
Let's Make This Precious: The Best of Dexys Midnight Runners	Released: 22 September 2003; Label: EMI; Formats: CD	75	UK: Silver
The Projected Passion Revue	Released: 29 January 2007; Label: Mercury; Formats: CD; Includes mainly BBC tracks (recorded live at the Paris Theatre and in session at Maida Vale Studios) as well as the A and B sides of three singles	156	
The Collection	Released: August 2008; Label: Universal UMC/Woolworths Worthit!; Formats: CD	—	
20th Century Masters – The Best of Dexy's Midnight Runners	Released: 24 February 2009; Label: Universal Music; Formats: CD	—	
"—" denotes releases that did not chart or were not released in that territory.

=== Video albums ===
Title	Album details
The Bridge	Released: April 1983; Label: Polygram Video; Formats: VHS, LaserDisc
It Was Like This – Live	Released: 30 August 2004; Label: ILC Music; Formats: DVD
At the Royal Court	Released: 29 October 2012; Label: Audio Visual Fidelity; Formats: CD+DVD; Repackaging of It Was Like This – Live
Nowhere Is Home	Released: 20 October 2014; Label: Absolute/Heavenly Films; Formats: 2×DVD

== Singles ==
Title	Year	Peak chart positions										Certifications	Album
Title	Year	UK	AUS	BEL (FL)	CAN	GER	IRE	NL	NZ	SWI	US	Certifications	Album
"Dance Stance"	1979	40	—	—	—	—	—	—	—	—	—		Non-album single
"Geno"	1980	1	44	—	—	—	2	—	—	—	—	UK: Silver	Searching for the Young Soul Rebels
"There, There, My Dear"	1980	7	—	—	—	—	—	—	—	—	—		Searching for the Young Soul Rebels
"Thankfully Not Living in Yorkshire It Doesn't Apply" (France-only release)	1980	—	—	—	—	—	—	—	—	—	—		Searching for the Young Soul Rebels
"Seven Days Too Long" (Canada-only release)	1980	—	—	—	—	—	—	—	—	—	—		Searching for the Young Soul Rebels
"Keep It Part Two (Inferiority Part One)"	1980	—	—	—	—	—	—	—	—	—	—		Searching for the Young Soul Rebels
"Plan B"	1981	58	—	—	—	—	—	—	—	—	—		Too-Rye-Ay
"Show Me"	1981	16	—	—	—	—	21	—	—	—	—		Too-Rye-Ay
"Liars A to E"	1981	—	—	—	—	—	—	—	—	—	—		Too-Rye-Ay
"The Celtic Soul Brothers"	1982	45	—	—	—	—	—	—	—	—	—		Too-Rye-Ay
"Come On Eileen"	1982	1	1	1	2	6	1	7	1	1	1	AUS: Gold; CAN: Gold; GER: Gold; NZ: 6× Platinum; UK: 4× Platinum	Too-Rye-Ay
"Jackie Wilson Said (I'm in Heaven When You Smile)"	1982	5	67	14	—	62	6	16	—	—	—		Too-Rye-Ay
"Let's Get This Straight (From the Start)"/"Old"	1982	17	—	—	—	—	9	—	—	—	—		Non-album single
"Geno" (re-release)	1983	81	—	—	—	—	—	—	—	—	—		Geno
"The Celtic Soul Brothers" (re-release)	1983	20	—	—	—	—	13	—	—	—	86		Too-Rye-Ay
"One of Those Things" (promo-only release)	1985	—	—	—	—	—	—	—	—	—	—		Don't Stand Me Down
"This Is What She's Like"	1985	78	—	—	—	—	—	—	—	—	—		Don't Stand Me Down
"Because of You"	1986	13	—	—	—	—	11	—	—	—	—		Non-album single
"Manhood" (promo-only release)	2003	—	—	—	—	—	—	—	—	—	—		Let's Make This Precious: The Best of Dexys Midnight Runners
"She Got a Wiggle"	2012	—	—	—	—	—	—	—	—	—	—		One Day I'm Going to Soar
"Free"	2012	—	—	—	—	—	—	—	—	—	—		One Day I'm Going to Soar
"Incapable of Love"	2012	—	—	—	—	—	—	—	—	—	—		One Day I'm Going to Soar
"I'm Always Going to Love You"	2013	—	—	—	—	—	—	—	—	—	—		One Day I'm Going to Soar
"Nowhere Is Home" (limited release)	2014	—	—	—	—	—	—	—	—	—	—		Nowhere Is Home
"Grazing in the Grass"	2016	—	—	—	—	—	—	—	—	—	—		Let the Record Show: Dexys Do Irish and Country Soul
"My Life in England Pt. 1"	2026	—	—	—	—	—	—	—	—	—	—		Love
"—" denotes releases that did not chart or were not released in that territory.
