= BBC Radio One Live in Concert (Dexys Midnight Runners album) =

BBC Radio One in Concert

Live album by Dexys Midnight Runners
- Released: November 1993
- Recorded: June 6, 1982
- Genre: New wave, blue-eyed soul
- Length: 54:07
- Label: Windsong International

Dexys Midnight Runners chronology
Because of You (1993)	BBC Radio One in Concert (1993)	1980–1982: The Radio One Sessions (1995)

Professional ratings
Review scores
Source	Rating
Allmusic	4/5 stars

BBC Radio One Live in Concert is a live album by Dexys Midnight Runners, recorded for the BBC in 1982 and released in 1993. It was the group's first official live album and remained their only official live album until the release of The Projected Passion Revue in 2007 (from a 1981 recording). The album is unique as it is Dexys' only live recording where the members of The Projected Passion Revue horn section (Big Jim Paterson, Paul Speare, and Brian Maurice) are present alongside the Too-Rye-Ay strings (Helen O'Hara and Steve Brennan). Immediately after this concert, the horn section left the group and formed The TKO Horns.

This concert is included in full (including one track, "I'll Show You", omitted from this release) on the second disc of the 2007 Too-Rye-Ay Deluxe Edition release.

== Track listing ==
1. "TSOP (The Sound of Philadelphia)" (Kenneth Gamble, Leon Huff) – 4:19
2. "Burn It Down" (Rowland) – 3:58
3. "Let's Make This Precious" (Paterson, Rowland) – 4:18
4. "Jackie Wilson Said (I'm in Heaven When You Smile)" (Van Morrison) – 3:07
5. "Come on Eileen" (Adams, Billingham, Paterson, Rowland) – 6:30
6. "Respect" (Otis Redding) – 6:25
7. "Soon" (Paterson, Rowland) – 1:34
8. "Plan B" (Paterson, Rowland) – 4:04
9. "Geno" (Paterson, Rowland) – 3:29
10. "Old" (Paterson, Rowland) – 4:36
11. "The Celtic Soul Brothers" (Billingham, Paterson, Rowland) – 2:47
12. "There, There, My Dear" (Archer, Rowland) – 5:22
13. "Show Me" (Paterson, Rowland) – 3:38

== Personnel ==
- Kevin Rowland – guitar, vocals
- Seb Shelton – drums
- Giorgio Kilkenny – bass
- Kevin "Billy" Adams – banjo, guitar
- Mickey Billingham – organ, piano, accordion
- "Big" Jim Paterson – trombone
- Paul Speare – saxophone, flute, tin whistle
- Brian Maurice – saxophone
- Helen O'Hara – violin
- Steve Brennan – violin
