= The Celtic Soul Brothers =

Song by Dexys Midnight Runners

Single by Dexys Midnight Runners

from the album Too-Rye-Ay
- B-side: "Love (Part 2) (7-inch); "Reminisce (Part 1)" (12-inch)
- Released: March 1982
- Recorded: 1981–1982
- Genre: Folk rock; Irish folk; blue-eyed soul
- Length: 3:08
- Label: Mercury
- Songwriters: Kevin Rowland, Jim "Big Jim" Paterson, Mickey Billingham
- Producers: Clive Langer, Alan Winstanley

Dexys Midnight Runners singles chronology
"Liars A to E" (1981)	"The Celtic Soul Brothers" (1982)	"Come on Eileen" (1982)

"The Celtic Soul Brothers" (known as "The Celtic Soul Brothers (More, Please, Thank You)" on the album version) is a song by Dexys Midnight Runners, written by band members Mickey Billingham, Jimmy Paterson and Kevin Rowland.

== Background ==
"The Celtic Soul Brothers" was first released by Mercury Records in March 1982 as a single. It was also the first song on Dexys Midnight Runners' 1982 album Too-Rye-Ay. The song was the first song recorded and released by the revamped Dexys Midnight Runners' lineup, which added fiddle players Helen O'Hara, Steve Brennan and Roger MacDuff and bassist Giorgio Kilkenny. Reflecting the revised lineup, the song features mandolins and violins rather than the horn fanfares featured in the group's earlier work. The song was inspired by 1960s soul music, and co-writer Mickey Billingham has stated that The Whispers' song "Needle in a Haystack" was a particular influence, accounting for "The Celtic Soul Brothers"'s unusual melody. Co-writer and Dexys Midnight Runners lead singer Kevin Rowland has stated that the song was about him and Dexys Midnight Runners trombone player Big Jimmy Paterson, Rowland being Irish and Paterson being Scottish. Rowland also stated the song expresses his devotion to the band.

== Critical reception ==
Author Richard White called the song "a stand aside, effervescent statement." Critic Ned Raggett of Allmusic referred to the song as a highlight of Too-Rye-Ay. Ira Robbins of Trouser Press referred to the song as "jolly, rollicking jug band fare." Author Simon Reynolds called the song "a manifesto of a single." Julie Burchill of New Musical Express remarked that although the song is intended to sound ethnically Celtic, it sounds more like a "Redcoat romp." Author Maury Dean claimed that this song was an inspiration for Roddy Doyle's 1987 novel The Commitments, which was made into a 1991 film.

== Personnel ==
- Seb Shelton – drums
- Giorgio Kilkenny – bass guitar
- Big Jimmy Paterson – trombone
- Mickey Billingham – organ and piano
- Paul Speare – tenor saxophone
- Billy Adams – guitar
- Brian Maurice – alto sax
- Kevin Rowland – vocals

=== "The Emerald Express" ===
- Helen O’Hara – violin
- Steve Brennan – violin

== Chart performance ==
It reached #45 in the UK on its initial release, and #20 in the UK and #86 in the US when re-released in March 1983. The song also reached #13 on the Irish charts.

== Performances in other media ==
- When the band appeared as musical guests on Saturday Night Live after the release of "Come On Eileen", this song was their second-half performance.
- It has also been included on a number of Dexys Midnight Runners' compilation albums, including The Very Best of Dexys Midnight Runners, Because of You, Let's Make This Precious: The Best of Dexys Midnight Runners and 20th Century Masters: The Best of Dexy's Midnight Runners.
- A live version of the song, recorded shortly after the single release, is included on BBC Radio One Live in Concert.

== Popular culture ==
- "The Celtic Soul Brothers" was included on the soundtrack of the 1983 movie Breathless starring Richard Gere.
