= The Projected Passion Revue =

Compilation album by Dexys Midnight Runners
- Released: January 2007
- Recorded: 1981
- Genre: New wave, blue-eyed soul
- Label: Mercury

Dexys Midnight Runners chronology
| Let's Make This Precious: The Best of Dexys Midnight Runners (2003) | The Projected Passion Revue (2007) | 20th Century Masters: The Best of Dexys Midnight Runners (2009) |

The Projected Passion Revue is a compilation album by the group Dexys Midnight Runners, comprising recordings made in 1981, between the group's first album Searching for the Young Soul Rebels and its second, Too-Rye-Ay. The album represents a stage in the group's development which built upon the blue-eyed soul sound of the original line-up, but came before the group's adoption of a significant folk influence (and the addition of The Emerald Express string section to the line-up).

The album includes the A and B sides of Dexys Midnight Runners' three 1981 singles, three tracks recorded in session for Radio 1, and a live recording of a show in Dexys' "Projected Passion Revue" tour.

It was given a 8.0 rating by Pitchfork.

== Track listing ==
1. "Plan B" (single)
2. "Soul Finger" (single B-side)
3. Dialogue - Introduction by Gary Crowley (live)
4. "Outlook" (a.k.a. "Dubious" and "Spiritual Passion") (live)
5. "Tell Me When My Light Turns Green" (live)
6. "Soon/Plan B" (live)
7. "Burn It Down" (live)
8. "Respect" (live)
9. "Until I Believe in My Soul" (live)
10. "There There My Dear" (live)
11. "Your Own" (a.k.a. "Liars A to E) (live)
12. "Breaking Down The Walls of Heartache" (live)
13. "Let's Make This Precious" (session)
14. "Your Own" (a.k.a. "Liars A to E") (session)
15. "Until I Believe in My Soul" (session)
16. "Show Me" (single)
17. "Soon" (single B-side)
18. "Liars A to E" (single)
19. "And Yes We Must Remain The Wildhearted Outsiders" (single B-side)
- Tracks 1 & 2 originally a single released March 1981
- Tracks 3–12 recorded live at Paris Theatre, London, May 30, 1981
- Tracks 13–15 recorded for Richard Skinner session, July 9, 1981
- Tracks 16 & 17 originally a single released July 1981
- Tracks 18 & 19 originally a single released October 1981

== Personnel ==
- Kevin Rowland - vocals
- Billy Adams - guitar
- Steve Wynne - bass
- Micky Billingham - organ, piano
- Seb Shelton - drums
- Paul Speare - tenor saxophone
- Brian Maurice - alto saxophone
- "Big" Jim Paterson - trombone
