= The Wanderer (Kevin Rowland album) =

Studio album by Kevin Rowland
- Released: 1988
- Studio: Duplex Sound, New York City
- Genre: Rock; Celtic folk; country; dance; lounge-pop
- Label: Mercury
- Producer: Eumir Deodato

Kevin Rowland chronology
The Wanderer (1988)	My Beauty (1999)

Professional ratings
Review scores
Source	Rating
Allmusic	4/5 stars

The Wanderer is a solo album by Kevin Rowland, lead singer of Dexys Midnight Runners. It was released in 1988 as his solo debut, three years after the third Dexys album, Don't Stand Me Down.

The commercial failure of Don't Stand Me Down had caused Rowland to go into depression, and despite a return to the charts by Dexys in 1986 with the single "Because of You", the other two members of Dexys (Helen O'Hara and Billy Adams) left the group in early 1987, as neither felt ready to go through another challenge as arduous as the recording of the previous album. In addition, Rowland and O'Hara's personal relationship had also come to an end. Nevertheless, Rowland pushed on with a solo album composed entirely of originals except for one cover.

Rowland changed his sound from the soul influences of Dexys to a blend of folk, rock, and country, heavily influenced by electronic dance music. To aid in that transition, Rowland (unusually) chose to work with the Brazilian producer and electronic musician Eumir Deodato, with the support of a group of session musicians that included pedal steel guitarist Eric Weissberg.

Despite some critical praise, the album fared poorly at retail, which caused Rowland to quit music; his next solo album followed 11 years later.

== Track listing ==
All tracks composed by Kevin Rowland; except where indicated

1. "Young Man"
2. "Walk Away"
3. "You'll Be the One for Me"
4. "Heartaches by the Number" (Harlan Howard)
5. "I Am a Wanderer"
6. "Tonight"
7. "When You Walk Alone"
8. "Age Can't Wither You"
9. "I Want"
10. "Remember Me" (Helen O'Hara, Rowland)

== Personnel ==
- Kevin Rowland – vocals, guitar, piano
- Bing Bingham, Bob Rigani, Eric Troyer, Rory Dodd – backing vocals
- Charles Kennedy – bass
- Angelo Earl, Jay Berliner, Marc Mueller – guitar
- Eric Weissberg – pedal steel guitar
- Eumir Deodato – keyboards
- Bob Malach – saxophone
