= This Is What She's Like =

1985 song by Dexys Midnight Runners

- Cover of the UK single

Song by Dexys Midnight Runners

from the album Don't Stand Me Down
- Released: November 1985
- Length: 12:23 (album version)
- Songwriters: Kevin Rowland; Billy Adams; Helen O'Hara
- Producers: Kevin Rowland; Alan Winstanley

Music video
- "This Is What She's Like" on YouTube

"This Is What She's Like" is a song by Dexys Midnight Runners, released on their third studio album Don't Stand Me Down in September 1985 by Mercury Records, and in November 1985 as a single. The song is credited to Kevin Rowland, Billy Adams, and Helen O'Hara, with production by Rowland and Alan Winstanley. The song, inspired by Rowland's relationship with O'Hara, includes spoken conversations between Rowland and Adams. Rather than answering Adams's repeated in-song question about what "she" is like, Rowland contrasts the "she" of the title with people who irritate him, for example those who put creases in their jeans, and members of the Campaign for Nuclear Disarmament.

The music changes throughout the song, with critics noting an apparent influence of work by the Beach Boys. The song and album received a mixed critical response, and the single was not a commercial success, peaking at number 78 on the UK Singles Chart.

== Composition and lyrical interpretation ==
The lyrics to "This Is What She's Like" were written by Kevin Rowland about his relationship with fellow Dexys Midnight Runners member Helen O'Hara. Rowland told Chris Roberts of Uncut in 2002 that "I'd fallen for Helen, see, and my brother said, 'I think the Italians have a word for it.' I think it came from The Godfather, when Michael Corleone's walking through Sicily chilling out after he's shot those two guys in that restaurant. I must've liked the ring of it." Rowland claimed in a 2014 interview that "This song literally came to me as I was going off to sleep. Those words – 'What's she like? Tell me what's she like' – and melodies just came. It didn't sound like anything."

Rowland started composing "This Is What She's Like" in 1983. He taped vocals one evening, and O'Hara began composing the music, on piano, the following day. It was the first song written for the album Don't Stand Me Down (1985). Recording sessions for the album started at Mountain Studios, Montreux, Switzerland, in May 1984, with a group of musicians recruited through auditions working with Rowland, O'Hara, Dexys Midnight Runners member Billy Adams, and Nick Gatfield, who had played on the band's live tour in 1982. The initial recording sessions were not productive, and the group returned to the UK, recruiting Alan Winstanley, who had produced the previous Dexy's album Too-Rye-Ay (1982), to produce, and using Marquis Studios in London. By the end of 1984, little of the album had been completed. After seeing Tim Dancy drumming at an Al Green concert, the group sent him demos of songs including "This Is What She's Like", and Dancy agreed to join the sessions. "This Is What She's Like" was completed soon afterwards.

Adams: "She must be something."
Rowland: "Yeah, she is. The Italians have a word for it."
Adams: "What word – what is it?"
Rowland: "A thunderbolt or something."
Adams: "What, you mean the Italian word for 'thunderbolt'?"
Rowland: "Yeah, something like that. I don't speak Italian myself, you understand. But I knew a man who did."

— Spoken dialogue, from "This Is What She's Like"

The first section of the song consists of a dialogue between Rowland and bandmate Adams, without music. As Rowland explains what "she" is not like, rather than what she is like, the music is soft with elements of folk. At 6 minutes and 50 seconds into the track, the accompanying music has a sound that has been compared to the Beach Boys, and concludes with brass instrument accompaniment like that found in earlier works by Dexys Midnight Runners. During the conversation, Rowland lists various dislikes, including people who put creases in their jeans, and members of the Campaign for Nuclear Disarmament, contrasting them to the titular woman.

Throughout the song, despite promises that he will say what she's like, Rowland as narrator does not do so. Sean O'Hagan of NME said that because of this, the resultant song "sounds like an extended self-parody." Nick Hasted in The Independent describes the song as "the ultimate shaggy dog story of inarticulate, unsatisfiable longing", and Daryl Easlea (2011) refers to it as a "mini-opera".

Discussing the compilation album Let's Make This Precious: The Best of Dexys Midnight Runners in 2003, Rowland said "My biggest regret is that 'This Is What She's Like' wasn't a 10-minute single. I think it might have done for Dexys what 'Bohemian Rhapsody' did for Queen." and stated in a 2016 webchat hosted by The Guardian that he felt that the song was one of the best by Dexys Midnight Runners. In 2004, he said that "These days I wouldn't get so worked up about people with creases in their old Levis".

== Critical reception ==
The song was released on the third Dexys Midnight Runners studio album, Don't Stand Me Down, in September 1985. The album received negative reviews, and Barry Egan of the Sunday Independent wrote in 1997 that the album was "unanimously reviled" when released, although Easlea (2011) claims that this was not the case. The album (which has been re-released in different versions) has, in the intervening years, been hailed by some critics as a "misunderstood masterpiece", and a "lost Eighties classic". Dave Simpson of The Guardian described the album as Rowland's equivalent of Pet Sounds.

"This Is What She's Like" has been identified as the centrepiece of Don't Stand Me Down by several reviewers, including Gavin Martin of The Independent, Simon Price of the same newspaper, in The Mojo Collection: The Ultimate Music Companion (2007), and in 1001 Albums You Must Hear Before You Die. John Kovalic of The Capital Times regarded the song as the album's highlight, while Davis Niewert of the Missoulian stated that it was one of only three good tracks on the album. The track was also singled out by Emily Barker for NME, who called the album "music of astonishing ambition". Uncut's Stephen Trousse, writing in 2012, called the song Rowland's "masterpiece". In the same year, Financial Times reviewer Neil O'Sullivan described it as Rowland's "most ambitious song".

The track was described by Sean O'Hagan as "the single most bizarre escapade yet foisted on an unsuspecting public in the guise of a Dexys song." Simon Mares, in a negative review, called the song a "rambling reprise" of the previous Dexys Midnight Runners album Too-Rye-Ay. Colin Adams of Melody Maker praised the comedy of the song, saying that the opening dialogue was like a sketch from Alas Smith and Jones, before the song becomes more like a Mike Leigh play. Taking a contrary view, John Harrison of The Sydney Morning Herald called the opening of the song "fatuous dialogue" and a waste of time, and also denigrated Rowland's singing. Mares was also critical of the dialogue.

Author Gary Mulholland praises the song effusively, and calls it "a work of bloody-minded ambition by a man completely out of time", claiming that he detects influences of the Pete and Dud, Van Morrison, Lou Reed, folk music, and "deep soul weepies" as well as the Beach Boys on the song. The editors of The Mojo Collection (2007) also detect a Beach Boys influence and comment that the song "merges opaque dialogue" and a "coda of Stax-style horns". Martin wrote that the track "may be the angriest love song ever written", while Roberts feels that it "triumphs as an exhilarating hymn to romance".

Easlea says it was lack of a single release that lead to the album's lack of commercial success, a view shared by Rowland, who had resisted a single being released. In November 1985, various edited versions of the song were released as singles, primarily much shorter edits than the 12-minute album version. The single was dismissed as "ludicrous" by Tom Hibbert in Smash Hits and by Phillipa Hawker in The Age as a "sloppy" attempt to combine "Come on Eileen" and "Caroline No". Tom Harrison called the song a "strangled floppy rhythm and blues" in The Province. The single did not receive much airplay, and reached number 78 in the UK Singles Chart.

A video for the song was produced, with footage from location filming in New York (on 1 May 1985) combined with studio-filmed material. The video includes Rowland running down a deserted Fifth Avenue, and has other shots filmed to look as if he is levitating. It was directed by Jack Hazan, who Rowland approached having met during a 1983 interview for French television. Hazan intended the video to have a theme of "love represented as a form of madness."

== Live performances ==
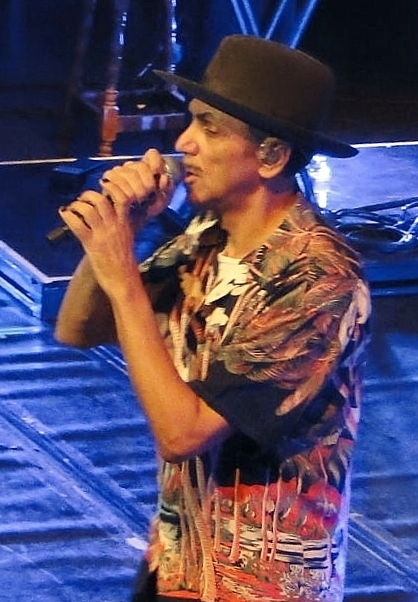
Kevin Rowland performing in 2012

The song was performed on Dexys Midnight Runners' commercially unsuccessful tour in 1985. A review by Robin Denselow in The Guardian stated that the performance of "This Is What She's Like" was one of a few highlights of a show derailed by Rowland's ill-tempered demeanour. It was next performed live by Dexys Midnight Runners in 2003. Dave Simpson's Guardian review described how a version of the song lasting nearly twenty minutes received a standing ovation. A positive review of a show by Gavin Martin in The Independent mentioned that "This Is What She's Like" received the best reaction from the crowd of any song in the set.

After a further nine-year break from touring, the band included the song in shows in 2012. Simon Price of The Independent described an encore performance at the Shepherd's Bush Empire as "utterly astonishing" and that when Rowlands asks during the song whether he can express himself, his "outburst of ecstatic laa-laa-laas says more than words ever could." In another review the following year, Price noted that Rowland was performing the song with Pete Williams as co-vocalist, and they were "walk-dancing" in the style of Flanagan and Allen during the performance. The song was included in the band's set at Latitude in 2012. Band member Jim Paterson said in 2014 that live versions were sometimes as long as 22 minutes.

== Credits and personnel ==
Credits as per the inner sleeve of the original album release.

Musicians

- Kevin Rowland – vocals
- Billy Adams – lead guitar, rhythm guitar, vocals
- Helen O'Hara – violin, backing vocals
- Nicky Gatfield – saxophone, backing vocals
- Vincent Crane – piano
- Tim Dancy – drums
- Julian Littman – mandolin
- Jimmy Paterson – trombone
- Tommy Evans – steel guitar
- Robert Noble – organ, synthesizer
- John Edwards – bass

Technical

- Alan Winstanley, Kevin Rowland – producers
- Alan Winstanley – recording
- Pete Schwier – mixing
- Arun Chakraverty – mastering

== Releases ==
=== Albums ===
- Don't Stand Me Down (1985)
- The Very Best of Dexys Midnight Runners (1991); according to journalist Daryl Easlea, the album sought to position Dexys as a "hit singles band" and the song was "tagged on somewhat begrudgingly at the end."
- Because of You (1993)
- Don't Stand Me Down (1997) – re-release on Creation Records, with two extra tracks. Rowland complained in 2002 that "The '97 reissue on Creation was fucked up by the use of a 'stereo enhancer' during mastering – it sounded washy. It cheapened everything."
- Don't Stand Me Down: The Director's Cut (2002) Remastered re-release by EMI, with additional tracks.
- Let's Make This Precious: The Best of Dexys Midnight Runners

=== Video ===
- It Was Like This – Live (2004). DVD. Filmed in 2003.

=== Singles ===
Various edits were released.

Single releases for "This Is What She's Like" (November 1985)
| A-side / B-sides | Format | Label | Catalogue number | Notes |
|---|---|---|---|---|
| "An Extract from This Is What She's Like" / "This Is What She's Like Finale" | 7-inch single | Mercury Records | DEXYS 13 | UK |
| Disc 1: "An Extract from This Is What She's Like" / "This Is What She's Like Finale"; Disc 2: "Marguerita Time" / "Reminisce (Part 2)" | 7-inch single | Mercury Records | DEXYD | UK Gatefold double single |
| "This Is What She's Like" (DJ edit – short version) / "This Is What She's Like" (DJ edit – 7-inch single) | 7-inch single | Mercury Records | DEXDJ 13 | UK radio promo |
| "This Is What She's Like" / "Marguerita Time" | 10-inch single | Mercury Records | DEXYS 13-10 | UK |
| "This Is What She's Like"/ "This Is What She's Like (Instrumental)" / "Marguerita Time" | 12-inch single | Mercury Records | DEXYS 13-12 | UK |
| "This Is What She's Like (edit)"/ "This Is What She's Like" / "One of Those Things" | | Mercury Records | PRO-387-1 | US promo |

=== Weekly charts ===
Original release
| Chart (1985) | Peak position | Ref. |
|---|---|---|
| UK Singles (OCC) | 78 | |

== Bibliography ==
- White, Richard (2005). Dexys Midnight Runners: Young Soul Rebels. London: Omnibus. ISBN 1844498638.
