= The Feminine Divine =

Studio album by Dexys
- Released: 28 July 2023
- Studio: Famous Times, Hackney, London and others
- Length: 39:37
- Label: 100%
- Producer: Pete Schwier; Toby Chapman

Dexys chronology
Let the Record Show: Dexys Do Irish and Country Soul (2016)	The Feminine Divine (2023)	The Feminine Divine + Dexys Classics: Live! (2024)

The Feminine Divine is the sixth studio album by the English band Dexys, released on 28 July 2023 by 100% Records. The tracks were written by Kevin Rowland, Sean Read, Mike Timothy and Jim Paterson, and the album was produced by Pete Schwier and Toby Chapman. It was the group's first album of original songs since One Day I'm Going to Soar (2012) and their first album in seven years since Let the Record Show (2016). It is a concept album themed around Rowland's progress across three decades from being sexist to becoming a champion for women.

The album's lead single, "I'm Going to Get Free", was released on 3 April 2023. An accompanying promotional video, featuring Rowland dancing along Bethnal Green Road, was directed by Guy Myhill. The song was originally written by Rowland and Paterson in the early 1990s. The album track "It's Alright Kevin (Manhood 2023)" is a reworking of "Manhood", a song that Rowland performed on television in 1993 and later recorded for Let's Make This Precious: The Best of Dexys Midnight Runners (2003).

Critics gave the album a generally positive reception and noted that the second half of the album, featuring synthesisers, was unlike anything that the band had previously released. The track "My Submission" was highlighted with praise by several reviewers. The album entered the UK Albums Chart at number 6, making it the band's highest-charting album in over 30 years.

== Background and recording ==
The tracks were written by Kevin Rowland, Sean Read, Mike Timothy and Jim Paterson, and the album was produced by Pete Schwier and Toby Chapman. Following the release of Let the Record Show: Dexys Do Irish and Country Soul by Dexys in 2016, the band's frontman Rowland lacked ideas for new music for at least three years. In 2021, however, he started writing and producing demos for songs that he had composed with Read, Timothy and Paterson. The following year, studio recordings were made in venues including Read's Famous Times studio in Hackney, London, Chapman's studio in Catford, and Timothy's studio in Willesden. Both actual and synthesized instruments were used. After tensions between Rowland and Chapman threatened to derail the sessions, Pete Schwier, who had previously co-produced Dexys recordings, was engaged to work with the group and Chapman, and work on the album was completed. The track "It's Alright Kevin (Manhood 2023)" is a reworking of "Manhood", a song that Rowland performed on television in 1993 and later recorded for Let's Make This Precious: The Best of Dexys Midnight Runners (2003).

Official press materials to publicise the album described it as "a personal, if not strictly autobiographical, record portraying a man whose views have evolved over time. Not just on women, but the whole concept of masculinity he had been raised with." Helen Barrett of The Daily Telegraph summarised the concept as Rowland's "30-year progress from a sexist male who saw women as possessions to be protected ... to an enlightened champion of women."

Rowland told Harriet Gibsone of The Guardian that a trip to Thailand, where he learnt about Tao, had been significant for him: "Through Tao, I learned about the concept of women as goddesses. I realised that women are powerful. Until then, I'd never really tried to understand them. That's quite an incredible admission, really." Rowland explained that the first five songs of the album have a narrative where the narrator expresses different attitudes towards a relationship. in the fifth song, the title track, "he examines his relationships with women, and he sees that he's been sadly lacking". The remaining tracks concern a new relationship after this insight.

The album's cover art features an illustration inspired by Pele, the Hawaiian goddess of volcanoes and fire. The duration is 39 minutes and 37 seconds.

== Release and promotion ==
The album's lead single, "I'm Going to Get Free", was released on 3 April 2023. An accompanying promotional video, featuring Rowland dancing along Bethnal Green Road, was directed by Guy Myhill. The song was originally written by Rowland and Paterson in the early 1990s.

The Feminine Divine was released on 28 July 2023 by 100% Records. It was the group's first album of original songs since One Day I'm Going to Soar in 2012 and their first album in seven years since Let the Record Show in 2016. The album entered the UK Official Albums Chart at number 6, making it the band's highest-charting album in over 30 years.

A supporting tour of theatre venues, was organised, with the band playing the entire album live, followed by several older songs. Rowland told Tina Benitez-Eves of American Songwriter that the group would "theatrically perform the songs — act them out". A North American tour was planned for November 2023 but subsequently cancelled. A live album from the tour, The Feminine Divine + Dexys Classics: Live! was released in May 2024. The band did not perform any tracks from the album when they appeared at the Glastonbury Festival 2024.

== Critical reception ==
Professional ratings
Aggregate scores
Source	Rating
Metacritic	77/100
Review scores
Source	Rating
AllMusic	3.5/5 stars
The Line of Best Fit	6/10
Record Collector	4/5 stars
Mojo	3/5 stars
The Guardian	4/5 stars
RetroPop	3/5 stars

The Feminine Divine received a score of 77 out of 100 on review aggregator Metacritic based on four critics' reviews, indicating "generally favorable" reception. Uncut felt that the sound "confidently flits between low-key funk, lush symphonic Philly soul and the more punchy post-Motown dance grooves of Chairmen of the Board" and praised "Rowland's powerfully assured vocal delivery of his mea culpa confessionals". Simon Heavisides of The Line of Best Fit concluded that the album was not on the same level as the first three Dexys Midnight Runners albums and was slightly inferior to One Day I'm Going to Soar, but added that "there's enough of their unique brilliance on display to make this a qualified victory".

Record Collector's Shaun Curran wrote that the first half, "full of blaring brass, soul-inflections, [and] Rowland's histrionic vocals" was recognisably the sound of Dexys, calling the second half "a striking electronic makeover". He added that "if the premise is laid on a bit thick – Rowland never does things by halves – at least torch song My Submission is the most beautiful thing Dexys have ever done". Similarly, Mojo's David Hutcheon wrote that the second half – which he described as "a saucy, synth-heavy cabaret" – would be unpopular with listeners, but felt that "Rowland still manages to pull a gem out of the fire with the touching 'My Submission'". The song was also highlighted by Graeme Thomson in The Spectator, who said that it "hits the kind of grace notes the rest of the record largely lacks".

Alexis Petridis of The Guardian gave the album four out of five stars and described it as "at turns discomfiting, brave, baffling and hugely impressive ... the kind of album that no one would countenance making except Rowland". He argued that a change in direction for was what fans would expect from the band and remarked that "you might decry [the lyrics for the title track] as painfully earnest and on the nose were it not for the fact that complaining about painful earnestness on a Dexys album feels a bit like complaining that a sandwich shop has just sold you a sandwich."

== Track listing ==
No.	Title	Writer(s)	Length
1.	"The One That Loves You"	Kevin Rowland, Jim Paterson	4:33
2.	"It's Alright Kevin (Manhood 2023)"	Rowland, Paterson	5:02
3.	"I'm Going to Get Free"	Rowland	3:26
4.	"Coming Home"	Rowland, Paterson	3:29
5.	"The Feminine Divine"	Rowland, Sean Read	4:36
6.	"My Goddess Is"	Rowland, Michael Timothy	3:29
7.	"Goddess Rules"	Rowland, Timothy, Kamaria Castang	3:23
8.	"My Submission"	Rowland, Read	6:15
9.	"Dance with Me"	Rowland, Timothy	5:24

== Personnel ==
- Kevin Rowland — vocals
- Kim Chandler — vocals (track 2, 3)
- Maddy Reade Clarke — vocals (track 5)
- Kamaria Castang — vocals (track 7)
- Jim Paterson — trombone (tracks 1, 3)
- Sean Read — saxophone (tracks 1, 3), vocals (tracks 2–6), Hammond organ (track 3), keyboards (track 8), programming (track 8)
- Toby Chapman — programming; keyboards (tracks 1–5, 8, 9), bass (tracks 1–5, 8), guitar (tracks 1–5), vocals (tracks 1, 4, 6, 9)
- Mike Timothy — keyboards (tracks 6, 7, 9), programming (tracks 6, 7, 9), vocals (track 6)

== Charts ==
Chart performance for The Feminine Divine
Chart (2023)	Peak position
German Albums (Offizielle Top 100)	100
Irish Albums (IRMA)	60
Scottish Albums (OCC)	4
UK Albums (OCC)	6
UK Independent Albums (OCC)	1

== Tour dates ==
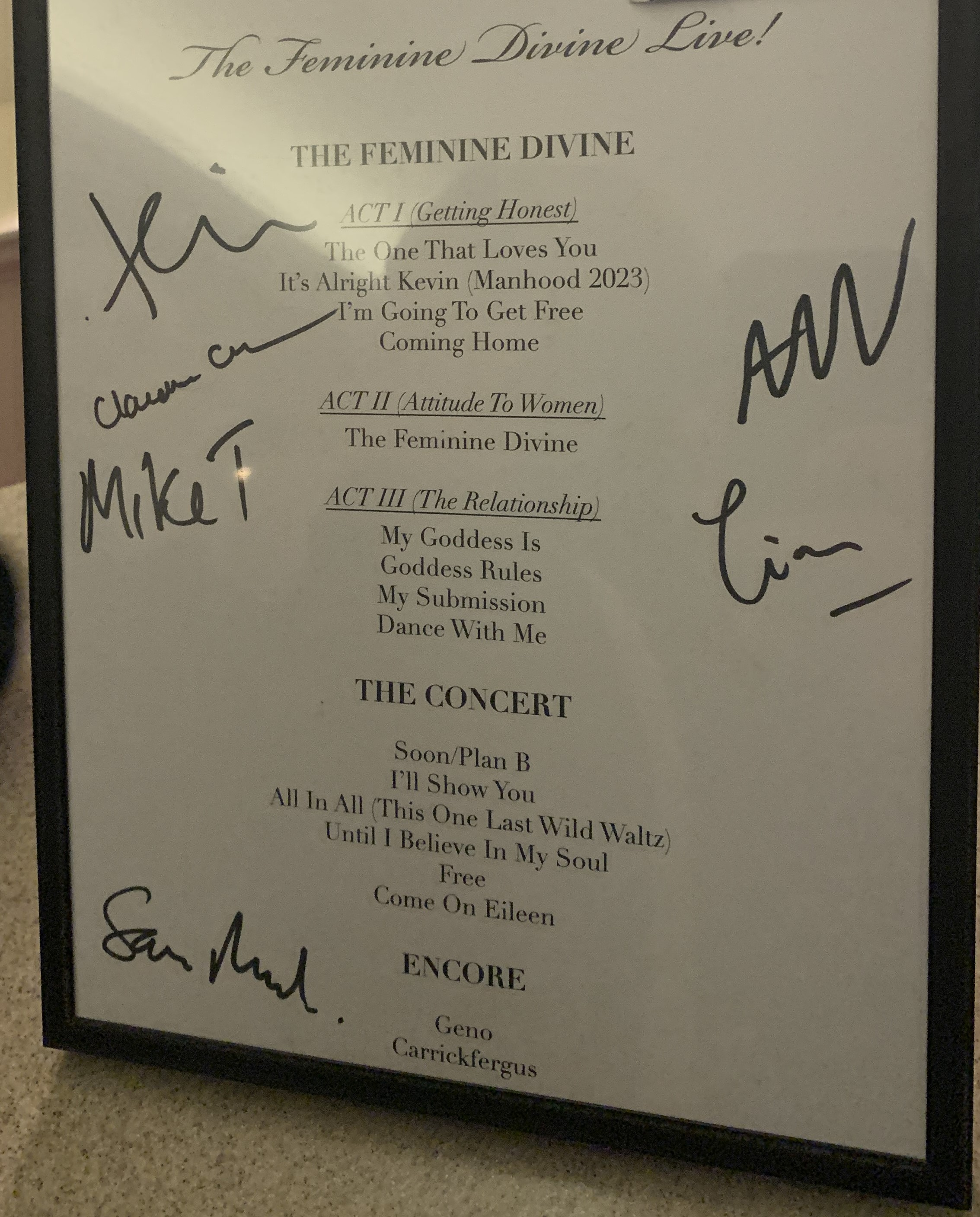
Set list for the Dexys concert at the London Palladium, 20 September 2023

The Feminine Divine Live 2023 Tour dates
Date	Venue	Notes
5 September	York Barbican	
7 September	Philharmonic Hall, Liverpool	
8 September	Bridgewater Hall, Manchester	
10 September	O2 City Hall, Newcastle	
11 September	Glasgow Royal Concert Hall	
13 September	St David's Hall, Cardiff	Cancelled (Note: The venue was closed temporarily due to concerns about reinforced autoclaved aerated concrete.)
14 September	Regent Theatre, Ipswich	
16 September	Wolverhampton Civic Hall	
17 September	Cliffs Pavilion, Southend-on-Sea	
19 September	Brighton Dome	
20 September	London Palladium	
22 September	The Forum, Bath (early show)	
22 September	The Forum, Bath (late show)	
25 September	Olympia Theatre, Dublin	
1 October	De Roma, Borgerhout	
2 October	Muffathalle, Munich	
4 October	Admiralspalast, Berlin	
5 October	Kampnagel, Hamburg	
7 October	Katalin, Uppsala	
10 October	Maihaugsalen, Lillehammer	
12 October	Konzerthaus Dortmund	
13 October	Paradiso Noord, Tolhuistuin, Amsterdam	
15 October	Kulturzentrum Opderschmelz, Dudelange	
16 October	La Cigale, Paris	
18 October	Teatro Barceló, Madrid	
20 October	Casino Estoril	
26 October	The Theatre at Ace Hotel, Los Angeles	Cancelled
27 October	Palace of Fine Arts, San Francisco	Cancelled
29 October	Aladdin Theater, Portland	Cancelled
30 October	Vogue Theatre, Vancouver	Cancelled
1 November	The Union, Salt Lake City	Cancelled
2 November	Paramount Theatre, Denver	Cancelled
4 November	Palace Theatre, Saint Paul	Cancelled
6 November	The Vic Theatre, Chicago	Cancelled
8 November	Queen Elizabeth Theatre, Toronto	Cancelled
10 November	Patchogue Theatre for the Performing Arts	Cancelled
11 November	Emerson Colonial Theatre, Boston	Cancelled
13 November	The Town Hall, New York	Cancelled
14 November	College Street Music Hall, New Haven	Cancelled
15 November	Keswick Theatre, Glenside	Cancelled
