= Love (Dexys Midnight Runners album) =

Studio album by Dexys Midnight Runners
- Released: 4 September 2026
- Length: 45:27
- Label: Heavenly
- Producer: David Holmes

Dexys Midnight Runners chronology
| The Feminine Devine + Dexys Classics: Live! (2024) | Love (2026) |

Singles from Love
- 1. "My Life in England Pt. 1" Released: 20 May 2026; 2. "You've Got the Love" Released: 29 July 2026; 3. "Once a Man, Twice a Child" Released: 2 September 2026

Love is the seventh studio album by the English pop group Dexys Midnight Runners, released on 4 September 2026 on Heavenly Recordings. Produced by Belfast DJ and musician David Holmes, it is the fourth album under the name Dexys Midnight Runners, and is reportedly the first album from the final chapter of the band.

== Background, release and promotion ==
On Love, the group's frontman Kevin Rowland included stories "from his 2nd generation Irish childhood and family relationships to late-life romance, loss and reconciliation". The album's first single is "My Life in England Pt. 1", released on 20 May 2026, and is also a re-recording of a song from 2003, originally from the compilation Let's Make This Precious: The Best of Dexys Midnight Runners. Rowland said of the re-recording: "We put out a version of this song on a compilation album in 2003, but I felt we could improve on it."

The album's second single is "You've Got the Love", released on 29 July. Rowland said of how the song was written: "When we started writing, I went to Mike [Timothy], and said: have you got any ideas? And he sent me some, and I picked out two or three, which ended up on the album, and this was one of them. It was really simple. I was seeing a woman at the time, and I wrote the lyric, and Mike and I messed around until we were happy with it. The woman is not in my life anymore, so I’ve never told her I wrote it. I suppose I should. It might be nice for her to know." The album will be supported by an intimate, in-shops tour, where the group will perform in music shops and fans can have their records signed by the group.

The third single was released on 2 September, accompanied by a video: "Once a Man, Twice a Child". It tells the story of days spent loving one of the people Kevin never thought he could get closer to: his father. Talking about the track, Kevin Rowland shares: "I had a really tough relationship with my dad, my old man. I was resigned to the fact that we were never going to be close. He was close to other relatives, some of my siblings, but we just always clashed. I still loved him. He then had a stroke, and he completely softened up, and I found I could hug him and be loving. Which I never could before. It was incredible. Before he had that stroke, he was a tough man, one of the toughest of his generation. Occasionally he would come and stay a couple of nights with me after his stroke, and I'd put him to bed and all of that. 'I helped you button up your shirt, I kissed your head before you slept.' That wouldn't have happened earlier. None of that. It was lovely, really, I would hold his hand, we'd go for walks. A friend came around and I said, 'It's amazing, you have this incredible relationship with your dad now, and I know it's an awful thing when somebody has a stroke, but I'm glad I got that time with him.' As they say, once a man, twice a child."

== Critical reception ==
Professional ratings
Aggregate scores
| Source | Rating |
|---|---|
| Any Decent Music | 7.7/10 |
| Metacritic | 88/100 |
Review scores
| Source | Rating |
| AllMusic | 4.5/5 stars |
| The Arts Desk | 2/5 stars |
| The Line of Best Fit | 8/10 |
| Mojo | 4/4 stars |
| PopMatters | 8/10 |
| Record Collector | 5/5 stars |

Any Decent Music gave the album a weighted average score of 7.7 out of 10 from nine critic scores. According to Metacritic, the album received "universal acclaim" based on a weighted average score of 88 out of 100 from six critic scores.

== Track listing ==
All lyrics are written by Kevin Rowland, except "Strange Feelin'" (by Tim Buckley).

Love track listing
| No. | Title | Music | Length |
|---|---|---|---|
| 1. | "My Life in England Pt. 1" | Kevin Rowland; Big Jim Paterson; David Ditchfield; David Holmes | 5:06 |
| 2. | "You've Got the Love" | Rowland; Michael Timothy; Holmes | 3:04 |
| 3. | "Once a Man and Twice a Child" | Rowland; Sean Read; Holmes | 3:46 |
| 4. | "You're Alright" | Rowland; Timothy; Holmes | 4:18 |
| 5. | "I Want to Be Holding You Next Christmas" | Rowland; Paterson; Holmes | 5:42 |
| 6. | "I'll Always Love You" | Rowland; Timothy; Holmes | 4:07 |
| 7. | "Strange Feelin'" | Tim Buckley | 5:29 |
| 8. | "It's Over Now" | Rowland; Read; Holmes | 3:47 |
| 9. | "Old Love" | Rowland; Read; Holmes | 4:13 |
| 10. | "My Life in England Pt. 2" | Rowland; Paterson; Ditchfield; Holmes | 5:55 |
| Total length: | | | 45:27 |

== Personnel ==
Credits are adapted from Tidal.

=== Dexys Midnight Runners ===
- Sean Read – percussion (tracks 1, 2, 5, 10), vocal engineering (1, 3, 5, 7–10), keyboards (1, 5, 8, 10), background vocals (1, 10), piano (3)
- Kevin Rowland – lead vocals
- Michael Timothy – keyboards (1, 2, 6), piano (1, 2, 4, 9, 10), vocal engineering (2, 4, 6)

=== Additional contributors ===
- David Holmes – production
- Michael Harris – engineering
- Peter Schwier – mixing
- Tony Cousins – mastering
- Sam Dixon – bass guitar
- Jay Bellerose – drums
- Brian Irvine – synthesizer (1, 3, 10), organ (1, 4, 8), conducting (2, 5, 6), piano (3, 8), guitar (7)
- Cian Nugent – guitar (1, 2, 4–7, 10)
- Beatrice Howard – background vocals (2, 4, 5, 7, 8)
- Sasha Buettner – viola (2, 5, 6)
- Alan McClure – violin (2, 5, 6)
- Niamh McGowan – violin (2, 5, 6)
- Rebecca Freckleton – background vocals (2, 8)

== Charts ==
Chart performance for Love
| Chart (2026) | Peak position |
|---|---|
| French Physical Albums (SNEP) | 169 |
| French Rock & Metal Albums (SNEP) | 69 |
| Irish Independent Albums (IRMA) | 15 |
| Scottish Albums (Official Charts) | 8 |
| UK Albums (Official Charts) | 20 |
| UK Independent Albums (Official Charts) | 2 |
