= Nick Gatfield =

British music executive (born 1960)

Nick Gatfield is a British music industry executive, entrepreneur and investor. He is the founder of Twin Music Inc, providing angel investment for music and entrepreneurial talent and is co-founder and/or investor in a number of businesses including interactive video platform, Synchronized. Gatfield was previously chairman & CEO of Sony Music UK and has held president positions at EMI (North America and UK), Island Records UK and Polydor Records/PolyGram Music Publishing USA.

== Early life and education ==
Gatfield was born in 1960 in Surrey, England. He attended Churcher's College, the University of Surrey and the Royal Academy of Music.

== Career ==
Gatfield's music career began in 1979 when he replaced Neil Pyzer in a Farnborough / Aldershot jazz funk band called Crosswinds. In 1982 he joined Dexys Midnight Runners, playing saxophone and keyboards in support of the number one album Too-Rye-Ay and global hit single "Come On Eileen". After recording the follow-up album Don't Stand Me Down, Gatfield joined EMI in 1985 as an A&R manager and in-house producer, before being promoted to head of A&R in 1987 where he oversaw the signings of Radiohead and Blur. In 1992 he moved to Los Angeles to set up a new label within the PolyGram label group, Atlas Records, which merged into Polydor Records in 1994 under Gatfield. He also added the role of president, Polygram Music Publishing, shortly before the company was acquired by Seagram. In 2001, he was hired by Universal Music Group as president of Universal Island Records UK where he oversaw a complete revamp of the label through signings including Amy Winehouse, Keane, Busted and Sugababes. In 2008, EMI's new management under Terra Firma hired Gatfield as President New Music, North America and UK; artists signed during his leadership include Deadmau5, Swedish House Mafia, Tinie Tempah and Emeli Sandé. In 2011 he was appointed chairman and CEO of Sony Music UK. In 2015 he founded Twin Music Inc, investing in early stage music talent and music entrepreneurs. In October 2015, in partnership with the University of Westminster, Twin Music launched a music entrepreneur award. Also in 2015, Gatfield co-founded and invested in Synchronized, an interactive video platform. He has also invested in a number of tech start ups. In 2016, Gatfield founded Twin Xenomania Ltd. with producer/songwriter and Xenomania founder Brian Higgins.

== Film ==
Gatfield featured in Amy, the 2015 documentary of Amy Winehouse, directed by Asif Kapadia.

== Awards ==
Gatfield was awarded International Music Executive of the Year 2013 at Worldwide Radio Summit in Los Angeles. He was awarded Corporate Luminary Award in 1998 by the American Society of Young Musicians.
