= Too-Rye-Ay =

Studio album by Dexys Midnight Runners
- Released: 22 July 1982
- Recorded: December 1981 – March 1982
- Studios: Genetic, Streatley, Berkshire
- Genres: New wave; Celtic folk; pop; blue-eyed soul
- Length: 40:37
- Label: Mercury
- Producers: Kevin Rowland; Clive Langer; Alan Winstanley

Dexys Midnight Runners chronology
Searching for the Young Soul Rebels (1980)	Too-Rye-Ay (1982)	Don't Stand Me Down (1985)

Singles from Too-Rye-Ay
- 1. "The Celtic Soul Brothers" Released: March 1982; 2. "Come On Eileen" Released: 25 June 1982; 3. "Jackie Wilson Said (I'm in Heaven When You Smile)" Released: August 1982; 4. "The Celtic Soul Brothers" Released: March 1983 (re-release)

Professional ratings
Review scores
Source	Rating
AllMusic	5/5 stars
Blender	4/5 stars
Encyclopedia of Popular Music	4/5 stars
NME	8/10
Q	4/5 stars
Record Collector	4/5 stars
The Village Voice	B+

Too-Rye-Ay is the second studio album by English pop band Dexys Midnight Runners. It was released in July 1982 by Mercury Records. The album is best known for the hit single "Come On Eileen", which included the refrain that inspired the album's title. It was the band's most successful album, debuting at number two on the UK Albums Chart.

== Background ==
Shortly before recording this album, Dexys' bandleader Kevin Rowland had decided to add a violin section to the band's existing horn section, which had contributed strings (viola and cello) to the band's previous single, "Liars A to E". However, after violinists Helen O'Hara and Steve Brennan joined the band, the three members of the horn section, including Dexys' co-leader and album co-composer "Big" Jim Paterson, decided to leave Dexys and become an independent horn band (ultimately known as The TKO Horns). Rowland convinced them to stay with the band long enough to record the album and to perform in a kick-off concert debuting the album on BBC Radio One in June 1982.

All the songs on the album were rearranged to add strings, which caused Dexys to re-record the 1981 singles "Plan B", "Liars A to E", and "Soon". During the rearrangement process, "Soon" was revised into the opening section of "Plan B"; since both songs were written by Rowland and Paterson, the merged songs are credited on the album simply as "Plan B".

== Release ==
The album's "Come On Eileen" became a number one hit in both the UK and the US. Dexys Midnight Runners are best known as a one-hit wonder in the US ("Come On Eileen" was also the first US single release by Dexys), but in the UK, "Geno" had previously reached number one, and "Jackie Wilson Said (I'm in Heaven When You Smile)" and "The Celtic Soul Brothers" were also UK hits.

Before "Come On Eileen", Dexys' only North American single was the Northern Soul classic "Seven Days Too Long", which Dexys' previous label EMI America had released only in Canada (with "Geno" as the B-side). However, on the strength of "Come On Eileen", Too-Rye-Ay reached number 14 in the US. Dexys' success in US was not maintained; the best performer of the band's follow-up singles in the US was "The Celtic Soul Brothers", which peaked at number 86.

Different releases of Too-Rye-Ay featured different versions of "Come On Eileen". Certain editions of the album featured a version beginning with a solo fiddle playing the first line of the folk song "Believe Me, If All Those Endearing Young Charms" and ending with a simple fadeout (length: 4:12). This version of the song is the one featured on the single release. However, many other versions of the album omit this fiddle solo, beginning directly with the bassline (length 4:07). Other editions of the album (including many of the "re-releases") featured a version without the violin intro and including a tag of Kevin Rowland singing "Young Charms" at the end (length: approximately 4:32), while the digital version offered by Spotify and the 2002 US CD reissue includes both front and end "Young Charms" tags. (length: approximately 4:47, or 4:19 without the ending tag). In addition, the most common release of the album features "Come On Eileen" as the final track, while the original US release features the tune as the opening track on Side 2.

The album was re-released in 1996 on CD with eight bonus tracks. In 2000 an enhanced edition was released with the music videos for "Come On Eileen" and "Jackie Wilson Said" as bonus material. In 2002 a US edition with bonus tracks was released. Marking its 25th anniversary, a 2007 two-CD deluxe edition was released, which included the entire 14-song album kickoff performance on BBC Radio 1 that had previously been released (without "I'll Show You") as BBC Radio One Live in Concert.

In August 2022 the album was again re-released with three CDs with the bonus tracks from 1996 plus five more and a live show from 1982. The studio album was also remixed; thus, it is called Too-Rye-Ay 'As It Should Have Sounded.' Rowland said about the remixes, "The songs and performances are great, but I always felt the mixes could be better. It's my most successful album, but it doesn't sound as good as the others." It was also released on vinyl.

== Track listing ==
All tracks are written by Kevin Rowland and Jim Paterson, except where noted.

Side one
No.	Title	Writer(s)	Length
1.	"The Celtic Soul Brothers (More, Please, Thank You)"	Kevin Rowland; Jim Paterson; Mickey Billingham	3:07
2.	"Let's Make This Precious"		4:03
3.	"All in All (This One Last Wild Waltz)"		4:08
4.	"Jackie Wilson Said (I'm in Heaven When You Smile)"	Van Morrison	3:06
5.	"Old"		5:00

Side two
No.	Title	Writer(s)	Length
6.	"Plan B"		5:04
7.	"I'll Show You"		2:41
8.	"Liars A to E"	Rowland; Paterson; Steve Torch	4:10
9.	"Until I Believe in My Soul"		7:00
10.	"Come On Eileen"	Rowland; Paterson; Billy Adams	4:32

1996 CD release bonus tracks
No.	Title	Writer(s)	Length
11.	"The Celtic Soul Brothers" (US mix)	Rowland; Paterson; Billingham	3:05
12.	"Jackie Wilson Said (I'm in Heaven When You Smile)" (live)	Morrison	2:48
13.	"Come On Eileen" (live)	Rowland; Paterson; Adams	7:16
14.	"Marguerita Time" (B-side to "This Is What She's Like")	Francis Rossi; Bernie Frost	4:50
15.	"Respect" (live)	Otis Redding	7:45
16.	"Dubious" (B-side to "Come On Eileen")		2:38
17.	"Love Part Two" (B-side to "The Celtic Soul Brothers")	Rowland; Billingham	1:43
18.	"T.S.O.P." (B-side to "Jackie Wilson Said (I'm in Heaven When You Smile)" 12 inch)	Kenneth Gamble; Leon Huff	3:45

2002 US issue bonus tracks
No.	Title	Writer(s)	Length
11.	"Show Me" (non-album single)		3:24
12.	"Dubious" (B-side to "Come On Eileen")		2:50
13.	"TSOP (The Sound of Philadelphia)" (B-side to "Jackie Wilson Said (I'm in Heaven When You Smile)" 12 inch)	Gamble; Huff	3:42
14.	"Let's Get This Straight (From the Start)" (non-album single)	Rowland; Adams; Helen O'Hara	3:36
15.	"Reminisce Part One" (B-side to "The Celtic Soul Brothers" reissue)	Rowland	5:47

2007 deluxe edition bonus tracks (Disc one)
No.	Title	Writer(s)	Length
11.	"Love Part Two" (B-side to "The Celtic Soul Brothers")	Rowland; Billingham	1:43
12.	"Dubious" (B-side to "Come On Eileen")		2:50
13.	"T.S.O.P." (B-side to "Jackie Wilson Said (I'm in Heaven When You Smile)" 12 inch)	Kenneth Gamble; Leon Huff	3:45
14.	"Let's Get This Straight (From the Start)" (non-album single)	Rowland; Adams; O'Hara	3:36
15.	"Old" (Live at Shaftsbury Theatre, Londo)		4:55
16.	"Respect" (Live at Shaftsbury Theatre, London)	Redding	7:42
17.	"Let's Make This Precious" (original version)		3:42

2007 deluxe edition bonus tracks (Disc two
No.	Title	Writer(s)	Length
1.	"T.S.O.P." (BBC Radio 1 Live in Concert, Newcastle)	Gamble; Huff	4:15
2.	"Burn It Down" (BBC Radio 1 Live in Concert, Newcastle)	Rowland	4:01
3.	"Let's Make This Precious" (BBC Radio 1 Live in Concert, Newcastle)		4:05
4.	"Jackie Wilson Said (I'm in Heaven When You Smile)" (BBC Radio 1 Live in Concert, Newcastle)	Morrison	3:16
5.	"Come On Eileen" (BBC Radio 1 Live in Concert, Newcastle)	Rowland; Paterson; Adams	6:33
6.	"Soon" (BBC Radio 1 Live in Concert, Newcastle)		1:27
7.	"Plan B" (BBC Radio 1 Live in Concert, Newcastle)		4:05
8.	"Geno" (BBC Radio 1 Live in Concert, Newcastle)	Rowland; Kevin Archer	3:33
9.	"Respect" (BBC Radio 1 Live in Concert, Newcastle)	Redding	6:59
10.	"Old" (BBC Radio 1 Live in Concert, Newcastle)		4:27
11.	"The Celtic Soul Brothers (More, Please, Thank You)" (BBC Radio 1 Live in Concert, Newcastle)	Rowland; Paterson; Billingham	2:46
12.	"There There, My Dear" (BBC Radio 1 Live in Concert, Newcastle)	Rowland; Archer	4:55
13.	"Show Me" (BBC Radio 1 Live in Concert, Newcastle)		3:25
14.	"I'll Show You" (BBC Radio 1 Live in Concert, Newcastle)		3:03
15.	"Let's Make This Precious" (BBC Session with David Jensen)		3:41
16.	"Jackie Wilson Said (I'm In Heaven When You Smile)" (BBC Session with David Jensen)	Morrison	3:05
17.	"All in All (This One Last Wild Waltz)" (BBC Session with David Jensen)		3:52
18.	"Old" (BBC Session with David Jensen)		4:40
19.	"Reminisce Part One" (B-side to "The Celtic Soul Brothers" reissue)	Rowland	5:47

Notes

- There are several unlisted tracks on the album— "Old" includes a reprise of "Let's Make This Precious" at the end. The beginning of "Plan B" is actually the song "Soon", a version of which is the B-side to the "Show Me" single. "Come On Eileen" ends with an acapella rendition of an excerpt from "Believe Me, if All Those Endearing Young Charms", which is excised on the original US vinyl release.
- Original US pressings have "Come On Eileen" at the beginning of side two. Also, "Plan B" and "I'll Show You" are presented as a single track.
- The 2002 US CD reissue features the single version of "Come On Eileen" instead of the album version (which removes the fiddle intro).

== Charts ==
=== Weekly charts ===
Chart (1982–83)	Peak position
Australian Albums (Kent Music Report)	2
Canada Top Albums/CDs (RPM)	10
Dutch Albums (Album Top 100)	9
German Albums (Offizielle Top 100)	29
New Zealand Albums (RMNZ)	2
Norwegian Albums (VG-lista)	22
Swedish Albums (Sverigetopplistan)	22
UK Albums (Official Charts)	2
US Billboard 200	14

=== Year-end charts ===
Chart (1982)	Position
New Zealand Albums (RMNZ)	5

== Certifications and sales ==
Region	Certification	Certified units/sales
Australia (ARIA)	Platinum	50,000^{^}
New Zealand (RMNZ)	Platinum	15,000^{^}
^{^} Shipments figures based on certification alone.

== Personnel ==
The players

- Seb Shelton – drums
- Giorgio Kilkenny – bass, backing vocals
- Kevin "Billy" Adams – banjo, guitar, backing vocals
- Mickey Billingham – organ, piano, accordion, keyboards, backing vocals
- "Big" Jim Paterson – trombone
- Paul Speare – flute, saxophone, tin whistle
- Brian Maurice – saxophone
- Kevin Rowland – bass, guitar, piano, director, vocals; digital remastering (reissue)
- Steve Wynne – bass (not credited on some releases)

"The Emerald Express"

- Helen O'Hara – violin
- Steve Brennan – violin

Guest musicians
"The Sisters of Scarlet"

- Carol Kenyon – vocals
- Katie Kissoon – vocals
- Sam Brown – vocals

Directed by

- Clive Langer – director
- Alan Winstanley – director
- Martin Rushent – engineering and direction (uncredited)
- Peter Barrett – cover design
- Kim Knott – photography
- Andrew Ratcliffe – artwork, paintings
- Tim Chacksfield – project coordinator (reissue)
- ID – Enhanced CD design (reissue)
- Philip Lloyd-Smee – CD package design (reissue)
- Richard Smith – liner notes (1996 reissue)
