= Don't Stand Me Down =

Studio album by Dexys Midnight Runners
- Released: 13 September 1985
- Recorded: 1984–85
- Genres: New wave, blue-eyed soul
- Length: 46:28
- Label: Mercury
- Producers: Kevin Rowland; Alan Winstanley

Dexys Midnight Runners chronology
| Too-Rye-Ay (1982) | Don't Stand Me Down (1985) | One Day I'm Going to Soar (2012) |

Alternative cover
- The 2002 "Director's Cut" reissue

Singles from Don't Stand Me Down
- 1. "This Is What She's Like" Released: November 1985

Don't Stand Me Down is the third studio album by English pop band Dexys Midnight Runners, released in September 1985 by Mercury Records. The title of the album was inspired by a line in the album's song "The Waltz".

The album was released three years after their second album, the internationally successful Too-Rye-Ay. At the time, Dexys' lineup had been pared down from ten members to just four: vocalist/guitarist Kevin Rowland, guitarist Billy Adams, violinist Helen O'Hara, and saxophonist Nick Gatfield, the last of whom left the band after the recording sessions were completed. These four members are pictured on the original album cover in suits (and, for the men, ties), in what Rowland referred to as an "Ivy League" or "Brooks Brothers" look.

The album was a commercial failure upon release, and its rejection by both critics and the public resulted in the group's disbandment in 1987. The album was later described as a "neglected masterpiece" by Uncut, and was selected as one of the 1001 Albums You Must Hear Before You Die. In 2002, EMI and Rowland co-operated on a remastered "Director's Cut" edition of the album, which included an additional song added to the tracklist and expanded liner notes.

== Recording ==
Because the band's lineup had been reduced to a quartet by the time of the recording, a number of performers and session musicians filled the other roles during the lengthy recording sessions, including Vincent Crane (ex-Atomic Rooster) on piano, Julian Littman on mandolin, Tim Dancy (who had been Al Green's drummer) on drums, Tommy Evans on steel guitar, and former Dexys members "Big" Jim Paterson on trombone, John "Rhino" Edwards on bass, and Robert Noble on organ and synthesizer.

In an interview with HitQuarters, saxophonist Gatfield described the recording as a "long drawn out painful process". Gatfield, who did not play on Too-Rye-Ay, felt that the new album marked a telling and troubling shift from it, as unlike that record, which he claimed was made very inexpensively and "had an energy about it", Don't Stand Me Down cost a huge amount of money and, according to Gatfield, "felt uncomfortable and unnatural". Among the notable producers that Dexys had worked with but then fired during the making of this album were Jimmy Miller and Tom Dowd.

O'Hara expressed a different perspective in a newspaper interview accompanying the reissue of the album. O'Hara, who had been part of the Too-Rye-Ay band, said that "it became clear that Kevin wanted to experiment more musically" than the record company was comfortable with, and that, even before the album was released, "it was obvious that nobody was really going to promote it." To her, the best thing about Don't Stand Me Down was "that it got released at all", but the lack of commercial success was "quite hard to deal with, particularly for Kevin."

On the original issue, just Alan Winstanley and Rowland were credited as producers, but Adams and O'Hara were added as co-producers in 1997, when the CD was reissued on Creation Records; at the same time, the titles to two of the songs were changed.

== Reception ==
Professional ratings
Review scores
| Source | Rating |
|---|---|
| AllMusic | 4/5 stars |
| Encyclopedia of Popular Music | 4/5 stars |
| NME | 9/10 |
| Select | 5/5 |
| Uncut | 5/5 stars |

The album was a commercial failure upon release, in part due to frontman Kevin Rowland's refusal to do publicity for the album or to release a single from it. An edited version of "This Is What She's Like" was eventually released as a single, backed with part one of "Reminiscence", but the two-month delay from the album's release to its release led to the single missing the charts entirely.

Some reviewers were highly critical, with Trouser Press characterizing the release as "a torpid snore that denies entertainment on every level", although writing in the Melody Maker, Colin Irwin described it as "quite the most challenging, absorbing, moving, uplifting and ultimately triumphant album of the year". The album is now considered something of a lost treasure: it was featured in 1001 Albums You Must Hear Before You Die, published in 2006 by Universe, where it was referred to as "a towering achievement... a Pet Sounds for the 1980s". Writing for Uncut in 2007, Paul Moody called it a "neglected masterpiece".

Rowland remarked in 2008 that "I don't want to think about it too much because I want to think about what I'm doing now, but I remember coming out of the studio thinking, 'That's the best I can do.'" In 2008, Bob Stanley of The Guardian commented on the album's failure, noting that it "emerged in a far less adventurous era than the one Too-Rye-Ay was released into. New mavericks on the block such as the Smiths and the Jesus and Mary Chain were entirely ignored by Radio 1. The same happened to Dexys, though it was their own fault – no single was released from the album."

== Reissues ==
=== 1997 Creation CD ===
In the 1990s, Rowland purchased the rights to Don't Stand Me Down from Mercury and decided to license a digitally remastered CD reissue of the album to Creation Records, which was releasing his current material. The album was issued by Creation in 1997 (CRECD154), and the cover of the album was changed to a shot of just Rowland and Adams from the same photo sessions as the original cover. Rowland's new sleeve notes, entitled "Foreword to the Second Edition", discusses the changing of two of the song titles from the original release: "Knowledge of Beauty" became "My National Pride", and "Listen to This" became "I Love You (Listen to This)". "My National Pride" was the original title of the former song, but Rowland "didn't have the courage to title it that when it came around to the artwork." In addition, the writers of the Warren Zevon song "Werewolves of London" were given co-writing credit on "One of Those Things", which uses the Zevon song as a background theme. Finally, two extra tracks were added to the release: "Reminisce (Part One)", recorded in the spring of 1983 prior to Don't Stand Me Down (and released as the B-side to the reissue of "The Celtic Soul Brothers" that year), and a version of "The Way You Look Tonight".

=== 2002 Director's Cut ===
During the mastering process for the Creation release, a stereo enhancer was used, which both Rowland and original recording engineer Pete Schwier felt "ruined the dynamics." As a result, Rowland ultimately licensed the tracks to Dexys original label, EMI, to release a third and definitive version of the album in 2002, subtitled The Director's Cut. The tracks were again digitally remastered, but without the stereo enhancer, and the CD featured new artwork, further notes by Rowland, and the additional track "Kevin Rowland's 13th Time", but excluded both of the extra tracks on the Creation release. The cover photo was changed to a photo from a contemporaneous but different photo session of Rowland, Adams, and O'Hara strolling in a park wearing "preppy" clothes (which had been used as the back-cover photo on the Creation reissue). According to Rowland, the album now sounded to him "as it was intended to sound." According to Rowland, "Kevin Rowland's 13th Time" had originally been intended to be the opening song (with the introductory lyric "My name is Kevin Rowland, I'm the leader of the band" and, in a later verse, a "joke" of sorts, to "kick off the proceedings"), but was left off the original issue of the album due to his perception at the time of a "dodgy drum beat" at one point; it was restored for The Director's Cut.

Rowland penned two pages of notes relating to the track, as well as a new "foreword to The Director's Cut", while also including his sleeve notes from the Creation "Second Edition".

A limited-edition version of The Director's Cut had a DVD disc included, featuring videos for the songs "This Is What She's Like", "My National Pride", and "I Love You (Listen to This)", directed by Jack Hazan. Rowland penned another page of notes regarding the videos. The booklet shows, in a two-page spread, a photo from the video shoot, with Dexys as an eight-piece band, with Rowland, Adams, and O'Hara in the foreground. All three videos feature footage from this set. While "This Is What She's Like" includes footage of Rowland and Adams walking the streets of New York City, and "My National Pride" shows the band in pastoral scenes evocative of Ireland, "I Love You (Listen to This)" is shot entirely on this set, dark, with a single spotlight on Rowland, no other band member visible, just various angles on Rowland singing the verses and choruses—the majority of the song—until the final instrumental ride-out, when Billy Adams, Helen O'Hara, and the rest of the musicians are finally seen for a few seconds.

== Track listing ==
=== Original 1985 version ===
Side A

1. "The Occasional Flicker" (Kevin Rowland) – 5:49
2. "This Is What She's Like" (Billy Adams, Helen O'Hara, Kevin Rowland) – 12:23
3. "Knowledge of Beauty" (Helen O'Hara, Kevin Rowland, Steve Wynne) – 7:01

Side B

1. "One of Those Things" (Kevin Rowland) – 6:01
2. "Reminisce Part Two" (Kevin Rowland) – 3:31
3. "Listen to This" (Billy Adams, Kevin Rowland) – 3:19
4. "The Waltz" (Kevin Rowland, Steve Torch) – 8:21

=== 1997 Creation reissue ===
1. "The Occasional Flicker" (Kevin Rowland) – 5:51
2. "This Is What She's Like" (Billy Adams, Helen O'Hara, Kevin Rowland) – 12:23
3. "My National Pride" (Helen O'Hara, Kevin Rowland, Steve Wynne) – 7:01
4. "One Of Those Things" (Kevin Rowland) – 6:00
5. "Reminisce (Part 2)" (Kevin Rowland) – 3:23
6. "I Love You (Listen To This)" (Billy Adams, Kevin Rowland) – 3:19
7. "The Waltz" (Kevin Rowland, Steve Torch) – 8:27
8. "Reminisce (Part One)" (Kevin Rowland) – 5:50
9. "The Way You Look Tonight" (Jerome Kern, Dorothy Fields) – 2:17

=== The Director's Cut ===
1. "Kevin Rowland's 13th Time" (Billy Adams, Helen O'Hara, Kevin Rowland) – 5:05
2. "The Occasional Flicker" (Kevin Rowland) – 5:49
3. "This Is What She's Like" (Billy Adams, Helen O'Hara, Kevin Rowland) – 12:23
4. "My National Pride" (Helen O'Hara, Kevin Rowland, Steve Wynne) – 7:01
5. "One of Those Things" (LeRoy Marinell, Kevin Rowland, Waddy Wachtel, Warren Zevon) – 6:01
6. "Reminisce (Part Two)" (Kevin Rowland) – 3:31
7. "I Love You (Listen to This)" (Billy Adams, Kevin Rowland) – 3:19
8. "The Waltz" (Kevin Rowland, Steve Torch) – 8:21

== Release notes ==
- "One of Those Things" has a riff taken from Warren Zevon's "Werewolves of London". For the 1997 re-release, Rowland admitted in the liner notes that he had used the riff and consequently Zevon and his co-writers, LeRoy Marinell and Waddy Wachtel, were given writing credits on the song.
- "Reminisce (Part Two)" includes "I'll Say Forever My Love" (James Dean, William Weatherspoon, Stephen Bowden).

== Personnel ==
Dexys Midnight Runners

- Kevin Rowland — bass, rhythm guitar, piano, vocals, producer, liner notes
- Billy Adams — lead guitar, rhythm guitar, vocals, producer
- Helen O'Hara — violin, backing vocals, producer
- "Big" Jim Paterson — trombone
- Nick Gatfield — saxophone, backing vocals
- Vincent Crane — piano
- Tim Dancy — drums
- Julian Littman — mandolin
- Tommy Evans — steel guitar
- Bob Noble — organ, synthesizer
- John "Rhino" Edwards — bass
- Tyrone "Crusher" Green — drums on "Listen to This"
- Mick Bolton — piano on "The Waltz"
- Randy Taylor — bass on "Knowledge of Beauty"
- Woody Woodmansey — drums on "The Waltz"

Technical

- Alan Winstanley — producer
- Pete Schwier — engineer, mixing
- John Porter — mixing on "Kevin Rowland's 13th Time"
- Peter Barrett — cover design
- Kim Knott — photography
- Claire Mueller — photography
- Jack Hazan — director
- Arun Chakraverty — engineer (reissue)
- Nigel Reeve — project coordinator (reissue)
