= Let the Record Show: Dexys Do Irish and Country Soul =

Studio album by Dexys
- Released: 3 June 2016
- Recorded: The Premises Studios, London & Famous Times
- Genres: Celtic; Irish folk; country soul
- Length: 53:48
- Label: 100%
- Producers: Pete Schwier, Kevin Rowland, and Sean Read

Dexys chronology
One Day I'm Going to Soar (2012)	Let the Record Show: Dexys Do Irish and Country Soul (2016)	The Feminine Divine (2023)

Let the Record Show: Dexys Do Irish and Country Soul is a 2016 album by Dexys, the band formerly known as Dexys Midnight Runners. The album includes interpretations of Irish songs and other select compositions. It reached number 10 in the UK Albums Chart on 10 June 2016.

Kevin Rowland said about the album:

"We had the idea to do this album in 1984 or 1985. It was to be called Irish and was to feature songs like 'Carrickfergus', 'Curragh of Kildare' and 'Women of Ireland' – all of which are featured here. Dexys broke up not too long afterwards, so it didn't happen."

He added: "The album is called Dexys DO Irish and Country Soul: DO it, not BECOME it. We're not trying to be Irish, and we haven't used too many Celtic instruments on there. It's our sound. We're bringing our style to these songs."

Tim Sommer, writing in Observer, called it "the most surprising album of 2016" and an "amazing, subtle, powerful, visceral album that lays bare the soul, memories and losses of Kevin Rowland".

== Track listing ==
1. "Women of Ireland" (Peadar Ó Doirnín, Seán Ó Riada)
2. "To Love Somebody" (Barry Gibb, Robin Gibb)
3. "Smoke Gets in Your Eyes" (Jerome Kern, Louis Houzeau, Otto Harbach, Paul Ganne)
4. "Curragh of Kildare" (Traditional)
5. "I'll Take You Home Again, Kathleen" (Thomas P. Westendorf)
6. "You Wear It Well" (Martin Quittenton, Rod Stewart)
7. "Forty Shades of Green" (Johnny Cash)
8. "How Do I Live" (Diane Warren)
9. "Grazing in the Grass" (Harry Elston, Philemon Hou)
10. "The Town I Loved So Well" (Phil Coulter)
11. "Both Sides Now" (Joni Mitchell)
12. "Carrickfergus" (Traditional)

Bonus

1. "To Love Somebody" (solo vocal)
2. "Smoke Gets in Your Eyes" (solo vocal)
3. "Curragh of Kildare" (solo vocal)
4. "I'll Take You Home Again, Kathleen" (solo vocal)
5. "How Do I Live" (solo vocal)
6. "Grazing in the Grass" (solo vocal)
7. "The Town I Loved So Well" (solo vocal)
8. "Carrickfergus" (solo vocal)
9. "How Do I Live" (instrumental)
10. "Grazing in the Grass" (instrumental)
11. "Both Sides Now" (instrumental)

== Videos ==
The release of the album was accompanied by videos for "Both Sides Now", "Carrickfergus", "Curragh Of Kildare" and "Grazing In The Grass".

== Live ==
"Carrickfergus" was performed live on the 2023 Feminine Divine Tour, and "To Love Somebody" and "Grazing In The Grass" at the following year's festival tour.

== Personnel ==
Adapted from the album booklet.

- Kevin Rowland - vocals
- Sean Read - vocals, Hammond organ
- Mary Pearce - vocals
- Lucy Morgan - viola
- Helen O'Hara - violin
- Big Jimmy Paterson - trombone
- Matt Child - keyboards
- Michael Timothy - keyboards
- Tim Cansfield - guitar
- Dave Ruffy - drums
- C J Jones - drums
- Andy Hobson - bass guitar
- Ben Trigg - cello, string arrangements
- Tom Pigott-Smith - violin
- Alice Pratley - violin
- Kirsty Mangan - violin
- Graham Pike - chromatic harmonica
- Camilla Pay - harp
- Jody Linscott - percussion
- Gavin Fitzjohn - trumpet
- Kim Chandler - backing vocals
