= Come On Eileen =

1982 single by Dexys Midnight Runners

Single by Dexys Midnight Runners and the Emerald Express

from the album Too-Rye-Ay
- B-side: "Dubious"
- Released: 25 June 1982
- Recorded: 1982
- Genre: New wave; pop rock
- Length: 4:12 (album version); 3:28 (single version)
- Label: Mercury
- Songwriters: Kevin Rowland; Jim Paterson; Billy Adams
- Producers: Clive Langer; Alan Winstanley

Dexys Midnight Runners singles chronology
| "The Celtic Soul Brothers" (1982) | "Come On Eileen" (1982) | "Jackie Wilson Said (I'm in Heaven When You Smile)" (1982) |

Music video
- "Come On Eileen" on YouTube

"Come On Eileen" is a song by the English pop rock band Dexys Midnight Runners (Note: Credited to Dexys Midnight Runners and the Emerald Express) from their second studio album, Too-Rye-Ay (1982). A new wave and pop rock song, "Come On Eileen" was conceived during the band's experimentation with string-focused instruments like banjos and fiddles. It was written by band members Kevin Rowland, Jim Paterson, and Billy Adams, and was produced by Clive Langer and Alan Winstanley.

"Come On Eileen" was released as the second single from Too-Rye-Ay on 25 June 1982, through Mercury Records. It received positive reviews from critics upon its release, with many praising its composition; it is considered by journalists to be the Dexys Midnight Runners' breakout hit in the United States. A music video, directed by Julien Temple, was also released. The song is featured in the 2012 film The Perks of Being a Wallflower, and has been covered by the American singer-songwriter Sabrina Carpenter, the American ska punk band Save Ferris, and the American singer-songwriter Sara Evans with the country band King Calaway.

"Come On Eileen" has charted in several countries, including the United States, where it topped the Billboard Hot 100 and reached number 6 on the Mainstream Rock Airplay chart. The song also topped the UK singles chart and has been certified 3× Platinum by the British Phonographic Industry (BPI). It charted in other regions such as Ireland and multiple European countries. In New Zealand, it has been certified 6× Platinum with 180,000 units confirmed.

== Background and release ==
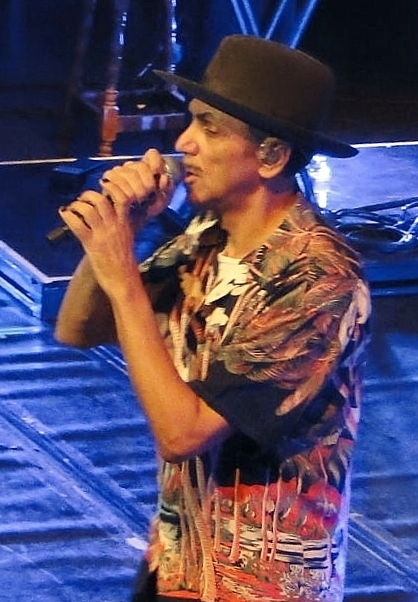
"Come On Eileen" was written by Kevin Rowland (pictured in 2012) along with Jim Paterson and Billy Adams.

Following the release of their debut studio album, Searching for the Young Soul Rebels (1980), Dexys Midnight Runners began recording their follow-up album, Too-Rye-Ay, in early 1982. They began experimenting with more string-focused instruments like banjos and fiddles, focusing less on electronic instruments such as synthesizers. During this process, the band developed "Come On Eileen", which was considered by Jim Beviglia, to be in the vein of "Billie Jean" (1983). It was written by Kevin Rowland, Jim Paterson, and Billy Adams, and was produced by Clive Langer and Alan Winstanley, with it being mastered by Arun Chakraverty.

Following the completion of Too-Rye-Ay in May 1982, "Come On Eileen" was released as the album's second single on 25 June, with "Dubious" as its B-side. In August that same year, Too-Rye-Ay was released through Mercury Records; "Come On Eileen" is sequenced as the final track on side two. A music video was also released alongside the single, and was directed by Julien Temple. The song appeared on the greatest hits albums The Very Best of Dexys Midnight Runners (1991), The Mercury Master Series (1996), and Let's Make This Precious: The Best of Dexys Midnight Runners (2003). Additionally, live recordings have appeared on the 1993 live album BBC Radio One Live in Concert, and The Feminine Divine + Dexys Classics: Live! (2024). It also appeared on the video album The Bridge (1982) and the DVD It Was Like This (2003). "Come On Eileen" is featured in the film The Perks of Being a Wallflower (2012), and has been covered by the American singer-songwriter Sabrina Carpenter, the American ska punk band Save Ferris, and the American singer-songwriter Sara Evans with the country band King Calaway.

== Composition and lyrics ==
"Come On Eileen" is a new wave and pop rock song, with a length of four minutes and 12 seconds. (Note: The single version includes a length of three minutes and 28 seconds) The song uses a standard 4/4 time signature and runs at a tempo of 104 beats per minute in common time, while set in the key of C major. Authors Michael Larson and David Luhrssen characterized "Come On Eileen" as having an "uplifting springtime feel" to it. The song opens with a "lazy, dreamy fiddle" according to the writer Brent Mann, before switching to a more pop-driven track. Instrumentally, the song contains fiddles and predominantly features Rowland singing "too-rye-aye".

When discussing the "Eileen" mentioned in the song, Rowland claimed Eileen was his adolescent lover: "For years I told everyone that Eileen was my childhood girlfriend". However, in a 2014 interview with The Guardian, he revealed that there was actually no real Eileen: "In fact she was composite, to make a point about Catholic repression." He referenced an interview he had during the group's 1981 Projected Passion Revue tour, and stated that the interviewer was "really good looking, and I was reminded of being a teenager, surrounded by Irish Catholic girls you couldn’t touch, but at the same time with these overpowering feelings of lust which you're not supposed to have."

== Critical reception ==
"Come On Eileen" has received positive reviews from critics since release, with it being considered a standout on Too-Rye-Ay. It has also been considered Dexys Midnight Runners' breakout hit in the United States. Larson and Luhrssen wrote that the song's melody was "irresistable", and wrote that it had an "infectious beat [that] stands a testament to the joys of young love's power to endure adversity", while Melanie Davis of American Songwriter considered "Come On Eileen" to be one of the catchiest songs to come out of the 1980s, writing that it was "among the earwormiest". AllMusic's Stewart Mason wrote that "Come On Eileen" was "armed with a cheerful and gay melodic hook", and went on to praise its chorus. Tim Sendra, also writing for AllMusic, deemed it as a "wild and wooly song" that encompasses everything Rowland wanted to do with the formation of Dexys Midnight Runners.

Terry Staunton of Record Collector stated that "Come On Eileen" "was one of the most original, uncompromising songs to top the singles chart", and Tom Breihan of Stereogum referred to it as "a fondly remembered piece of pop-music history". Mann claimed the song was "one of the most hum-able, gets-stuck-in-your-brain singles of the 80s". Rolling Stone included "Come On Eileen" in a list of the 200 Best Songs of the 1980s, listing it at number 164 and calling it a "celtsploitation banger". Also in 2023, the Billboard staff placed the song at number 172 out of 500 in a list of the Best Pop Songs of All Time, stating "The deliriously upbeat, fiddle-and-banjo fueled confession of thoughts that "verge on dirty," transforming an Irish folk tune into a pop-rock classic."

== Commercial performance ==
In the United States, "Come On Eileen" topped the Billboard Hot 100 and remains their best-performing song on that chart. It also reached number 1 on the Cash Box chart, and number 6 on the Mainstream Rock Airplay chart. In Canada, the song reached number 2 on the Canada Top Singles chart and has been certified gold by Music Canada. In the United Kingdom, "Come On Eileen" reached number 1 on the UK singles chart and was their second song to achieve that position, following "Geno" (1980). It also reached number 5 in France, number 1 in Ireland, and number 6 in West Germany. It has also been certified gold in Germany with over 300,000 confirmed units.

In the Netherlands, the song peaked at number 4 on the Dutch Top 40 and number 7 on the Dutch Single Top 100 respectively. In New Zealand, it reached number 1 and has been certified 6× Platinum by Recorded Music NZ. Elsewhere, "Come On Eileen" peaked at number 1 in Australia, Belgium, South Africa, and Switzerland. It also reached number 17 in Spain, number 9 in Austria. The song has been certified 3× Platinum by the British Phonographic Industry (BPI), and has additionally been certified gold in Australia and Denmark.

== Credits and personnel ==
Credits are adapted from the liner notes of Too-Rye-Ay.

=== Dexys Midnight Runners ===
- Seb Shelton – drums
- Giorgio Kilkenny – bass guitar
- Big Jimmy Paterson – trombone
- Mickey Billingham – organ and piano
- Paul Speare – tenor saxophone
- Billy Adams – guitar
- Brian Maurice – alto sax
- Kevin Rowland – vocals

=== The Emerald Express ===
- Helen O'Hara – violin
- Steve Brennan – violin

== Charts ==
=== Weekly charts ===
| Chart (1982–1983) | Peak position |
|---|---|
| Australia (Kent Music Report) | 1 |
| Austria (Ö3 Austria Top 40) | 9 |
| Belgium (Ultratop 50 Flanders) | 1 |
| Canada Top Singles (RPM) | 2 |
| France (IFOP) | 5 |
| Ireland (IRMA) | 1 |
| Netherlands (Dutch Top 40) | 4 |
| Netherlands (Single Top 100) | 7 |
| New Zealand (Recorded Music NZ) | 1 |
| South Africa (Springbok Radio) | 1 |
| Spain (AFYVE) | 17 |
| Switzerland (Schweizer Hitparade) | 1 |
| UK Singles (Official Charts) | 1 |
| US Billboard Hot 100 | 1 |
| US Mainstream Rock Airplay (Billboard) | 6 |
| US Cash Box Top 100 | 1 |
| West Germany (GfK) | 6 |

=== Year-end charts ===
| Chart (1982) | Position |
|---|---|
| Australia (Kent Music Report) | 12 |
| Belgium (Ultratop 50 Flanders) | 8 |
| Netherlands (Dutch Top 40) | 28 |
| Netherlands (Single Top 100) | 34 |
| New Zealand (RIANZ) | 5 |
| UK Singles (Official Charts) | 1 |

| Chart (1983) | Position |
|---|---|
| US Billboard Hot 100 | 13 |
| US Cash Box Top 100 | 12 |
| West Germany (Media Control) | 45 |

== Certifications and sales ==
| Region | Certification | Certified units/sales |
|---|---|---|
| Australia (ARIA) | Gold | 50,000^{^} |
| Canada (Music Canada) | Gold | 50,000^{^} |
| Denmark (IFPI Danmark) | Gold | 45,000^{‡} |
| Germany (BVMI) | Gold | 300,000^{‡} |
| New Zealand (RMNZ) | 6× Platinum | 180,000^{‡} |
| United Kingdom (BPI) | 3× Platinum | 1,800,000^{‡} |
^{^} Shipments figures based on certification alone.^{‡} Sales+streaming figures based on certification alone.
