= Let's Make This Precious: The Best of Dexys Midnight Runners =

Compilation album by Dexys Midnight Runners
- Released: 22 September 2003
- Recorded: 1979–1982; 1984–1986; 2003
- Genre: New wave/blue-eyed soul
- Label: EMI

Let's Make This Precious: The Best of Dexys Midnight Runners is a best-of compilation album by Dexys Midnight Runners, which also contained two newly recorded songs by the group, "Manhood" and "My Life in England (Part One)". Dexys had broken up in early 1987, and these two songs, recorded in 2003, were the first new Dexys material since the single "Because of You" in 1986. Nevertheless, the album was similar to the 1991 compilation The Very Best of Dexys Midnight Runners, as eleven of the sixteen older Dexys songs on it had also been included on that album ("Geno", "There, There My Dear", "The Celtic Soul Brothers", "Come On Eileen", "Jackie Wilson Said", "This Is What She's Like", "Let's Get This Straight (From the Start)", "Because Of You", "Show Me", "Breaking Down the Walls of Heartache", and "Plan B"). However, to record the two new songs, Rowland put together a new version of Dexys that featured prior members Pete Williams (bass and vocals) and Mick Talbot (keyboards) plus new members such as Lucy Morgan (viola) and Neil Hubbard (guitar), and the reformed band played a series of live concerts later in 2003.

For the live performances and concerts accompanying the reformation of Dexys, Rowland and the band adopted a look based on the 1947 film Brighton Rock. Dexys would perform "Manhood" on Top of the Pops in October, a month after the release of this album.

The album peaked at #75 in the U.K.

== Track listing ==
1. "Geno" (Kevin Rowland, Kevin 'Al' Archer)
2. "The Celtic Soul Brothers (More, Please, Thank You)" (Rowland, Jim Paterson, Mickey Billingham)
3. "Come On Eileen" (Rowland, Paterson, Kevin "Billy" Adams)
4. "Jackie Wilson Said (I'm in Heaven When You Smile)" (Van Morrison)
5. "Because of You" (Rowland, Adams, Helen O'Hara)
6. "Manhood" (Rowland, Paterson, David Ditchfield)
7. "Tell Me When My Light Turns Green" (Rowland)
8. "Breaking Down The Walls of Heartache" (Sandy Linzer, Denny Randell)
9. "There, There, My Dear" (Rowland, Archer)
10. "Plan B" (Rowland, Paterson)
11. "Show Me" (Rowland, Paterson)
12. "Let's Make This Precious" (BBC Version) (Rowland, Paterson)
13. Until I Believe In My Soul (BBC Version) (Rowland, Paterson)
14. "Let's Get This Straight (From The Start)" (Rowland, Adams, O'Hara)
15. "This Is What She's Like" (Rowland, Adams, O'Hara)
16. "My National Pride" (Rowland, O'Hara, Steve Wynne)
17. "I Love You (Listen to This)" (Rowland, Adams)
18. "My Life in England (Part One)" (Rowland, Paterson, Ditchfield)
