= Paul Speare =

British musician

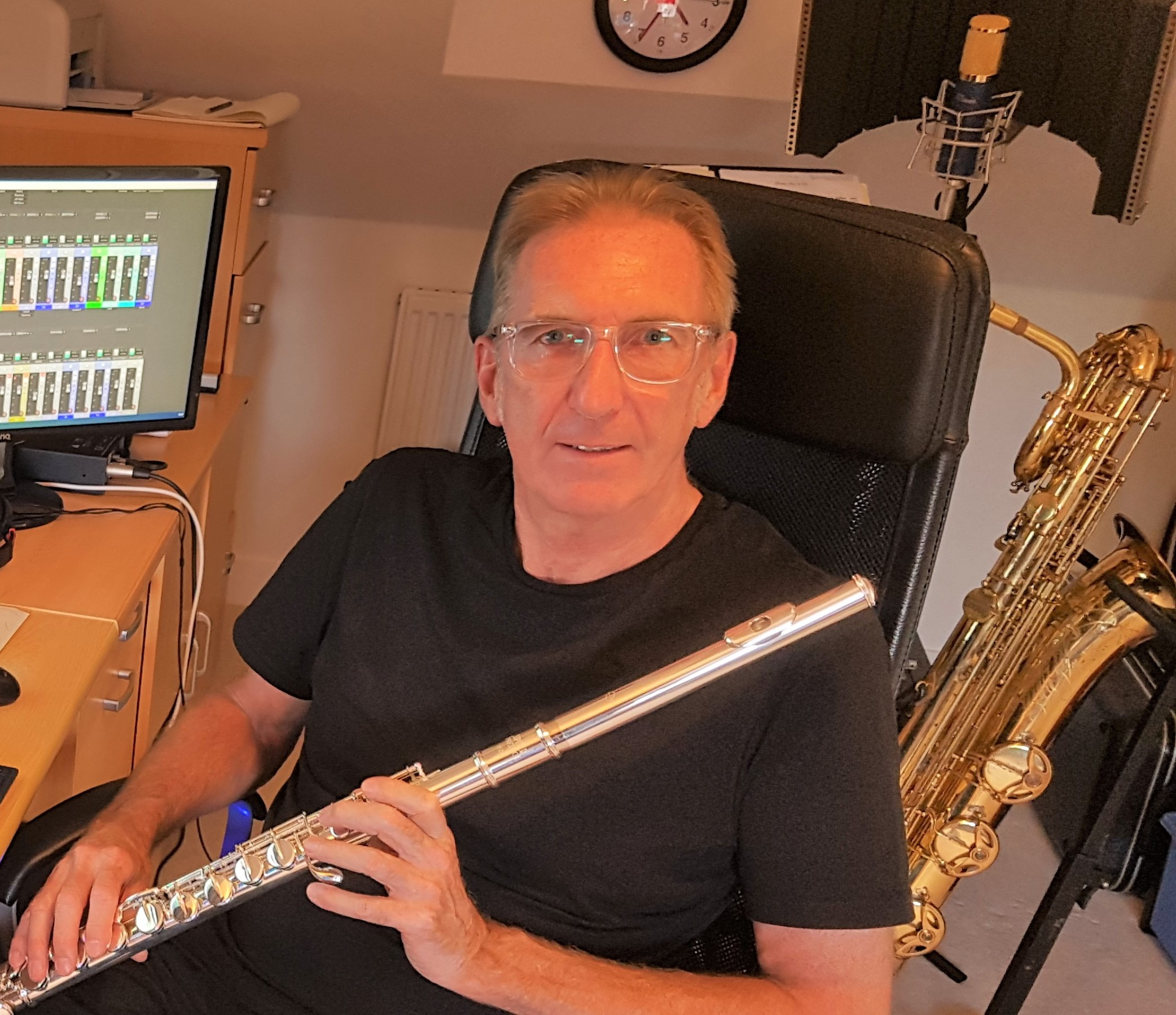
Paul Speare in 2020

Paul George Speare (born 10 December 1955) is an English composer, producer, freelance saxophonist and flute player, formerly a member of Dexys Midnight Runners and The TKO Horns.

He was born to Reginald and Julia Speare in Romford, Essex. He attended Dagenham County High School where he began playing drums, piano and viola when he was 15 years of age. At 16 he took up the flute, and tenor saxophone soon followed. He went on to study flute at the London College of Music and played saxophone in various pop and jazz bands during this time. Later, he moved to Birmingham and became heavily involved in the Midlands music scene for many years as a session musician, band leader and music producer.

Speare has played in many bands over the years, and from 1981-1982 was a full-time member of Dexys Midnight Runners. He later formed a horn section called The TKO Horns, along with Jim Paterson and Brian Maurice from Dexys. Another former Dexys saxophone player Geoff Blythe soon replaced Brian and Dave Plews was added on trumpet. The TKOs featured prominently on Elvis Costello's 1983 album Punch The Clock. It was during a recording session for Chris Difford and Glenn Tilbrook's album, Difford & Tilbrook, that he was unexpectedly asked by producer Tony Visconti to add a baritone saxophone part to "Actions Speak Faster". From that moment he discovered his love of the instrument and has specialised in it since. Speare later featured on the single "Nelson Mandela" by the Special AKA.

From the early 1990s, Speare was a music and media lecturer in a number of further education colleges until 2005. Since then he has worked as a freelance arranger, composer, session musician and producer.

He played baritone sax/flute on the tracks "More" and "Old Father Tyme" for the Paul Weller album "On Sunset" (2020). He featured on the Stone Foundation albums "Street Rituals" (2017) produced by Paul Weller, "Everybody, Anyone" (2018) and "Is Love Enough" (2020), on which he played baritone/tenor sax and flute. He also appeared on their live album/DVD Live Rituals (2017), recorded at the Islington Assembly Rooms, with Paul Weller as special guest.

Since 2010 Speare has contributed music to projects by the London painter and curator Harry Pye, both as a performer and composer. In 2020 he wrote and produced a soundtrack for the YouTube video "John Lennon Is Not Dead: Reality Leaves A Lot To The Imagination", by Harry Pye and Gordon Beswick, celebrating the 80th anniversary of John Lennon's birth for an exhibition at the Stash Gallery, London.

In 2022 Speare assembled a band of musicians to perform four of his original pieces live to video, released on his YouTube channel Paul Speare Music in March 2022, under the title "Time And Place". These were the first four of his compositions to feature himself as a lead player and written in a genre which fuses jazz, soul, classical and cinematic influences. The pieces reflect times and places which have been significant in his life. On 25 November 2022 he released his debut EP "Time And Place" which contained four further original compositions – two of them featuring the Kent vocalist Ginger Bennett - produced mainly at his own studio in Canterbury, England.

In January 2023 Speare's Time And Place band played its live debut at Pizza Express Live, Holborn, London. This included two new compositions which were the basis of his second EP "In Search of Avet", released on 25 July 2023 and again produced mainly at his own Canterbury studio. The title refers to an imaginary world without conflict where people dance to jazz-fusion music. Two of the pieces are songs featuring the vocals of Ginger Bennett and Hilary Cameron. Speare also returned to arranging for brass section on two of the pieces. This release was followed by a live performance at Herne Bay Jazz Festival on 20 August 2023. Speare continues to write new material for his own forthcoming music/video projects, and records flute and saxophone parts remotely for various productions.

== Dexys ==
In 1981, Speare joined Dexys Midnight Runners. He featured on the singles "Plan B", "Show Me", "Liars A to E", "Celtic Soul Brothers" and their worldwide hit "Come On Eileen". He also featured on their album Too-Rye-Ay.
