= Dexys Midnight Runners =

English pop rock band

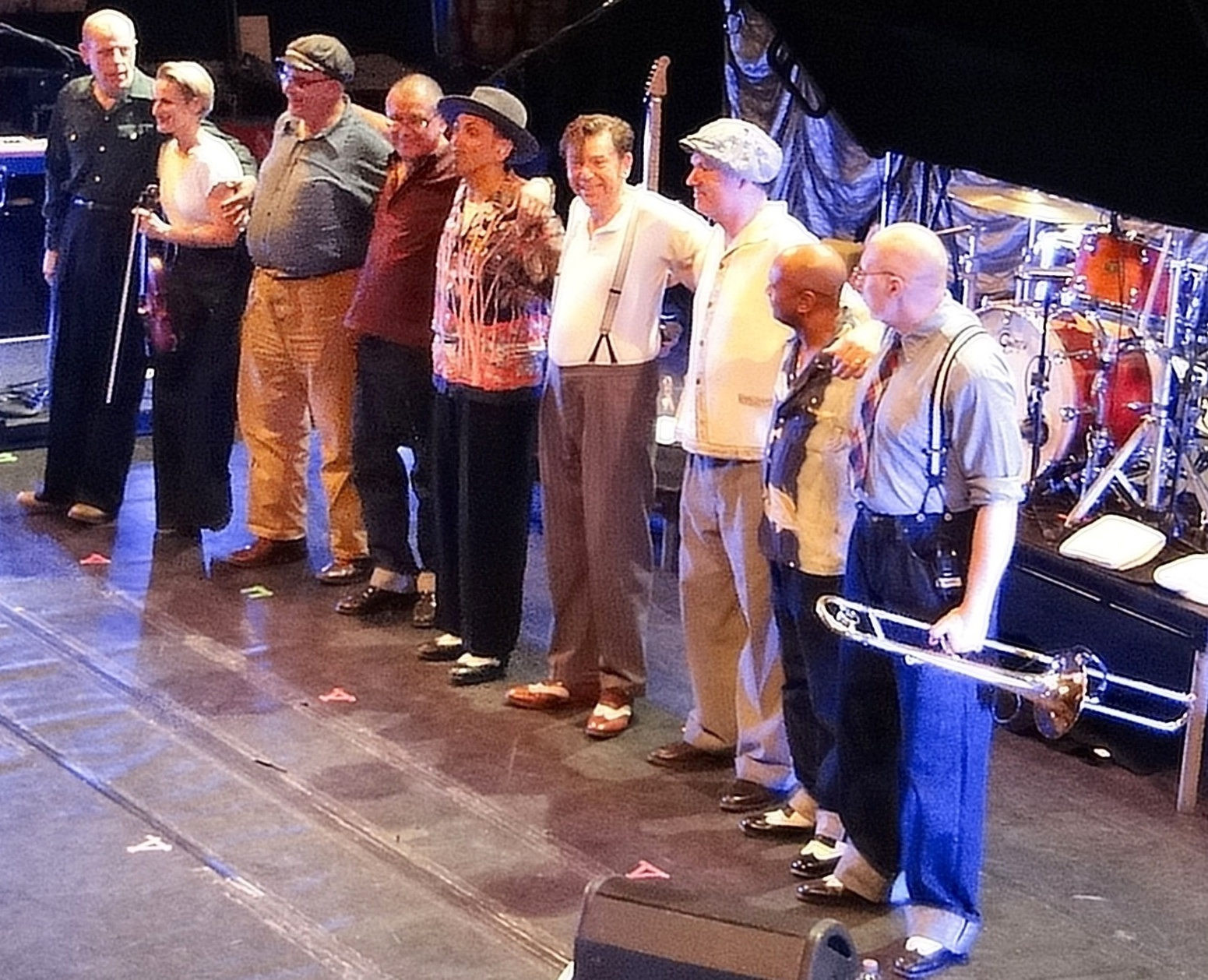
- Dexys at Cambridge Corn Exchange in 2012

Background information
- Also known as: Dexys; The Emerald Express
- Origin: Birmingham, England
- Genres: Pop rock; new wave; blue-eyed soul; Celtic folk
- Years active: 1978–1986; 2003–present
- Labels: Oddball; EMI; Mercury; BMG; Windsong; Absolute Dexys; 100%
- Members: Kevin Rowland; Jim Paterson; Sean Read; Michael Timothy; Lucy Morgan
- Past members: See members section
- Website: dexysofficial.com

Dexys Midnight Runners (known as simply Dexys from 2003 to 2026) are an English pop rock band from Birmingham. They are best known in the UK for their songs "Come On Eileen" and "Geno", both of which reached No. 1 on the UK Singles Chart, as well as their cover of Van Morrison's "Jackie Wilson Said (I'm in Heaven When You Smile)", which reached No. 5. They achieved five other UK top-20 singles. Outside of the UK, the band are largely considered a one hit wonder, with "Come On Eileen" also having topped the US Billboard Hot 100. With extensive airplay on MTV, they were associated with the Second British Invasion.

During the late 1970s and early 1980s, Dexys went through numerous personnel changes over the course of three albums and 13 singles, with only singer/songwriter/co-founder Kevin Rowland remaining in the band through all of the transitions; only he and trombonist "Big" Jim Paterson appeared on all studio albums. By 1985, the band consisted only of Rowland and long-standing members Helen O'Hara (violin) and Billy Adams (guitar). The band broke up the following year, and Rowland pursued a solo career for several decades.

After two failed restart attempts, the band was reformed by Rowland as Dexys in 2003 with new members, as well as a few returning members from the band's original lineup. Dexys released their fourth album, One Day I'm Going to Soar in 2012; a fifth, Let the Record Show: Dexys Do Irish and Country Soul, followed in 2016. The band later released their sixth album The Feminine Divine in 2023, and released their seventh album Love in September 2026 following a revert back to the original band name.

== History ==
=== Dexys Mark I: 1978–1980 ===
==== Foundation and first single ====
Dexys Midnight Runners were founded in 1978 in Birmingham, England, by Kevin Rowland (vocals, guitar, at the time using the pseudonym Carlo Rolan) and Kevin "Al" Archer (vocals, guitar). Both had been in the short-lived punk band the Killjoys. Rowland had previously written a Northern soul-style song that the two of them sang, "Tell Me When My Light Turns Green", which became the first Dexys "song". The band's name was derived from Dexedrine, a brand of dextroamphetamine used as a recreational drug among Northern soul fans to give them energy to dance all night. Rowland later said of recruiting members for the band that "Anyone joining Dexys had to give up their job and rehearse all day long ... We had nothing to lose and felt that what we were doing was everything." "Big" Jim Paterson (trombone), Geoff "JB" Blythe (saxophone, previously of Geno Washington's Ram Jam Band), Steve "Babyface" Spooner (alto saxophone), Pete Saunders (keyboard), Pete Williams (bass) and John Jay (drums) formed the first lineup of the band, which began playing live at the end of 1978.

By the middle of 1979, Bobby "Jnr" Ward had replaced Jay on drums. The Clash manager Bernard Rhodes then signed them and sent them into the studio to record a Rowland-penned single, "Burn It Down", which Rhodes renamed "Dance Stance". In response to Rhodes' criticism of Rowland's singing style, Rowland developed a "more emotional" sound influenced by General Norman Johnson of the Holland–Dozier–Holland band Chairmen of the Board and the theatricality of Bryan Ferry.

After a series of dates opening for the Specials, who wore suits on stage, Rowland decided that his band needed its own distinct look. Borrowing from an outfit that Paterson had worn to rehearsals, Dexys subsequently dressed in donkey jackets or leather coats and woolly hats, a look described as "straight out of De Niro's Mean Streets". In January 1980, Rowland said of the band's sound and look, "we didn't want to become part of anyone else's movement. We'd rather be our own movement". Image became very important to the group: Rowland said, "We wanted to be a group that looked like something ... a formed group, a project, not just random."

"Dance Stance", which Rhodes produced, was released on Oddball Records, which Rhodes owned, and which was distributed by EMI. Although it was named "single of the week" by Sounds, it stalled at number 40 in the British charts, which EMI and Rowland believed was due to Rhodes' poor production. Rowland said, "We learned that early on, that the wrong producer can totally screw your record up." As a result, Dexys fired Rhodes and signed with EMI, and EMI immediately put Pete Wingfield in charge of their production. Saunders and Ward left the band, replaced by Andy Leek (keyboards) and Andy "Stoker" Growcott (drums).

==== Searching for the Young Soul Rebels and first band split ====
Building on the unexpected success of "Dance Stance" (aka "Burn It Down"), Dexys' next single, "Geno" – about Geno Washington – became a British Number One in 1980. It featured the band's "Late Night Feelings" imprint on the single, which became a trademark of the band's records on EMI. Rowland wrote about Washington as he had seen one of his performances aged 11 with his brother. The success of the song prompted Washington to make a return to live performance, but it also prompted the departure of Leek, who said he didn't want to be famous. Pete Saunders returned to the band temporarily, replacing Leek, to record their debut album.

Dexys' debut LP, Searching for the Young Soul Rebels, which featured "Geno", was released in July 1980. The label of the album also included the band's "Late Night Feelings" imprint, and the album's sleeve featured a photograph of a Belfast Catholic boy carrying his belongings after moving from his home during the Troubles; the Irish-descended Rowland explained that "I wanted a picture of unrest. It could have been from anywhere but I was secretly glad that it was from Ireland." Of the album's title, Rowland said "I don't know ... I just liked the sound of it, really." Of the songs on the album, only two ("Geno" and "There, There, My Dear") were written by Rowland (lyrics) and Archer (music) together; producer Pete Wingfield hadn't liked Rowland's lyrics on their third co-composition ("Keep It") and had instead turned those lyrics into a separate song ("Love Part One"); Blythe wrote new lyrics for the version of "Keep It" on the album. The same month, Rowland imposed a press embargo on the band; instead, Dexys would take out ads in the music papers explaining the band's position on various issues. This was a response to some less than complimentary opinions from some music press writers; for example, the NME's Mark Cordery accused the band of "emotional fascism" and described their music as a perversion of soul music with "no tenderness, no sex, no wit, no laughter".

After the album, Saunders was replaced by Mick Talbot (ex-The Merton Parkas) on keyboards. "There, There, My Dear" became the band's second top-10 single. However, after a couple of months of touring, Rowland insisted on writing new lyrics to Archer's music for "Keep It" for release as the band's next single, despite EMI's objections. The single, called "Keep It Part Two (Inferiority Part One)", was a failure, and five of the band members then quit, angered over continual personality problems with Rowland, as well as Rowland's policy of not speaking to the music press. Archer and Paterson both remained with Rowland at first, but then Archer also decided to leave, which reduced Dexys to just Rowland and Paterson, whom Rowland referred to as "the Celtic soul brothers" (in reference to Paterson's Scottish background and Rowland's Irish background).

Archer (and Leek) eventually formed The Blue Ox Babes, while the other departing members—Blythe, Spooner, Williams, "Stoker", and Talbot—formed The Bureau, which Wingfield continued to produce.

=== Dexys Mark II: 1981–1982 ===
==== The Projected Passion Revue ====
Rowland and Paterson first chose to write several new songs, so that Dexys could move forward from the split. They then brought in an old friend of theirs, Kevin "Billy" Adams (guitar/banjo), along with Seb Shelton (drums, formerly of Secret Affair), Mickey Billingham (keyboard), Brian Maurice Brummitt (who dropped his last name for his stage name "Brian Maurice", alto saxophone), Paul Speare (tenor saxophone) and Steve Wynne (bass). This new lineup also adopted a new look that included hooded tops, boxing boots, and pony tails. Along with the new image, Rowland brought in a fitness regime, which included working out together and running as a group, Rowland commenting "The togetherness of running along together just gets ... that fighting spirit going". The group would also take part in group exercise sessions before performances, and drinking before shows was strictly forbidden.

By the time the new band's first single "Plan B", produced by Alan Shacklock instead of Wingfield, was released in March 1981, the band's management had discovered that EMI had failed to pick up a mandatory contract option, so Dexys were technically no longer under contract. They asked, without success, that EMI not release the single; without promotion, the single flopped. Later in March 1981, an ad appeared in which Rowland stated that the previous members of the band had "hatched a plot to throw Kevin out and still carry on under the same name". It also cited Rowland's suggestion that "they might learn new instruments" as a reason for their displeasure. The ad announced that Dexys had been working on a new live venture, "The Midnight Runners Projected Passion Revue".

In April, Dexys prevailed to win their release from EMI, although without the financial support of a label, they were unable to mount the spring tour that had planned and had to settle for playing only five dates, including one recorded by BBC Radio 1. In June they signed to Mercury Records, where Dexys remained until their 1987 breakup. Dexys' first single for Mercury, "Show Me", produced by Tony Visconti, was released in July 1981 and reached No. 16 in the UK. The label switch was followed by a session for Richard Skinner's BBC Radio 1 show in which the band previewed tracks that would be reworked later on Too-Rye-Ay. Wynne was sacked by the group at this point, to be replaced by Mick Gallick (whom Rowland gave the stage name "Giorgio Kilkenny") on bass. Music journalist Paolo Hewitt commented about this version of Dexys: "Dexys wouldn't make a record unless they thought it was great. And they wouldn't play a gig unless they thought they were gonna be great."

Around this time, Archer played Rowland demos of Archer's new group, The Blue Ox Babes, which featured, in Rowland's words, "a Tamla-style beat with violins". The violins had been played by a Birmingham School of Music classical violin student named Helen Bevington. Rowland's first idea was to get the horn players to also play strings, as he had discussed in the March interview (with Speare on viola, which he already played, and string novices Paterson and Maurice on cello), and the horn players (with session musician support) contributed strings to the third single with the new lineup, "Liars A to E", produced by Neil Kernon, which was released in October 1981. In November, the group played a three-night stand at The Old Vic in London, with the horn section again doubling on strings. The Old Vic shows attracted unexpectedly rave reviews in the press, although these concerts were not recorded. Rowland said of these shows, "Those three nights at the Old Vic were all I wanted to say in '81."

Dexys' 1981 recordings, including all three singles (both A-sides and B-sides) as well as the tracks from the two BBC Radio 1 appearances, were released by Dexys on CD in 2007 as The Projected Passion Revue.

==== Too-Rye-Ay, stardom, and turnover ====
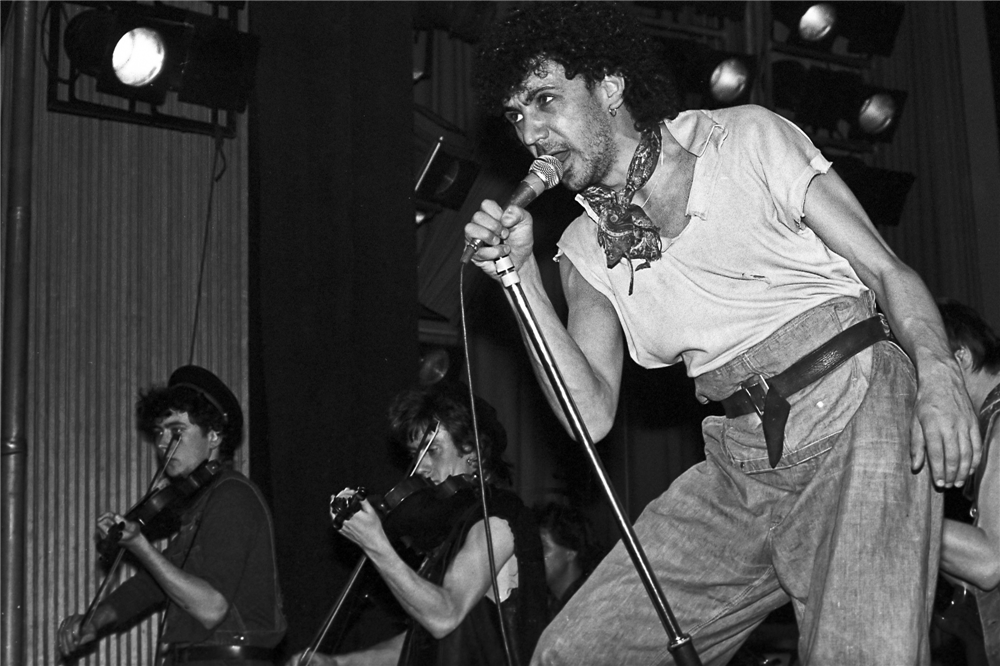
Dexys Midnight Runners in Zürich in 1982.

As Dexys prepared to record their first album for Mercury, Rowland decided that he needed more proficient string players to achieve the sound he envisioned. He sent Speare to invite Bevington to join Dexys, which she agreed to do, and Rowland gave her the Irish-sounding stage name of Helen O'Hara. Rowland also asked her to recruit two other violinists; she brought fellow students Steve Shaw and Roger Huckle, whom Rowland renamed as Steve Brennan and Roger MacDuff, and Rowland named the violin section "The Emerald Express". However, the need to rearrange all the songs for both strings and horns left the brass section of Paterson and Maurice (and to a lesser extent Speare) feeling that their role in the band had diminished. Thus, just prior to the recording sessions, Paterson and Maurice quit. Rowland was able to persuade them to remain in Dexys long enough to record the next album. Shortly thereafter, Speare also joined their planned departure.

This fractured line-up recorded Too-Rye-Ay in early 1982 with producers Rowland, Clive Langer and Alan Winstanley. The album featured a hybrid of soul and Celtic folk, similar to Archer's new direction. All of the post-breakup singles and the Projected Passion Revue material were re-arranged and re-recorded with the new lineup. The new sound was accompanied by the band's third new look, with the band attired in dungarees, scarves, leather waistcoats, and what was described as "a generally scruffy right-off-the-farm look", or "a raggle-taggle mixture of gypsy, rural Irish and Steinbeck Okie". Rowland jokingly said of the new image: "These are my best clothes. Again it just feels right for the music. Everybody else is dressing up sort of strait-laced and pretty down-to-earth and we come in wearing these and it's like, y'know here we are, a bit of hoedowning is even possible".

The first single, "The Celtic Soul Brothers" (cowritten by Rowland and Paterson with Mickey Billingham), which was released before the album, only reached number 45 on the UK charts. After the failure of this single, O'Hara said that the band believed that they immediately needed a hit single to survive. To help create momentum, the band performed a live BBC Radio 1 concert in Newcastle on 6 June 1982, which was the last appearance of the horn section of Paterson, Maurice, and Speare with Dexys.

Released right after the live appearance, Dexys' follow-up single, "Come On Eileen" (cowritten by Rowland and Paterson with Billy Adams), became that much-needed hit – a Number One hit in the UK, which also became Dexys' first single released in the United States (and second in North America, after "Seven Days Too Long", which was only released in Canada) – where it peaked at #1 in April 1983 on the Billboard Hot 100 chart. The third UK single from the album, Van Morrison's "Jackie Wilson Said (I'm in Heaven When You Smile)", also reached the top 5 in the UK singles chart. The band sang this song on the UK comedy The Young Ones. When the band performed this single on the BBC TV music show Top of the Pops, instead of a picture of Jackie Wilson, the American soul singer, for a joke the band performed in front of a photo of Jocky Wilson, the Scottish darts player.

The horn section became known as the TKO Horns and continued working with Too-Rye-Ay producers Langer and Winstanley, just as The Bureau and The Blue Ox Babes had continued working with Pete Wingfield. To replace them, Dexys added saxophonist Nick Gatfield and used various session musicians, including Kevin Gilson (saxophone) and Mark Walters and Spike Edney (trombone). Soon thereafter, Billingham also left the band but continued to appear with Dexys on a session basis until the end of the year, when he joined General Public.

=== Dexys Mark III: 1982–1987 ===
==== Touring and more turnover ====
With Paterson and Billingham's departures, the core of Dexys became Rowland, Adams, and O'Hara. In September, touring behind the hit album, Dexys embarked on The Bridge tour. On 10 October 1982, the Dexys performance at the Shaftesbury Theatre in London was recorded by Steve Barron and then released on videodisk and videocassette (and later DVD) as an edited 9-song set also entitled The Bridge.

Rowland, Adams and O'Hara jointly wrote the band's next single, "Let's Get This Straight (From the Start)" (with O'Hara also contributing piano on the recording along with Billingham). At the start of 1983, Robert "Bob" Noble replaced Billingham on keyboards and Kilkenny was replaced by John "Rhino" Edwards on bass. Dexys finally toured the U.S. in 1983, and continued to tour through that summer. However, the major success of Too-Rye-Ay became a problem for Rowland, who said in 1999 that "I was fairly comfortable being the outsider knocking on the door [but] once the door opened and I stepped inside, I was completely lost" and that he went into "complete self-destruct mode". Rowland and O'Hara also began a personal relationship during the U.S. tour; in Rowland's words, he was "obsessed with her but not enjoying the band".

==== Don't Stand Me Down and break-up ====
Although Dexys began preparing material for a new album in late 1983, once the touring stopped, the band was reduced to a nucleus of Rowland, Adams, O'Hara and Gatfield. Rowland wanted to explore different songwriting, and Dexys Midnight Runners began recording more "introspective, mournful" music. Recording and mixing the new album took almost two years and spread across Switzerland, the U.K., and the U.S; at various times, Tom Dowd, Jimmy Miller, and John Porter were attached as producers. Some seasoned performers, ex-Dexys members, and session musicians made up the rest of the band, including Vincent Crane (ex-Atomic Rooster) on piano, Julian Littman on mandolin, Tim Dancy (who had been Al Green's drummer) on drums, Tommy Evans on steel guitar, and former Dexys members "Big" Jim Paterson on trombone, Robert Noble on organ and synthesizer, and John "Rhino" Edwards on bass. Near the end of these sessions, Rowland and O'Hara's personal relationship broke up, although they continued to work together.

In September 1985, Dexys released their first new album in three years, Don't Stand Me Down. Production was originally credited to Alan Winstanley and Rowland, although reissues also credit Adams and O'Hara. The four remaining members were pictured on the album cover in the band's fourth look, an Ivy League, Brooks Brothers look, wearing ties and pin-striped suits (except for O'Hara, who wore a grey women's business suit), and with neatly combed hair. Rowland described Dexys' new look as "so clean and simple; it's a much more adult approach now".

In an interview with HitQuarters Gatfield later described the recording process as "very long and painful", and he left the group after a short tour of France and the UK. The album's most controversial feature was its use of conversational dialogue in the songs; Rowland said, "The idea of a conversation in a song is interesting to me." Commenting on this, O'Hara said that "we had to keep going ahead with what we believed" despite the length of time that the production took. Most contemporaneous reviewers strongly disliked this latest incarnation of Dexys, comparing the new look to "double glazing salesmen" and condemning the album as "a mess" and "truly awful". Only a few reviewers were supportive; for example, writing in the Melody Maker, Colin Irwin described it as "quite the most challenging, absorbing, moving, uplifting and ultimately triumphant album of the year".

Rowland at first refused to issue any singles from the album, comparing Dexys to bands like Led Zeppelin that never released singles. By the time a 3-minute edit of the 12-minute "This Is What She's Like" was released, it was too late to save the album from commercial failure, and the "Coming to Town" tour that followed the album was played before "half-empty theaters". Rowland said, "I felt that we couldn't do anything better than [Don't Stand Me Down]. It took so much out of me, but the record company threw the towel in. I think they wanted to teach me a lesson." In the aftermath, Rowland started to have issues with drug abuse. However, Dexys returned to the U.K. charts in late 1986 with the single "Because Of You", again written by and featuring the nucleus of Rowland, O'Hara and Adams (and which was used as the theme tune to a British sitcom, Brush Strokes). Dexys disbanded in early 1987.

=== Rowland solo and failed Dexys reunions: 1987–2002 ===
Rowland became a solo singer with the release of 1988's poorly received album, The Wanderer. Rowland suffered from financial problems, drug addiction and depression. Rowland said: "I'd been too confident, too arrogant. I thought everyone would hear our new music and go: 'Wow.'" When he went to sign on for a jobseeker's allowance, another unemployed person recognised him and sang "Come On Eileen".

Dexys returned to the charts in 1991 with the greatest-hits TV compilation The Very Best of Dexys Midnight Runners, which featured a number of songs that had never been released on CD, reached #12 on the charts, and was certified "Gold". Consequently, Rowland "spent most of my time in rehab" in 1993 and 1994. As part of that, Rowland made plans to reform Dexys together with Big Jim Paterson and Billy Adams, although these plans resulted in little more than a solitary TV performance in 1993. Rowland then went on the dole; as he put it in 1999, "Insanity is no fun, mate. People try to romanticize the idea of the suffering artist. At my lowest ebbs there was no romance to it at all."

After more treatment, Rowland returned once more as a solo performer and signed to Creation Records, although, in his words, "every other record label advised [Creation] against it because I was trouble." In 1997, he released his first project on Creation: a remastered and reprocessed version of Don't Stand Me Down with extensive liner notes, revised credits and titles, and two extra songs, which helped contribute to a significant reversal of opinion with regard to the album, which was now increasingly being re-evaluated and recognized as an unfairly overlooked masterwork. Following this, in 1999 Rowland released a new solo album of interpretations of "classic" songs called My Beauty, which received virtually no publicity or radio airplay and sold poorly but attracted attention for Rowland's cross-dressing cover attire. Rowland limited his pre-release publicity for the album to one interview, and he "auditioned" potential interviewers before selecting Jon Wilde. However, the negative reaction to My Beauty and the demise of Creation Records shortly after its release meant that Rowland's planned follow-up album, which would have featured Dexys performing new material, was never made. The failure caused Rowland more problems; in his own words from 2003, "Four years ago, I was nuts." Later, in March 2010, Rowland said that signing to Creation was "definitely a mistake".

=== Dexys Mark IV: 2003–present ===
==== Dexys reformed ====
While recording two new songs, "Manhood" and "My Life in England" (both credited to Rowland, Paterson, and David Ditchfield) for a forthcoming Dexys greatest hits album, Rowland recruited Welsh classical violist (and studio musician) Lucy J. Morgan to play on the sessions along with original Dexys members Pete Williams as co-vocalist and "MD" Mick Talbot on keyboards, plus Paul Taylor on trombone and Neil Hubbard on guitar. Following the sessions, Rowland offered Morgan a permanent place in the group, and she accepted. With her addition, Rowland announced the reformation of Dexys in April 2003; he told Williams that his goal for the reformed band was to be true to the memory of Dexys but to "take it somewhere else".

The Dexys greatest hits album containing the new songs, Let's Make This Precious: The Best of Dexys Midnight Runners, was released on EMI in September 2003, followed by a successful tour 'to stop the burning' in October and November. The new songs on the album were touted as new singles, with Dexys even performing "Manhood" on Top of the Pops. However, despite promotional single releases for each by EMI and airplay on national radio, neither was officially released as a commercial single. Instead, a live performance by this 2003 version of Dexys was released on DVD, entitled It Was Like This – Live (although some versions were packaged with a misleading picture of Rowland from the 1980s on the cover). It Was Like This – Live was reissued in 2012 on CD and DVD as At the Royal Court, Liverpool. It was released digitally in 2019, featuring songs from the first three albums plus "Because Of You", new song "Manhood" and the band's version of The Commodores' "Nightshift".

In 2004, another Rowland-supervised reissue of the now-out-of-print Don't Stand Me Down, subtitled "The Director's Cut", was issued on EMI with different remixing and remastering, an additional track ("Kevin Rowland's 13th Time"), and a different cover photograph showing the core trio (Rowland, Adams and O'Hara) walking in a park wearing "preppy" attire (instead of the previous business attire). In the liner notes, Rowland said that, after the remastering and track changes, the album "now sounds to me as it was intended to sound."

During a June 2005 interview on BBC Radio 2, Kevin Rowland announced that Dexys were "back in the studio" and seeking a record deal for a new album. A new track, "It's OK Johanna", appeared on the band's MySpace site in 2007, and in January 2008, Rowland told Uncut magazine further details about the album, saying in part: "I'm in the process of demo-ing the songs ... I don't know when it will be ready or who will play on the record. I want to get everything 100 percent right, and know that it's the best I can do and every note is there for a reason ... The only way I can be satisfied is to make the record I'm hearing in my head on my own terms." As Rowland repeatedly stated, "Dexys are not a revival band. They are going forward, not backward."

==== One Day I'm Going to Soar and subsequent touring ====
In 2011, with the band's name officially shortened to "Dexys", work on new material started again with Rowland, Pete Williams, Mick Talbot, Neil Hubbard, and Lucy Morgan, who had all been in Dexys since the 2003 reformation, plus Big Jim Paterson and new female vocalist Madeleine Hyland. Hyland was discovered at the last minute prior to recording, after what Rowland described as "about four years" of searching. Rowland stated that some of the songs Dexys were recording dated back "15 or 20 years." Dexys then announced that they would be embarking on another tour.

In February 2012, Rowland officially announced the imminent release of a fourth studio album for Dexys. The band also released a preview of "Now", the album's first track. The album, entitled One Day I'm Going to Soar, was released by BMG on 4 June 2012. All but one song were co-written by Rowland and Talbot, usually with other co-writers such as Paterson or Glen Matlock; the album continued in the same style as Don't Stand Me Down (featuring spoken sections in the songs), which led the album to be described as "a concept album with an unreliable narrator".

The first single from the album was "She Got a Wiggle", released 28 May 2012. They performed the song on Later... with Jools Holland in May 2012. The group toured in September 2012 in the UK, performing their new album. Talbot left the group following this tour.

In 2013, the band announced that they would play nine shows in London's West End at the Duke of York's Theatre, St Martins Lane between 15 and 27 April. These shows would become the basis for a documentary on the group entitled Nowhere Is Home, directed by Kieran Evans and Paul Kelly. Nowhere Is Home was issued in both triple-CD and double-DVD formats in October 2014 on Dexys' own label, Absolute Dexys. Dexys played more live dates in 2014; however, as Hyland was not available for several shows during the summer, Siobhan Fahey replaced her in the Dexys lineup. (Fahey's sister, actress Máire Fahey, had portrayed "Eileen" in the music video and picture sleeve for "Come On Eileen" in 1982.)

==== Let the Record Show: Dexys Do Irish and Country Soul ====
On St. Patrick's Day (Thursday, 17 March) 2016, Dexys announced the release of their fifth studio album, Let the Record Show: Dexys Do Irish and Country Soul, which was subsequently released on 100%/Warner Music on 3 June 2016. The album features interpretations of Irish folk standards plus songs written by contemporary musicians. The pre-release videos included on Dexys' Facebook page featured three band members: Rowland, Lucy Morgan, and Sean Read, whom Rowland described as the "nucleus" of the current version of Dexys. The album also includes guest violinist Helen O'Hara, recording with the band for the first time in 30 years. Rowland said that the idea for the album dated back to 1984–85, at which time the album would have been called Irish and featured only traditional Irish songs as interpreted by Dexys. O'Hara, in fact, had released such an album in 1998, entitled A Night in Ireland, which includes three of the same songs. According to Rowland, "the brief [has] expanded from solely consisting of Irish songs, to songs I've always loved and wanted to record", such as "You Wear It Well", "To Love Somebody", and "Both Sides, Now".

Dexys made its only two live appearances of 2016 to support this release: one at a private reception at the Embassy of Ireland in London on 6 June and one at Rough Trade East in London on 3 June. They also performed two songs on the ITV program Weekend on 11 June. For these three performances, O'Hara temporarily rejoined Dexys in place of Morgan, who was unavailable. The album entered the UK Official Albums Chart Top 100 at number 10 and remained there for one week.

==== Too-Rye-Ay As It Could Have Sounded and cancelled 2022 tour ====
In September 2021, Dexys announced both an upcoming 40th-anniversary remix of Too-Rye-Ay, to be done by Rowland, O'Hara, and longtime Dexys engineer Pete Schwier and tentatively entitled Too-Rye-Ay As It Could Have Sounded, and a September/October 2022 tour to support the reissue. The publicity photo for the tour, which would have played the album in its entirety along with other Dexys material, shows, from left to right, Read, Rowland, O'Hara, and Paterson. Rowland stated, "There is no way on earth I would be doing this tour or even promoting a normal 40th anniversary re-issue, if it wasn't for the opportunity to remix it and present it how it could have sounded. This is like a new album for me." The Too-Rye-Ay 40th anniversary tour was cancelled in March 2022 after Rowland was injured in a motorcycle accident and needed time to recover from this and other health issues. Although the tour would not move forward, the band promised material from the Too-Rye-Ay As It Could Have Sounded project would be performed the next time they tour.

==== The Feminine Divine and Love ====
In December 2022, 100% Records announced via Twitter that they had signed Dexys and that the band's sixth studio album, The Feminine Divine, was scheduled for release in 2023. The band lineup for The Feminine Divine is Rowland, Paterson, Sean Read and Michael Timothy.

The album was preceded by the singles and videos "I'm Going To Get Free", "Coming Home" and "My Submission". The album received 4-star reviews in Uncut magazine, Record Collector and The Guardian amongst others, and entered the UK Official Albums Chart at number 6.

The song "It's Alright Kevin (Manhood 2023)" is a re-recorded version of the song "Manhood" which was released before on the 2003 compilation album Let's Make This Precious: The Best of Dexys Midnight Runners and on the live album At The Royal Court 2003.

Dexys toured The Feminine Divine Live! across the UK and Ireland in September 2023. The show was divided into two halves with the first part featuring The Feminine Divine album performed in its entirety in the order the tracks appear on the album. The second half saw Dexys play many of the songs that appeared on the Too-Rye-Ay album: "Soon", "Plan B", "I'll Show You", "All In All (This One Last Wild Waltz)", "Until I Believe In My Soul", "Come On Eileen", "Jackie Wilson Said (I'm In Heaven When You Smile)". Other songs performed in the second part of the show were "Geno", "Free", and "Carrickfergus". The band line up for these live shows was Kevin Rowland (vocals), Mike Timothy (keyboards) Sean Read (keyboards, saxophone), Claudia Chopek (violin), Alistair Whyte (trombone) and Tim Weller (drums). Dexys toured Europe in October.

On 30 July, the band announced its first 14-date US tour in 40 years, to take place in October and November 2023. The tour was cancelled at the start of October 2023.

On 20 April 2024, Record Store Day UK, Dexys released a special vinyl release of the song "Dance With Me", remixed by Manchester art-pop band Dutch Uncles.

On 22 March 2024 the band announced the release of 2CD/3LP live album The Feminine Devine + Dexys Classics: Live!, featuring a full performance of The Feminine Divine, as well as Dexys classics including "Come On Eileen", "Geno", "Jackie Wilson Said", "Plan B" and many more. It was released on 24 May, accompanied by the announcement of a series of UK festival shows, including an appearance at Glastonbury. The setlist for the 2024 Festival Tour featured songs from each of the band's albums. The shows opened with "To Love Somebody" from 2016's Let The Record Show and closed with "This Is What She's Like". Mojo reviewed the Glastonbury show positively, saying "A slimmed down Dexys win out thanks to a magnificent turn from their leader."

In March 2026, it was announced that the band had signed to Heavenly Recordings and would be heading out on a UK and Ireland tour for their first shows under the name Dexys Midnight Runners since 2003. In May 2026, the band announced their sixth studio album Love. A single, "My Life in England Pt. 1", was shared the same day. The album was released on 4 September 2026 and is notably the band's first under the original name of Dexys Midnight Runners since 1985; furthermore, press materials for the album noted that it "may mark the final chapter" in the band's "extraordinary musical journey".

== Members ==
Current members

- Kevin Rowland – lead vocals, rhythm guitar, piano, bass (1978–1987, 2003–present)
- Jim Paterson – trombone (1978–1982, 1985, 2005–2016, 2021–present)
- Sean Read – guitar, saxophone, keyboards, backing vocals (2013–present)
- Michael Timothy – keyboards (2013–present)
- Lucy Morgan – violin, viola (2003–2021, 2024–present)

Former members

- Kevin "Al" Archer – guitar, backing vocals (1978–1981)
- Pete Williams – bass, backing vocals (1978–1980, 2003–2014)
- Pete Saunders – keyboards (1978–1980)
- John Jay – drums (1978–1979)
- Terry De Sarge – drums (1979)
- Steve Spooner – saxophone (1978–1980)
- Jeff Blythe – saxophone (1978–1980)
- Geoff Kent – trumpet (1978–1979)
- Bobby Ward – drums (1979–1980)
- Andy Leek – keyboards (1980) (died 2024)
- Andy Growcott – drums (1980)
- Mick Talbot – keyboards (1980, 2003–2013)
- Kevin "Billy" Adams – lead guitar, backing vocals, banjo (1981–1987)
- Helen O'Hara – violin, backing vocals (1981–1987, 2016, 2021–2022)
- Mickey Billingham – keyboards, accordion (1981–1982)
- Seb Shelton – drums (1981–1984)
- Paul Speare – saxophone, flute (1981–1982)
- Brian Maurice – saxophone (1981–1982)
- Giorgio Kilkenny – bass (1981–1982)
- Steve Brennan – violin, accordion (1981–1984)
- Roger MacDuff – violin (1981–1984)
- John Edwards – bass (1982–1985)
- Nick Gatfield – saxophone (1982–1985)
- Spike Edney – trombone (1982–1984)
- Robert Noble – organ (1982–1985)
- Vincent Crane – piano (1985)
- Tim Dancy – drums (1985)
- Julian Litman – mandolin (1985)
- Mick Bolton – piano (1985–1986)
- Pol Coussee – saxophone (1985–1986)
- Fayyaz Virji – trombone (1985–1986)
- Penn Pennington – guitar (1985–1986)
- Jerry Preston – bass (1985–1986)
- Philip Blakeman – guitar, accordion (2003–2005)
- Comedius Dave – horn, vibes (2003–2006)
- Neil Hubbard – guitar (2003–2012)
- Julian Crampton – bass (2003–2005)
- Crispin Taylor – drums (2003–2005)
- Volker Janssen – keyboards (2003–2005)
- Paul Taylor – trombone (2003–2005)
- Andy Hobson – bass (2013–2021)
- Madeleine Hyland – vocals (2011–2014)
- Tim Cansfield – guitar (2013–2014)
- David Ruffy – drums (2013–2014)
- Siobhan Fahey – vocals (2014)
- Billy Stookes – drums (2016–2021)
- Mark Kavuma – trumpet (2016–2021)

== Awards ==
- 1983 Brit Awards – Best British single (for "Come On Eileen")

== Discography ==
- Searching for the Young Soul Rebels (1980)
- Too-Rye-Ay (1982)
- Don't Stand Me Down (1985)
- One Day I'm Going to Soar (2012)
- Let the Record Show: Dexys Do Irish and Country Soul (2016)
- The Feminine Divine (2023)
- Love (2026)
