= Helen O'Hara =

British musician

Helen O'Hara (born Helen Bevington; 5 November 1956) is a British musician. She was a member and violinist of Dexys Midnight Runners from 1982 to 1987, performing on songs such as "Come on Eileen", and in 2021 rejoined the band.

== Early years ==
Helen Bevington began her music career in her home town Bristol, joining Gunner Kade, a band led by Ken Pustelnik, drummer from The Groundhogs. She then joined the band Wisper, which combined their solo career with backing various artists. Wisper evolved into Uncle Po (1976–78), which won the BBC's Quiz Kid band competition in 1977 and subsequently released a single on the BEEB label entitled "Use My Friends" (so rare that a copy sold in 2006 on eBay for over £80). Uncle Po consisted of Rob Williams on guitar, Gavin King on vocals, Lyndon Parry on bass and vocals, Andy Wills on sax, flute, and vocals, O'Hara (as Helen "Spike" Bevington) on violin and keyboards, and Steve "Basher" Bennett and Jimmer Hill on drums.

== Dexys Midnight Runners ==
O'Hara left Uncle Po in late 1977 to study music at Birmingham School of Music (now UCE Birmingham Conservatoire), graduating in 1982 with an offer to join the Bilbao Symphony. However, after she recorded some demos with the Blue Ox Babes, a band founded by Dexys founder Kevin 'Al' Archer, Archer recommended her to his former partner Kevin Rowland, who was experimenting with adding strings.

She was offered a place with Rowland's new line-up of Dexys — the result of a session she and two other violinists from the university had carried out as part of Rowland's decision to revamp the band's sound and image. Rowland has said he saw O'Hara standing at a bus stop with her violin case and stopped to meet her. The more prosaic truth is that, of the three violinists at the session, she was the only one with any rock 'n' roll experience, and therefore the only one to be able to play a solo by feel. This she did well enough to be immediately drafted into Dexys. To fit in with Dexys' Celtic image, she took the stage surname O'Hara.

Within months she was touring the UK, followed by the US, as "Come On Eileen" reached No. 1 in the charts in both countries. She also began a personal relationship with Rowland.

With the singles "Jackie Wilson Said (I'm in Heaven When You Smile)" (a Van Morrison cover) and "Let's Get This Straight (From the Start)" maintaining their popularity, the group continued to tour through 1983 with a nucleus of Rowland, O'Hara and Billy Adams, augmented by other musicians.

Beginning in 1984, and with the assistance of both studio musicians and former members, Dexys wrote and recorded Don't Stand Me Down, which was released in late 1985. Earlier in 1985, Rowland appointed O'Hara as Dexys' musical director. O'Hara later commented that the American musicians that they worked with "couldn't quite make out my position in the band, and the whole thing." Some of the lyrics and songs from that album, especially "This Is What She's Like", were written by Rowland about her, which she said made them "pretty uncomfortable" to record.

The lengthy, contentious sessions for that album strained both her relationship with Rowland and the core of that version of Dexys. Although Dexys returned to the charts with "Because of You" (co-written by Rowland, O'Hara, and Adams) in 1986, and O'Hara's "fan club" letter in November 1986 discussed imminent recording sessions for a new Dexys album, she later said that at that point "Dexys were finished really" and the band broke up in 1987.

After Dexys was reformed by Rowland in 2003, O'Hara appeared as a guest artist on Dexys' fifth album Let the Record Show: Dexys Do Irish and Country Soul in 2016, and she temporarily rejoined the band for its two live performances and one television performance that year in place of Dexys' current violinist, Lucy Morgan, who was unavailable.

== Later career ==
After leaving Dexys, O'Hara worked with rock performers such as Graham Parker, Tanita Tikaram (with whom she recorded "Good Tradition" and toured from 1988 to 1990) and Mary Coughlan.

In 1990, she released a solo album entitled Romanza, with a backing band including keyboardist Nicky Hopkins, which was later reissued as Southern Hearts, and in 1998, she released her second solo album, A Night in Ireland. After a 25-year gap, O'Hara and Tikaram resumed performing live together in 2015.

== Solo discography ==
- Southern Hearts (Romanza) (1990) – New World Music CD 212
- A Night in Ireland (1998) – New World Music CD 450
