= Seb Shelton =

British drummer

Seb Shelton is a British musician, who was the drummer for bands such as the Young Bucks (1978–1979), Secret Affair (1979–1980), and Dexys Midnight Runners (1981–1984). Shelton was offered the drummer's job in the Specials but turned it down.

Shelton went on to manage other rock bands and musicians including the Woodentops, Tackhead, Adrian Sherwood, Keith Leblanc, Shelleyan Orphan, and Julian Cope.
