= Kevin Rowland =

British singer (born 1953)

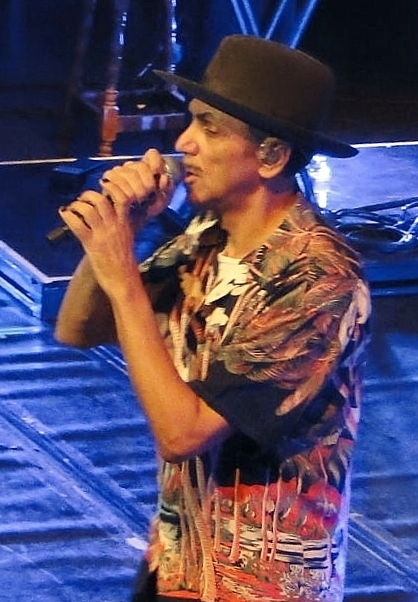
- Rowland in 2012

Background information
- Born: 17 August 1953 (age 73); Wednesfield, Wolverhampton, England
- Genres: Punk rock; new wave; soul; pop
- Occupations: Singer; songwriter; musician
- Instruments: Vocals; guitar; bass; piano
- Years active: 1974–present
- Labels: Mercury, Creation
- Member of: Dexys Midnight Runners
- Formerly of: Lucy and the Lovers; the Killjoys

Kevin Rowland (born 17 August 1953) is a British singer and musician best known as the frontman for the pop band Dexys Midnight Runners (known as Dexys from 2003 to 2026). The band had several hits in the early 1980s, the most notable being "Geno" and "Come On Eileen", both of which reached number one on the UK Singles Chart.

== Early life ==
Rowland was born in Wednesfield, Staffordshire (now West Midlands), on 17 August 1953 to Irish parents from Crossmolina, County Mayo, Ireland, and he lived for three years in Ireland from the age of one year old before returning to Wolverhampton. The family moved to Harrow when he was 11 and he left school aged 15.

Before his music career, Rowland worked as a hairdresser.

== Career ==
Rowland's first group, Lucy & the Lovers, were influenced by Roxy Music and turned out to be short-lived. His next project, the punk rock act the Killjoys, were slightly more successful, releasing the single "Johnny Won't Get To Heaven" in 1977.

Alienated by the punk scene, Rowland, together with Killjoys guitarist Kevin Archer, formed a new soul-influenced group, Dexys Midnight Runners. Many of the group's songs were inspired by Rowland's Irish ancestry and were recognisable through Rowland's idiosyncratic vocal style. On forming the band Rowland thought it was "important to have a vocal style", he later recalled, "and I had the idea of putting that 'crying' voice on", partly inspired by General Johnson of Chairmen of the Board. The band had several hit singles, such as "Come On Eileen" (1982).

At the end of the 1980s, Rowland wanted to explore different songwriting, and Dexys Midnight Runners began recording more "introspective, mournful" music. The new material was unsuccessful; Dexys Midnight Runners were dropped by their label and disbanded. Rowland said: "I'd been too confident, too arrogant. I thought everyone would hear our new music and go: 'Wow.'" He became reliant on drugs, lost his money, and entered rehab.

When Dexys disbanded in 1987, Rowland recorded a solo album, The Wanderer, which, together with its three singles, was a commercial failure. His next release was not until 1999 when he recorded a collection of interpretations of classic songs called My Beauty, the album cover of which depicted a heavily made-up Rowland in a dress and lingerie.

In 2003, Rowland reformed Dexys Midnight Runners—featuring only one other original member, bassist Pete Williams, who fulfilled the role as Rowland's co-vocalist—and embarked on a successful comeback tour backed up with a greatest hits compilation album including two newly recorded songs, "Manhood" and "My Life in England". Both of these new songs were radio tested by the record label, but neither received enough airplay to be considered for release.

In 2012 Rowland re-launched Dexys Midnight Runners as "Dexys" with a new album One Day I'm Going to Soar accompanied by a UK tour. Rowland has always identified strongly with his Irish background and in 2016 Dexys released their fifth album, Let the Record Show: Dexys Do Irish and Country Soul, featuring interpretations of Irish folk songs such as "Women of Ireland" and "Carrickfergus", among others.

Since around 2005, Rowland has hosted a DJ tour in clubs and venues throughout the UK. His set includes his personal favourites, vintage soul and pop numbers from such notables as T-Rex, Roxy Music, and Harold Melvin & the Blue Notes.

In mid-2020 Rowland released a new video for the song "Rag Doll", a promo which features his grandson Roo. In September 2020, My Beauty was re-released by Cherry Red Records and finally became a UK chart hit in October, peaking at number 73 in the albums chart.

== Discography ==
=== Studio albums ===
Year	Album details
1988	The Wanderer: Release date: 1988; Label: Mercury Records
1999	My Beauty: Release date: 21 September 1999; Label: Creation Records

=== Singles ===
Year	Single	Peak positions	Album
Year	Single	UK	Album
1988	"Walk Away"	95	The Wanderer
1988	"Tonight"	81	The Wanderer
1988	"Young Man"	102	The Wanderer
1999	"Concrete and Clay"	—	My Beauty
"—" denotes releases that did not chart

=== Guest appearances ===
Year	Song	Album
1988	"Sean" (with The Proclaimers)	Sunshine on Leith
