= Geno (song) =

Single by Dexys Midnight Runners

from the album Searching for the Young Soul Rebels
- B-side: "Breakin' Down the Walls of Heartache"
- Released: 14 March 1980
- Recorded: 1979
- Genre: Blue-eyed soul; new wave; R&B
- Length: 3:31
- Label: Late Night Feelings/EMI
- Songwriter(s): Kevin Archer, Kevin Rowland
- Producer(s): Pete Wingfield

Dexys Midnight Runners singles chronology
"Dance Stance" (1979)	"Geno" (1980)	"There, There, My Dear" (1980)

"Geno" is a song by Dexys Midnight Runners, released in 1980 as the lead single from their debut album Searching for the Young Soul Rebels. Written by Kevin Archer and Kevin Rowland, it was the band's second overall single and their first UK number one, staying at the top of the singles chart for two weeks. In Ireland, the song charted at number two.

== Composition ==
The song is a tribute to soul singer Geno Washington, and performed in approximately the style of Geno Washington's Ram Jam Band. Rowland and Archer began working on the song in early 1979, with Rowland writing lyrics to Archer's music.

The song bears resemblance to Zoot Money's Big Roll Band's "One and Only Man" and the Turtles' "Happy Together".

The crowd noises during the "Geno! Geno! Geno!" chant at the beginning and end of the song are sampled from Van Morrison's acclaimed 1974 live album It's Too Late to Stop Now, a favourite of Rowland's. The chant is reminiscent of Washington's 1960s performances, whereby the shows' compères would excite the audience before Washington took to the stage. The song's saxophone riff was inspired by Washington's "(I Gotta) Hold On to My Love", the B-side to "Michael (the Lover)".

== Release and reception ==
EMI, the band's record label, wanted their recording of Johnny Johnson and the Bandwagon's "Breakin' Down the Walls of Heartache" to be released, feeling that "Geno" was only suitable as a B-side. The band refused, though the possibility of a double A-side was suggested. However, "Geno" was released (backed with "Breakin' Down the Walls of Heartache") on 15 March 1980. It slowly climbed the charts until it reached number one on 3 May.

Record Mirror described "Geno" as "a turgid eulogy with few redeeming features", stating that they believed Dexys Midnight Runners had missed the opportunity to have the same success as Madness and the Specials. Similarly, Robbi Millar from Sounds wrote in March 1980 that "the most boring band of 1979 burst forth again with this erratic and timeless tribute to their hero, Geno Washington, who would probably keep his earplugs in if he heard it".

"Geno" soon became a crowd favourite, with audiences chanting for the song throughout whole concerts. Pete Saunders said that the band found it best to play the song once at the beginning of the set, and once towards the end.

The song is included in 1001 Songs You Must Hear Before You Die, where it is written that the song was inspired by Washington's "Michael (the Lover)" and subsequently inspired the Specials' "Ghost Town".

== Personnel ==
- Kevin Rowland: vocals
- Kevin "Al" Archer: guitar, vocals
- Pete Williams: bass
- Andy "Stoker" Growcott: drums
- Andy Leek: organ
- Pete Saunders: organ
- Geoff Blythe: saxophone
- Steve Spooner: alto saxophone
- "Big" Jim Paterson: trombone
