= Hand to Mouth (album) =

Studio album by General Public
- Released: 6 October 1986
- Genre: New wave
- Length: 42:46
- Label: I.R.S.
- Producer: Dave Wakeling; David Leonard; Ranking Roger

General Public chronology
All the Rage (1984)	Hand to Mouth (1986)	Rub It Better (1995)

Singles from Hand to Mouth
- 1. "Come Again" Released: 1986; 2. "Faults and All" Released: 1986; 3. "Too Much or Nothing" Released: 1986; 4. "In Conversation" Released: 1986

Professional ratings
Review scores
Source	Rating
AllMusic	3/5 stars
The Encyclopedia of Popular Music	3/5 stars
The Rolling Stone Album Guide	2.5/5 stars

Hand to Mouth is the second studio album by the English new wave band General Public, released on 6 October 1986 by I.R.S. Records.

The album peaked at No. 83 on the Billboard 200 chart.

== Critical reception ==
Trouser Press wrote that "the music goes down smoothly enough, but without any lasting impression."

== Track listing ==
1. "Come Again!" – 3:43 (Mickey Billingham, David Wakeling)
2. "Faults and All" – 3:35 (Roger Charlery, Horace Panter, Wakeling)
3. "Forward as One" – 6:08 (Wakeling)
4. "Murder" – 4:22 (Billingham, Wakeling)
5. "Cheque in the Post" – 3:39 (Billingham, Charlery)
6. "Too Much or Nothing" – 4:25 (Wakeling)
7. "Love Without the Fun" – 3:29 (Billingham, Wakeling)
8. "In Conversation" – 5:43 (Billingham, Charlery)
9. "Never All There" – 4:04 (Billingham, Charlery, Wakeling)
10. "Cry on Your Own Shoulder" – 3:54 (Charlery, Wakeling)

=== 1993 I.R.S. Records re-issue bonus tracks ===
1. "General Public" (12" Version) (Charlery, Wakeling)
2. "Limited Balance" (Charlery, Wakeling)
3. "All the Rage" (Billingham, Andy "Stoker" Growcott, Panter, Kevin White)
4. "Taking the Day Off" (Wakeling)
5. "Day to Day" (Live) (Charlery, Wakeling)
6. "Where's the Line?" (Live) (Billingham, Charlery, Panter, Wakeling)
7. "Tenderness (Live)" (Billingham, Charlery, Wakeling)
8. "Hot You're Cool (Live)" (Billingham Charlery, Panter, Wakeling)

All writing credits as per ASCAP database.

== Personnel ==
General Public

- Dave Wakeling – vocals, guitar
- Ranking Roger – vocals
- Gianni Minardi – guitar
- Horace Panter – bass
- Mickey Billingham – keyboards
- Mario Minardi – drums

with:

- Saxa – saxophone
- Steve Brennan – violin
- Gaspar Lawal – percussion
- Pato Banton – toasting
- Digby Cleaver – rap
- Justine Carpenter, Sandra Loban – vocals

Technical

- Martin Burgoyne – cover art
- Peter Ashworth – photography
- C More Tone – design
