= All the Rage (General Public album) =

Studio album by General Public
- Released: January 1984
- Recorded: 1983–1984
- Studios: AIR (London); The Town House (London); The Manor (Shipton-on-Cherwell); Redan Studios; Genetic Studios (Streatley); The Lot
- Genres: New wave; two-tone; post-punk; dance-rock
- Length: 40:48
- Label: I.R.S.
- Producers: Colin Fairley; Gavin MacKillop; General Public

General Public chronology
All the Rage (1984)	Hand to Mouth (1986)

Singles from All the Rage
- 1. "General Public" Released: 1984; 2. "Tenderness" Released: May 1984; 3. "Never You Done That" Released: 1985; 4. "Hot You're Cool" Released: 1985

All the Rage is the debut studio album by the English new wave band General Public, released in January 1984 by I.R.S. Records. It was recorded digitally. After his expulsion from the Clash, Mick Jones was a founding member of General Public. Though he is listed in the credits of the album as a member, Jones left General Public part way through the recording process and was replaced by Kevin White. White's picture appears on the back cover; Jones' picture does not. Jones did play guitar on many of the album's tracks however, including "Tenderness". The album spent 39 weeks on the US Billboard 200 chart and reached its peak position of No. 26 in mid-February 1985. However, it failed to chart in their home country.

The eponymous track "General Public" was the first single released from the album, peaking at No. 60 on the UK singles chart in 1984. Later in the year, the band fared even better in North America, where their second single "Tenderness" was a Top 30 hit in Canada (No. 11) and the US (No. 27). The song's success benefited from appearing in the John Hughes films Sixteen Candles (1984) and Weird Science (1985) from the time period, and it would later appear in Amy Heckerling's Clueless (1995) and in the horror film Devil's Due (2014).

== Critical reception ==
Professional ratings
Review scores
Source	Rating
AllMusic	4.5/5 stars

In a retrospective review for AllMusic, critic Stewart Mason wrote of the album, "All the Rage is certainly an album of its time -- those weedy synth-drums on the otherwise kinda funky "As a Matter of Fact" are a dead giveaway that this was recorded in 1984—but it sounds less dated than many of its contemporaries due to Wakeling's keen songwriting skills."

== Track listing ==
Side one

1. "Hot You're Cool" (Mickey Billingham, Roger Charlery, Horace Panter, Dave Wakeling) – 3:47
2. "Tenderness" (Billingham, Charlery, Wakeling) – 3:34
3. "Anxious" (Charlery, Wakeling) – 4:19
4. "Never You Done That" (Billingham, Charlery, Wakeling) – 4:08
5. "Burning Bright" (Billingham, Charlery, Wakeling) – 4:30

Side two

6. "As a Matter of Fact" (Billingham, Charlery, Panter, Wakeling) – 5:22
7. "Are You Leading Me On?" (Charlery, Panter, Wakeling) – 3:09
8. "Day-to-Day" (Charlery, Wakeling) – 3:28
9. "Where's the Line?" (Billingham, Charlery, Panter, Wakeling) – 4:09
10. "General Public" (Charlery, Wakeling) – 4:22

== Personnel ==
Credits are adapted from the All the Rage liner notes.

General Public

- Dave Wakeling — vocals; guitar
- Ranking Roger — vocals; bass guitar; keyboards; drums
- Mickey Billingham — keyboards; vocals
- Kevin White — guitar
- Horace Panter — bass guitar
- Andy "Stoker" Growcott — drums
- Mick Jones — guitar (on "Hot You’re Cool", "Tenderness", "Never You Done That", "As a Matter of Fact", "Where’s the Line?" and possibly other tracks)

Additional musicians

- Gary Barnacle — saxophone on "General Public"
- Saxa — saxophone on "General Public"
- Michael "Bami" Rose — saxophone on "Anxious"
- Vin Gordon — trombone on "Anxious"
- Steve Sidwell — trumpet on "Where's the Line?"
- Eddie "Tan Tan" Thornton — trumpet on "Anxious"
- Bob Porter — bassoon on "Tenderness"
- Aswad Horn Section — brass on "Anxious"
- Justine Carpenter — backing vocals on "Tenderness", "Burning Bright" and "General Public"
- Alicia Previn — violin

Technical

- Colin Fairley, Gavin MacKillop — recording; mixing
- Peter Ashworth — photography

== Charts ==
Chart	Peak position
Canada Top Albums/CDs (RPM)	19
US Billboard 200	26

== Music videos ==
The music video for “Never You Done That” was filmed on the 4th Floor of the Puck Building at the corner of Houston and Lafayette Streets in New York. The video shows views of Houston Street and environs from the northwest windows. Views to the west on Houston were more expansive prior to the construction of a multi-story building across Lafayette Street in the late 2010s. Visible in the video directly across the street is what is likely, judging from its shape, an Amoco gas station sign. A gas station was located on that site until approximately 2014. Also visible in front of the gas station are two entrances to the Broadway-Lafayette Street subway station. Further to the west are visible other extant buildings, such as the Cable Building (611 Broadway) and Breen Towers (180 West Houston) with its distinctive rooftop water tower.
