= Rub It Better =

Studio album by General Public
- Released: 4 April 1995
- Recorded: 1994–95
- Genre: New wave; reggae
- Label: Epic
- Producer: Jerry Harrison

General Public chronology
Hand to Mouth (1986)	Rub It Better (1995)	Classic Masters (2002)

Professional ratings
Review scores
Source	Rating
AllMusic	3/5 stars
Calgary Herald	C
Chicago Tribune	1.5/4 stars
The Encyclopedia of Popular Music	3/5 stars
MusicHound Rock: The Essential Album Guide	3/5 stars
Rolling Stone	3.5/5 stars
Vancouver Sun	3/4 stars

Rub It Better is the third studio album by the English new wave band General Public, released on 4 April 1995 by Epic Records. The band had not recorded together in almost 10 years.

== Production ==
The album was produced by Jerry Harrison, former keyboardist and guitarist for Talking Heads. The group chose to return to the ska and reggae sound of the Beat.

== Critical reception ==
The Los Angeles Times called the album "a tuneful collection that deftly combines an assortment of reggae, rock and dance-pop colors--the trademark of the Beat and the first edition of General Public." The Kingston Whig-Standard wrote that "the closest comparison is to B.A.D. (Big Audio Dynamite), whose leader, Mick Jones, was an honorary member of General Public for its first album and appears here again."

== Track listing ==
1. "It Must Be Tough" – 5:34 (Dave Wakeling, Michael Railton, Roger Charlery)
2. "Rainy Days" – 4:06 (Charlery, Railton, Horace Panter)
3. "Hold It Deep" – 4:34 (Wakeling, Charlery, Railton, Andy "Stoker" Growcott)
4. "Big Bed" – 4:12 (Norman Jones, Wakeling, Charlery, Railton)
5. "Punk" – 3:05 (Charlery)
6. "Friends Again" – 5:41 (Wakeling, David Ricketts, Railton)
7. "It's Weird" – 5:50 (Charlery, Railton)
8. "Never Not Alone" – 4:21 (Wakeling, Charlery, Railton)
9. "Handgun" – 4:52 (Wakeling, Railton)
10. "Blowhard" – 4:38 (Wakeling, Railton)
11. "Warm Love" – 3:35 (Van Morrison)
12. "Rub It Better" – 5:32 (Charlery, Wakeling, Patrick Murray)

== Personnel ==
General Public

- David Wakeling – vocals, guitar
- Ranking Roger – vocals, programming
- Michael Railton – keyboards, vocals
- Norman Jones – percussion, vocals
- Wayne Lothian – bass
- Dan Chase – drums

with:

- Jerry Harrison – guitars, keyboards, background vocals
- Mick Jones – guitars
- Chris Spedding – guitars
- Alex Weir – guitars
- Chris Karn – guitars
- Chris Manos – guitars
- Marc Antoine Vouilloux – guitars
- Saxa – saxophone
- Andrew Gayle – saxophone
- Tom Fabre – saxophone
- David Longoria – trumpet/ trumpet solo "Friends Again"
- Greg Smith – trombone
- Norton Buffalo – harmonica
- Pato Banton – toasting
- Arlene Newson – background vocals
- Andrea Gaines – background vocals
- Sharon Celani – background vocals
