= Dance Stance =

Single by Dexy's Midnight Runners
- B-side: "I'm Just Looking"
- Released: November 1979
- Recorded: 1979
- Genre: Soul
- Length: 3:41
- Label: Oddball Records
- Songwriter: Kevin Rowland

Dexy's Midnight Runners singles chronology
"Dance Stance" (1979)	"Geno" (1980)

"Dance Stance" is the first single by Dexys Midnight Runners. Written by frontman Kevin Rowland, the song was released in 1979 on the independent label Oddball Records. It reached No. 40 on the UK Singles Chart in early 1980.

The song addresses anti-Irish sentiment that had become prevalent during the ongoing troubles in Northern Ireland, with Rowland himself being of Irish parentage. It references a range of Irish playwrights and writers including Oscar Wilde, Brendan Behan, Seán O'Casey, George Bernard Shaw, Samuel Beckett, Eugene O'Neill, Edna O’Brien and Laurence Sterne. The angry delivery of the lyrics reflect the punk sensibility of the time, although the style of the music is more the soul/Northern soul style from which the band's name is derived (the name is a reference to drug-fuelled dancing in the all-nighters which were a feature of the Northern soul scene).

"Dance Stance" was performed by Rowland (vocals, credited as 'Carlo Rolan'), Kevin "Al" Archer (vocals, guitar), "Big" Jim Paterson (trombone), Geoff "JB" Blythe (saxophone), Steve "Babyface" Spooner (alto saxophone), Pete Saunders (keyboard), Pete Williams (bass) and Bobby "Jnr" Ward (drums).

A re-recorded version appeared on the band's debut album, Searching for the Young Soul Rebels, under the original working title "Burn It Down".

== Personnel ==
- Kevin Rowland (as 'Carlo Rolan'): Vocals
- Al Archer: Rhythm Guitar/Vocals
- Pete Williams: Bass/Vocals
- J.B.: Tenor Sax
- Big Jim Paterson: Trombone
- Steve Spooner: Alto Sax
- Pete Saunders: Piano/Organ
- Bobby Junior: Drums
