= Andy Leek =

English musician (1958–2024)

- Born: 1958
- Origin: The Midlands, England
- Died: 3 November 2024 (aged 66)
- Occupation: Singer-songwriter
- Instrument(s): Keyboards, guitar, harmonica
- Years active: 1978–2024
- Labels: Birds Nest, Parlophone, Beggars Banquet, Fascination, Atlantic, Undiscovered Classics, Polydor
- Website: www.andyleek.co.uk

Andy Leek (1958 – 3 November 2024) was an English singer, songwriter, poet and musician, known for his work with Dexys Midnight Runners and Sir George Martin. He was an original member of Dexys Midnight Runners and played on the number one single "Geno". He also wrote the single "Twist in the Dark" for Anni-Frid Lyngstad of ABBA. His solo single "Say Something" reached the number 1 position in Lebanon during the civil war.

== Biography ==
Leek began his musical career while still at school in the progressive punk band the Wailing Cocks. The band released two singles on independent label Birds Nest, recorded two sessions for John Peel's Radio 1 show, Kid Jensen Live and Radio 2's in Concert Live. However, the band's career was cut short by the tragic death of their guitarist and Leek's best friend Alan Boyle.

At the age of 21, Leek joined Dexys Midnight Runners in late October 1979, playing on early recordings such as the hit single "Geno" and four other tracks on their debut album Searching for the Young Soul Rebels. Just before the band were at No. 1 in the charts with this track, Leek left to be a solo artist, saying that he "Really hating being famous all of a sudden ... Just because I've been on Top of the Pops doesn't mean I should get any more respect. I didn't want people asking for my autograph all of the time."

Two earlier songs Leek had recorded with the Wailing Cocks were then licensed to Beggars Banquet Records for release as a double-A-sided solo single: "Move On (In Your Maserati)" / "Ruben Decides". These were both played on Radio One and were single of the week in Sounds.

In early 1981, Leek teamed up with fellow ex-Dexys Midnight Runners member Kevin "Al" Archer in his new band the Blue Ox Babes in which Leek played piano, harmonium, harmonica and sang backing vocals.

Some months later, on the strength of a demo tape of 16 new songs, Beggars Banquet paid for an album's worth of new material but this lay dormant until their belated release as Midnight Music on Leek's own Undiscovered Classics label in 2009. One song from these sessions, "Twist in the Dark", was recorded by Frida from ABBA for her 1984 solo album Shine, via a recommendation from Leek's friend Kirsty MacColl. Frida's version was also issued as a single around the world and she described this song as "her favourite song she had recorded outside of Abba".

For the rest of the 1980s, Leek pursued his own career as a musician, as well as writing a musical interpretation of a Dylan Thomas poem which was recorded and released by Tom Jones, and acting alongside Billie Whitelaw and David Van Day as an aspiring songwriter in the Tony Klinger-produced 1985 film Promo-Man. A short-lived deal with indie label Fascination Records in 1984 led to two singles credited to Leek: "Soul Darling", with Specials producer Dave Jordan, and a version of ABBA's "Dancing Queen" produced by Tony Visconti .

In 1988, after signing a publishing and management contract with Hit n Run music, Atlantic Records in New York, Leek was honoured that, after hearing five of his tracks, George Martin had considered three of the five tracks as potential number ones and he agreed to produce Leek's 1988 album, Say Something. It was recorded in Martin's AIR Studios with such musicians as Steve Howe of Yes, Clem Clempson, Luís Jardim on percussion, Alan Murphy of Level 42 on guitar, Peter-John Vettese (keyboards, from Jethro Tull), and veteran bassist Mo Foster's 36-piece orchestra on various tracks and the London Community Gospel Choir on "Golden Doors".

George Martin said that Leek "was one of the greatest artists he had ever produced". The first release from the album was "Please Please".

In 2007, a Lebanese DJ/producer called aXess contacted Leek to request he do a salsa remix of the track "Say Something" which had reached the number 1 position in Lebanon during the civil war.

Leek recorded three further albums, Eternity Beckons (including the single "All Around the World" which proved popular in Germany), the self-produced Sacrifice and Bliss (which yielded the single "Forgotten People") and Waking Up the World (with the single of the same name), all of which were released on his own label. Eternity Beckons was also briefly available on a small Spanish label, Ouver Records. The song "Forgotten People" was also released on a compilation album which made it to number one in Spain.

After a period of studying musical composition at Cardiff University, Leek formed his own "party band", Andy Leek & the Blue Angels, mostly at charity balls. Leek has also appeared on various TV shows: The James Whale Show, Never Mind the Buzzcocks, Later with Jools Holland and Children in Need three years running.

In 2010, Leek remixed the album Say Something titled as Say Something Revisited, released with the single "What's the Problem?".

In May 2013, Leek released the 16-track double concept album Waking Up the World. For this album, each song has a sister song which reflects and explores the other side of its counterpart. This results in seven themes which tell a story of youth, experience, realisation and return.

Also in 2013, Leek started releasing his past music on YouTube with many lyric videos created.

Leek died following a long battle with Parkinson's disease on 3 November 2024, at the age of 66.

== Discography ==
=== Albums ===
- Say Something (Atlantic, 1988)
- Eternity Beckons (Spanish-only release) (Ouver, circa 1997)
- Sacrifice and Bliss (unissued, 2000)
- Midnight Music (Undiscovered Classics, 2009; recorded 1979–1982)
- Say Something Revisited (Undiscovered Classics, 2010)
- Waking Up the World (Undiscovered Classics, 2013)

=== Singles ===
- "Move On (In Your Maserati)" (Beggars Banquet, 1980)
- "Soul Darling" (Fascination, 1984)
- "Dancing Queen" (Fascination, 1984)
- "Say Something" (Atlantic, 1988)
- "Please Please" (Atlantic, 1988)
- "Holdin' onto You" (Atlantic, 1988)
- "All Around the World" (Polydor, 1996)
- "Forgotten People" (Gotham, 1999)
- "What's the Problem?" (Undiscovered Classics, 2010)
- "Homeground" (Undiscovered Classics, 2010)
- "Waking Up the World" (Undiscovered Classics, 2013)
- "Here in Our Youth" (Undiscovered Classics, 2013)
