= The Bureau (band) =

English New Wave soul music group

The Bureau were an English new wave soul group formed in November 1980 in Birmingham, England, when the original line-up of Dexys Midnight Runners split up. The Bureau retained their Dexys roots and played powerful brass-driven soul sounds. They are best known for their single "Only For Sheep", which reached No. 5 in Australia.

== History ==
=== Formation ===
Ex-Dexys members Pete Williams (bass), Geoff Blythe (tenor saxophone), Steve Spooner (alto saxophone), Stoker (drums) and Mick Talbot (keyboards) engaged the services of manager Dave Corke, a previous manager of Dexys Midnight Runners, and promoted concerts in Birmingham to raise money to finance the group.

In December 1980, the band was joined by Rob Jones (guitar and trumpet), Tony Bischoff (bass) and Archie Brown (vocals) from a group called The Upset, which had supported Dexys on tour. The Bureau began rehearsals with a trombonist known only as Jake (formerly of the R&B, soul, funk act Gonzalez), who came and went.

=== "Only For Sheep" ===
In February 1981, The Bureau signed a deal with record label WEA and recorded their debut single, "Only For Sheep" / "The First One", with producer Pete Wingfield (who had produced Dexys' album Searching for the Young Soul Rebels) at London's Vineyard Studios. A video was recorded for "Only For Sheep" before the band left the UK for debut tour dates in the Netherlands and Belgium. Permanent trombone player Paul Taylor was recruited at the eleventh hour and joined the group for the dates. The first gig in Apeldoorn, the Netherlands, was reviewed in UK music paper NME and the second gig at the Paradiso Club, Amsterdam, was recorded for Dutch radio. "Only For Sheep" was released in March 1981 and was a hit in Australia, reaching No. 5, but failed to reach the UK Singles Chart.

On 12 March, The Bureau played their first British gig, a showcase, at Ronnie Scott's in London. At the end of March 1981, the band rehearsed and recorded new songs for their debut album including the follow-up single "Let Him Have It", inspired by the Derek Bentley/Christopher Craig case. In April 1981, The Bureau made a debut live TV appearance on BBC Midlands show Look Here and recorded four more songs for the debut album. They embarked on an extensive UK and Ireland tour beginning at the Forum Ballroom in Kentish Town, London, on 16 April and ending at The Lyceum on 17 May. The single "Let Him Have It" / "The Noose" was released in May 1981 and listed as "Record Of The Week" in UK music paper Record Mirror but failed to chart. In June 1981, The Bureau played a gig supporting Hazel O'Connor and The Specials at Butts Athletic Stadium in Coventry. Their performance was described as "triumphant" by music journalist Simon Tebbutt. They then supported The Pretenders on tours of the UK and America between July and September 1981. Some gigs included members of The Bureau appearing with The Pretenders for a cover of Jackie Wilson's "Higher And Higher", a recording of which appears on the CD reissue of The Pretenders album Pretenders II.

=== Albums ===
The album The Bureau was released in 1981, but only in Canada and Australia. The Canadian version of the album (catalogue number XWEA 58357) was eponymous but, in Australia, the album was titled Only For Sheep (catalogue number 600104). In Australia the song "Let Him Have It" was titled "Let Him Have It (Sweet Revenge)".

The Bureau embarked on a second UK tour in November and December 1981 sharing the bill with the Mo-dettes, and Roddy Radiation and The Tearjerkers. The tour was dubbed "The Good, The Bad And The Ugly Tour" and ended at The Venue, Victoria, London, on 23 December 1981. The band dissolved soon after completing the tour.

The album finally became available in the UK when it received a CD release in 2005. The CD includes extra tracks not available on the original release, including an eleven-track concert and the video for "Only For Sheep".

The band reunited to play two launch gigs in London and Birmingham in February 2005, prompting the members to write and rehearse new material. October 2008 saw the release of a second, new album in the UK entitled And Another Thing..., which was released through the band's website and promoted via live gigs in Newcastle, Birmingham and London, and an appearance on Jools Holland's BBC Radio 2 show.

=== Post-breakup ===
Talbot went on to enjoy greater success as the co-founder with Paul Weller of The Style Council, while Brown formed Flag with ex-Secret Affair guitarist Dave Cairns. His current band, Archie Brown and The Young Bucks, is based in Newcastle, with a catalogue of nine albums and a line-up of Brown (vocals, saxophone, guitar), Patrick Rafferty (vocals, accordion, guitar, lap steel guitar, keyboards), Ian Thompson (bass), Phil Screaton (lead guitar) and Neil Ramshaw (drums). Blythe teamed up with former colleague Big Jim Paterson in The TKO Horns. Pete Williams went on to form the band These Tender Virtues in the mid-1980s and, more recently, Baseheart.

During the early 2000s, Williams and Talbot joined Kevin Rowland in a reformed Dexys to record new material, but nothing was released at that time.

2011 saw the emergence of a new project, GI Blythe, featuring Geoff Blythe (saxophones) and Archie Brown (vocals), along with Big Jim Paterson (ex-Dexys Midnight Runners, trombone), Larry Baeder (guitars), Joe "Bearclaw" Burcaw (bass), Pete Levin (keyboards) and Crispin Taylor (drums). The band released a debut album entitled Lost In Space in January 2012. At the same time, Williams, Talbot, and Paterson were recording One Day I'm Going to Soar with Rowland and the new Dexys, which was released in June 2012.

Pete Williams also released a solo album, SEE, in January 2012 to critical acclaim; Richard Hawley guests on guitar along with Paul Taylor on trombone. Williams released Roughnecks and Roustabouts in March 2015 with guests Mick Talbot and Josie Lawrence.

Paul Taylor has been touring and recording with Roberto Pla and Snowboy & The Latin Section for decades and now also has a solo project, Trombone Poetry. He has published several poetry books with Redriff Press.

== Discography ==
=== Singles ===
- "Only for Sheep" / "The First One" (1981) (AUS No. 5)
- "Let Him Have It" / "The Noose" (1981)

=== Albums ===
- The Bureau / Only for Sheep (1981) (AUS No. 59)
- And Another Thing... (2008)
