= Miyumi =

- Gender: Female

Origin
- Origin: Japanese
- Region of origin: Japanese

Miyumi (みゆみ, ミユミ) is a Japanese feminine given name.

It may refer to:

== Fictional characters ==
- Miyumi, a character in Scooby-Doo! and the Samurai Sword

== Other ==
The Miyumi Project (lang|ja|MIYUMIプロジェクト), a blend of music with different ethnic backgrounds, highlighting contributions from Japanese taiko drumming in the framework of jazz music

Shuri Miyumi (海弓シュリ), Japanese voice actress surnamed Miyumi
