= Searching for the Young Soul Rebels =

Studio album by Dexys Midnight Runners
- Released: 11 July 1980
- Recorded: 1979 ("Geno"); April 1980
- Studios: Chipping Norton, Oxfordshire
- Genres: New wave, blue-eyed soul
- Length: 41:37
- Labels: EMI, Parlophone
- Producer: Pete Wingfield

Dexys Midnight Runners chronology
Searching for the Young Soul Rebels (1980)	Too-Rye-Ay (1982)

Singles from Searching for the Young Soul Rebels
- 1. "Geno" Released: 15 March 1980; 2. "There, There, My Dear" Released: June 1980

Searching for the Young Soul Rebels is the debut studio album by English band Dexys Midnight Runners, released on 11 July 1980, through Parlophone and EMI Records. Led by Kevin Rowland, the band formed in 1978 in Birmingham, England, and formed a strong live reputation before recording their first material. Recorded during April 1980, the album combines the aggressiveness of punk rock with soul music, particularly influenced by the Northern soul movement.

The album was preceded by and contains the hit-single "Geno", which topped the UK Singles Chart. It also contains two other charting singles: "Dance Stance" (re-recorded as "Burn It Down") and "There, There, My Dear" (which included the lyrics "I've been searching for the young soul rebels" that inspired the album's title). The album reached number 6 on the UK Albums Chart and is certified silver by the British Phonographic Industry. It has been widely acclaimed by music critics since its release and is included in 1001 Albums You Must Hear Before You Die.

== Background ==
In 1976, Kevin Rowland formed a punk band called the Killjoys, based in Birmingham, England, which gained minor success with the release of their single "Johnny Won't Get to Heaven"/"Naïve" in 1977. Kevin "Al" Archer joined in early 1978, but due to internal arguments and tension between Rowland and the rest of the group the band dissolved. On "a hot night in July 1978" Rowland decided to form a new band, which would eventually become Dexys Midnight Runners, telling Archer "I'm going to do what I really want to do: form a great group. We'll wear great clothes and make soulful music." Throughout July Rowland and Archer auditioned 30–40 people to join the group, the eventual band consisting of 8 members. Later that summer the band would create their name, after the drug Dexedrine which was used by fans of Northern soul, and began a rigorous rehearsing and writing schedule, practising for about 9 hours every day. In November 1978, the band entered the UK live circuit and gained a reputation for their strong performances, which included covers of classic soul songs and originals. Rowland and Archer employed a strict code of conduct, ruling out drinking or drug use before performances, and introduced many of the band members to activities such as shoplifting expeditions and bumping trains.

In 1979, Rowland turned down an offer to join Jerry Dammers' 2 Tone Records after supporting his band the Specials and signed to Oddball Records instead. In November that year, the band adopted their signature look for their early recordings, consisting of donkey jackets and watch caps. It was inspired by New York dockworkers, such as in the film On the Waterfront. After the release of their first single "Dance Stance" in December, which entered the charts and led to the band signing to EMI Records, the band underwent a nationwide tour titled Straight to the Heart in 1980. Their lineup would change slightly at this point, with John Jay being replaced by Bobby Ward who was later replaced by Andy "Stoker" Growcott on drums and Pete Saunders being replaced by Andy Leek on organ. The band released their next single, "Geno", on 15 March 1980, which peaked at number one on the UK Singles Chart.

== Recording ==
The band recorded Searching for the Young Soul Rebels over 12 days at Chipping Norton Recording Studios in Oxfordshire, England. It was produced by Pete Wingfield, who had previously recorded the hit single "Eighteen with a Bullet", of which Rowland was a fan. Organist Andy Leek left the group during the sessions, only appearing on two songs ("Geno", which was previously recorded, and "Thankfully Not Living in Yorkshire It Doesn't Apply"), leading to the return of Pete Saunders. "There, There, My Dear" features Rowland singing the main chorus of Lee Dorsey's "Everything I Do Gonh Be Funky (From Now On)" at the end of the track.

=== Theft ===
I sort of dived in the back of this car and just took off with police cars chasing us ... Being chased by police cars up the A40 at 90 miles per hour is not my idea of fun.

— "Big" Jim Paterson

During their time with EMI Records, the band consistently experienced troubles with their contract: upon their initial negotiations only three members of the group (Rowland, Archer and Geoffrey "Jeff" Blythe), called the "nucleus", were signed to the label, which caused a stir within the group. They were also only being paid 6% of the royalties, whereas most bands receive 10–12%. This led to Rowland threatening to steal the album from the studio and hold it ransom until their pay was increased, which EMI laughed at. However, on the last day of mixing the record, while Wingfield was out of the studio to get a cup of coffee, the members of the group locked the door to the studio, each taking a carton of magnetic tape and ran through the building to their getaway vehicle, a Morris Minor which belonged to Saunders' girlfriend, and drove to Rowland's parents' house in Birmingham. EMI demanded the tapes back but the band had already set off on their sell-out UK tour. The band gave the tapes back when EMI raised their pay to 9%, but they almost destroyed them by travelling through the London Underground, which could have demagnetized them and wiped everything.

== Composition ==
Searching for the Young Soul Rebels opens with the sound of radio static, from which snippets of "Smoke on the Water" by Deep Purple, "Holidays in the Sun" by Sex Pistols and "Rat Race" by the Specials can be heard. This is then cut off by shouts by Rowland and "Big" Jim Paterson, which are followed by "Burn It Down", a re-working of the band's first single "Dance Stance".

Mojo has summed up the sound of the album as "an energetic mix of pop, Northern soul and punkish attitude." The band intended to create a brassy sound mixed with the aggression and intensity of punk rock. The music mainly consists of up-beat soul music ("Tell Me When My Light Turns Green", "Geno", "Seven Days Too Long") inspired by labels such as Motown and Stax, and downbeat blues-jazz tunes ("I'm Just Looking", "I Couldn't Help It If I Tried", "Keep It"). "Seven Days Too Long" is a cover of the "Northern soul classic", originally recorded by Chuck Wood. Rowland's lyrics have been described as "a mixture of punchy bravado, deep disgust and a rather heroic flaunting of his insecurities, sobbed rather than sung," and concern subjects such as ignorance towards Irish people ("Burn It Down"), an open letter to the dishonest music scene ("There, There, My Dear") and a tribute to the soul singer Geno Washington ("Geno").

== Release ==
The album was released on 11 July 1980 and reached number 6 on the UK Albums Chart. It also charted on the New Zealand Music Chart for 21 weeks, peaking at number 11, and the Swedish Albums Chart for 4 weeks, peaking at number 31. Two weeks after its release the album was certified silver by the British Phonographic Industry. Two singles were released prior to the album: "Geno" was released on March 15, 1980, and reached number one on the UK Singles Chart and number 2 on the Irish Singles Chart. "There, There, My Dear" was released in June 1980 and reached number 7 on the UK chart. Their debut single "Dance Stance" released in November 1979 (originally through Oddball Records) was re-recorded for the album as "Burn It Down" and is therefore not the version on the album. It reached number 40 on the UK Singles Chart.

Just before the release of the album the band underwent a sell-out UK tour titled Intense Emotions Review, with support from comedian Keith Allen. After the album's release, a new Dexys single titled "Keep It Part Two (Inferiority Part One)", which was a reworking of the album track "Keep It" with new lyrics written by Rowland, was released in October 1980 but did not chart.

=== Reissues ===
Searching for the Young Soul Rebels has been reissued with bonus tracks three times. First, in 1996, the eleven tracks plus seven tracks from singles that Dexys had released on EMI were issued as part of an 18-song collection entitled It Was Like This; however, the two sides of Dexys' first single ("Dance Stance" b/w "I'm Just Looking") were included in the original, Bernie Rhodes-produced versions (with Bobby Ward on drums), not the re-recorded Wingfield-produced versions on the album. Then, a remastered edition of the album was released in 2000 for its 20th anniversary, including two additional tracks: the music videos for "Geno" and "There, There, My Dear". Most recently, a deluxe 30th Anniversary Special Edition was released in 2010 including a bonus disc of outtakes and demos, which includes all of the bonus tracks issued with It Was Like This (tracks 3–8 and 19 on the bonus disk) as well as additional BBC live and demo recordings.

=== Packaging ===
The album cover features a photograph of a 13-year-old Irish Catholic boy carrying his belongings after being forced from his home in Belfast, Northern Ireland because of civil unrest in 1971. The photo was included in the Evening Standard the next day and was picked up by the band nine years later. The boy later identified himself as Anthony O'Shaughnessy. He stated that "There were tensions simmering for about three days. People did not know what was going to happen. I thought it was a dream and in the morning everything would be okay, I don't even remember the photographer doing the picture." Upon the choice of the image Rowland explained "I wanted a picture of unrest. It could have been from anywhere but I was secretly glad that it was from Ireland." The original sleeve also contained an account of the band's history along with various phrases printed with the song titles, including quotes from Brendan Behan's book Borstal Boy and the Book of Psalms.

The figure on the left-hand side (with the long hair) is reputed to be Robert Bates, later a member of the Shankill Butchers.

== Reception ==
Retrospective professional ratings
Review scores
Source	Rating
AllMusic	4.5/5 stars
Christgau's Record Guide	B
The Irish Times	5/5 stars
Melody Maker	5/5 stars
Mojo	4/5 stars
NME	8/10
Pitchfork	8.9/10
Record Collector	5/5 stars
Select	5/5
Uncut	5/5 stars

Searching for the Young Soul Rebels was released to positive reviews from music critics. In NME, Danny Baker deemed it one of the "finest" albums of its era, while in Sounds, Alan Lewis applauded Dexys Midnight Runners for offering a modern spin on 1960s soul music. At the end of 1980, Melody Maker listed Searching for the Young Soul Rebels as one of the year's best albums, while NME ranked it the tenth best album of the year. Smash Hits reviewer David Hepworth, however, was dismissive of the record and stated that "potentially good songs are dragged down by mannered vocals and would-be epic arrangements", while in the United States, David Fricke of Rolling Stone found the band's take on soul music subpar and marred by Rowland's excessive "affectations". American critic Robert Christgau was somewhat more enthusiastic, writing, "There are horn interjections that make me laugh out loud at their perfectly timed wrong rightness, and with Kevin Rowland quavering through his deeply felt poesy and everybody else blaring away, I enjoy it in much the same way I enjoy a no wave band on a good night".

In the years following its release, Searching for the Young Soul Rebels has been widely acclaimed by critics. AllMusic critic Ned Raggett remarked that on the album, Rowland "takes a role that Morrissey would have in 1985 and Jarvis Cocker in 1995 – the unexpected but perfect voice to capture a time and moment in the U.K – the return of 'soul' to English rock music at the dawn of Thatcherism." Daryl Easlea of BBC Music wrote that "Young Soul Rebels – fierce, raging and passionate – remains one of the greatest debut albums of all time". In a retrospective review following the album's 2010 reissue, Graeme Thomson of Uncut concluded that "ultimately, the myth-making around Kevin Rowland tends to obscure the fact that he's been responsible for some truly soul-scorching music", and that "at 30 years of age, Searching for the Young Soul Rebels continues to burn." Tom Ewing, writing in Pitchfork, praised it as Dexys Midnight Runners' "tightest and most consistent" record, while Drowned in Sound's Neil Ashman called it "damned near perfect." In Mojo, Johnny Rogan called Searching for the Young Soul Rebels "the most incandescent and refreshing record" of 1980.

Searching for the Young Soul Rebels has since been included on critics' lists and reference books, including The Guardian's list of the "100 Best Albums Ever" (#93), Melody Maker's list of the "All Time Top 100 Albums" (#42), NME's list of the "100 Greatest British Albums Ever" (#16) and 1001 Albums You Must Hear Before You Die.

== Track listing ==
Side One
No.	Title	Writer(s)	Length
1.	"Burn It Down"	Kevin Rowland	4:21
2.	"Tell Me When My Light Turns Green"	Rowland	3:46
3.	"The Teams That Meet in Caffs"	Kevin Archer	4:08
4.	"I'm Just Looking"	Rowland, Geoffrey Blythe, Peter Saunders	4:41
5.	"Geno"	Rowland, Archer	3:31

Side Two
No.	Title	Writer(s)	Length
6.	"Seven Days Too Long"	J. R. Bailey, Vernon Harrell	2:43
7.	"I Couldn't Help If I Tried"	Rowland, Jim Paterson	4:14
8.	"Thankfully Not Living in Yorkshire It Doesn't Apply"	Rowland, Saunders	2:59
9.	"Keep It"	Archer, Blythe	3:59
10.	"Love Part One"	Rowland	1:12
11.	"There, There, My Dear"	Rowland, Archer	3:31

30th Anniversary Edition Bonus Disc
No.	Title	Writer(s)	Length
1.	"Dance Stance" (single)	Rowland	3:44
2.	"I'm Just Looking" ("Dance Stance" B-side)	Rowland, Blythe, Saunders	4:23
3.	"Breaking Down the Walls of Heartache" ("Geno" B-side)	Sandy Linzer, Denny Randell	3:24
4.	"The Horse" ("There, There, My Dear" B-side)	Jesse James	2:22
5.	"Keep It Part Two (Inferiority Part One)" (single)	Rowland, Archer	3:45
6.	"One Way Love" ("Keep It Part Two (Inferiority Part One)" B-side)	Bert Berns, Jerry Ragovoy	3:09
7.	"Plan B" (single)	Rowland, Paterson	2:37
8.	"Soul Finger" ("Plan B" B-side)	Ben Cauley, Carl Cunningham, James Alexander, Jimmy King, Phalon Jones, Ronnie Caldwell	2:12
9.	"Thankfully Not Living in Yorkshire It Doesn't Apply" (demo)	Rowland, Saunders	2:53
10.	"Hold On, I'm A Comin'" (demo)	Isaac Hayes, David Porter	4:18
11.	"Breaking Down the Walls of Heartache" (demo)	Linzer, Randall	3:36
12.	"The Horse" (demo)	James	2:40
13.	"I Couldn't Help If I Tried" (demo)	Rowland, Paterson	4:18
14.	"Geno" (Peel session recorded 26/2/80)	Rowland, Archer	3:29
15.	"Tell Me When My Light Turns Green" (Peel session recorded 26/2/80)	Rowland	3:15
16.	"The Horse" (Peel session recorded 26/2/80)	James	2:13
17.	"Breaking Down the Walls of Heartache" (Peel session recorded 26/2/80)	Linzer, Randell	3:29
18.	"Geno" (Kid Jensen BBC Radio 1 Session)	Rowland, Archer	3:26
19.	"Respect" (Kid Jensen BBC Radio 1 Session)	Otis Redding	3:35
20.	"Dance Stance" (Kid Jensen BBC Radio 1 Session)	Rowland	3:19
21.	"The Teams That Meet in Caffs" (Kid Jensen BBC Radio 1 Session)	Archer	3:56

== Charts ==
Chart (1980)	Peak position
Australian (Kent Music Report)	66

Chart (2026)	Peak position
Hungarian Physical Albums (MAHASZ)	26

== Personnel ==
Dexys Midnight Runners

- Kevin Rowland – vocals
- Kevin "Al" Archer – guitar, vocals, liner notes
- "Big" Jim Paterson – trombone
- Pete Williams – bass, vocals
- Geoffrey "Jeff" Blythe – saxophone
- Steve "Babyface" Spooner – alto saxophone
- Pete Saunders – organ, piano
- Andy "Stoker" Growcott – drums
- Andy Leek – organ on "Geno" plus 30th Anniversary bonus tracks "Breaking Down the Walls of Heartache" and "Respect"

Production

- Pete Wingfield – producer
- Barry Hammond – engineer
- Peter Barrett – artwork
- Tony Cousins – remastering (2000 re-release)
- Nigel Reeve – enhanced CD Design (2000 re-release)
