= General Public =

English rock band

- General Public in 1994, left to right: Ranking Roger and Dave Wakeling

Background information
- Origin: Birmingham, England
- Genres: New wave
- Years active: 1983–1987; 1994–1995
- Labels: I.R.S.; Epic
- Spinoff of: The Beat
- Past members: Dave Wakeling; Ranking Roger; Mickey Billingham; Horace Panter; Stoker; Mick Jones; Kevin White; Gianni Minardi; Mario Minardi; Michael Railton; Norman Jones; Wayne Lothian; Randy Jacobs; Thomas White; Dan Chase

General Public were an English new wave band, formed in Birmingham in 1983, by vocalists Dave Wakeling and Ranking Roger of the Beat, and which also included former members of Dexys Midnight Runners, the Specials, and the Clash. They are best remembered for their hits "Tenderness" (1984) and "I'll Take You There" (1994).

== Career ==
After the break-up of the Beat in 1983 (known as the English Beat in North America), vocalists Dave Wakeling and Ranking Roger decided to continue working together in a new venture. They joined up with keyboardist Mickey Billingham (Dexys Midnight Runners), guitarist Mick Jones (the Clash), bassist Horace Panter (the Specials) and drummer Stoker (Dexys Midnight Runners/the Bureau) to form a supergroup of the UK punk and ska scene. They named the band General Public and were rapidly signed to Virgin Records in the UK and I.R.S. Records in North America.

The band recorded and released the album All the Rage in 1984. Jones left General Public part way through the recording process, but he is listed in the album's inner sleeve credits as a group member (although he did not appear in any of the band photographs for the album cover). Jones' replacement, guitarist Kevin White, also played on the album and was also listed as an official group member. White's picture also appeared on the album's back cover.

In the UK, General Public had a minor hit with the track "General Public", which reached No. 60 in the UK singles chart in 1984. The single's B-side "Dishwasher" (an instrumental mix of "Burning Bright" from All The Rage) became a surprise Top 40 hit in the Netherlands, after its use as a closing theme tune to the pop radio show Avondspits.

Later in the year, the band fared even better in North America, where their second single "Tenderness" was a Top 30 hit in Canada (No. 11) and the US (No. 27). The song's success benefited from appearing in the John Hughes films Sixteen Candles (1984) and Weird Science (1985) from the time period, and it would later appear in Amy Heckerling's Clueless (1995) and in the horror film Devil's Due (2014). Meanwhile, another General Public song, "Taking the Day Off" was featured in Ferris Bueller's Day Off (1986).

For the follow-up album, White and Stoker were replaced by brothers Gianni and Mario Minardi on guitar and drums, respectively. Hand to Mouth was significantly less successful than their debut album, and the band dissolved soon after its release. The 1993 reissue of the album includes "Taking the Day Off" and other non-album songs and remixes.

Roger and Wakeling worked on various solo projects for the next few years, before reconstituting General Public in 1994 to perform a cover version of the Staple Singers' hit "I'll Take You There" for the Threesome film soundtrack. The new General Public line-up retained only vocalists Wakeling and Roger from previous incarnations; the vocal duo was now backed by Michael Railton (keyboards), Randy Jacobs (guitars), Wayne Lothian (bass), Thomas White (drums), and Norman Jones (percussion).

"I'll Take You There" was a Top 40 hit in the US and Canada and a minor hit in the UK (No. 73). Jacobs and White then left the group, and new drummer Dan Chase was brought in. The sextet released the album Rub It Better for Epic Records in 1995, recorded in the US with the aid of Jerry Harrison, the former keyboardist and guitarist for Talking Heads producing. Guests on the album included former bandmate Mick Jones, Saxa, Pato Banton, and Chris Spedding; ex-band members Horace Panter and Stoker also participated in the album's creation, co-writing one song apiece. (Stoker also received an "additional recording" credit.) The single "Rainy Days" met with limited success in the US, but fared better in some international markets, notably Brazil. Sales were less than earlier albums, however, and Roger became tired of traveling to America, and they soon broke up again.

Since 2004, Dave Wakeling has toured the US with a full backing band as the English Beat. They often perform General Public tracks.

"Ranking" Roger Charlery died at his home in Birmingham on 26 March 2019 at the age of 56.

== Discography ==
=== Studio albums ===
Year	Album details	Peak chart positions		Certifications (sales threshold)
Year	Album details	US	CAN	Certifications (sales threshold)
1984	All the Rage: First studio album; Release date: 28 January 1984; Label: I.R.S. Records	26	19	CAN: Gold
1986	Hand to Mouth: Second studio album; Release date: 1986; Label: I.R.S. Records	83	84	
1995	Rub It Better: Third studio album; Release date: 4 April 1995; Label: Epic Records	—	—	
"—" denotes released that did not chart

=== Compilation albums ===
Year	Album details
2002	Classic Masters: First compilation album; Release date: 26 January 2002; Label: Capitol Records

=== Singles ===
Year	Single	Peak chart positions										Album
Year	Single	UK	AUS	CAN	NL	NZ	US	US Dance	US Main	US Mod	GER	Album
1984	"General Public"	60	—	—	—	41	—	—	—	—	—	All the Rage
1984	"Dishwasher"	—	—	—	38	—	—	—	—	—	—	All the Rage
1984	"Tenderness"	95	50	11	—	—	27	15	39	—	—	All the Rage
1985	"Never You Done That"	—	—	—	—	—	105	13	—	—	—	All the Rage
1985	"Hot You're Cool"	—	—	—	—	—	—	16	—	—	—	All the Rage
1986	"Come Again"	—	—	—	—	—	—	—	—	—	—	Hand to Mouth
1986	"Faults and All"	—	—	—	—	—	—	—	—	—	—	Hand to Mouth
1986	"Too Much or Nothing"	—	—	83	—	—	—	21	—	—	—	Hand to Mouth
1986	"In Conversation"	—	—	—	—	—	—	23	—	—	—	Hand to Mouth
1994	"I'll Take You There"	73	—	7	—	8	22	1	—	6	71	Threesome (soundtrack)
1995	"Rainy Days"	—	—	—	—	—	93	—	—	40	—	Rub It Better
1995	"Warm Love"	—	—	—	—	—	—	—	—	—	—	Rub It Better
"—" denotes releases that did not chart

== See also ==
- List of Billboard number-one dance club songs
- List of artists who reached number one on the U.S. Dance Club Songs chart
