= There, There, My Dear =

1980 single by Dexys Midnight Runners

Single by Dexys Midnight Runners

from the album Searching for the Young Soul Rebels
- B-side: "The Horse"
- Released: June 1980
- Recorded: April 1980
- Studio: Chipping Norton, Oxfordshire, England
- Genre: Blue-eyed soul; new wave
- Length: 3:10
- Label: Late Night Feelings/EMI
- Songwriter(s): Kevin Rowland; Kevin Archer
- Producer(s): Pete Wingfield

Dexys Midnight Runners singles chronology
"Geno" (1980)	"There, There, My Dear" (1980)	"Keep It Part Two (Inferiority Part One)" (1980)

"There, There, My Dear" is a song by English pop band Dexys Midnight Runners, released in June 1980 as the second and final single from their debut album Searching for the Young Soul Rebels. It peaked at number 7 on the UK Singles Chart.

== Lyrics ==
The song is an open letter to someone called Robin, allegedly signifying dishonesty and insincerity within the music scene. The song begins with the writer questioning the fact that Robin says he is "anti-fashion", but continues to wear fashionable clothes. The writer then alludes to the fact that whilst Robin can quote numerous philosophical and artistic people he doesn't actually understand these works or quotes. The writer is implying that Robin is a poseur and a fake, questioning whether Robin actually likes and does some of the things he says. Whilst Robin is a "dumb, dumb patriot", ignoring all the corruption and in the music scene, the writer believes that "the only way to change things is to shoot men who arrange things". In an interview in 2001, Kevin Rowland said he wasn't proud of that lyric as "I don't feel that way now".

The title of the band's debut album was inspired by the lyrics "I've been searching for the young soul rebels". The writer is saying that amidst the discord of the music scene, with the likes of post-punk, ska, pop, disco, the writer wants to find harmony and integrity in all of this and Robin is someone who only likes what is cool and popular at that moment. On later releases of the album, the song ends with Rowland singing unaccompanied the chorus of the 1969 Lee Dorsey song "Everything I Do Gonh Be Funky (From Now On)".

Kevin Rowland later explained that "It's an angry song. In the lyrics, I'm addressing 'Robin,' but he was the personification of a certain type of middle-class musician in NME, quoting Kerouac and Burroughs and all these authors I'd never read.""

In the liner notes of Searching for the Young Soul Rebels, the song title is followed by the line "P.S. Old clothes do not make a tortured artist".

== Reception ==
Reviewing the song for Smash Hits, David Hepworth wrote "Dexy's go out on a limb with their crucial follow up, Kevin Rowland delivering the vocal from the very lip of chaos while the horns dig in and hold the rhythm down". The song "pays no attention to any kind of form and just weaves all over the shop; the only real hook is the way he rrrrolls his rrrrrs every now and again". Reviewing retrospectively for Freaky Trigger, Peter Baran wrote "Attacking pretension whilst being fantastically pretentious, looking for a new music by aping a type of soul which had drifted out. All of which is made palatable by this overwhelming force of personality and energetic drive that runs through There, There, My Dear". Stewart Mason for AllMusic wrote "The follow-up to the UK number one single "Geno," "There, There, My Dear" is an even better song, perhaps the best of Dexy's Midnight Runners' entire career", describing it as "even catchier and more soulful" and that "it's the lyrics that make the song".

== B-side ==
The B-side is a cover of "The Horse", an instrumental soul song written by Jesse James which was first released by Cliff Nobles and Company in 1968. Dexys Midnight Runner's cover is a sped up version that removes most of the original soul. Between 1979 and 1980, the band regularly used it as a show-opener.

== Charts ==
Chart (1980)	Peak position
UK Singles (OCC)	7
