= Tenderness (General Public song) =

1984 single by General Public

Single by General Public

from the album All the Rage
- B-side: "Limited Balance"
- Released: May 1984
- Recorded: 1983
- Genre: New wave; rock
- Length: 3:35
- Label: I.R.S.
- Songwriters: Mickey Billingham; Ranking Roger; Dave Wakeling

General Public singles chronology
| "Dishwasher" (1984) | "Tenderness" (1984) | "Never You Done That" (1984) |

Music video
- "Tenderness" on YouTube

"Tenderness" is a song by the English new wave band General Public, released as a single in May 1984 by I.R.S. Records from their debut studio album All the Rage (1984).

== Content ==
The song's lyrics tell about a man who really needs tenderness to feel like a man. It was one of the band's first singles. The single cover of the extended versions has a sentence reading "words like conviction can turn into a sentence".

== Charts ==
| Chart (1984–1985) | Peak position |
|---|---|
| Australia (Kent Music Report) | 50 |
| Canadian Singles Chart | 11 |
| UK singles chart | 95 |
| US Billboard Hot 100 | 27 |
| US Billboard Dance/Disco | 15 |
| US Billboard Top Rock Tracks | 39 |
