= The Decorators =

English post-punk band

- Origin: Acton, London, England
- Genres: Post-punk
- Years active: 1980–1984
- Labels: New Hormones, Red, Red Flame
- Past members: Michael Bevan; Johnny Gilani; Steve Sandor; Joe Sax; Allan Boroughs; Pete Saunders

The Decorators were an English post-punk band from Acton, London, England, formed in 1980. They released two albums before splitting up in 1984.

The initial line-up of the band was Michael Bevan (vocals, guitar), Johnny Gilani (guitar), Steve Sandor (bass), Joe Sax (saxophone), and Allan Boroughs (drums). They moved to a communal residence in London and released a couple of singles before attracting interest from Island Records, a deal falling through when Island's Andrew Lauder moved on to Demon Records. The band instead signed to Red Flame Records, and expanded to a six-piece with the addition of keyboard player Pete Saunders, fresh from Dexys Midnight Runners. After the "Strange One" single in June 1982, they released their debut album, Tablets, the following month, released by Virgin Records in France. This was followed in late 1983 with a second set, Rebel Songs. The band split up in 1984.

== Discography ==
=== Albums ===
- Tablets (1982), Red Flame
- Rebel Songs (1983), Red Flame (UK Indie No. 15)

=== Singles ===
- "Twilight View" (1980), New Hormones (UK Indie No. 46)
- "Pendulum and Swinge" (1981), Red
- "Strange One" (1982), Red Flame
- "Teenage Head" (12") (1984), Virgin France
