= Long Duk Dong =

Fictional character in Sixteen Candles

- Created by: John Hughes
- Portrayed by: Gedde Watanabe
- Film: Sixteen Candles (1984)

In-universe information
- Gender: Male
- Occupation: Foreign exchange student

Long Duk Dong is a fictional character who appears in Sixteen Candles, a 1984 American coming-of-age comedy film written and directed by John Hughes. Played by Japanese American actor Gedde Watanabe, the character is a Chinese foreign exchange student and a supporting character in the film set at a US suburban high school. The character has been called an offensive stereotype of Asian people.

== Fictional appearance ==
In Sixteen Candles (1984), Long Duk Dong (played by Gedde Watanabe) is a Chinese foreign exchange student who stays with the grandparents of the film's protagonist Samantha (played by Molly Ringwald). He appears accompanied by a gong sound. He practices his conversational English with others, has his hair parted down the middle as an "uncool" style, is mystified by American food, and calls himself "The Donger". Dong also finds a love interest in Marlene, an athletic and chesty young woman who is physically larger than him.

Susannah Gora, writing about Sixteen Candles, said, "The role of 'The Donger' is pure comedy; a gong sounds every time Dong enters a scene. With his thick accent and bumbled attempts at American catchphrases ('Whass happenin', haaht stuff?'), everything Long Duk Dong says and does is understandably offensive—but is also, admittedly, hilarious."

== Casting and performance ==
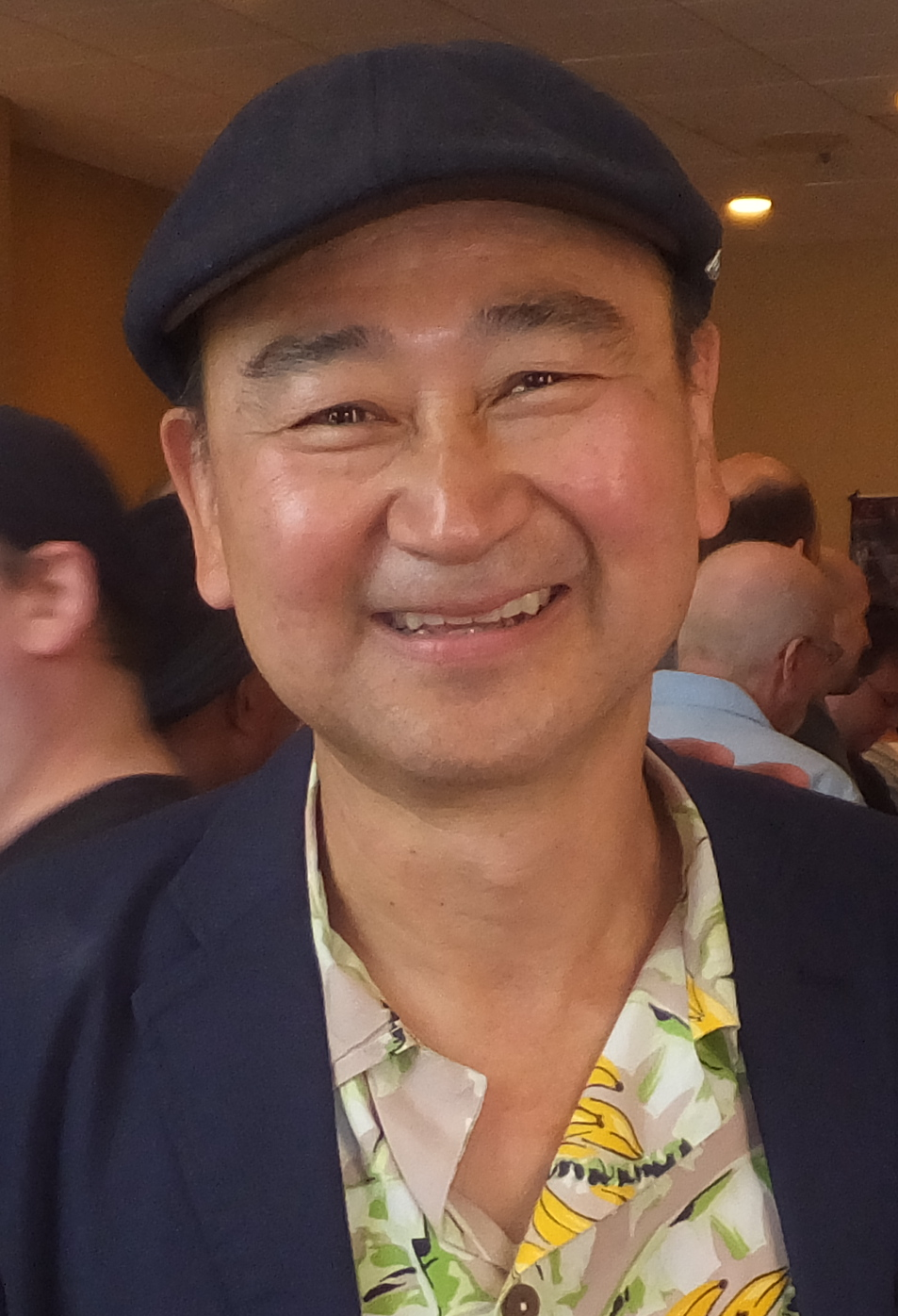
Gedde Watanabe in 2014, 30 years after the film's release

Actor Gedde Watanabe, a Japanese American from Ogden, Utah, was cast as Long Duk Dong in what was "his big Hollywood break". Before his audition, Watanabe had been in New York City performing for the musical Pacific Overtures at The Public Theater. His agent had informed him of the role as a foreign exchange student, and Watanabe decided to spend time "with a friend... who had a thick Korean accent" and "went to audition in character using [the] friend's accent". Watanabe recalled his portrayal attempt, "My training and my teachers had taught me that getting a character is about going for the intention. The Donger loved everything about America: the fun, the girls, the cars. So I didn't so much go for the jokes, but played to his excitement and enthusiasm." He auditioned for casting director Jackie Burch in-character, convincing her that he was from Korea and barely spoke English. Since Burch once taught deaf people, she tried to use sign language with him before he revealed that he was born in Ogden, Utah. Director John Hughes was also originally fooled. When Hughes first heard Watanabe speak with his normal American accent, he chuckled and said: “Boy, was I duped.”

For the exercise machine sequence, Watanabe had found the machine in the attic of the mansion that was rented to use as the protagonist's family's household. He said of his character's perspective of the machine, "He wouldn't have known what that thing was. he would've thought it was something that cleans rice or makes tofu." Watanabe showed the machine to Hughes, who ultimately filmed the sequence in which Long Duk Dong and his American girlfriend awkwardly ride the machine together.

Watanabe said some sequences with Long Duk Dong were left out of the final cut of the movie including a scene with him and his love interest in bed smoking and a rap performance at the school dance which got everyone dancing. Watanabe said the rap went something like: 'I like Coca-Cola, lady skate roller, rock 'n' rolla'". Watanabe expressed his hope that Universal would bring back Long Duk Dong's rap in a future release of the film.

Watanabe said he had "a great experience" making Sixteen Candles but recognized in retrospect that he was "a bit naive" about his role. He said, "I was making people laugh. I didn't realize how it was going to affect people." He said that "some time" after the film appeared in theaters, he learned how many people were upset about his character, recalling an experience at the Metropolitan Museum of Art when an Asian woman came up to him to complain about his portrayal. Watanabe said, "I kind of understood, and I reasoned with it. But at the same time, I didn't really think of it that way... Back then I didn't understand as much as I do now. I was a little bit ignorant, too, because I grew up in Utah. I had a very strange upbringing where I didn't experience that much racism. I just thought I was a part of everybody else."

After Sixteen Candles, Watanabe was cast in several accented roles but later mostly stopped using exaggerated Asian accents for his roles. The actor did recognize the popularity of his character and created voice mail messages in the voice of Long Duk Dong to auction off for charity.

== Contemporary critics' comments ==
Roger Ebert of the Chicago Sun-Times gave the film a positive review and said of the character, "There are a lot of effective performances in this movie, including... Gedde Watanabe as the exchange student (he elevates his role from a potentially offensive stereotype to high comedy)." Janet Maslin, writing for The New York Times, said, "When the movie goes too far, as it does with a stupid subplot about a sex-crazed Oriental exchange student or a running gag about a young woman in a body brace, at least it manages to bound back relatively soon thereafter."

== Legacy as Asian caricature ==
In a 2008 NPR segment, the character of Long Duk Dong was described as a "stain" on Hollywood's history of representing Asian characters. Critics noted that the character embodied numerous negative stereotypes, with his exaggerated accent, comedic incompetence, and gong-accompanied entrances contributing to a lasting cultural legacy of mockery for Asian-American men. Martin Wong and Eric Nakamura, co-founders of Giant Robot magazine, highlighted how "The Donger" became a common source of ridicule for Asian-American students during the 1980s, replacing earlier stereotypes like Bruce Lee with a more demeaning caricature.

In 2011, Susannah Gora, writing about the 1980s films of John Hughes, said, "The only significant non-white character in any of these films is also the basest caricature of all: Long Duk Dong... A heightened national sense of cultural sensitivity (or political correctness, depending on how you look at it) swept America and the movie studios in the early nineties, and so the 1980s were, in many ways, the last moment when racially questionable jokes regularly found their place in mainstream comedies." Actress Molly Ringwald, who starred in Sixteen Candles, wrote in 2018 that in the film, "Long Duk Dong... is a grotesque stereotype."

NPR revisited in 2015 the legacy of Long Duk Dong, describing the character as "cringeworthy" and emblematic of Hollywood's reliance on offensive Asian stereotypes. NPR's Kat Chow highlighted how the character reinforced tropes of Asian men as socially awkward, sexually inept, and perpetually foreign, further emphasizing the harm caused by such portrayals. Academic perspectives, such as those of Kent Ono and Vincent Pham, criticized the film's comedic framing of Long Duk Dong's gender and sexuality as aberrant, which contributed to the feminization of Asian-American men. Additionally, real-life implications of the character were felt by Asian-Americans, who reported being taunted with lines from the film, such as "Oh, sexy girlfriend."

Also in 2015, NPR again addressed the controversy of the character, recalling a 2001 one-page comic published by Asian-American graphic novelist Adrian Tomine called "The Donger and Me."

Catherine Driscoll, writing in Teen Film: A Critical Introduction, said Long Duk Dong in Sixteen Candles, Mr. Miyagi in The Karate Kid (1984), and Maria in West Side Story (1961) all represent "the homogenization of racial difference in US popular culture including teen film". Driscoll said of John Hughes, who directed Sixteen Candles and several other teen films, "Even critics who praise Hughes's sensitivity to adolescent drama acknowledge that his is a very partial picture of adolescence. The Hughes teen is white, suburban, and normatively middle-class... non-white characters appear in the background or are crass caricatures like Sixteen Candles' Long Duk Dong (Gedde Watanabe)."

Jamie Clarke, writing about the films of John Hughes in 2007, described Long Duk Dong as defying stereotypes, noting that "uberdork Long Duk Dong proves himself to be a party animal" and "by the night's end, the school's entire social strata will have turned upside down" with Samantha, the freshman geek, and also foreign exchange student Long Duk Dong finding romantic and social success.

Gedde Watanabe, reflecting on his portrayal in 2024, said that he did not initially perceive the role as offensive, attributing his perspective to the scarcity of roles for Asian actors at the time. While he acknowledged some problematic elements of the character, he emphasized the role's impact in sparking ongoing conversations about Asian representation in media and appreciated the evolving opportunities for more nuanced portrayals of Asian characters in Hollywood.

== In other media ==
A 1980s cover band based in Lexington, Kentucky calls itself Long Duk Dong after the character. Band founder Shan Justice said, "It's odd that a character that's not a primary character would have so much notability. But that one certainly did."

In the TV series Fresh Off the Boat's episode "Good Morning Orlando", in 2015, the specter of Long Duk Dong looms over Louis as he struggles with the responsibility of representing Chinese culture on a local talk show without perpetuating stereotypes.

== See also ==
- Portrayal of East Asians in American film and theater

== Bibliography ==
- Gora, Susannah (2011). You Couldn't Ignore Me If You Tried: The Brat Pack, John Hughes, and Their Impact on a Generation. Three Rivers Press. ISBN 978-0-307-71660-6.
