= Gedde Watanabe =

American actor (born 1955)

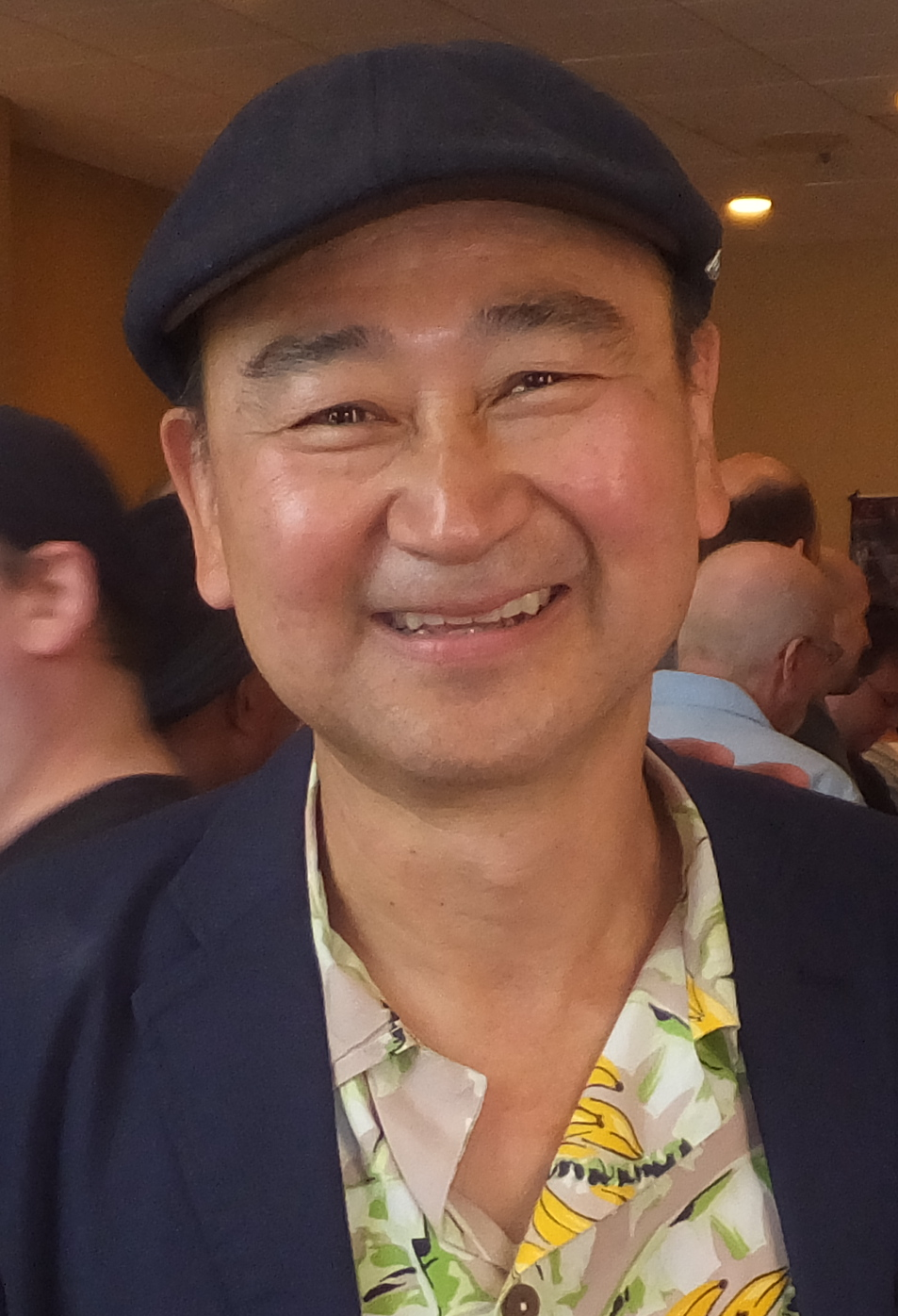
- Watanabe in 2014
- Born: Gary Watanabe; June 26, 1955 (age 71); Ogden, Utah, U.S.
- Education: American Conservatory Theater
- Occupation: Actor
- Years active: 1976–present

Gary "Gedde" Watanabe (/ˈɡɛdi ˌwɑːtəˈnɑːbi/; born June 26, 1955) is an American actor. He is known for voicing the character of Ling in the animated film Mulan (1998) and its sequel Mulan II (2004), as well as playing Long Duk Dong in the film Sixteen Candles (1984), Takahara "Kaz" Kazihiro in Gung Ho (1986), and Nurse Yosh Takata in the NBC medical drama ER from 1997 to 2003. He was also an original cast member of the Stephen Sondheim musical Pacific Overtures.

== Early life and education ==
Watanabe was born and raised in Ogden, Utah, in a Japanese-American family. His mother worked as a seamstress at the Utah Tailoring Company. He performed in several dramatic productions in high school, both acting and singing. After graduation, Watanabe relocated to San Francisco, where he worked as a street musician while honing his acting skills.

== Career ==
In 1976, Watanabe's first role was as a member of the original Broadway cast of Pacific Overtures, originating the roles of Priest, Girl, and The Boy. He has since appeared in a number of films and television series, the first of which was The Long Island Four in 1980.

Many of his roles are caricatured East Asians with heavy accents, though he himself does not speak Japanese.

Watanabe became well known for his role as Long Duk Dong in the film Sixteen Candles (1984). He had a starring role in both the film Gung Ho (1986) and its television spinoff. In the 1989 movie UHF starring "Weird Al" Yankovic, Watanabe co-starred as Kuni, a karate instructor and abusive host of a TV game show called Wheel of Fish. He later reprised this role on The Weird Al Show. Watanabe appeared on Sesame Street from 1988 to 1991 as Hiroshi and had a recurring role as gay nurse Yosh Takata on the television drama ER from 1997 to 2003. During the nineties, Watanabe studied acting at Theater Theater in Hollywood, California, with Chris Aable, who introduced him to fellow actors Jon Cedar and Steve Burton. He voiced various Japanese characters on the animated television comedy The Simpsons. In 1998, he voiced Ling in the Disney animated film Mulan and reprised the role for the 2004 direct-to-video sequel Mulan II and the 2005 video game Kingdom Hearts II.

== Personal life ==
While living as a gay man and in a relationship since 1986, Watanabe did not speak much about his sexuality.

It was not until receiving his role in the 2020 web series The Disappointments that Watanabe spoke of his life as a gay man on the record in a conversation with Disappointments co-stars Trevor LaPaglia and Rich Burns.

== Filmography ==
=== Film ===
Film performances
Year	Title	Role	Notes
1980	The Long Island Four	Unknown role	
1984	Sixteen Candles	Long Duk Dong	
1985	Volunteers	At Toon	
1986	Gung Ho	Oishi Kazihiro	
1986	Vamp	Duncan	
1989	UHF	Kuni	
1990	Gremlins 2: The New Batch	Mr. Katsuji	
1990	The Spring	Matty	
1995	Boys on the Side	Steve	
1995	Perfect Alibi	Detective Onoda	
1996	That Thing You Do!	Play-Tone Photographer	
1997	Nick and Jane	Enzo	
1997	Booty Call	Chan	Uncredited
1997	Psycho Sushi	Yoshi	
1998	Mulan	Ling	Voice
1998	Armageddon	Asian Tourist	Uncredited
1999	Guinevere	Ed	
1999	EDtv	Greg	
1999	The Wacky Adventures of Ronald McDonald: The Visitors from Outer Space	Karate Master	Voice, direct-to-video
1999	Frank in Five	Waiter	Short film
2002	Slackers	Japanese Proctor	
2002	Thank You, Good Night	Cafe Owner	
2004	On the Couch	Charlie	Short film
2004	Alfie	Wing	
2004	Mulan II	Ling	Voice, direct-to-video
2005	Two for the Money	Milton	
2007	Fortune Hunters	Mr. Yu	Short film
2007	Sunny & Share Love You	Eliza's Dad, the Doctor	
2008	The Onion Movie	James Nakatami	
2008	Forgetting Sarah Marshall	Hotel Manager	
2009	Not Forgotten	Agent Nakamura	
2009	Scooby-Doo! and the Samurai Sword	Kenji	Voice, direct-to-video
2009	All Ages Night	Dead Head Fred	
2012	Parental Guidance	Mr. Cheng	
2013	47 Ronin	Troupe Leader	
2017	The Last Word	Gardener	
2020	She Had It Coming	—N/a	Short film; director
2024	Kung Fu Panda 4	Badger Crime Boss	Voice
2024	Ultraman: Rising	Hayao Sato/Ultradad	Voice

=== Television ===
Television performances
Year	Title	Role	Notes
1976	Pacific Overtures	Priest / Girl / Boy	Television film
1978	Life at Stake	David Kootook	Episode: "Somewhere Between Cambridge Bay and Yellowknife"
1986–1987	Gung Ho	Kaz Kazuhiro	Main role
1987	The New Adventures of Beans Baxter	Ho Hum	Episode: "Beasn' Home Life Gets UGLI"
1988–1992	Sesame Street	Hiroshi	Recurring role
1989	Booker	Max	Episode: "Someone Stole Lucille"
1990	Grand	Taki Mifune	3 episodes
1990	Murphy Brown	Guru Prem	Episode: "The Bitch's Back"
1990	Newhart	Mr. Tagadachi	Episode: "The Last Newhart"
1990	On the Television	Various	2 episodes
1990–1991	Down Home	Tran	Main role
1991	Pacific Station	Ram Sha	Episode: "Operation!"
1992	Miss America: Behind the Crown	Takeo	Television film
1994	Count On Me	Unknown role	Television film
1995–1997	Happily Ever After: Fairy Tales for Every Child	Nuri / Emperor	Voice, 2 episodes
1996	Duckman	Unknown voice role	Episode: "The Mallardian Candidate"
1996	Mad About You	Speech Writer	Episode: "The Grant"
1996	Seinfeld	Mr. Oh	Episode: "The Checks"
1997	The Weird Al Show	Kuno	Episode: "Back to School"
1997–1999	The Simpsons	Cartoon Squid / Japanese Father / Japanese Man / Factory Foreman	Voice, 2 episodes
1997–2003	ER	Nurse Yosh Takata	Recurring role
1998–1999	Rugrats	Zack / Kangaroo	2 episodes
1999	Home Improvement	Nobo Nakamura	Episode: "Home Alone"
1999–2000	Batman Beyond	Dr. Suzuki / Principal	Voice, 2 episodes
2000	Secret Agent Man	Ling #2	Episode: "Uncle S.A.M."
2000	Sabrina the Teenage Witch	Kenji	Episode: "Welcome, Traveler"
2001	Jackie Chan Adventures	Gangster #1	Voice, episode: "Mother of All Battles"
2001	The Proud Family	Mr. Min	Voice, episode: "EZ Jackster"
2001	E! True Hollywood Story	Himself (Interviewee)	Episode: "Sixteen Candles"
2002	L.A. Law: The Movie	Cyril	Television film
2002	My Wife and Kids	Dr. Phil Ling	Episode: "Diary of a Mad Teen"
2002–2007	Kim Possible	Professor Bob Chen	Voice, 2 episodes
2003	What's New, Scooby-Doo?	Vincent Wong	Voice, episode: "Lights! Camera! Mayhem!"
2003	Whatever Happened to... Robot Jones?	James / Bear / Co-worker	Voice, 3 episodes
2003	I Love the '80s Strikes Back	Himself (Interviewee)	Documentary (10 episodes)
2005	Everwood	Art	Episode: "Oh, the Places You'll Go"
2005–2007	All Grown Up!	Nar-do / Nar-Do, Cyber Clause	Voice, 2 episodes
2006	Model Family	Terrence	TV Short
2006	Family Guy	Long Duk Dong	Voice, episode: "Mother Tucker"
2008	American Dad!	Chicken Hatchery Manager	Voice, episode: "Pulling Double Booty"
2010	Proposition 8 Trial Re-Enactment	Hak-Sing William Tam	TV documentary
2012	The Seven Year Hitch	Mr. Fujimura	Television film
2014–2017	Bravest Warriors	Hamster Mitch / Tourist Alien	Voice, 3 episodes
2016	Pickle and Peanut	Additional voices	Episode: "90s Adventure Bear / Parking Lot Carnival"
2019	Puppy Dog Pals	Reo	Voice, episode: "Land of the Rising Pup"
2019	Perfect Harmony	Glenn	Episode: "Pilot"
2020	The Disappointments	Gary Chen	Recurring role
2021	Call Me Kat	Henry	Episode: "Eggs"
2021	The Sex Lives of College Girls	Professor Harpin	Episode: "Parents Weekend"

=== Video games ===
Video game credits
Year	Title	Voice role	Notes
1998	Disney's Animated Storybook: Mulan	Ling	
1998	Mulan Story Studio	Ling	
2005	Kingdom Hearts II	Ling	English version
2007	Kingdom Hearts II: Final Mix+	Ling	English version

== Stage ==
Stage performances
Year	Title	Role	Notes	Refs.
1976	Pacific Overtures	Boy, Girl, Priest, Sailor and Townsperson, Proscenium Servant	Broadway debut	
1982	Poor Little Lambs	Itsu Yoshiro		
1994	The Good Person of Setzuan	Water Seller		
2001	A Funny Thing Happened on the Way to the Forum	Pseudolus		
2008	Pippin	Grandmother Berthe		
2009	Ixnay	Tadashi Ozaki		
2016	La Cage aux Folles	Albin		
2016	The Fantasticks	Hucklebee		
