= Serious Drinking =

English Punkband

- Origin: Norwich, England
- Genre: Punk rock
- Years active: 1981–mid-1980s, and intermittently since
- Labels: Upright, Musical Tragedies, Worker's Playtime, Damaged Goods
- Members: Martin Ling; Eugene Rodgers; Andy Hearnshaw; Cathal Kennedy; Pete Saunders; Lance Dunlop

Serious Drinking were an English humorous punk rock band from Norwich, England, whose lyrical themes often covered football and drinking.

== History ==
The band formed in February 1981, taking their name from a Sounds headline to an interview with The Cockney Rejects, with most members having met at the University of East Anglia. Band members were Martin Ling (vocals), Eugene Rodgers (vocals), Andy Hearnshaw (guitar, formerly of The Farmer's Boys), Jem Moore (bass), Pete Saunders (keyboards) also known from Dexys Midnight Runners and Lance Dunlop (drums). Their debut EP, Love on the Terraces (produced by Madness's Mark Bedford) reached number 9 on the UK Indie Chart in 1982, with follow-up "Hangover" reaching number 4 the following year. Debut album The Revolution Starts at Closing Time also reached number 4, and was followed up in 1984 by a second album, They May Be Drinkers Robin, But They're Still Human Beings. After another single, "Country Girl Became Drugs and Sex Punk", Moore and Dunlop left the band. The new line-up continued with sporadic gigs.

The band were firm favourites of John Peel and recorded four sessions for his BBC Radio 1 show. "Love on the Terraces" also reached number 38 in the 1982 Festive Fifty.

A compilation of their finest moments, Stranger Than Tannadice – The Hits, Misses and Own Goals was released in 1990 on the Worker's Playtime label, to coincide with the 1990 World Cup, with a couple of singles also emerging in the 1990s.

== Discography ==
Chart placings shown are from the UK Indie Chart.

=== Singles/EPs ===
- Love on the Terraces EP (1982) Upright (number 9)
- "Hangover" (1983) Upright (number 4)
- "Country Girl Became Drugs and Sex Punk" (1984) Upright (number 8)
- "Red Skies Over Wembley" (1993) Musical Tragedies
- "Back Home 1966" (1996) Damaged Goods

=== Albums ===
- The Revolution Starts at Closing Time (1983) Upright (number 4)
- They May Be Drinkers Robin, But They're Still Human Beings (1984) Upright (number 16)
- Stranger Than Tannadice – The Hits, Misses and Own Goals (1990) Worker's Playtime

== Members ==
Eugene Rodgers, Martin Ling, Jem Moore, Andy Hearnshaw, Lance Dunlop, Glenville Williams, Karen Yarnell, Cathal Kennedy, Pete Saunders, Simon Charterton, Terry Edwards, Richard Sheldrake.
