= Sixteen Candles =

1984 film by John Hughes

- Theatrical release poster
- Directed by: John Hughes
- Written by: John Hughes
- Produced by: Hilton A. Green; Michelle Manning; Ned Tanen
- Starring: Molly Ringwald; Michael Schoeffling; Paul Dooley; Justin Henry; Anthony Michael Hall
- Cinematography: Bobby Byrne
- Edited by: Edward Warschillka
- Music by: Ira Newborn
- Production companies: Universal Pictures; Channel Productions
- Distributed by: Universal Pictures
- Release date: May 4, 1984
- Running time: 93 minutes
- Country: United States
- Language: English
- Budget: $6.5 million
- Box office: $23.6 million

Sixteen Candles is a 1984 American coming-of-age teen comedy film starring Molly Ringwald, Michael Schoeffling, and Anthony Michael Hall. Written and directed by John Hughes in his directorial debut, it was the first in a string of films Hughes would direct, centering on teenage life. The film follows newly 16-year-old Samantha Baker (Ringwald), who deals with a seemingly unrequited crush on high school senior Jake Ryan (Schoeffling) while also being pursued by freshman Ted "The Geek" Farmer (Hall).

Hughes began development on Sixteen Candles in 1982, and after signing a three-picture deal with Universal Pictures, he chose the cast of the film and began filming in July 1983. Initially receiving an R rating from the Motion Picture Association of America (MPAA), Hughes successfully lobbied for the film to be released with a PG rating.

Sixteen Candles was theatrically released by Universal Pictures in the United States on May 4, 1984. The film received generally positive reviews from critics, who particularly praised Ringwald's performance, and was a box office success, earning $23.6 million against a $6.5 million budget.

Retrospectively considered to be one of Hughes's best films, Sixteen Candles helped launch the careers of Ringwald, Schoeffling, and Hall. A television series from Peacock based on the film entered development in 2022.

== Plot ==
In suburban Chicago, high school sophomore Samantha "Sam" Baker is hopeful her 16th birthday is the beginning of a new year, but shocked when her family forgets the occasion because her older, beautiful, self-absorbed sister Ginny is getting married the next day.

At school, Sam fills out a friend's sex quiz where she reveals her crush on senior classmate Jake Ryan. Meanwhile, Jake, having noticed how Sam looks at him, asks his friend Rock about her. Rock dismisses her as immature, and reminds him he is already in a relationship with popular girl, Caroline. Jake mentions that he is frustrated by Caroline's partying. On the bus ride home, Sam fends off flirtations from geeky freshman Ted.

At home, Sam's day gets worse when she discovers she must sleep on the sofa because her grandparents, who are traveling with a foreign exchange student named Long Duk Dong, are staying in her bedroom while in town for the wedding. She is further upset when her grandparents do not remember her birthday and have Dong go with her to a dance at school that night.

At the dance, Sam pines for Jake while Dong has attracted the strong jock, Marlene. Ted, trying to impress his friends Bryce and Wease, tries to dance with Sam, who runs off in tears. In an effort to salvage his reputation with the geeks, Ted bets Bryce and Wease floppy disks he will get physical with Sam before the dance ends. As proof, Bryce and Wease demand Sam's underwear. Jake asks Ted about Sam, having seen them dancing.

Ted apologizes to Sam, who opens up about her family forgetting her birthday and her crush on Jake. Ted tells her that Jake asked about her and Sam is shocked and asks what Ted thinks she should do. Despite his interest in Sam, Ted encourages her to talk to Jake, and she agrees. Before she leaves, he gets her underwear to win his bet and he, Bryce, and Wease charge other freshmen boys a dollar to see it. Sam tries to approach Jake, but loses her nerve. Jake and Caroline leave the dance, leaving Sam thinking Jake does not like her, and vice-versa.

At Jake's house, Caroline and friends have started a wild party. Jake, angry with Caroline, retreats to his bedroom and tries calling Sam, but her grandparents answer, and tell him that Sam is not interested. Following the party, Jake is furious at the damage. He finds Ted trapped under a table. Ted tells Jake that Sam is interested in him and Jake confesses he has lost interest in Caroline. He takes Sam's underwear from Ted and, in exchange, lets Ted take a drunken Caroline home in his father's Rolls-Royce Corniche. To further impress the geeks, Ted stops at Bryce and Wease's house to get Wease to take a picture of him with Caroline in the expensive car, but the picture only reveals the top of Ted's head.

Sam's father apologizes for forgetting her birthday, and tells her that if Jake does not see how wonderful she is, then he is not worth her time. She lies on the couch thinking of Jake, not knowing he is thinking of her. The next morning, Sam's mother apologizes to her and everyone heads to church for the wedding. Jake arrives at Sam's house, where a hungover Dong miscommunicates that Sam is getting married. Jake finds Caroline and Ted making out in the back of his dad's banged-up car: Jake and Caroline break up amicably. Jake surprises Sam at the church after the wedding and invites her to his house. Jake gives Sam her underwear, and a birthday cake with 16 candles. He tells her to make a wish and she says it already came true. They kiss.

== Cast ==
- Molly Ringwald as Samantha "Sam" Baker
- Michael Schoeffling as Jake Ryan
- Anthony Michael Hall as Farmer Ted / The Geek
- Haviland Morris as Caroline Mulford
- Gedde Watanabe as Long Duk Dong
- Paul Dooley as Jim Baker
- Carlin Glynn as Brenda Baker
- Blanche Baker as Ginny Baker
- Justin Henry as Mike Baker
- Edward Andrews as Grandpa Howard Baker
- Billie Bird as Grandma Dorothy Baker
- Carole Cook as Grandma Helen
- Max Showalter as Grandpa Fred
- Liane Curtis as Randy
- John Cusack as Bryce
- Darren Harris as Cliff "Wease"
- Deborah Pollack as Marlene "Lumberjack"
- Joan Cusack as Geek Girl
- Brian Doyle-Murray as Reverend
- Jami Gertz as Robin
- Tony Longo as Rock
- John Kapelos as Rudy Ryszczyk
- Zelda Rubinstein as Organist

== Production ==
=== Development ===
John Hughes originally wrote Sixteen Candles in 1982 as a low-budget production which A&M Films agreed to finance for $1 million. The film went into turnaround, but Hughes attracted more interest in his screenplays after writing the successful film National Lampoon's Vacation (1983). After Hughes was fired from his next film Mr. Mom (1983), he decided to resume pre-production on Sixteen Candles as his directorial debut as he felt it had more commercial appeal to his teenage target audience than his other planned film The Breakfast Club (1985). After Hughes was rehired on Mr. Mom, Ned Tanen greenlit both films at Universal Pictures under a three-year $30 million contract on the condition that Hughes release Sixteen Candles first.

=== Casting ===
Hughes had asked his agent for headshots of young actresses, and among those he received were those of Robin Wright, Molly Ringwald and Ally Sheedy. Sheedy had auditioned for the role of Sam, but was dropped because Hughes thought Ringwald was more fitting for the role. He called her a year later to give her a role in The Breakfast Club. Inspired by Ringwald's appearance, he put the photo up over his desk and wrote the film just over a weekend with her in mind for the lead role.

For the male lead in the film, it had come down to Schoeffling and Viggo Mortensen. Ringwald pursued Mortensen to get the role. Emilio Estevez also auditioned for Jake. For the part of Ted, Hughes saw a number of actors for the role including Jim Carrey, Jon Cryer, Keith Coogan and Ralph Macchio. "Every single kid who came in to read for the part... did the whole, stereotyped high school nerd thing. You know—thick glasses, ball point pens in the pocket, white socks. But when Michael came in he played it straight, like a real human being. I knew right at that moment that I'd found my geek." Paul Dooley initially turned down the role of Sam's father as he was in it initially for two or three minutes and the last two or three minutes; finally, Hughes called and told him he wrote the scene in the middle of the film so that he will be in the film and he accepted it.

=== Filming ===
Principal photography began on July 11, 1983. Sixteen Candles was filmed primarily in and around the Chicago North Shore suburban communities of Evanston, Skokie, and Highland Park, Illinois during the summer of 1983, when leads Ringwald and Hall were 15 years old. Most of the exterior scenes and some of the interior scenes were filmed at Niles East High School, close to downtown Skokie, the setting for Hall's driving the Rolls-Royce. A cafeteria scene and a gym scene were filmed at Niles North High School. The auto shop scene was filmed at Niles East High School in the auto shop. The Baker house is located at 3022 Payne Street in Evanston. The church (Glencoe Union Church at 263 Park Avenue) and parking lot where the final scenes take place are in Glencoe. The Motion Picture Association of America initially rated the film R, but Hughes won an appeal for it to be released as PG.

== Soundtrack and songs ==
Sixteen Candles

Soundtrack album by various artists
- Released: 1984
- Genres: Rock; new wave
- Length: 17:28
- Label: MCA
- Producers: Jimmy Iovine; Ira Newborn; John Cale; Alex Sadkin

Side 1
No.	Title	Performed By	Length
1.	"16 Candles"	Stray Cats	2:52
2.	"Hang Up the Phone"	Annie Golden	2:59
3.	"Geek Boogie"	Ira Newborn & the Geeks	2:48

Side 2
No.	Title	Performed By	Length
1.	"Gloria"	Patti Smith	5:54
2.	"If You Were Here"	Thompson Twins	2:55

The original soundtrack was released as a specially priced mini album containing only 5 songs. However, the movie actually featured an extensive selection of over 30 songs. Songs from the movie that were not included on the soundtrack EP are as follows:

- "Snowballed" – AC/DC
- "Today I Met the Boy I'm Gonna Marry" – Darlene Love
- "Love of the Common People" – Paul Young
- "Kajagoogoo" (Main Title Song) – Kajagoogoo
- "Happy Birthday" – Altered Images
- "Kazooed on Klassics" – Temple City Kazoo Orchestra
- "Dragnet" – Ray Anthony and His Orchestra
- "Rumours in the Air" – Night Ranger
- "Filene" – Ira Newborn (knockoff of Madness' Our House)
- "Peter Gunn" – Ray Anthony and His Orchestra
- "True" – Spandau Ballet
- "Wild Sex (In the Working Class)" – Oingo Boingo
- "Little Bitch" – The Specials
- "Growing Pains" – Tim Finn
- "When It Started to Begin" – Nick Heyward
- "Lenny" – Stevie Ray Vaughan
- "Whistle Down the Wind" – Nick Heyward
- "Ring Me Up" – The Divinyls
- "Love Theme from The Godfather" – Carlo Savina (conductor)
- "Turning Japanese" – The Vapors
- "Rev-Up" – The Revillos
- "Farmer John" – The Premiers
- "Theme from New York, New York" – Frank Sinatra
- "Young Guns (Go for It)" – Wham!
- "Rebel Yell" – Billy Idol
- "Lohengrin Wedding March" – Bavarian Staatsoper Munich Chorus and Orchestra
- "Young Americans" – David Bowie
- "Tenderness" – General Public

== Home media ==
Pre-2003 releases of the film featured a re-scored soundtrack due to rights issues. This wasn't until 2003 when the film was released on DVD with the original theatrical soundtrack intact albeit remixed in 5.1. In 2008, the film was again released on DVD as a "Flashback Edition" with a new featurette titled "Celebrating Sixteen Candles".

In 2012, the film was released on Blu-ray for the first time as part of Universal's 100th Anniversary with the 2008 featurette carried over, along with two new features highlighting the impact of Universal Studios: "The 80s" and "Unforgettable Characters".

In 2019, Universal re-released the film on Blu-ray in a digipak highlighting its 35th anniversary. The disc was the same 2012 release with nothing new added. In that same year, Arrow Video announced their release with a new 4K restoration.

== Reception ==
=== Box office ===
In its opening weekend the film grossed $4,461,520 in 1,240 theaters in the United States and Canada, ranking second. By the end of its run, Sixteen Candles grossed $23,686,027 against a budget of $6.5 million.

=== Critical response ===
Review aggregator website Rotten Tomatoes reported that 81% of critics gave it a positive rating, based on 43 reviews with an average rating of 7.1/10. The website's critical consensus reads: "Significantly more mature than the teen raunch comedies that defined the era, Sixteen Candles is shot with compassion and clear respect for its characters and their hang-ups". Metacritic gave the film a score of 61 based on 11 reviews, indicating "generally favorable reviews". Ringwald's performance was especially praised; Variety called her "engaging and credible" while Roger Ebert wrote that she "provides a perfect center for the story" in "a sweet and funny movie".

Janet Maslin of The New York Times called the film "a cuter and better-natured teen comedy than most, with the kinds of occasional lapses in taste that probably can't hurt it in the circles for which it is intended. The middle of the film wastes time on a bit more house-wrecking and car-crashing than is absolutely necessary, and there are some notably unfunny ethnic jokes. But most of the movie is cheerful and light, showcasing Mr. Hughes's knack for remembering all those aspects of middle-class American adolescent behavior that anyone else might want to forget."

Gene Siskel of the Chicago Tribune gave the film three-and-a-half stars out of four and called it "the best teenage comedy since last year's Risky Business", saying it was "certain to draw a lot of laughs, but the guess here is that it also will offer comfort to young girls and boys who feel awkward. And comfort and moments of recognition are in short supply in teenage movies, which often portray a world of violence and sexual mastery that is a lie."

Pauline Kael wrote in The New Yorker, "It doesn't amount to much, and it's certainly not to be confused with a work of art or a work of any depth, but the young writer-director John Hughes has a knack for making you like the high-school age characters better each time you hear them talk." Sheila Benson of the Los Angeles Times stated that "Vacation worked, for all its raunchiness. Sixteen Candles' mixture of the sympathetic and the synthetic, the raucous and the racist, doesn't. At least not for me ... it flails about, substituting chaos and raunchy language for any semblance of wit."

Gary Arnold of The Washington Post wrote, "Hughes isn't vigilant or deft enough to prevent the dramatic focus of attention from shifting at about the halfway point; he can't quite finesse the letdown that sets in when the engaging teen-age heroine, Samantha, delightfully embodied by Molly Ringwald, is allowed to become almost a subsidiary character in the second half of the story. Nevertheless, Sixteen Candles blends an idiosyncratic screwball imagination with a flair for updated domestic comedy and scenes of intimate, quirkily affectionate character interplay."

Sixteen Candles is retrospectively considered to be one of Hughes' best films.

=== Criticism ===
A 1984 review in The New York Times criticized the character of Long Duk Dong for being "unfunny" and a "potentially offensive stereotype" of Asian people. In 2008, Alison MacAdam of NPR wrote, "To some viewers, he represents one of the most offensive Asian stereotypes Hollywood ever gave America." Asian Americans have complained that they were taunted with quotes of his stilted-English lines. At the time of the film's release, Gedde Watanabe defended the character of Dong as being distinct from "submissive, smart" stereotypes of Asians at the time. Hughes argued that he was parodying foreign exchange students and their American host families in general rather than foreigners or Asians specifically.

In a 2009 article published in Salon, Amy Benfer considers whether the film directly condones date rape even though no sexual activity is established, consensual or otherwise. After the party scene, Jake tells Ted that his girlfriend Caroline is "in the bedroom right now, passed out cold. I could violate her ten different ways if I wanted to." He encourages Ted to drive her home saying, "She's so blitzed she won't know the difference." When Caroline and Ted wake up next to each other in the car, Caroline says she's fairly certain they had sex though neither of them remember it. Benfer writes, "The scene only works because people were stupid about date rape at the time. Even in a randy teen comedy, you would never see two sympathetic male characters conspiring to take advantage of a drunk chick these days."

Author Anthony C. Bleach has argued that one possibility for Caroline's emotional and physical ruin in the film "might be that she is unappreciative of (or unreflective about) her class position", adding that, "What happens to Caroline in the narrative, whether her sloppy drunkenness, her scalping, or the potential for sexual coercion, seems to be both a projection of Samantha's desire to acquire Jake and become his girlfriend and a project of the film's desire to somehow harm the upper class."

=== Awards ===
In December 1984, Ringwald and Hall both won Young Artist Awards as "Best Young Actress in a Motion Picture" and "Best Young Actor in a Motion Picture" for their roles in the film, respectively becoming the first and only juvenile performers in the history of the Young Artist Awards to win the Best Leading Actress and Best Leading Actor awards for the same film (a distinction the film still retains as of 2025). The movie is ranked number 8 on Entertainment Weekly's list of "The 50 Best High School Movies".

== Proposed sequel ==
In 2003, USA Network was reportedly developing a sequel to the film produced by Buffy Shutt and Kathy Jones. In 2005, Ringwald was said to be producing a sequel after having turned down previous offers. "I couldn't see how it would work. Now, it seems right."

By 2008, Ringwald was campaigning for the sequel, but said she was uncomfortable doing the film without the involvement of Hughes who, at that point, was not interested. Hughes died in 2009.

In March 2022, it was announced that Peacock was developing a comedy series titled 15 Candles, described as a reimagining of the film while focusing on four Latina leads. Selena Gomez, Tanya Saracho, and Gabriela Revilla Lugo are credited as executive producers. The project aims to pay homage to Sixteen Candles while introducing a fresh perspective and storylines.
