= The Blue Ox Babes =

- Origin: The Midlands, England
- Genres: Pop, pop rock
- Years active: 1981–1988
- Label: Go! Discs
- Past members: Kevin Archer; Yasmin Saleh; Andy Leek; Helen O'Hara; Pete Wain; Nick Smith; Ian Pettitt; Steve 'Brennan' Shaw; Steve Wynne

The Blue Ox Babes were an English pop group, formed in early 1981 by former Dexys Midnight Runners guitarist Kevin 'Al' Archer, together with his girlfriend Yasmin Saleh, guitarist Nick Bache and former Dexys keyboard player Andy Leek. Archer was keen to mix the soul sounds of his previous group with folk styles. To this end he recruited fiddle player Helen O'Hara to play on demo tapes of the new songs he had written. When former colleague Kevin Rowland heard these demo tapes, he invited O'Hara to join Dexys, and adopted a similarly folk-influenced sound for his own group.

By the time the Blue Ox Babes finally released their debut single "There's No Deceiving You" on Go! Discs in 1988, the line-up consisted of Archer (guitar and vocals), Saleh (backing vocals), Pete Wain (piano), Nick Smith (saxophone), Ian Pettitt (drums), former Dexys members Steve 'Brennan' Shaw (fiddle), and Steve Wynne (bass).

"There's No Deceiving You" was only a minor chart entry, peaking at No. 94 in the UK. Two other singles, "Apples and Oranges" and "Walking on the Line", were released but did not chart. A planned album Apples & Oranges was recorded by the group but was shelved, and the Blue Ox Babes broke up shortly thereafter. In 2009, a CD of Apples & Oranges was finally released, containing all their recordings for Go! Discs, through Cherry Red Records. The package includes all their singles plus many unreleased songs, and several additional demos were also made available as downloads.

== Members ==
- Kevin Archer — guitar, vocals (1981–88)
- Yasmin Saleh — vocals (1981–88)
- Nick Bache — guitar (1981–82)
- Andy Leek — keyboards (1981–82)
- Helen O'Hara — fiddle (1981–82)
- Corin Winfield — bass (1981)
- Pete Williams — bass (1982)
- Pete Wain — piano (1988)
- Nick Smith — saxophone (1988)
- Ian Pettitt — drums (1981–88)
- Steve 'Brennan' Shaw — fiddle (1988)
- Steve Wynne — bass (1988)

== Discography ==
=== Albums ===
- Apples & Oranges (recorded 1988, issued 2009)

=== Singles ===
- "There's No Deceiving You"/"The Last Detail"/"Take Me to the River" (1988) - UK #94
- "Apples and Oranges"/"Pray Lucky"/"Yes Let's"/"Russia in Winter" (1988)
- "Walking on the Line"/"Four Golden Tongues Talk"/"What Does Anybody Ever Think About"/"Thought as Much" (1988)
