= Ranking Roger =

British singer (1963–2019)

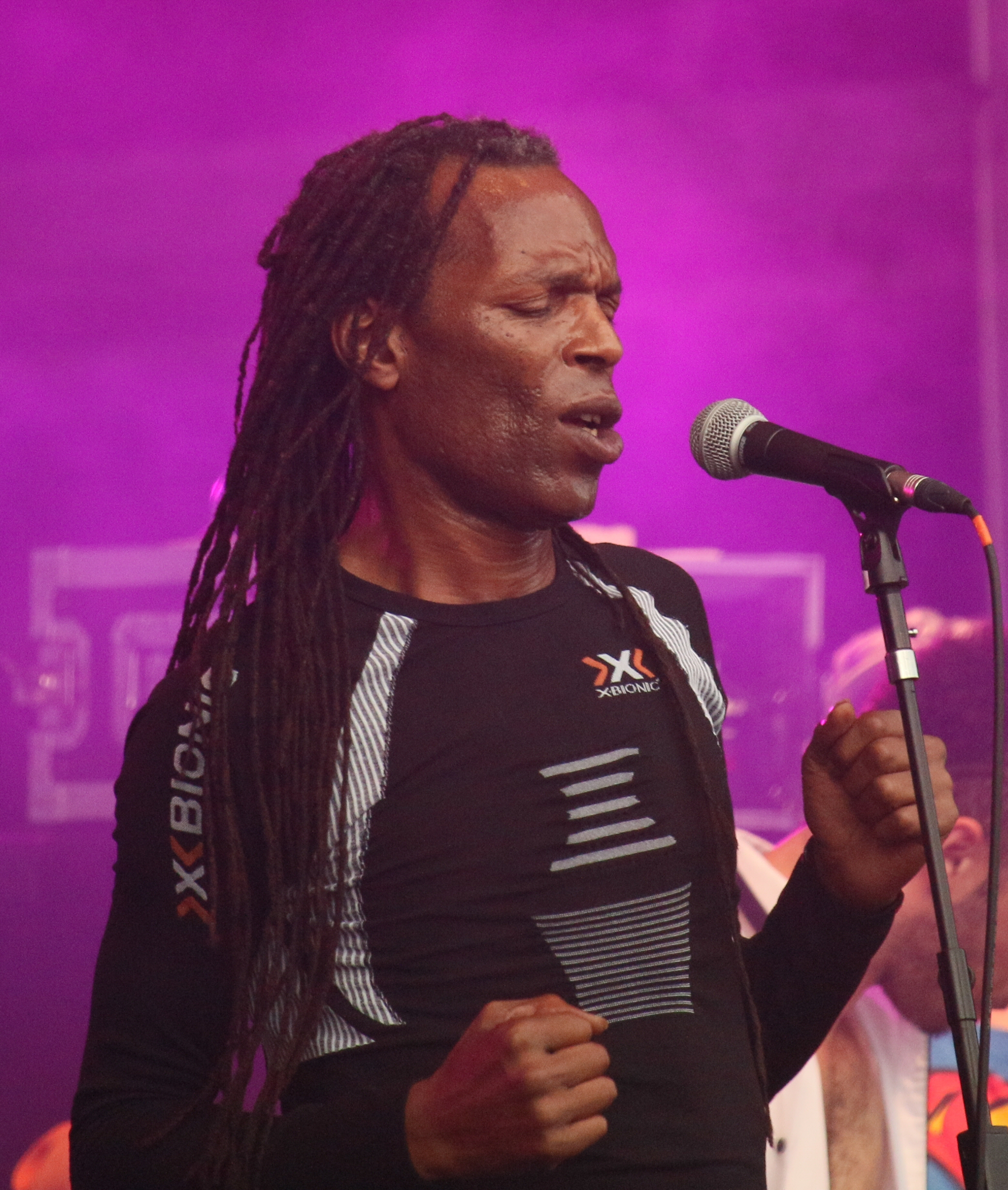
- Roger performing at the Godiva Festival in Coventry, 2015

Background information
- Born: Roger Charlery; 22 February 1963; Birmingham, England
- Died: 26 March 2019 (aged 56) Birmingham, England
- Genres: New wave; ska; two-tone; post-punk
- Occupation: Musician
- Instruments: Vocals
- Years active: 1978–2019
- Labels: IRS; Paras

Roger Charlery (22 February 1963 – 26 March 2019), known professionally as Ranking Roger, was an English musician. He was a vocalist in the 1980s ska band the Beat (known in North America as the English Beat) and later new wave band General Public. He subsequently was the frontman for a reformed Beat lineup.

The "Ranking" moniker is short for "top-ranking" or "high-ranking", and was a titular boast common amongst reggae music MCs.

== Early life ==
Roger Charlery was born in Birmingham and grew up in the Small Heath area of the city. The son of Jean Baptiste Charlery and his wife Anne Marie, he was of West Indian descent; his mother and father were from Saint Lucia. He attended Archbishop Williams school, and while still at school began deejaying with reggae sound systems before becoming a drummer with the Dum Dum Boys in 1978.

== 1970s–2001 ==
Roger became a punk rock fan as a teenager and was the drummer in the Dum Dum Boys before joining ska revival pioneers the Beat in the late 1970s. The Dum Dum Boys' first gig was with the Beat and his burgeoning friendship with them meant he began to gatecrash their gigs, take the mic, and start toasting. He had appeared on stage, toasting and singing with them, many times before officially joining the band. His energetic style and Jamaican-influenced vocals, paired with Dave Wakeling, were crucial in distinguishing the band from the other second-wave ska bands. The Beat released three albums: the critically acclaimed and seminal I Just Can't Stop It (1980), Wha'ppen? (1981) and Special Beat Service (1982).

Music journalist Richard Grabel wrote in 1985: "In the Beat, his role was mainly to 'toast' — Jamaican slang for the rhythmic raps that Roger would interject into the middle of the Beat's songs. But those toasts often contained the songs' most important emotional messages. Beyond that, Roger was the one whose looseness and humor, great dancing and general presence made the Beat happen on stage."

In 1981, Joe Strummer and Mick Jones of the Clash invited him to sing on a version of "Rock the Casbah" which was later released in 2015.

After the Beat's 1983 break-up, Roger and Wakeling formed General Public with former members of Dexys Midnight Runners and Horace Panter of the Specials. Roger took more of a leading role with vocals in this group. They released the album All the Rage (1984), aided by the single "Tenderness". Three years later, they released Hand to Mouth (1986), which was less successful, and the band broke up.

In 1995, Roger and Wakeling reformed General Public with a new supporting band, and released the album Rub It Better. The duo also worked on various projects and reunited for the 1994 Threesome soundtrack, recording a cover of "I'll Take You There".

Roger released Radical Departure, his first solo album, in 1988 which included band members Panter and Fuzz Townshend. The single "So Excited" peaked at No. 23 on the US Modern Rock Tracks chart. On 2001's Inside My Head, Roger pursued a more dance/electronic sound.

== Collaborations ==
In the early 1990s, Roger joined members of the Specials to form the new band Special Beat which released two live albums. In 1996, he sang back-up and toasting on the new version of the Police's "The Bed's Too Big Without You" on Sting's "Let Your Soul Be Your Pilot" CD-Maxi single. The American rock band Smash Mouth featured Roger on the song "You Are My Number One" from their album Get the Picture? (2003).

He collaborated with Pato Banton in 1995 on "Bubbling Hot", which peaked at No. 15 on the UK single charts.

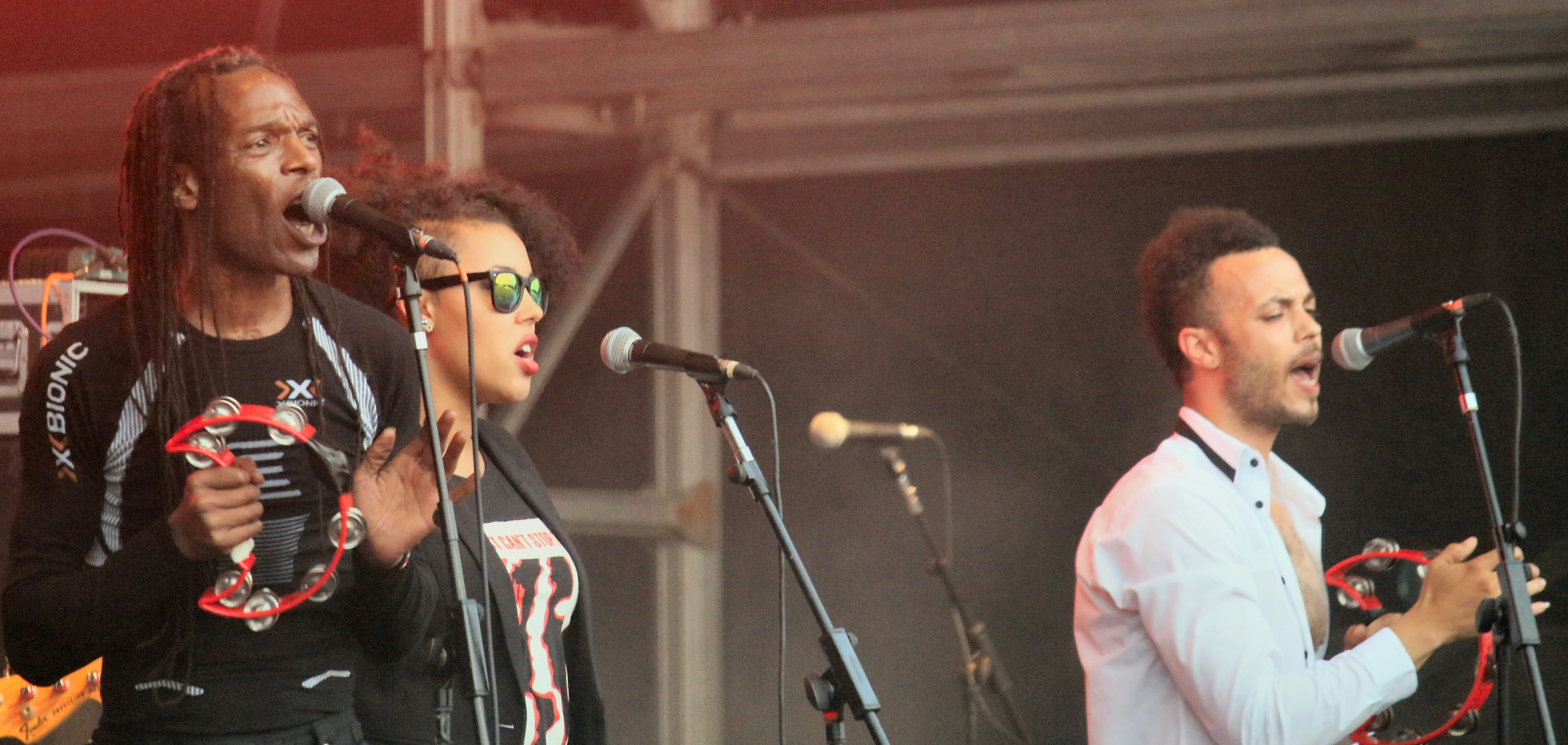
Ranking Roger, performing with his daughter Saffren Murphy and son Ranking Junior (Matthew Murphy) in 2015

In 2005, the Beat re-formed, with Roger and Everett Morton of the original line-up, with Roger's son, Ranking Junior also on vocals. Performing some new material, the Beat performed at Glastonbury the same year, where Roger was joined by Ranking Junior.

Roger sang on "Roxanne" onstage with the Police on their 2007 reunion tour. He was a guest performer on Big Audio Dynamite's seventh album Higher Power in 1994 when the band were known as simply 'Big Audio'. He later became a member of Big Audio Dynamite for their final studio album Entering a New Ride (1997).

Roger contributed to Walls Come Tumbling Down: The Music and Politics of Rock Against Racism, 2 Tone and Red Wedge, written by Daniel Rachel and published in 2016.

Roger collaborated with Welsh ragga-metal band Dub War on a cover of the Upsetters' "War Ina Babylon" in what is claimed to be his last recording before his death, which will be included on their 2022 album Westgate Under Fire.

== Later work ==
Roger continued to lead the Beat and tours throughout Europe as well as works on solo projects. In his last years he released a series of new albums. 2013 saw the release of Retrospective, an album of solo work recorded over the 25 years since the break-up of General Public, featuring various artists and producers including Sly and Robbie, and songs such as "Bubbling Hot" (the 1994 hit collaboration with Pato Banton) and a cover of "The Bed's Too Big Without You" (first recorded with Sting for the 1996 film The Truth About Cats & Dogs).

Live in London was released in 2013 – a live recording of the Beat playing at 229 The Venue, featuring some of their greatest hits as well as new tracks by Roger and Ranking Junior.

2014's Pop Off the Head Top consisted of entirely new compositions, including additional vocals and song writing from Ranking Junior. They recorded tracks for this project with Hugh Harris from London, Dopegrinders from Brighton and Mr. Anonymous from Colorado. Other key tracks involved the Italian producer AleXannA whose version of "Sixteen Tons" features vocals by Roger, Ranking Junior, and Roger's daughter Saffren Murphy.

Rock the Casbah, released in 2015 in collaboration with the charity Strummerville (founded by the friends and family of Joe Strummer to support aspiring musicians and projects that create social mobility through music) is a five-track EP which features a previously unheard version of "Rock the Casbah", which Joe Strummer and Mick Jones of the Clash had asked Roger to sing on back in 1981, re-recorded by the Brighton producers Dopegrinders, and using the original stems donated by Mick Jones. The EP features new tracks by Roger, Ranking Junior and Hugh Harris as well as a re-working of "Muscle Ska", co-written by Roger and Neville Staple from the Specials.

In September 2016, DMF released Bounce; the first new album by the Beat in 30 years. Written by Ranking Roger, Mick Lister and Ranking Junior, it was produced by Mick Lister and mixed by Tim Hamill and Mick Lister, with the exception of "Side to Side" and "My Dream", which were mixed by Dennis Bovell. The album was recorded in Roger's 'eco-friendly hideaway' – a round recording studio in his back garden, which he called The Pod. The album received generally positive reviews with reviewers typically praising the band's 'passionately political edge' and pointing to how the album 'encompasses every aspect of one of the most musically diverse bands to come out of the multi-racial, multi-cultural explosion that made British pop music what it was in the 80's'.

The band continues to tour, as of 2020, and currently features Roger's son Ranking Junior (real name Matthew Murphy), with drummers Oscar Harrison of Ocean Colour Scene and Fuzz Townshend of Pop Will Eat Itself. The line-up is completed by Chiko Hamilton on sax, bass guitarist Andy Pearson, former Bad Manners and Specialbeat guitarist Andy Perriss and Bobby Bird of Higher Intelligence Agency.

In 2017, the Beat joined fellow 2 Tone band the Selecter for a co-headline UK tour, Owing to demand, the tour was extended to cover other countries.

In early August 2018, Ranking Roger was hospitalised with a suspected mini-stroke. He recuperated at home, but cancelled planned live shows in the United Kingdom and United States. The band had just finished recording an album and Roger had written his autobiography, I Just Can't Stop It, published June 2019.

== Personal life and death ==
Roger had five children, including son Ranking Junior (Matthew Murphy) and daughter Saffren who both featured with their father in a Beat revival band.

In January 2019, it was announced that Roger had undergone surgery for two brain tumours, and was undergoing treatment for lung cancer. He died at his home in Birmingham on 26 March 2019 at the age of 56.

In 2021, Ranking Junior and indie rock band the Ordinary Boys recorded a tribute single to his father called "Legacy".

== Discography ==
Solo

- Radical Departure (1988)
- Inside My Head (2001)

The Beat feat. Ranking Roger

- Bounce (2016)
- Public Confidential (2019)
