= Pete Saunders =

English keyboard player

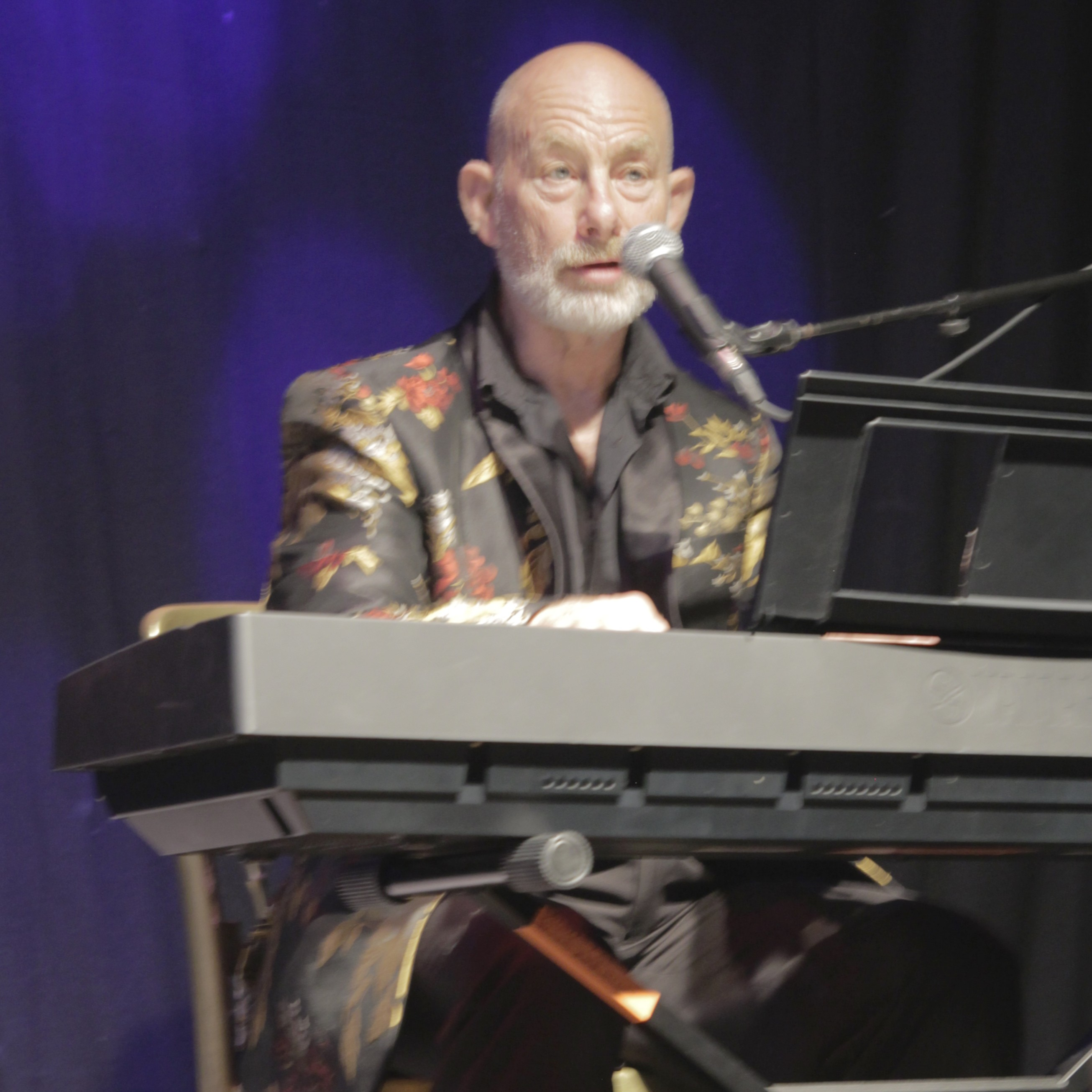

Background information
- Born: Peter Saunders; 1960 (age 65–66)
- Origin: England
- Genres: Rock, pop, new wave, jazz
- Instrument: Keyboards

Peter Saunders (born 1960) is an English keyboard player.

== Early life ==
Saunders was born in Hammersmith in West London. When he was 14, his family moved to Birmingham. At the age of 16, he joined Pub Theatre and wrote songs and performed with them.

== Dexy's Midnight Runners ==
In 1978, Saunders joined Dexys Midnight Runners in response to an advertisement in his local newspaper. After briefly separating from the band in 1979, he returned in 1980 for the writing and recording of Searching for the Young Soul Rebels, which peaked in the UK charts at number 6. After leaving the band for a protracted period of time, Saunders returned to Dexys in 2003 to perform on the tracks "Manhood" and "My Life in England Part One".

== Various bands ==
In 1979, Saunders moved to London, where he drove a van for a living while playing keyboards where and when he could. During this period, he played for The Damned. He also joined The Decorators, playing on their first album Tablets. They shared a record label with the band Carmel. Inspired by the single "Bad Day", Saunders auditioned in Manchester and joined Carmel on their first album, writing the tune for the song "More More More". At the same time as playing with Carmel, he was also playing keyboards for Serious Drinking, which he describes on his website as "some of the most fun I've ever had in music." He played on their first album, The Revolution Starts at Closing Time, and the mini album They May Be Drinkers Robin But They Are Also Human Beings. With the Drinkers, he toured the Netherlands and Germany in 1984, where the band were played on the John Peel show. Between 1985 and 1987, he played keyboards in Jake Burns and the Big Wheel.

There was then a period of time without music where Saunders had a variety of jobs including decorating. In 1992, he joined the Jive Aces touring France, Germany and Switzerland with the band. Thereafter, he started playing some dinner jazz in hotels and bars and gigs with The Fallen Heroes. In 1999, he formed his own band, The New Originals.

In 2005, he started working at a London burlesque/cabaret venue in Holborn, playing the piano before shows and introducing acts. This led to him putting shows together such as Blues and Burlesque. Blues and Burlesque became an independent performing group with Leah Shand a.k.a. Vicious Delicious, and Chloe Hunter a.k.a. Bouncy Hunter, putting on weekly shows at Volupte with artists such as Dusty Limits, Kitty Bang Bang, Chrys Colombine and Polly Rae, and then in other venues. In June 2012, Saunders left Volupte. In August that year, the group put on a show at the Counting House in the Edinburgh fringe festival with regular sell out shows. This was repeated in 2013 in the Blind Poet with Emma Williamson a.k.a. Scarlett Belle taking over from Chloe Hunter.

In 2014, he took the Blues and Burlesque group to the Perth and Adelaide Fringe festivals where they had two sell out runs, and in 2023 another sold-out run at the Edinburgh Fringe Festival.

== Personal life ==
In 2003, Saunders married Shelley Graham and later that year moved in with her in Islington.
