= Mickey Billingham =

English keyboardist

- Genres: Rock; ska; new wave
- Occupations: Musician; composer
- Instruments: Keyboards; organ
- Years active: 1980–present
- Formerly of: Dexys Midnight Runners; General Public; The Beat

Mickey Billingham (also credited Micky Billingham) is an English keyboardist. He was the former keyboardist of the pop rock band Dexys Midnight Runners. After the band broke up, he and another member, Andy "Stoker" Growcott, became co-founding members of new wave band General Public, contributing to the band's debut studio album All the Rage (1984).

Billingham went on to play in the Beat with Ranking Roger and Everett Morton, who have both since died.

As well as being in the Beat, Billingham also teaches singing and performance techniques at Dudley College in the West Midlands.
