= The Killjoys (British band) =

British punk band

- Origin: Birmingham, England
- Genres: Punk rock
- Years active: 1976–1978
- Label: Raw Records
- Past members: Kevin Rowland; Ghislaine "Gil" Weston; Mark Philips; Heather Tonge; Lee Burton; Bob Peach; Keith Rimell; Kevin Archer

The Killjoys were a punk band from Birmingham, England, formed in 1976, with members including Kevin Rowland and Kevin "Al" Archer, who would later form Dexys Midnight Runners, and Ghislaine "Gil" Weston, who would later join Girlschool. Although their releases while still together were limited to one single, subsequent interest has seen an album of their recordings released.

== History ==
Kevin Rowland (vocals, a trained hairdresser), Ghislaine "Gil" Weston (a.k.a. "Gem", bass guitar), and Mark Philips (guitar) had been members of the mid-1970s Roxy Music-inspired band Lucy & the Lovers. With the advent of punk rock, Rowland wrote new songs and started The Killjoys, adding Heather Tonge (backing vocals) and Joe 45 (Lee Burton, drums). The band relocated to London and took up lodgings in a disused branch of Barclays Bank. The band came to the attention of Raw Records boss Lee Wood, who signed the band for the single "Johnny Won't Get to Heaven"/"Naïve", which went on to sell 18,000 copies. This was the largest-selling single that Raw Records ever had. At the time, the band contained two couples: Philips and Weston, and Rowland and Tonge. This line-up lasted for eighteen months, and several recording sessions took place for a debut album. The Killjoys recorded two sessions for John Peel's BBC Radio 1 show: the first in October 1977, the second in February 1978, by which time Keith Rimell (guitar) and Bob Peach (drums) had been recruited, replacing Philips and Burton; Rowland used his hairdressing talents to give the new members short haircuts. Tonge also left the group; according to Wood, the rumor was that Rowland had returned home early and found her in bed with someone else.

The band disintegrated when Rowland's enforced eight-hour practice sessions began to take their toll, especially because other members of the band had a vision of it that was different than Rowland's. The tension between Rowland and the rest of the band was clear; Rimell described the atmosphere as "us against him", and Gareth Holder of The Shapes noted "the level of hatred that the rest of the Killjoys appear to have for [Rowland]". Rimell left the band after an argument with Rowland, to be replaced by Kevin Archer, who Rowland insisted should be renamed "Al" Archer as he did not want another "Kevin" in the band. A story circulated that Rowland rejected a £20,000 contract with Bronze Records because it was only a singles deal, to the disdain of other band members; however, in 2004 Weston questioned the validity of the story, and in 2007 Rowland said the story was "nonsense".

Peach, Philips and Weston soon left to form Out of Nowhere (later called Alternating, and then Luxound Deluxe), with Weston later joining Girlschool on the recommendation of Lemmy. Rowland, disillusioned with punk rock, immersed himself in vintage soul music, particularly the records of Geno Washington, and (with Archer) formed a new band, Dexys Midnight Runners.

== Members ==
- Kevin Rowland - vocals (1976–1978)
- Ghislaine "Gil" Weston - bass (1976–1978)
- Mark Philips - guitar (1976–1978)
- Heather Tonge - backing vocals (1976–1978)
- Lee Burton - drums (1976–1978)
- Bob Peach - drums (1978)
- Keith Rimell - guitar (1978)
- Kevin Archer - guitar (1978)

== Discography ==
=== Albums ===
- Naïve (1992), Damaged Goods

=== Singles ===
- "Johnny Won't Get to Heaven"/"Naïve" (1977), Raw (reissued 1978, and again later by Damaged Goods)
- Studio Demos 18 October 1977 7-inch EP (2002), Last Year's Youth

=== Compilation appearances ===
- "At Night" on Raw Deal (1977), Raw
