= Scooby-Doo! and the Samurai Sword =

- DVD cover
- Directed by: Christopher Berkeley
- Written by: Joe Sichta
- Based on: Scooby-Doo by Joe Ruby and Ken Spears
- Produced by: Joe Sichta
- Starring: Frank Welker; Casey Kasem; Mindy Cohn; Grey DeLisle; Kelly Hu; Kevin Michael Richardson; Sab Shimono; George Takei; Gedde Watanabe; Keone Young; Brian Cox
- Edited by: Rob Desales
- Music by: Thomas Chase Jones
- Production companies: Warner Premiere; Warner Bros. Animation
- Distributed by: Warner Home Video
- Release date: April 7, 2009
- Running time: 74 minutes
- Country: United States
- Language: English

Scooby-Doo! and the Samurai Sword is a 2009 American animated comedy mystery martial arts film, as well as the thirteenth entry in a series of direct-to-video animated films based on the Scooby-Doo franchise. In the United States, the DVD sold over 163,890 units in its first week and as of January 2014, it has sold approximately over 524,725 units.

This is the last direct-to-video Scooby-Doo film to use the brighter lighting and art visual style keen to the What's New, Scooby-Doo? TV series, making it the last What's New, Scooby-Doo? related production. It was also the last Scooby-Doo production to feature Casey Kasem as the voice of Shaggy before his retirement as the character in 2010 and death in 2014.

== Plot ==
In flashbacks, an ancient warrior asked swordsmith Masamune to craft a sword of great mystical power. Masamune agreed, but stated that the process will take a year. Masamune's apprentice Muramasa subsequently offered to make a similarly powerful sword in half the time. The warrior accepted. However, Muramasa's evil nature was imbued into his creation, the Sword of Doom, and turned the warrior into the Black Samurai. When Masamune finished his creation, the Sword of Fate, he presented it to the Green Dragon, who battled the Black Samurai and imprisoned him in the Sword of Doom before hiding it and marking its whereabouts within a riddle written on the Destiny Scroll.

In the present, Mr. Takagawa, the curator of a museum of ancient history in Tokyo, and Kenji, a janitor, witness an exhibit of the Black Samurai seemingly come to life. The next day, the Mystery Inc. gang travel to the prestigious Mirimoto Academy near Tokyo for a martial arts tournament that Daphne Blake was invited to participate in. Upon their arrival, the gang meet Daphne's friend Miyumi, the academy's head Miss Mirimoto and her bodyguard Sojo, and Takagawa, who warns Mirimoto of the Black Samurai's quest to steal the Destiny Scroll. Though the warrior leads an army of ninjas in attacking the academy and seemingly steal the scroll, Mirimoto reveals he stole a copy and presents the real one to the gang.

After Shaggy Rogers and his dog Scooby-Doo unknowingly solve the riddle, Mirimoto sends the gang to find the Sword of Doom before the Black Samurai. They eventually reach an uncharted island in the Pacific Ocean, where they fight off island natives and the Black Samurai's forces. Amidst this, the gang unmask the Black Samurai as Sojo before retrieving the Sword of Doom and returning to Mirimoto, who reveals she staged the tournament to bring Mystery Inc. to Japan to help her find the Sword of Doom so she can resurrect the Black Samurai and take over the world and program the ninjas, which are revealed to be robots, with the fighting styles of her tournament's competitors. Miyumi betrays the gang to side with Mirimoto, who subsequently captures most of Mystery Inc. and Takagawa, but Daphne passes the Sword of Doom to Shaggy and Scooby, who escape on a jetpack. Though they are pursued by the robots, who steal the Sword of Doom, the pair are rescued by Matsuhiro, a sushi shop owner and samurai who agrees to train them in his ways.

Once their training is complete, he sends them to the Green Dragon to gain his help in stopping the Black Samurai once more. Meanwhile, Kenji unknowingly frees Mystery Inc. and Takagawa, who build an EMP device to stop the robots. A repentant Miyumi attempts to take the Sword of Doom, but Mirimoto retrieves it so Sojo can free the Black Samurai from it. Mirimoto attempts to control him, but the Black Samurai defeats her and Sojo before subduing the others. Soon enough, Shaggy, Scooby, and the Green Dragon arrive to fight back with the Sword of Fate. With Matsuhiro's aid and the Green Dragon's power, Scooby uses the Sword of Fate to destroy the Sword of Doom, breaking the Black Samurai's curse and rendering him mortal again. The samurai thanks Mystery Inc. for freeing him before dying.

Afterward, Mystery Inc. attends the newly renovated museum, where a statue of Scooby was erected in honor of him saving Japan. They invite Miyumi to join them on their travels, but she declines in favor of focusing on herself.

== Voice cast ==
- Casey Kasem as Shaggy Rogers
- Frank Welker as Scooby-Doo, Fred Jones, Kerry Kilpatrick and Mad Dog Masimoto
- Mindy Cohn as Velma Dinkley
- Grey DeLisle as Daphne Blake and Sapphire Sonja
- Kelly Hu as Miyumi and Miss Mirimoto
- Sab Shimono as Mr. Takagawa
- Keone Young as Matsuhiro
- Kevin Michael Richardson as Sojo and The Black Samurai
- Gedde Watanabe as Kenji
- George Takei as the mortal Black Samurai
- Brian Cox as The Green Dragon
