= One Day I'm Going to Soar =

Studio album by Dexys
- Released: 4 June 2012
- Length: 56:47
- Label: BMG
- Producer: Kevin Rowland, Mick Talbot, Pete Schwier

Dexys chronology
Don't Stand Me Down (1985)	One Day I'm Going to Soar (2012)	Let the Record Show: Dexys Do Irish and Country Soul (2016)

Singles from One Day I'm Going to Soar
- 1. "She Got a Wiggle" Released: 28 May 2012

Professional ratings
Aggregate scores
Source	Rating
AnyDecentMusic?	7.9/10
Metacritic	82/100
Review scores
Source	Rating
AllMusic	3.5/5 stars
The Daily Telegraph	4/5 stars
The Guardian	4/5 stars
The Independent	4/5 stars
Mojo	5/5 stars
NME	7/10
The Observer	3/5 stars
Pitchfork	6.7/10
Q	4/5 stars
Uncut	9/10

One Day I'm Going to Soar is a 2012 album by Dexys, the band formerly known as Dexys Midnight Runners. It was the band's fourth studio album, but its first in 27 years. The album features, alongside Dexys' lead singer (and leader) Kevin Rowland, 1980s Dexys members Big "Jim" Paterson, Pete Williams and Mick Talbot, new recruits Neil Hubbard, Tim Cansfield and Lucy Morgan, and guest vocalist Madeleine Hyland, who duets with Rowland on several songs.

== Pre-release teasers ==
The first two minutes of the first track of the album were uploaded to YouTube on 8 February 2012. The track "Nowhere Is Home" was played on the radio for the first time on Radcliffe and Maconie's 6music show on 9 March 2012, as well as being made available for free download via the band's SoundCloud page. Speaking on the 6music show, Kevin Rowland explained the 27-year gap between albums "I wanted to have material that I felt confident enough about ... I’ve got high standards, and that’s a blessing and a curse. The perfectionism hasn’t gone, although these days I won’t storm out of a room swearing and shouting at people."

Dexys' live shows surrounding the album's release consisted of the album in its entirety, followed by a selection of the band's older material.

A single, "She Got a Wiggle", preceded the album, being released on 28 May 2012.

On Dexys' official YouTube account, they have released 2 videos for "She Got a Wiggle" and "Incapable of Love".

== Track listing ==
No.	Title	Writer(s)	Length
1.	"Now"	Kevin Rowland; Big “Jim” Paterson; Mick Talbot	6:47
2.	"Lost"	Rowland; Alex James; Pete Williams	3:00
3.	"Me"	Rowland; Simon Dine; Talbot	4:17
4.	"She Got a Wiggle"	Rowland; Paterson; Talbot	4:27
5.	"You"	Rowland; Talbot	3:32
6.	"I'm Thinking of You"	Rowland; Paterson; Talbot	7:02
7.	"I'm Always Going to Love You"	Rowland; Talbot	5:37
8.	"Incapable of Love"	Rowland; Paterson; Talbot	5:30
9.	"Nowhere Is Home"	Rowland; Glen Matlock; Talbot	4:57
10.	"Free"	Rowland; Natasha E. McCluney; Talbot	3:44
11.	"It's O.K. John Joe"	Rowland; Ben Brieley; Talbot	7:54

== Personnel ==
- Kevin Rowland – vocals (all tracks)
- Mick Talbot – keyboard, piano, organ (all tracks)
- Pete Williams – bass (all tracks), vocals (tracks 2, 10)
- Big “Jim” Paterson – trombone (track 11)
- Neil Hubbard – guitar (tracks 1, 2, 4–6)
- Tim Cansfield – guitar (tracks 3, 7–11)
- Madeleine Hyland – vocals (tracks 7–8)
- Ralph Salmins – drums (tracks 1, 6)
- Troy Miller – drums (tracks 2, 3, 5, 9–11)
- Ash Soame – drums (track 4)
- Geoff Dunn – drums (tracks 7–8)
- Lucy Morgan – viola (tracks 1, 2, 4–11), booking of strings, brass and harp players
- Ben Trigg – cello (tracks 1, 2, 5–11), arrangement of strings, brass and harp
- Chris Worsey – cello (track 4)
- Alice Pratley – violin 1 (tracks 1, 4, 6–8, 9–11)
- Mardyah Tucker – violin 2 (track 1, 6)
- Matthew Elston – violin 1 (tracks 2, 5)
- Cat Parker – violin 2 (tracks 2, 5, 9, 11)
- Oli Langford – violin 2 (track 4)
- Sali-Wyn Ryan – violin 2 (tracks 7, 8, 10)
- Karlos Edwards – percussion (tracks 1, 4, 6)
- Jody Linscott – percussion (tracks 3, 7, 8, 10)
- Kim Chandler – backing vocals (1, 11)
- Vic Bynoe – backing vocals (1, 11), vocals (6)
- Suzie Furlonger – vocals (4)
- Mark Brown – saxophone (1, 6–8)
- Camilla Pay – harp (2)
- Quentin Collins – trumpet (1)
- Dave Hopkin – trumpet (7, 8)
- Gavin Broom – trumpet (10)
