= Pete Williams (musician) =

English singer-songwriter

- Born: 1960 (age 65–66)
- Origin: The Midlands, England
- Occupation: Singer-songwriter
- Instruments: bass guitar, ukulele, keyboards
- Years active: 1978–present
- Formerly of: Dexys Midnight Runners; The Bureau
- Website: www.petewilliamsmusic.com

Pete Williams (born 1960) is an English singer/songwriter and musician, known for his work with Dexys Midnight Runners, The Bureau and These Tender Virtues. He is an original member of Dexys Midnight Runners and played on the number one single "Geno".

Williams played on the 2012 album One Day I'm Going to Soar by Dexys and sang with frontman Kevin Rowland on the Jools' Annual Hootenanny TV show on 31 December 2012. He also sang with them on The Acoustic Stage at Glastonbury Festival 2014.

He was a special guest for The Proclaimers on their tour in 2019 and The Specials on their UK tour in 2021.

After playing during the building of the new Jennifer Blackwell Performance Space at Symphony Hall, Birmingham in June 2020, Williams performed there with his full band in January 2022, four months after it was opened by Prince Edward, Earl of Wessex.

Poetic Justice magazine has noted that critics have compared his music to Dexys, but Williams "was, and is, his own person with a distinct vision and voice".

== Discography ==
=== Albums ===
- See (Basehart Recordings, 2012)
- Roughnecks + Roustabouts (Basehart Recordings, 2015)
- The Pete Williams Band Live At Yellow Arch Sheffield 20/3/15 (Pledge Music, 2015)
- H.O.L.L.A.N.D (Basehart Recordings, 2018)
