= Horace Panter =

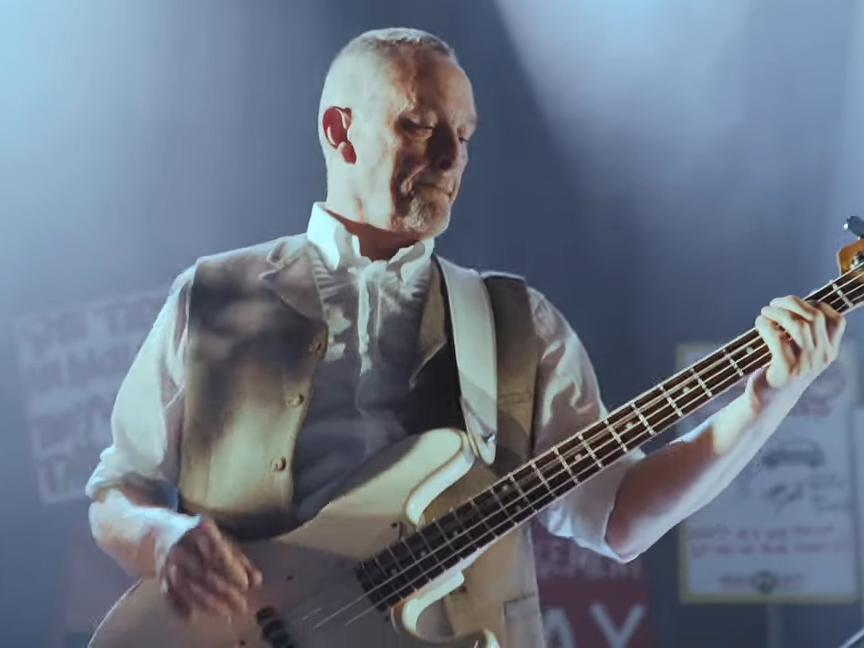
- Panter in 2019

Background information
- Also known as: Sir Horace Gentleman
- Born: Stephen Graham Panter; 30 August 1953 (age 73)
- Origin: Croydon, Surrey, England
- Genres: New wave, ska, rock
- Occupations: Musician; artist; teacher
- Website: http://www.horacepanterart.com/

Stephen Graham "Horace" Panter (born 30 August 1953), also known professionally as Sir Horace Gentleman, is the bassist for the British 2 Tone ska band The Specials.

== Early life ==
Panter was born in Croydon, Surrey and spent most of his formative years in Kettering, Northamptonshire starting a one-year art course at Northampton College in 1971. In 1972, he began studying fine art at Coventry's Lanchester Polytechnic (now Coventry University).

== Music ==
In his second year at Lanchester Polytechnic he met Jerry Dammers and together they formed The Specials. The band started playing in Coventry bars and clubs before releasing their first single, 'Gangsters' on their own record label (2-Tone). Following the break-up of The Specials in 1981, Panter went on to play with General Public with Dave Wakeling and Ranking Roger from the original Beat, and then with the reformed Specials in the 1990s. Panter then joined forces with Neol Davies of The Selecter to form a Blues band, Box of Blues. Today, he is a full-time member of the reformed Specials and is also in a blues combo, called 'Blues 2 Go'. He has also played with Malik & Pettite (formerly The Tones), and is in the process of getting together a ska orchestra called 'The Uptown Ska Collective' who began touring in 2014.

Panter has been playing with The Dirt Road Band since 2022, although an earlier incarnation of the band briefly appeared in 2017 and played the odd gig in the Midlands. The band have recently released their debut album, Righteous.

== Teaching, autobiography and art ==
During the 1990s, Panter qualified as a teacher and taught art to special needs children at Corley Special School in North Warwickshire from 1998 to 2008.

He has written an autobiography, Ska'd for Life, in which he described his involvement in the creation of the punk-ska hybrid that became known as '2-Tone, and described his experiences since the band's creation.

An occupation of Panter's alongside his performing with the Specials is art. He has been a professional artist since 2010 and has exhibited throughout the UK. His work is based on traditional forms of iconography fused with the sensibilities of British pop art.
