= Kevin Archer =

- Also known as: Al Archer
- Born: 21 December 1958 (age 67); Birmingham, England
- Years active: 1970s–1980s
- Formerly of: The Killjoys, Dexys Midnight Runners, The Blue Ox Babes

Kevin Archer (born 21 December 1958) is an English guitarist and songwriter.

== Career ==
Archer played with Kevin Rowland in the punk rock group the Killjoys. In 1978, Rowland and Archer formed Dexys Midnight Runners. Archer co-wrote some of the songs on the group's debut album Searching for the Young Soul Rebels.

He used the name "Al" because Kevin Rowland decided that the group was not big enough to accommodate two Kevins. After the first album, Archer, exhausted by Dexys' touring schedule, left the group in early 1981. In a 2009 interview, with Joanne Malin on her BBC Radio WM morning show, Archer said he enjoyed the musical side of the group, but did not enjoy the culture of the band under Rowland's direction. The band's second album, Too-Rye-Ay (1982), featured his significant influence on the hit single "Come On Eileen", though Rowland did not acknowledge this until years later.

He then formed the Blue Ox Babes. The band finally signed to Go! Discs Records for three singles and an aborted album, Apples & Oranges, which belatedly saw release in 2009 – 20 years after it was recorded.
