= Andy "Stoker" Growcott =

English drummer

- Also known as: Stoker
- Born: Andrew Growcott; Wolverhampton, England
- Genres: Pop; soul; Celtic folk; rock; new wave; hip hop
- Occupations: Musician; audio engineer
- Instrument: Drums
- Years active: 1980–present
- Label: Knitting Factory
- Formerly of: Dexys Midnight Runners; The Bureau; General Public

Andrew Growcott (a.k.a. Stoker) is a former member of the pop rock band Dexys Midnight Runners. After the Dexys broke up, he and another bandmate, Mickey Billingham, joined new wave band General Public. Growcott also played with Stephen Tin Tin Duffy in the early 1980s. He has since transitioned into a career as an audio engineer, working on albums such as Ice Cube's Death Certificate (1991).

In 1997, he released a studio album under his stage name, Stoker, called Syncopate on Knitting Factory's Knit Classics label that contained modern covers of jazz compositions by Duke Ellington, Thelonious Monk, Lee Morgan, Sonny Rollins, Miles Davis, Yusef Lateef, Duke Pearson, Reuben Wilson, et al. The album featured several instrumentalists including David Longoria on trumpet, Greg Smith, Marc Antoine and others.
